= 2025 Danish local elections =

- 18 November 2025
- All 2,432 seats in the municipal councils, and 134 seats in the regional councils
Party	Leader	Vote %	Seats	+/–
Municipal councils
Social Democrats	Mette Frederiksen	23.2	599	−156
Venstre	Troels Lund Poulsen	17.9	521	−99
Conservatives	Mona Juul	12.7	342	−62
Green Left	Pia Olsen Dyhr	11.1	248	+80
DPP	Morten Messerschmidt	5.9	152	+61
Liberal Alliance	Alex Vanopslagh	5.5	125	+116
Denmark Democrats	Inger Støjberg	4.7	123	New
Red–Green	Pelle Dragsted	7.1	111	−3
Social Liberals	Martin Lidegaard	5.4	98	+4
Schleswig Party	Rainer Naujeck	0.3	12	+2
The Alternative	Franciska Rosenkilde	1.1	7	+2
Moderates	Lars Løkke Rasmussen	1.3	6	New
Other		4.3	88	−79
Regional councils
Social Democrats	Mette Frederiksen	22.1	36	−28
Venstre	Troels Lund Poulsen	17.1	28	−26
Conservatives	Mona Juul	10.8	19	−12
Green Left	Pia Olsen Dyhr	10.8	15	+1
DPP	Morten Messerschmidt	9.0	11	+5
Red–Green	Pelle Dragsted (Note: Formally, the Red–Green Alliance has collective leadership.)	7.3	8	−6
Social Liberals	Martin Lidegaard	6.5	8	−4
Liberal Alliance	Alex Vanopslagh	5.9	8	+8
Denmark Democrats	Inger Støjberg	5.4	7	New
Moderates	Lars Løkke Rasmussen	1.8	1	New
The Alternative	Franciska Rosenkilde	1.3	0	0
Other			1	0
This lists parties that won seats. See the complete results below.

Local elections were held in Denmark on 18 November 2025 for the 2026–2029 term of office. All 2,432 local and 134 regional councillors in Denmark's 98 municipalities and four regions were up for election. The 47 member council of the Region of Eastern Denmark, a merger of the Capital Region and Region Zealand, was elected for the first time. The new region is scheduled to be established 1 January 2027. The unincorporated small archipelago of Ertholmene is to remain under central government administration and not be a part of a region or municipality.

== Background ==
Every four years, on the third Tuesday in November, local elections are held in Denmark. All 98 municipalities and 4 regions hold elections simultaneously on this date. Rebild Municipality, Lemvig Municipality and Vordingborg Municipality are reducing their number of councillors from 25 to 23, 21 to 19 and 29 to 27 respectively, while Frederiksberg Municipality, is increasing its number from 29 to 31.

== Electoral system ==
In Danish local elections, all 98 municipal councils and four regional councils are elected concurrently. The municipal councils have between 9 and 31 members, except the Copenhagen City Council which has 55 members. Two of the regional councils have 31 members each, North Jutland 25, and one, the Region of Eastern Denmark, has 47, the last of which was elected for the first time in the 2025 local elections. In total, 2,432 members are elected to the municipal councils, and 134 members are elected to the four regional councils in 2025.

All elections use the D'Hondt method to calculate number of seats, with the entire municipality or region being one single constituency. There is no legal electoral threshold. The parties are allowed to enter into electoral alliances. If parties agree to enter an electoral alliance, they would count their votes as one and seats would be distributed to electoral alliances and parties outside of electoral alliances using the D'Hondt method. When an electoral alliance has been allocated the number of seats it is entitled to, the seats would similarly be divided between the component parties using the D'Hondt method. To be an eligible voter, one must meet the following requirements:

- Being at least 18 years old
- Having permanent residence in a municipality
- At least one of the following:
  - Having Danish citizenship
  - Citizenship in another EU member state
  - Citizenship in Iceland or Norway
  - Citizenship in the United Kingdom
  - Had permanent residence in the Danish Realm for the last 4 years, prior to the election date

=== Municipal councils ===
Share of votes earned by the largest party in each polling area for the municipal election

==== Number of councillors and political parties in the municipal councils ====
Sum of 98 local elections
Party		Seats		Councils		Share of vote	
Party		Seats	+ / -	Councils	+ / -	Percent	+ / -
A	Social Democrats	599	▼156	96 / 98	▼2	23.2%	▼5.2%
V	Venstre	521	▼99	92 / 98	▼3	17.9%	▼3.3%
C	Conservatives	343	▼61	92 / 98	▼5	12.7%	▼2.5%
F	Green Left	248	▲80	96 / 98	▲7	11.1%	▲3.4%
O	Danish People's Party	153	▲63	82 / 95	▲11	5.9%	▲1.8%
I	Liberal Alliance	125	▲116	76 / 90	▲71	5.5%	▲4.1%
Æ	Denmark Democrats	123	▲123	60 / 82	▲60	4.7%	New
Ø	Red–Green Alliance	111	▼3	66 / 82	▼2	7.1%	▼0.3%
B	Social Liberals	97	▲3	58 / 85	▼1	5.4%	▼0.2%
S	Schleswig Party	12	▲2	4 / 4	0	0.3%	▼0.0%
Å	The Alternative	7	▲2	6 / 41	▲2	1.0%	▲0.3%
M	Moderates	6	▲6	6 / 71	▲6	1.3%	New
	Others	87	▼80	35 / 87	▼42	4.0%	▼4.1%

=== Regional councils ===
Share of votes earned by the largest party in each polling area for the regional election

==== Number of councillors and political parties in the four regional councils ====
Sum of 4 regional elections
Party		Seats		Councils		Share of vote	
Party		Seats	+ / -	Councils	+ / -	Percent	+ / -
A	Social Democrats	32	▼32	4 / 4	▼1	22.1%	▼5.9%
V	Venstre	28	▼26	4 / 4	▼1	17.1%	▼5.9%
C	Conservatives	15	▼16	4 / 4	▼1	10.8%	▼3.3%
F	Green Left	15	▲1	4 / 4	▼1	10.8%	▲3.5%
O	Danish People's Party	11	▲5	4 / 4	▼1	9.0%	▲4.9%
B	Social Liberals	8	▼4	4 / 4	▼1	6.5%	▲0.4%
I	Liberal Alliance	8	▲8	4 / 4	▲4	5.9%	▲4.4%
Ø	Red–Green Alliance	8	▼6	4 / 4	▼1	7.3%	▼0.4%
Æ	Denmark Democrats	7	▲7	4 / 4	▲4	5.4%	New
M	Moderates	1	▲1	1 / 4	▲1	1.8%	New
Å	The Alternative	0	0	0 / 4	0	1.3%	▲0.6%
	Others	1	▼9 (Note: The change in seats for "others" in regional councils is composed of: New Right went from 8 seats to none, Christian Democrats went from 1 seat to none, The Psychiatry List has unchanged 1 seat.)	1 / 4	▼4	2.0%	▼5.3%

==== Regional councils notional seats ====
Since their creation in 2007, Denmark's five regions have been a topic of continuous political debate. In June 2024, the government's Health Structure Commission put forward three proposals to reorganize the healthcare system, two of which involved dissolving the current regions. Ultimately, the regions were preserved, but with reforms affecting, among other things, the regional councils. From their first election in 2005 until the 2021 election, each of the five regional councils held 41 seats. The reform resulted in three regions, the North Denmark (25 council seats from 2026), Central Denmark (31 seats), and Southern Denmark Region (31 seats), maintaining their existing boundaries and continuing unchanged, while the other two regions, Zealand and Capital of Denmark were merged to create a new entity with the council having 47 seats. This is the results of the 2021 elections if the new number of councillors per region had been elected.

Party		Seats	
Party		Last election	Notional seats
A	Social Democrats	64	42
V	Venstre	54	36
C	Conservatives	31	20
F	Green Left	14	9
Ø	Red–Green Alliance	14	9
B	Social Liberals	12	7
O	Danish People's Party	6	5
I	Liberal Alliance	0	0
Å	The Alternative	0	0
M	Moderates	Did not exist	Did not exist
Æ	Denmark Democrats	Did not exist	Did not exist
	Others	10	6
Total		205	134

== Overview of regional councils ==
Social Democrats
Venstre

Chairmen outgoing and incoming
Region	Incumbent Chair	New Chair (Note: Please note that the mayors and regional council chairs were not elected during the local elections on November 18. Instead, they were elected at constituent meetings of each newly elected municipal and regional council that were held between December 1 and 15.)
North Denmark	Mads Duedahl	Mads Duedahl
Central Denmark	Anders Kühnau	Anders G. Christensen
Southern Denmark	Bo Libergren	Bo Libergren
Eastern Denmark	New Region	Lars Gaardhøj

== Overview of mayors ==
Social Democrats Venstre Conservatives
Green Left Liberal Alliance Schleswig Party
Social Liberals Danish People's Party
Other local parties

Mayors by party
Party		Mayors		Change
Party		Pre-election	Post-election	Change
V	Venstre	34	42	▲8
A	Social Democrats	44	26	▼18
C	Conservatives	14	20	▲6
F	Green Left	2	5	▲3
I	Liberal Alliance	1	2	▲1
B	Social Liberals	1	1	0
S	Schleswig Party	1	1	0
O	Danish People's Party	0	0	0
Æ	Denmark Democrats	Did not exist	0	0
Ø	Red–Green Alliance	0	0	0
Å	The Alternative	0	0	0
M	Moderates	Did not exist	0	0
	Others	1	1	0
Total		98		0

Mayors outgoing and incoming
Municipality	Incumbent mayor	New mayor
Aabenraa	Jan Riber Jakobsen	Jan Riber Jakobsen
Aalborg	Lasse Frimand Jensen	Lasse Frimand Jensen
Aarhus	Anders Winnerskjold	Anders Winnerskjold
Albertslund	Steen Christiansen	Lars Gravgaard Hansen
Allerød	Karsten Längerich	Clara Rao
Assens	Søren Steen Andersen	Søren Steen Andersen
Ballerup	Jesper Würtzen	Jesper Würtzen
Billund	Stephanie Storbank	Stephanie Storbank
Bornholm	Jacob Trøst	Frederik Tolstrup
Brøndby	Maja Højgaard	Maja Højgaard
Brønderslev	Mikael Klitgaard	Mikael Klitgaard
Dragør	Kenneth Gøtterup	Kenneth Gøtterup
Egedal	Vicky Holst Rasmussen	Birgitte Neergaard-Kofod
Esbjerg	Jesper Frost Rasmusssen	Jesper Frost Rasmusssen
Fanø	Frank Jensen	Frank Jensen
Favrskov	Lars Storgaard	Lars Storgaard
Faxe	Ole Vive	Mikkel B. Dam
Fredensborg	Thomas Lykke Pedersen	Thomas Lykke Pedersen
Fredericia	Christian Bro	Peder Tind
Frederiksberg	Michael Vindfeldt	Michael Vindfeldt
Frederikshavn	Karsten Thomsen	Jon Anderson
Frederikssund	Tina Tving Stauning	Anne Sofie Uhrskov
Furesø	Ole Bondo Christensen	Nicolai Bechfeldt
Faaborg-Midtfyn	Hans Stavnsager	Anstina Krogh
Gentofte	Michael Fenger	Michael Fenger
Gladsaxe	Trine Græse	Serdal Benli
Glostrup	Kasper Damsgaard	Kasper Damsgaard
Greve	Pernille Beckmann	Pernille Beckmann
Gribskov	Bent Hansen	Hanne Pigonska
Guldborgsund	Simon Hansen	Simon Hansen
Haderslev	Mads Skau	Mads Skau
Halsnæs	Steffen Jensen	Steffen Jensen
Hedensted	Ole Vind	Ole Vind
Helsingør	Benedikte Kiær	Benedikte Kiær
Herlev	Marco Damgaard	Marco Damgaard
Herning	Dorte West	Dorte West
Hillerød	Kirsten Jensen	Christoffer Lorenzen
Hjørring	Søren Smalbro	Søren Smalbro
Holbæk	Christina Krzyrosiak Hansen	Christina Krzyrosiak Hansen
Holstebro	H.C. Østerby	Kenneth Tønning
Horsens	Peter Sørensen	Peter Sørensen
Hvidovre	Anders Wolf Andresen	Anders Wolf Andresen
Høje-Taastrup	Kurt Scheelsbeck	Michael Ziegler
Hørsholm	Morten Slotved	Morten Slotved
Ikast-Brande	Ib Lauritsen	Ib Lauritsen
Ishøj	Merete Amdisen	Merete Amdisen
Jammerbugt	Mogens Christen Gade	Christian Hem
Kalundborg	Martin Damm	Martin Damm
Kerteminde	Kasper Ejsing Olesen	Michael Nielsen
Kolding	Knud Erik Langhoff	Jakob Ville
København	Lars Weiss	Sisse Marie Welling
Køge	Marie Stærke	Ken Kristensen
Langeland	Tonni Hansen	Jørgen Nielsen
Lejre	Tina Mandrup	Mikael Ralf Baade Larsen
Lemvig	Erik Flyvholm	Jens Lønberg
Lolland	Holger Schou Rasmussen	Marie-Louise Brehm Nielsen
Lyngby-Taarbæk	Sofia Osmani	Sofia Osmani
Læsø	Tobias Birch Johansen	Niels Odgaard
Mariagerfjord	Mogens Jespersen	Jesper Skov Mikkelsen
Middelfart	Johannes Lundsfryd Jensen	Anders Møllegård
Morsø	Hans Ejner Bertelsen	Jens Dahlgaard
Norddjurs	Kasper Juncher Bjerregaard	Kasper Juncher Bjerregaard
Nordfyn	Mette Landtved-Holm	Mette Landtved-Holm
Nyborg	Kenneth Muhs	Kenneth Muhs
Næstved	Carsten Rasmussne	Kenneth Sørensen
Odder	Lone Jakobi	Lone Jakobi
Odense	Peter Rahbæk Juhl	Peter Rahbæk Juhl
Odsherred	Karina Vincentz	Hanne Pigonska
Randers	Torben Hansen	Rosa Lykke Yde
Rebild	Jesper Greth	Jesper Greth
Ringkøbing-Skjern	Hans Østergaard	Lone Andersen
Ringsted	Klaus Hansen	Andreas Karlsen
Roskilde	Tomas Breddam	Tomas Breddam
Rudersdal	Ann Sofie Orth	Ann Sofie Orth
Rødovre	Britt Jensen	Britt Jensen
Samsø	Marcel Meijer	Per Urban Olsen
Silkeborg	Helle Gade	Helle Gade
Skanderborg	Frands Fischer	Frands Fischer
Skive	Peder Kirkegaard	Alfred Brunsgaard
Slagelse	Knud Vincents	Knud Vincents
Solrød	Emil Blücher	Emil Blücher
Sorø	Gert Jørgensen	Jakob Spliid
Stevns	Henning Urban Dam Nielsen	Anette Mortensen
Struer	Marianne Bredal	Marianne Bredal
Svendborg	Bo Hansen	Bo Hansen
Syddjurs	Michael Stegger Jensen	Michael Stegger Jensen
Sønderborg	Erik Lauritzen	Erik Lauritzen
Thisted	Niels Jørgen Pedersen	Niels Jørgen Pedersen
Tønder	Jørgen Popp Petersen	Jørgen Popp Petersen
Tårnby	Allan Andersen	Allan Andersen
Vallensbæk	Henrik Rasmussen	Henrik Rasmussen
Varde	Mads Sørensen	Sarah Andersen
Vejen	Frank Schmidt-Hansen	Christian Lund
Vejle	Jens Ejner Christensen	Jens Ejner Christensen
Vesthimmerland	Per Bach Laursen	Per Bach Laursen
Viborg	Ulrik Wilbek	Katrine Fusager Rohde
Vordingborg	Mikael Smed	Michael Seiding Larsen
Ærø	Peter Hansted	Peter Hansted
Source: TV 2
