= Results of the 2025 Danish municipal elections =

These are detailed results of the 2025 Danish municipal elections. Data is collected from the election distributor of Denmark.

== Seats in the councils ==
Division	A	B	C	F	I	M	O	S	V	Æ	Ø	Å	Others
Division	#	#	#	#	#	#	#	#	#	#	#	#	#
Denmark	599	97	343	249	125	6	151	12	521	123	111	7	88

=== By electoral division ===
Division	A	B	C	F	I	M	O	S	V	Æ	Ø	Å	Others
Division	#	#	#	#	#	#	#	#	#	#	#	#	#
Mid & Northern Jutland	196	23	98	75	29	0	32	0	210	68	19	2	22
Zealand & Southern Denmark	251	30	105	93	59	2	72	12	244	52	39	2	40
Capital	152	44	140	81	37	4	47	0	67	3	53	3	26

=== By constituency ===
Division	A	B	C	F	I	M	O	S	V	Æ	Ø	Å	Others
Division	#	#	#	#	#	#	#	#	#	#	#	#	#
North Jutland	74	6	44	24	8	0	9	0	82	24	6	0	4
West Jutland	47	9	22	21	10	0	11	0	74	28	3	1	13
East Jutland	75	8	32	30	11	0	12	0	54	16	10	1	5
South Jutland	70	10	30	23	15	1	24	12	98	21	8	1	7
Funen	68	8	29	26	13	0	13	0	58	10	10	1	6
Zealand	113	12	46	44	31	1	35	0	88	21	21	0	27
North Zealand	47	16	57	26	21	3	13	0	40	3	12	1	12
Greater Copenhagen	76	19	53	37	11	0	23	0	15	0	19	0	10
Copenhagen	24	9	28	15	5	1	5	0	8	0	20	2	3
Bornholm	5	0	2	3	0	0	6	0	4	0	2	0	1

=== By region ===
Division	A	B	C	F	I	M	O	S	V	Æ	Ø	Å	Others
Division	#	#	#	#	#	#	#	#	#	#	#	#	#
North Denmark	74	6	44	24	8	0	9	0	82	24	6	0	4
Central Denmark	122	17	54	51	21	0	23	0	128	44	13	2	18
Southern Denmark	138	18	59	49	28	1	37	12	156	31	18	2	13
Eastern Denmark	333	64	215	151	81	5	95	0	213	34	84	4	59

=== By municipality ===
Division	A	B	C	F	I	M	O	S	V	Æ	Ø	Å	Others
Division	#	#	#	#	#	#	#	#	#	#	#	#	#
Læsø	0	0	5	1	0	0	1	0	2	0	0	0	0
Frederikshavn	8	0	2	5	1	0	1	0	9	3	0	0	0
Hjørring	9	1	7	2	0	0	1	0	7	2	1	0	1
Brønderslev	6	0	2	2	0	0	1	0	11	2	1	0	2
Jammerbugt	7	0	4	2	1	0	1	0	10	2	0	0	0
Thisted	7	0	5	1	4	0	1	0	5	2	2	0	0
Morsø	7	2	1	1	0	0	1	0	8	1	0	0	0
Vesthimmerland	5	0	7	2	0	0	0	0	10	3	0	0	0
Rebild	5	1	4	3	0	0	0	0	7	2	0	0	1
Mariagerfjord	10	0	4	2	0	0	1	0	7	5	0	0	0
Aalborg	10	2	3	3	2	0	1	0	6	2	2	0	0
Lemvig	4	1	2	1	0	0	0	0	6	4	0	0	1
Struer	7	1	2	1	1	0	0	0	8	1	0	0	0
Skive	5	0	0	4	1	0	2	0	9	4	0	0	2
Viborg	6	0	8	2	2	0	1	0	6	4	1	1	0
Silkeborg	10	1	3	3	2	0	1	0	7	2	2	0	0
Ikast-Brande	4	0	3	0	1	0	3	0	7	2	0	0	3
Herning	3	2	2	3	1	0	1	0	15	2	0	0	2
Holstebro	5	4	1	4	1	0	2	0	8	2	0	0	0
Ringkøbing-Skjern	3	0	1	3	1	0	1	0	8	7	0	0	5
Aarhus	10	2	3	5	2	0	1	0	4	1	3	0	0
Syddjurs	9	1	3	3	0	0	0	0	6	3	1	1	0
Norddjurs	7	0	2	3	2	0	2	0	8	2	0	0	1
Randers	7	1	2	5	1	0	3	0	5	3	1	0	3
Favrskov	5	1	8	2	1	0	1	0	4	2	1	0	0
Skanderborg	9	3	3	4	2	0	1	0	5	1	1	0	0
Odder	6	0	5	2	0	0	0	0	4	0	2	0	0
Samsø	3	0	4	2	0	0	0	0	2	0	0	0	0
Horsens	12	0	2	2	2	0	2	0	5	1	1	0	0
Hedensted	7	0	0	2	1	0	2	0	11	3	0	0	1
Sønderborg	13	0	0	1	3	0	2	1	8	2	1	0	0
Aabenraa	6	1	6	2	1	0	4	2	7	2	0	0	0
Tønder	4	0	1	1	1	0	3	8	6	1	0	0	6
Fanø	0	5	3	0	0	0	0	0	1	0	1	1	0
Esbjerg	7	1	3	2	1	0	2	0	11	2	2	0	0
Varde	4	0	2	2	2	0	1	0	11	2	0	0	1
Billund	6	0	2	2	0	0	1	0	10	4	0	0	0
Vejen	5	0	5	2	1	0	2	0	10	2	0	0	0
Vejle	9	1	2	4	1	1	1	0	10	2	0	0	0
Fredericia	5	0	2	2	1	0	2	0	6	1	2	0	0
Kolding	4	1	1	3	2	0	3	0	9	1	1	0	0
Haderslev	7	1	3	2	2	0	3	1	9	2	1	0	0
Odense	10	2	4	3	2	0	1	0	5	0	2	0	0
Assens	5	1	1	3	2	0	2	0	12	2	1	0	0
Middelfart	9	0	0	2	2	0	2	0	6	2	1	1	0
Nordfyn	5	1	1	3	1	0	1	0	11	2	0	0	0
Kerteminde	5	1	8	2	3	0	1	0	1	0	1	0	3
Nyborg	6	1	1	5	1	0	1	0	10	0	0	0	0
Svendborg	10	1	2	3	1	0	2	0	5	1	4	0	0
Langeland	3	0	7	2	0	0	0	0	2	0	0	0	1
Ærø	6	0	3	1	0	0	1	0	1	2	0	0	1
Faaborg-Midtfyn	9	1	2	2	1	0	2	0	5	1	1	0	1
Lolland	6	0	2	2	0	0	2	0	2	4	2	0	5
Guldborgsund	8	0	2	2	1	1	3	0	2	2	1	0	7
Vordingborg	7	0	1	3	4	0	2	0	7	1	2	0	0
Næstved	10	2	4	2	3	0	3	0	5	1	1	0	0
Faxe	4	0	2	3	3	0	3	0	5	1	1	0	3
Stevns	5	1	3	2	1	0	2	0	4	1	0	0	0
Køge	6	0	4	3	1	0	2	0	9	0	1	0	1
Lejre	3	1	2	5	1	0	2	0	7	1	2	0	1
Greve	6	0	2	1	1	0	2	0	8	0	1	0	0
Solrød	2	0	1	1	7	0	0	0	4	1	0	0	3
Roskilde	7	1	7	5	2	0	2	0	3	0	3	0	1
Holbæk	18	1	1	2	2	0	1	0	3	2	1	0	0
Kalundborg	6	1	0	3	2	0	3	0	8	2	1	0	1
Odsherred	5	3	1	4	1	0	3	0	2	2	1	0	3
Ringsted	4	0	10	2	0	0	1	0	3	0	1	0	0
Sorø	7	1	2	2	1	0	1	0	7	1	2	0	1
Slagelse	9	1	2	2	1	0	3	0	9	2	1	0	1
Helsingør	5	1	9	3	1	1	1	0	1	1	2	0	0
Fredensborg	8	3	5	3	2	0	2	0	3	0	1	0	0
Hørsholm	1	1	7	1	3	0	0	0	3	0	0	0	3
Hillerød	5	1	7	5	2	1	1	0	4	0	1	0	0
Gribskov	2	1	7	2	1	1	2	0	2	1	1	0	3
Halsnæs	9	0	1	2	1	0	2	0	3	1	1	1	0
Frederikssund	5	0	2	3	4	0	3	0	5	0	1	0	0
Egedal	3	1	2	2	2	0	1	0	4	0	1	0	5
Furesø	6	3	5	1	1	0	1	0	3	0	1	0	0
Allerød	2	1	5	3	1	0	0	0	7	0	2	0	0
Rudersdal	1	4	7	1	3	0	0	0	5	0	1	0	1
Gentofte	1	2	10	1	1	0	0	0	3	0	1	0	0
Lyngby-Taarbæk	2	3	9	3	1	0	1	0	1	0	1	0	0
Gladsaxe	7	3	1	4	1	0	2	0	3	0	3	0	1
Herlev	8	0	2	3	1	0	1	0	2	0	2	0	0
Rødovre	8	1	3	3	0	0	2	0	0	0	2	0	0
Hvidovre	5	1	3	6	1	0	2	0	0	0	1	0	2
Brøndby	8	1	2	2	0	0	4	0	0	0	2	0	0
Vallensbæk	2	0	9	1	0	0	2	0	0	0	1	0	0
Ishøj	7	1	0	2	1	0	1	0	2	0	0	0	5
Høje-Taastrup	4	2	9	2	1	0	2	0	0	0	1	0	0
Albertslund	6	2	2	5	1	0	2	0	0	0	2	0	1
Glostrup	8	1	1	2	1	0	1	0	3	0	1	0	1
Ballerup	10	2	2	3	2	0	3	0	1	0	2	0	0
Copenhagen	8	6	7	10	3	0	2	0	3	0	13	2	1
Frederiksberg	7	3	11	2	1	0	0	0	2	0	5	0	0
Tårnby	7	0	2	2	1	1	3	0	1	0	2	0	0
Dragør	2	0	8	1	0	0	0	0	2	0	0	0	2
Bornholm	5	0	2	3	0	0	6	0	4	0	2	0	1

== Vote share ==
Division	A	B	C	F	I	M	O	S	V	Æ	Ø	Å	Others
Division	%	%	%	%	%	%	%	%	%	%	%	%	%
Denmark	23.2	5.4	12.7	11.1	5.5	1.3	5.9	0.3	17.9	4.7	7.1	1.0	4.0

=== By electoral division ===
Division	A	B	C	F	I	M	O	S	V	Æ	Ø	Å	Others
Division	%	%	%	%	%	%	%	%	%	%	%	%	%
Mid & Northern Jutland	25.8	4.5	10.5	10.7	5.1	0.9	4.6	0.0	21.5	7.7	4.4	0.7	3.7
Zealand & Southern Denmark	24.7	3.7	9.7	9.2	6.0	1.3	7.3	0.8	22.5	5.0	4.7	0.5	4.6
Capital	18.6	8.2	18.5	13.5	5.3	1.8	5.8	0.0	8.8	1.0	12.6	2.1	3.8

=== By constituency ===
Division	A	B	C	F	I	M	O	S	V	Æ	Ø	Å	Others
Division	%	%	%	%	%	%	%	%	%	%	%	%	%
North Jutland	27.6	3.7	12.1	9.0	4.9	0.9	4.1	0.0	23.1	8.5	3.7	0.3	2.2
West Jutland	18.7	4.3	9.7	9.3	4.8	0.5	4.9	0.0	28.6	10.4	2.3	0.0	6.5
East Jutland	29.1	5.2	9.9	12.7	5.5	1.1	4.7	0.0	16.0	5.4	6.2	1.3	2.9
South Jutland	22.6	2.8	8.5	8.1	5.2	1.3	8.2	2.4	28.7	6.1	3.2	0.4	2.6
Funen	27.8	5.0	10.2	10.3	5.4	1.0	5.7	0.0	21.1	3.9	5.8	0.8	2.9
Zealand	24.6	3.6	10.2	9.5	7.1	1.5	7.6	0.0	18.3	4.8	5.3	0.3	7.2
North Zealand	18.3	6.7	20.5	10.2	7.6	2.5	5.8	0.0	14.7	1.9	5.5	1.0	5.4
Greater Copenhagen	24.4	7.6	22.8	13.2	4.3	1.6	7.4	0.0	7.0	0.7	7.9	0.1	2.9
Copenhagen	14.9	9.8	15.0	15.9	4.8	1.6	4.0	0.0	5.9	0.6	20.0	4.1	3.4
Bornholm	22.1	2.3	9.6	9.6	1.3	2.2	19.9	0.0	16.0	1.9	8.9	0.0	6.2

=== By region ===
Division	A	B	C	F	I	M	O	S	V	Æ	Ø	Å	Others
Division	%	%	%	%	%	%	%	%	%	%	%	%	%
North Denmark	27.6	3.7	12.1	9.0	4.9	0.9	4.1	0.0	23.1	8.5	3.7	0.3	2.2
Central Denmark	25.1	4.8	9.8	11.4	5.2	0.9	4.8	0.0	20.9	7.3	4.7	0.8	4.3
Southern Denmark	24.8	3.8	9.2	9.0	5.3	1.2	7.1	1.4	25.4	5.1	4.3	0.6	2.7
Eastern Denmark	20.5	6.7	15.9	12.2	5.9	1.7	6.4	0.0	11.8	2.2	10.3	1.5	4.9

=== By municipality ===
Division	A	B	C	F	I	M	O	S	V	Æ	Ø	Å	Others
Division	%	%	%	%	%	%	%	%	%	%	%	%	%
Læsø	8.0	0.0	45.6	8.1	0.0	0.0	16.0	0.0	15.3	3.3	0.0	0.0	3.7
Frederikshavn	26.1	0.0	5.7	15.3	3.0	2.8	5.3	0.0	30.2	10.0	1.7	0.0	0.0
Hjørring	28.0	3.6	18.6	6.6	2.3	0.9	4.4	0.0	23.0	6.7	2.7	0.0	3.3
Brønderslev	21.4	1.1	6.6	9.0	0.0	0.9	4.4	0.0	37.1	9.2	3.1	0.0	7.3
Jammerbugt	25.1	0.8	13.1	6.5	4.8	0.0	4.8	0.0	32.5	8.5	0.0	0.0	3.8
Thisted	24.9	2.3	15.1	5.3	13.7	0.0	4.8	0.0	17.5	8.7	5.8	0.0	1.9
Morsø	31.2	6.3	8.0	5.1	0.0	0.0	5.2	0.0	34.0	7.4	2.8	0.0	0.0
Vesthimmerland	16.6	1.8	24.1	7.4	2.3	0.0	2.3	0.0	31.6	12.6	0.0	0.0	1.2
Rebild	18.4	4.3	16.6	11.1	0.0	0.0	2.7	0.0	25.8	9.2	3.7	0.0	8.2
Mariagerfjord	30.8	0.0	12.8	7.8	2.9	0.0	3.8	0.0	23.6	16.4	0.0	1.5	0.3
Aalborg	32.2	6.6	9.3	9.8	7.3	1.2	3.8	0.0	15.5	6.4	6.3	0.6	1.1
Lemvig	18.5	4.5	9.6	7.6	0.0	0.0	2.4	0.0	30.5	22.3	0.0	0.0	4.8
Struer	27.6	4.5	7.8	7.0	6.3	0.0	3.1	0.0	36.1	6.9	0.0	0.0	0.7
Skive	18.3	1.0	1.9	13.5	3.3	0.3	6.1	0.0	31.8	13.4	1.9	0.0	8.5
Viborg	18.5	1.1	22.6	7.1	5.2	1.1	4.3	0.0	18.9	11.3	2.9	3.2	3.8
Silkeborg	27.4	5.1	9.9	10.6	7.5	0.5	4.0	0.0	21.5	6.1	7.0	0.0	0.5
Ikast-Brande	18.8	0.0	12.8	3.8	3.7	0.0	12.3	0.0	29.4	7.5	0.0	0.0	11.7
Herning	10.6	6.6	5.0	8.7	4.0	0.5	4.1	0.0	45.9	7.2	1.1	0.0	6.3
Holstebro	20.4	14.2	4.9	13.9	4.3	0.8	6.8	0.0	27.5	6.8	0.0	0.0	0.4
Ringkøbing-Skjern	10.5	0.0	3.9	9.2	4.0	0.0	2.3	0.0	26.5	21.7	0.7	0.0	21.1
Aarhus	30.5	7.0	8.4	15.2	5.5	1.5	3.5	0.0	11.8	4.0	8.7	2.3	1.5
Syddjurs	28.1	3.6	11.9	12.4	2.7	0.0	2.9	0.0	19.1	9.6	5.3	3.3	1.1
Norddjurs	24.3	0.0	9.4	10.3	8.2	0.7	6.4	0.0	25.5	6.9	2.4	0.0	5.9
Randers	22.9	2.2	6.1	15.1	4.4	1.1	6.8	0.0	16.1	9.0	2.9	0.0	13.4
Favrskov	21.9	4.0	29.5	7.3	6.6	0.0	4.8	0.0	13.9	7.0	4.6	0.5	0.0
Skanderborg	29.0	11.0	10.9	11.9	6.5	1.4	3.5	0.0	16.3	5.0	3.9	0.5	0.0
Odder	24.8	3.9	21.3	11.1	3.7	0.4	4.0	0.0	21.3	0.0	9.5	0.0	0.0
Samsø	25.1	0.0	36.3	19.4	0.0	0.0	0.0	0.0	19.3	0.0	0.0	0.0	0.0
Horsens	40.3	2.8	7.3	7.4	6.8	0.7	7.8	0.0	16.5	4.0	5.4	0.0	0.9
Hedensted	24.7	0.0	2.7	5.7	4.6	0.8	6.9	0.0	37.4	9.4	2.1	0.3	5.4
Sønderborg	38.7	0.0	2.1	4.6	8.9	0.5	6.8	3.9	24.3	5.1	3.9	0.2	1.0
Aabenraa	17.4	2.0	18.9	6.6	4.6	1.2	11.3	5.6	22.8	6.7	1.3	0.0	1.6
Tønder	12.1	0.0	2.6	5.2	3.0	0.0	9.4	25.7	17.3	4.9	0.0	0.5	19.3
Fanø	4.5	42.5	23.7	4.1	0.0	0.0	0.0	0.0	7.9	0.0	7.8	6.1	3.5
Esbjerg	23.2	2.9	9.2	7.3	4.1	1.2	7.3	0.0	32.6	5.6	5.0	0.2	1.5
Varde	16.6	1.2	8.7	7.0	7.8	0.7	5.6	0.0	37.3	7.9	0.0	0.0	7.1
Billund	23.8	0.0	5.9	9.4	0.0	2.2	5.2	0.0	37.1	14.2	0.0	0.6	1.5
Vejen	18.7	1.1	18.7	6.6	3.2	2.1	7.0	0.0	35.5	6.5	0.0	0.6	0.0
Vejle	26.5	4.4	6.5	11.0	3.7	2.5	5.4	0.0	29.8	6.7	2.0	0.9	0.6
Fredericia	23.7	2.0	8.5	9.3	6.0	1.1	10.6	0.0	22.1	4.3	8.9	0.5	2.9
Kolding	15.6	5.8	6.1	11.2	7.0	1.6	12.6	0.0	30.6	3.9	4.5	0.0	1.2
Haderslev	22.6	2.7	10.0	7.0	6.0	0.0	9.9	3.1	25.5	6.8	4.5	0.5	1.3
Odense	29.6	7.1	11.5	10.5	5.7	2.0	5.3	0.0	17.0	2.0	6.7	1.0	1.9
Assens	19.0	3.1	5.5	10.1	6.1	0.0	5.6	0.0	39.8	5.5	4.1	0.6	0.7
Middelfart	31.8	2.8	3.0	8.0	6.9	0.9	6.1	0.0	23.7	7.4	3.4	2.5	3.6
Nordfyn	21.3	3.7	6.0	9.1	3.2	0.0	6.2	0.0	39.2	8.0	1.7	0.0	1.7
Kerteminde	20.3	2.6	30.9	7.9	11.2	0.5	4.2	0.0	4.5	2.3	4.6	0.0	11.0
Nyborg	24.0	3.0	3.7	17.3	4.1	0.0	5.6	0.0	34.8	3.2	1.9	1.3	1.1
Svendborg	32.3	5.2	7.3	10.2	4.6	0.0	6.1	0.0	15.6	4.1	12.8	0.9	1.0
Langeland	14.0	4.5	33.8	10.9	4.2	3.0	3.2	0.0	12.1	2.8	3.8	0.0	7.6
Ærø	30.0	3.3	19.3	8.5	2.8	0.0	3.5	0.0	6.8	10.2	0.0	0.0	15.7
Faaborg-Midtfyn	32.7	3.7	7.5	9.3	3.9	0.5	8.1	0.0	19.3	5.5	4.3	0.0	5.2
Lolland	21.0	0.4	5.6	7.8	2.3	0.0	8.9	0.0	8.1	16.2	7.0	0.0	22.5
Guldborgsund	23.9	1.5	5.5	8.1	4.0	4.1	8.8	0.0	6.9	7.1	3.5	0.0	26.7
Vordingborg	23.1	2.6	5.2	12.0	13.0	2.3	7.4	0.0	21.5	4.2	6.7	0.0	1.9
Næstved	31.1	5.9	13.0	6.9	10.2	1.0	8.5	0.0	15.4	2.8	4.4	0.8	0.0
Faxe	17.2	0.0	5.7	9.1	10.9	0.7	10.6	0.0	21.2	5.1	4.1	0.0	15.5
Stevns	25.6	3.2	14.8	8.3	5.2	4.2	8.7	0.0	19.7	5.9	3.2	1.0	0.0
Køge	18.6	2.8	12.1	11.8	5.3	1.1	5.7	0.0	28.1	2.5	3.5	0.3	8.1
Lejre	11.3	3.8	6.9	20.0	5.3	0.6	5.5	0.0	27.2	4.4	7.5	1.5	6.1
Greve	22.4	2.7	7.8	5.0	7.7	1.0	8.5	0.0	32.4	1.4	7.0	0.0	4.1
Solrød	11.9	2.4	7.4	4.2	31.4	0.0	3.0	0.0	19.4	4.1	2.0	0.0	14.2
Roskilde	21.3	5.2	19.4	14.8	7.5	2.5	7.0	0.0	10.1	1.1	7.9	0.6	2.5
Holbæk	52.3	3.4	4.0	5.2	5.1	1.0	4.8	0.0	10.8	6.1	4.8	0.5	1.8
Kalundborg	18.8	3.3	3.3	11.9	4.9	0.6	10.2	0.0	29.3	6.7	4.2	0.0	6.8
Odsherred	20.7	13.6	4.8	12.8	4.1	0.9	10.1	0.0	6.4	7.5	4.4	1.0	13.7
Ringsted	16.2	2.2	40.5	7.9	2.4	0.0	4.3	0.0	15.1	2.9	5.2	0.0	3.3
Sorø	25.0	3.6	10.3	8.4	4.4	2.8	5.5	0.0	23.5	4.0	9.0	0.0	3.4
Slagelse	25.2	2.7	6.9	8.2	4.5	1.1	9.6	0.0	25.4	6.4	4.9	0.0	5.3
Helsingør	21.2	4.3	28.3	11.1	5.4	3.2	6.0	0.0	4.9	3.7	8.1	1.4	2.5
Fredensborg	28.5	11.0	16.3	10.2	6.4	1.7	8.0	0.0	11.4	0.0	3.0	1.3	2.2
Hørsholm	7.5	7.9	33.2	4.8	13.6	1.0	0.0	0.0	17.6	0.0	0.0	0.0	14.4
Hillerød	18.3	4.8	22.6	17.6	5.7	6.3	4.8	0.0	12.8	2.6	4.5	0.0	0.1
Gribskov	10.0	4.2	25.2	9.8	4.7	5.6	10.3	0.0	7.9	3.8	4.4	1.0	13.2
Halsnæs	39.1	1.7	6.2	11.3	4.1	1.6	6.7	0.0	12.8	5.2	6.8	4.1	0.5
Frederikssund	19.5	3.1	8.0	12.6	17.7	0.6	11.0	0.0	19.5	2.8	3.7	1.4	0.2
Egedal	17.5	6.1	7.8	8.4	6.5	1.5	5.4	0.0	17.8	2.3	5.0	0.3	21.5
Furesø	23.8	12.4	23.3	6.9	4.4	0.7	3.1	0.0	14.6	0.0	7.6	0.9	2.2
Allerød	10.8	4.3	22.7	12.6	4.0	1.6	3.3	0.0	30.9	0.0	9.1	0.0	0.8
Rudersdal	6.7	12.2	27.8	5.7	10.2	2.1	2.9	0.0	19.9	0.0	6.7	0.7	5.1
Gentofte	6.3	9.6	47.3	8.2	4.5	1.6	2.1	0.0	14.3	0.5	5.3	0.0	0.1
Lyngby-Taarbæk	10.4	12.5	42.4	13.3	4.6	1.3	3.9	0.0	5.0	0.0	5.5	0.9	0.2
Gladsaxe	24.9	10.9	5.8	16.2	4.6	1.7	7.0	0.0	12.2	2.0	11.5	0.0	3.2
Herlev	38.5	3.5	13.6	13.7	5.7	1.7	5.7	0.0	6.4	0.0	11.2	0.0	0.0
Rødovre	36.8	4.1	14.1	14.0	3.0	2.4	8.1	0.0	3.1	2.2	11.2	0.0	1.1
Hvidovre	24.1	3.6	10.4	26.5	4.4	1.6	10.3	0.0	2.9	1.7	6.9	0.0	7.6
Brøndby	39.5	6.3	9.6	9.6	3.4	2.3	15.3	0.0	3.5	0.0	10.1	0.0	0.4
Vallensbæk	15.0	0.0	53.7	8.6	3.3	0.0	9.5	0.0	2.6	0.0	7.3	0.0	0.0
Ishøj	34.1	4.0	3.1	10.8	4.9	1.8	7.1	0.0	7.3	0.0	4.5	0.0	22.4
Høje-Taastrup	18.5	9.8	41.2	8.3	2.1	1.1	9.1	0.0	1.9	0.0	7.2	0.0	0.8
Albertslund	28.0	7.9	10.3	19.4	3.9	0.0	8.7	0.0	3.0	0.0	11.6	0.0	7.2
Glostrup	36.1	4.4	7.3	8.7	4.7	1.1	7.7	0.0	14.5	2.2	5.7	0.4	7.3
Ballerup	40.1	7.1	7.1	11.9	6.1	2.8	10.5	0.0	5.8	0.0	6.8	0.0	1.7
Copenhagen	12.7	10.5	11.4	17.9	5.2	1.5	3.8	0.0	6.1	0.5	22.0	4.9	3.4
Frederiksberg	20.7	9.1	33.7	8.0	2.8	1.1	1.4	0.0	5.0	0.3	15.8	1.8	0.4
Tårnby	33.4	4.0	7.6	10.7	5.2	3.7	14.6	0.0	5.9	2.5	8.3	0.0	4.0
Dragør	12.3	2.7	43.8	4.8	3.1	1.4	3.4	0.0	6.8	0.7	0.0	0.0	20.8
Bornholm	22.1	2.3	9.6	9.6	1.3	2.2	19.9	0.0	16.0	1.9	8.9	0.0	6.2

== Change by constituency ==
=== North Jutland ===
==== Number of councillors and political parties in the municipal councils ====
Sum of 98 local elections
Party		Seats		Councils (Note: / contested)		Share of vote	
Party		Seats	+ / -	Councils	+ / -	Percent	+ / -
V	Venstre	82	▼12	11 / 11	0	23.1%	▼3.3%
A	Social Democrats	74	▼18	10 / 11	▼1	27.6%	▼7.0%
C	Conservatives	44	▲2	11 / 11	0	12.1%	▼1.0%
F	Green Left	24	▲12	11 / 11	▲2	9.0%	▲4.3%
Æ	Denmark Democrats	24	▲24	10 / 11	▲10	8.5%	New
O	Danish People's Party	9	▼1	9 / 11	▼1	4.1%	▲0.2%
I	Liberal Alliance	8	▲8	4 / 7	▲4	4.9%	▲4.0%
B	Social Liberals	6	0	4 / 8	0	3.7%	▼0.4%
Ø	Red-Green Alliance	6	▼2	4 / 7	▼2	3.7%	▼0.9%
M	Moderates	0	0	0 / 4	0	0.9%	New
Å	The Alternative	0	▼1	0 / 2	▼1	0.3%	▼0.0%
	Others	4	▼14	3 / 9	▼8	2.2%	▼5.2%

==== Numbers of mayors ====
Party		Number	Change
V	Venstre	8	▼1
A	Social Democrats	2	0
C	Conservatives	1	▲1

Social Democrats
Conservatives
Venstre

Mayors outgoing and incoming
Municipality	Incumbent mayor	Elected mayor
Læsø	Tobias Birch Johansen	Niels Odgaad
Frederikshavn	Karsten Thomsen	Jon Andersen
Hjørring	Søren Smalbro	Søren Smalbro
Brønderslev	Mikael Klitgaard	Mikael Klitgaard
Jammerbugt	Mogens Christen Gade	Christian Hem
Thisted	Niels Jørgen Pedersen	Niels Jørgen Pedersen
Morsø	Hans Ejner Bertelsen	Jens Dahlgaard
Vesthimmerland	Per Bach Laursen	Per Bach Laursen
Rebild	Jesper Greth	Jesper Greth
Mariagerfjord	Mogens Jespersen	Jesper Skov Mikkelsen
Aalborg	Lasse Frimand Jensen	Lasse Frimand Jensen

=== West Jutland ===
==== Number of councillors and political parties in the municipal councils ====
Sum of 98 local elections
Party		Seats		Councils		Share of vote	
Party		Seats	+ / -	Councils	+ / -	Percent	+ / -
V	Venstre	75	▼21	9 / 9	0	28.6%	▼7.6%
A	Social Democrats	47	▼15	9 / 9	0	18.7%	▼5.8%
Æ	Denmark Democrats	28	▲28	9 / 9	▲9	10.4%	New
C	Conservatives	22	▼9	8 / 9	▼1	9.7%	▼2.4%
F	Green Left	21	▲6	8 / 9	0	9.3%	▲3.4%
O	Danish People's Party	11	▲5	7 / 9	▲2	4.9%	▲1.5%
I	Liberal Alliance	10	▲10	8 / 8	▲8	4.8%	▲3.9%
B	Social Liberals	9	▲1	5 / 7	0	4.3%	▲0.5%
Ø	Red-Green Alliance	3	0	2 / 5	0	2.3%	▼0.6%
M	Moderates	0	0	0 / 5	0	0.5%	New
Å	The Alternative	0	▼1	0 / 1	▼1	0.0%	▼0.5%
	Others	13	▼6	5 / 9	▼2	6.5%	▼3.3%

==== Numbers of mayors ====
Party		Number	Change
V	Venstre	7	0
A	Social Democrats	1	▼1
C	Conservatives	1	▲1

Social Democrats
Conservatives
Venstre

Mayors outgoing and incoming
Municipality	Incumbent mayor	Elected mayor
Lemvig	Erik Flyvholm	Jens Lønborg
Struer	Marianne Bredal	Marianne Bredal
Skive	Peder Kirkegaard	Alfred Brunsgaard
Viborg	Ulrik Wilbek	Katrine Fusager Rohde
Silkeborg	Helle Gade	Helle Gade
Ikast-Brande	Ib Lauritsen	Ib Lauritsen
Herning	Dorte West	Dorte West
Holstebro	H.C. Østerby	Kenneth Tønning
Ringkøbing-Skjern	Hans Østergaard	Lone Andersen

=== East Jutland ===
==== Number of councillors and political parties in the municipal councils ====
Sum of 98 local elections
Party		Seats		Councils		Share of vote	
Party		Seats	+ / -	Councils	+ / -	Percent	+ / -
A	Social Democrats	75	▼12	10 / 10	0	29.1%	▼1.9%
V	Venstre	54	▼7	10 / 10	0	16.0%	▼2.6%
C	Conservatives	32	▼5	9 / 10	▼1	9.9%	▼3.6%
F	Green Left	30	▲10	10 / 10	0	12.7%	▲3.0%
Æ	Denmark Democrats	16	▲16	8 / 8	▲8	5.4%	New
O	Danish People's Party	12	▲4	7 / 9	0	4.7%	▲0.9%
I	Liberal Alliance	11	▲8	7 / 9	▲6	5.5%	▲3.5%
Ø	Red-Green Alliance	10	▼2	7 / 9	▼1	6.2%	▼0.8%
B	Social Liberals	8	▼3	5 / 7	▼2	5.2%	▼1.2%
Å	The Alternative	1	0	1 / 5	0	1.3%	▲0.4%
M	Moderates	0	0	0 / 7	0	1.1%	New
	Others	5	▼9	3 / 6	▼5	2.9%	▼4.2%

==== Numbers of mayors ====
Party		Number	Change
A	Social Democrats	5	▼2
C	Conservatives	2	▲1
V	Venstre	2	0
F	Green Left	1	▲1

Social Democrats
Conservatives
Green Left
Venstre

Mayors outgoing and incoming
Municipality	Incumbent mayor	Elected mayor
Aarhus	Anders Winnerskjold	Anders Winnerskjold
Syddjurs	Michael Stegger Jensen	Michael Stegger Jensen
Norddjurs	Kasper Juncher Bjerregaard	Kasper Bjerregaard
Randers	Torben Hansen	Rosa Lykke Yde
Favrskov	Lars Storgaard	Lars Storgaard
Skanderborg	Frands Fischer	Frands Fischer
Odder	Lone Jakobi	Lone Jakobi
Samsø	Marcel Meijer	Per Urban Olsen
Horsens	Peter Sørensen	Peter Sørensen
Hedensted	Ole Vind	Ole Vind

=== South Jutland ===
==== Number of councillors and political parties in the municipal councils ====
Sum of 98 local elections
Party		Seats		Councils		Share of vote	
Party		Seats	+ / -	Councils	+ / -	Percent	+ / -
V	Venstre	98	▼9	12 / 12	0	28.7%	▼3.1%
A	Social Democrats	70	▼24	11 / 12	▼1	22.6%	▼5.6%
C	Conservatives	30	▼9	11 / 12	0	8.5%	▼2.0%
O	Danish People's Party	24	▲10	11 / 11	▲1	8.2%	▲3.2%
F	Green Left	23	▲7	11 / 12	▲2	8.1%	▲1.5%
Æ	Denmark Democrats	21	▲21	11 / 11	▲11	6.1%	New
I	Liberal Alliance	15	▲15	10 / 10	▲10	5.2%	▲4.5%
S	Schleswig Party	12	▲2	4 / 4	0	2.4%	▲0.0%
B	Social Liberals	10	▲1	6 / 9	▲1	2.8%	▼0.3%
Ø	Red-Green Alliance	8	▲4	6 / 8	▲2	3.2%	▲0.6%
M	Moderates	1	▲1	1 / 9	▲1	1.3%	New
Å	The Alternative	1	▲1	1 / 9	▲1	0.4%	▲0.0%
	Others	7	▼20	2 / 11	▼8	2.6%	▼6.1%

==== Numbers of mayors ====
Party		Number	Change
V	Venstre	8	▲3
A	Social Democrats	1	▼1
B	Social Liberals	1	0
C	Conservatives	1	▼2
S	Schleswig Party	1	0

Social Democrats
Social Liberals
Conservatives
Schleswig Party
Venstre

Mayors outgoing and incoming
Municipality	Incumbent mayor	Elected mayor
Sønderborg	Erik Lauritzen	Erik Lauritzen
Aabenraa	Jan Riber Jakobsen	Jan Riber Jakobsen
Tønder	Jørgen Popp Petersen	Jørgen Popp Petersen
Fanø	Frank Jensen	Frank Jensen
Esbjerg	Jesper Frost Rasmusssen	Jesper Frost Rasmussen
Varde	Mads Sørensen	Sarah Andersen
Billund	Stephanie Storbank	Stephanie Storbank
Vejen	Frank Schmidt-Hansen	Christian Lund
Vejle	Jens Ejner Christensen	Jens Ejner Christensen
Fredericia	Christian Bro	Peder Tind
Kolding	Knud Erik Langhoff	Jakob Ville
Haderslev	Mads Skau	Mads Skau

=== Funen ===
==== Number of councillors and political parties in the municipal councils ====
Sum of 98 local elections
Party		Seats		Councils		Share of vote	
Party		Seats	+ / -	Councils	+ / -	Percent	+ / -
A	Social Democrats	68	▼13	10 / 10	0	27.8%	▼4.2%
V	Venstre	58	▼14	10 / 10	0	21.1%	▼3.1%
C	Conservatives	29	▼4	9 / 10	▼1	10.2%	▼3.6%
F	Green Left	26	▲4	10 / 10	0	10.3%	▲2.2%
I	Liberal Alliance	13	▲13	8 / 10	▲8	5.4%	▲4.9%
O	Danish People's Party	13	▲5	9 / 10	▲2	5.7%	▲1.8%
Æ	Denmark Democrats	10	▲10	6 / 10	▲6	3.9%	New
Ø	Red-Green Alliance	10	▲1	6 / 9	0	5.8%	▲0.3%
B	Social Liberals	8	▲1	7 / 10	▲2	5.0%	▼0.3%
Å	The Alternative	1	▲1	1 / 5	▲1	0.8%	▲0.5%
M	Moderates	0	0	0 / 5	0	1.0%	New
	Others	6	▼4	4 / 10	▼2	2.9%	▼3.5%

==== Numbers of mayors ====
Party		Number	Change
A	Social Democrats	4	▼2
V	Venstre	4	▲1
C	Conservatives	2	▲2
F	Green Left	0	▼1

Social Democrats
Conservatives
Green Left
Venstre

Mayors outgoing and incoming
Municipality	Incumbent mayor	Elected mayor
Odense	Peter Rahbæk Juhl	Peter Rahbæk Juel
Assens	Søren Steen Andersen	Søren Steen Andersen
Middelfart	Johannes Lundsfryd Jensen	Anders Møllegård
Nordfyn	Mette Landtved-Holm	Mette Landtved-Holm
Kerteminde	Kasper Ejsing Olesen	Michael Nielsen
Nyborg	Kenneth Muhs	Kenneth Muhs
Svendborg	Bo Hansen	Bo Hansen
Langeland	Tonni Hansen	Jørgen Nielsen
Ærø	Peter Hansted	Peter Hansted
Faaborg-Midtfyn	Hans Stavnsager	Anstina Krogh

=== Zealand ===
==== Number of councillors and political parties in the municipal councils ====
Sum of 98 local elections
Party		Seats		Councils		Share of vote	
Party		Seats	+ / -	Councils	+ / -	Percent	+ / -
A	Social Democrats	113	▼38	17 / 17	0	24.6%	▼8.1%
V	Venstre	88	▼15	17 / 17	0	18.3%	▼3.5%
C	Conservatives	46	▼10	16 / 17	▼1	10.2%	▼1.5%
F	Green Left	44	▲16	17 / 17	▲1	9.5%	▲2.9%
O	Danish People's Party	35	▲9	16 / 17	▼1	7.6%	▲1.3%
I	Liberal Alliance	31	▲26	15 / 17	▲12	7.1%	▲5.4%
Æ	Denmark Democrats	21	▲21	13 / 17	▲13	4.8%	New
Ø	Red-Green Alliance	21	▲2	15 / 17	▼1	5.3%	▲0.2%
B	Social Liberals	12	▼2	9 / 16	▼2	3.6%	▼0.5%
M	Moderates	1	▲1	1 / 14	▲1	1.5%	New
Å	The Alternative	0	0	0 / 7	0	0.3%	▲0.1%
	Others	27	▼12	11 / 15	▼5	7.2%	▼2.6%

==== Numbers of mayors ====
Party		Number	Change
V	Venstre	7	▲2
A	Social Democrats	3	▼5
I	Liberal Alliance	2	▲1
C	Conservatives	1	0
F	Green Left	1	▲1
O	Danish People's Party	1	▲1
	Others	1	0

Social Democrats
Conservatives
Green Left
Liberal Alliance
Venstre
Local party

Mayors outgoing and incoming
Municipality	Incumbent mayor	Elected mayor
Lolland	Holger Schou Rasmussen	Marie-Louise Brehm Nielsen
Guldborgsund	Simon Hansen	Simon Hansen
Vordingborg	Mikael Smed	Michael Seiding Larsen
Næstved	Carsten Rasmussne	Kenneth Sørensen
Faxe	Ole Vive	Mikkel B. Dam
Stevns	Henning Urban Dam Nielsen	Anette Mortensen
Køge	Marie Stærke	Ken Kristensen
Lejre	Tina Mandrup	Mikael Ralf Baade Larsen
Greve	Pernille Beckmann	Pernille Beckmann
Solrød	Emil Blücher	Emil Blücher
Roskilde	Tomas Breddam	Tomas Breddam
Holbæk	Christina Krzyrosiak Hansen	Christina Krzyrosiak Hansen
Kalundborg	Martin Damm	Martin Damm
Odsherred	Karina Vincentz	
Ringsted	Klaus Hansen	Andres Karlsen
Sorø	Gert Jørgensen	Jakob Spliid
Slagelse	Knud Vincents	Henrik Brodersen

=== North Zealand ===
==== Number of councillors and political parties in the municipal councils ====
Sum of 98 local elections
Party		Seats		Councils		Share of vote	
Party		Seats	+ / -	Councils	+ / -	Percent	+ / -
C	Conservatives	57	▼5	11 / 11	0	20.5%	▼2.4%
A	Social Democrats	47	▼17	11 / 11	0	18.3%	▼5.7%
V	Venstre	40	▼15	11 / 11	0	14.7%	▼3.9%
F	Green Left	26	▲6	11 / 11	0	10.2%	▲2.8%
I	Liberal Alliance	21	▲21	11 / 11	▲11	7.6%	▲6.1%
B	Social Liberals	16	0	9 / 11	▼1	6.7%	▲0.4%
O	Danish People's Party	13	▲8	8 / 10	▲3	5.8%	▲2.4%
Ø	Red-Green Alliance	12	0	10 / 10	0	5.5%	▲0.3%
M	Moderates	3	▲3	3 / 11	▲3	2.5%	New
Æ	Denmark Democrats	3	▲3	3 / 6	▲3	1.9%	New
Å	The Alternative	1	▲1	1 / 8	▲1	1.0%	▲0.3%
	Others	12	▼5	4 / 11	▼4	5.4%	▼4.9%

==== Numbers of mayors ====
Party		Number	Change
C	Conservatives	6	▲3
V	Venstre	3	▲1
A	Social Democrats	2	▼4

Social Democrats
Conservatives
Venstre

Mayors outgoing and incoming
Municipality	Incumbent mayor	Elected mayor
Helsingør	Benedikte Kiær	Benedikte Kiær
Fredensborg	Thomas Lykke Pedersen	Thomas Lykke Pedersen
Hørsholm	Morten Slotved	Morten Slotved
Hillerød	Kirsten Jensen	Christoffer Lorenzen
Gribskov	Bent Hansen	Trine Egtved
Halsnæs	Steffen Jensen	Steffen Jensen
Frederikssund	Tina Tving Stauning	Anne Sofie Uhrskov
Egedal	Vicky Holst Rasmussen	Birgitte Neergaard-Kofod
Furesø	Ole Bondo Christensen	Nicolai Bechfeldt
Allerød	Karsten Längerich	Clara Rao
Rudersdal	Ann Sofie Orth	Anne Sofie Orth

=== Greater Copenhagen ===
==== Number of councillors and political parties in the municipal councils ====
Sum of 98 local elections
Party		Seats		Councils		Share of vote	
Party		Seats	+ / -	Councils	+ / -	Percent	+ / -
A	Social Democrats	76	▼18	13 / 13	0	24.4%	▼6.6%
C	Conservatives	53	▼19	12 / 13	▼1	22.8%	▼4.9%
F	Green Left	37	▲10	13 / 13	0	13.2%	▲3.5%
O	Danish People's Party	23	▲16	12 / 13	▲5	7.4%	▲4.0%
B	Social Liberals	19	▲6	11 / 12	▲2	7.6%	▲1.3%
Ø	Red-Green Alliance	19	▲1	12 / 13	0	7.9%	▲1.1%
V	Venstre	15	▼4	7 / 13	▼3	7.0%	▼0.1%
I	Liberal Alliance	11	▲11	10 / 13	▲10	4.3%	▲3.0%
M	Moderates	0	0	0 / 11	0	1.6%	New
Æ	Denmark Democrats	0	0	0 / 5	0	0.7%	New
Å	The Alternative	0	0	0 / 2	0	0.1%	▼0.0%
	Others	10	▼3	5 / 11	▼2	2.9%	▼3.5%

==== Numbers of mayors ====
Party		Number	Change
A	Social Democrats	6	▼2
C	Conservatives	5	▲1
F	Green Left	2	▲1

Social Democrats
Conservatives
Green Left

Mayors outgoing and incoming
Municipality	Incumbent mayor	Elected mayor
Gentofte	Michael Fenger	Michael Fenger
Lyngby-Taarbæk	Sofia Osmani	Sofia Osmani
Gladsaxe	Trine Græse	Serdal Benli
Herlev	Marco Damgaard	Marco Damgaard
Rødovre	Britt Jensen	Britt Jensen
Hvidovre	Anders Wolf Andresen	Anders Wolf Andresen
Brøndby	Maja Højgaard	Maja Højgaard
Vallensbæk	Henrik Rasmussen	Henrik Rasmussen
Ishøj	Merete Amdisen	Merete Amdisen
Høje-Taastrup	Kurt Scheelsbeck	Michael Ziegler
Albertslund	Steen Christiansen	Lars Gravgaard Hansen
Glostrup	Kasper Damsgaard	Kasper Damsgaard
Ballerup	Jesper Würtzen	Jesper Würtzen

=== Copenhagen ===
==== Number of councillors and political parties in the municipal councils ====
Sum of 98 local elections
Party		Seats		Councils		Share of vote	
Party		Seats	+ / -	Councils	+ / -	Percent	+ / -
C	Conservatives	28	▼1	4 / 4	0	15.0%	▼2.6%
A	Social Democrats	24	▼2	4 / 4	0	14.9%	▼3.4%
Ø	Red-Green Alliance	20	▼2	3 / 3	0	20.0%	▼2.2%
F	Green Left	15	▲7	4 / 4	▲1	15.9%	▲6.3%
B	Social Liberals	9	▼1	2 / 4	▼1	9.8%	▼1.1%
V	Venstre	8	▼3	4 / 4	0	5.9%	▼1.9%
I	Liberal Alliance	5	▲4	3 / 4	▲2	4.8%	▲2.4%
O	Danish People's Party	5	▲3	2 / 4	0	4.0%	▲2.0%
Å	The Alternative	2	0	1 / 2	0	4.1%	▲1.8%
M	Moderates	1	▲1	1 / 4	▲1	1.6%	New
Æ	Denmark Democrats	0	0	0 / 4	0	0.6%	New
	Others	3	▼4	2 / 4	▼1	3.4%	▼3.5%

==== Numbers of mayors ====
Party		Number	Change
A	Social Democrats	2	▼1
C	Conservatives	1	0
F	Green Left	1	▲1

Social Democrats
Conservatives
Green Left

Mayors outgoing and incoming
Municipality	Incumbent mayor	Elected mayor
Copenhagen	Lars Weiss	Sisse Marie Welling
Frederiksberg	Michael Vindfeldt	Michael Vindfeldt
Tårnby	Allan Andersen	Allan Andersen
Dragør	Kenneth Gøtterup	Kenneth Gøtterup

=== Bornholm ===
==== Number of councillors and political parties in the municipal councils ====
Sum of 98 local elections
Party		Seats		Councils		Share of vote	
Party		Seats	+ / -	Councils	+ / -	Percent	+ / -
O	Danish People's Party	6	▲2	1 / 1	0	19.9%	▲4.6%
A	Social Democrats	5	▲1	1 / 1	0	22.1%	▲6.7%
V	Venstre	4	▲2	1 / 1	0	16.0%	▲6.5%
F	Green Left	3	▲3	1 / 1	▲1	9.6%	▲6.7%
C	Conservatives	2	▼1	1 / 1	0	9.6%	▼2.8%
Ø	Red-Green Alliance	2	▼5	1 / 1	0	8.9%	▼14.1%
B	Social Liberals	0	0	0 / 1	0	2.3%	▲0.4%
I	Liberal Alliance	0	0	0 / 1	0	1.3%	▲1.3%
M	Moderates	0	0	0 / 1	0	2.2%	New
Æ	Denmark Democrats	0	0	0 / 1	0	1.9%	New
	Others	1	▼2	1 / 1	0	6.2%	▼11.6%

==== Numbers of mayors ====
Party		Number	Change
V	Venstre	1	▲1
C	Conservatives	0	▼1

Conservatives
Venstre

Mayors outgoing and incoming
Municipality	Incumbent mayor	Elected mayor
Bornholm	Jacob Trøst	Frederik Tolstrup
