= 2025 Southern Denmark regional election =

Local election in Denmark

- 18 November 2025

All 31 seats to the Southern Denmark regional council 16 seats needed for a majority
- Turnout: 683,794 (69.7%) ▲2.0%
	First party	Second party	Third party
	V	A	O
Party	Venstre	Social Democrats	Danish People's Party
Last election	17 seats, 39.2%	12 seats, 25.9%	1 seat, 4.3%
Seats won	9	8	3
Seat change	▼8	▼4	▲2
Popular vote	163,194	147,531	72,286
Percentage	25.1%	22.7%	11.1%
Swing	▼14.1%	▼3.2%	▲6.8%
	Fourth party	Fifth party	Sixth party
	F	C	Æ
Party	Green Left	Conservatives	Denmark Democrats
Last election	2 seats, 6.4%	3 seats, 7.7%	Did not stand
Seats won	3	2	2
Seat change	▲1	▼1	▲2
Popular vote	64,126	45,618	41,911
Percentage	9.9%	7.0%	6.4%
Swing	▲3.4%	▼0.7%	New
	Seventh party	Eighth party	Ninth party
	I	Ø	B
Party	Liberal Alliance	Red-Green Alliance	Social Liberals
Last election	0 seats, 0.9%	2 seats, 4.3%	2 seats, 4.2%
Seats won	2	1	1
Seat change	▲2	▼1	▼1
Popular vote	37,337	30,188	22,687
Percentage	5.7%	4.6%	3.5%
Swing	▲4.8%	▲0.3%	▼0.7%
Chairperson before election
Bo Libergren
Venstre
Chairperson after election
Bo Libergren
Venstre

The 2025 Southern Denmark Regional election was held on November 18, 2025, to elect the 31 members to sit in the regional council for the Southern Denmark Regional council, in the period of 2026 to 2029.Bo Libergren from Venstre, would take the chairperson.

== Background ==
Following the 2021 election, Stephanie Lose from Venstre became chairperson for her second term. However, Lose announced on October 25, 2025, that she would step down from the position, in case she became a minister. Following this, Bo Libergren, from Venstre as well replaced her, when she became the Minister for Economic Affairs.

Since their establishment in 2007, Denmark’s five regions have been subject to ongoing political debate. In June 2024, the government's Health Structure Commission proposed three models for reorganizing the healthcare system, two of which involved abolishing the existing regions. In the end, the regions were retained, however with a reformartion of, among other things, the regional councils. Each of the five regional councils, had 41 seats, from their first election in 2005 to the 2021 election. The reform resulted in three regions, including the North Denmark Region, retaining their existing boundaries and continuing unchanged, while the two other regions were merged to form a new entity. As part of the reform, this region will elect only 31 council members.

== Notional results 2021 ==
=== 2021 Election Results and notional results with 31 Seats Contested ===
Parties	Vote		Seats		
Parties	Votes	%	Actual Seats	Notional Seats	+ / -
Venstre	249,004	39.2	17	14	-3
Social Democrats	164,481	25.9	12	8	-4
Conservatives	48,870	7.7	3	3	0
Green Left	40,878	6.4	2	2	0
New Right	29,517	4.7	2	1	-1
Red–Green Alliance	27,322	4.3	2	1	-1
Social Liberals	26,783	4.2	2	1	-1
Danish People's Party	27,220	4.3	1	1	0
Total	310,538	100.0	41	31	-10

== Electoral system ==
For elections to Danish regional councils, a number varying from 25 to 47 are chosen to be elected to the Regional council. The seats are then allocated using the D'Hondt method and a closed list proportional representation. The Southern Denmark Region had 31 seats in 2025.

== Electoral alliances ==
=== Electoral Alliance 1 ===
Party		Political alignment
A	Social Democrats	Centre-left
M	Moderates	Centre to Centre-right

=== Electoral Alliance 2 ===
Party		Political alignment
B	Social Liberals	Centre to Centre-left
C	Conservatives	Centre-right
I	Liberal Alliance	Centre-right to Right-wing

=== Electoral Alliance 3 ===
Party		Political alignment
E	Borgerlig Fornuft	Local politics
O	Danish People's Party	Right-wing to Far-right
V	Venstre	Centre-right
Æ	Denmark Democrats	Right-wing to Far-right

=== Electoral Alliance 4 ===
Party		Political alignment
F	Green Left	Centre-left to Left-wing
Ø	Red-Green Alliance	Left-wing to Far-Left

=== Electoral Alliance 5 ===
Party		Political alignment
K	Christian Democrats	Centre to Centre-right
Å	The Alternative	Centre-left to Left-wing

== Results by constituency and municipality ==
=== Results by constituency ===
Division	A	B	C	E	F	I	K	M	O	R	V	Æ	Ø	Å
Division	%	%	%	%	%	%	%	%	%	%	%	%	%	%
South Jutland	21.8	2.6	5.7	0.3	8.0	6.0	0.8	1.9	13.0	0.1	28.1	7.4	3.6	0.7
Funen	23.9	4.7	8.8	0.2	12.3	5.4	0.3	2.2	8.6	0.1	21.1	5.1	6.1	1.2

=== Results by municipality ===
Division	A	B	C	E	F	I	K	M	O	R	V	Æ	Ø	Å
Division	%	%	%	%	%	%	%	%	%	%	%	%	%	%
Sønderborg	29.8	1.5	3.0	0.2	6.0	6.3	0.7	1.6	12.9	0.1	26.7	6.8	3.9	0.5
Aabenraa	19.9	1.7	9.2	0.2	6.9	5.3	1.0	1.4	17.2	0.1	26.0	8.2	2.5	0.5
Tønder	15.0	1.0	2.8	0.2	6.0	3.7	1.5	1.2	15.6	0.2	41.8	8.8	1.6	0.6
Fanø	15.1	25.8	8.3	0.5	8.6	3.0	0.1	1.0	6.4	0.2	15.7	3.1	10.4	1.9
Esbjerg	23.3	2.2	7.6	1.1	8.4	5.7	0.5	1.5	10.5	0.1	27.2	7.0	4.5	0.4
Varde	19.5	1.5	3.8	0.3	6.3	8.1	1.0	1.3	10.1	0.0	35.0	11.0	1.6	0.4
Billund	22.0	1.3	3.0	0.2	4.7	4.2	0.6	2.2	10.2	0.1	35.5	13.6	1.7	0.8
Vejen	20.5	1.7	7.5	0.4	6.1	5.3	0.6	1.8	13.4	0.1	29.9	10.3	1.8	0.6
Vejle	23.1	3.9	5.5	0.1	10.2	5.9	0.9	2.7	9.9	0.2	26.8	6.7	3.1	1.1
Fredericia	23.0	2.0	6.8	0.3	8.8	6.4	0.5	1.8	13.8	0.1	23.0	5.3	7.4	0.7
Kolding	17.4	4.3	5.5	0.1	10.4	7.7	0.8	3.0	14.9	0.1	26.1	5.2	4.0	0.6
Haderslev	20.7	2.2	5.3	0.1	7.4	5.6	1.4	1.1	19.4	0.1	25.5	7.0	3.6	0.7
Odense	24.0	6.1	10.7	0.1	12.6	5.5	0.4	3.1	7.6	0.1	18.2	2.7	7.4	1.5
Assens	21.3	3.4	5.2	0.1	11.2	5.7	0.4	1.2	9.9	0.1	28.9	7.3	4.2	1.1
Middelfart	23.2	4.2	5.5	0.2	9.8	6.9	0.4	2.0	9.5	0.1	24.5	8.6	3.7	1.4
Nordfyn	24.2	2.3	4.2	0.2	8.7	3.6	0.2	1.1	9.3	0.1	34.6	8.1	2.7	0.7
Kerteminde	21.0	2.6	21.2	0.3	11.4	9.2	0.4	1.6	9.3	0.1	12.8	5.0	4.4	0.7
Nyborg	22.9	3.9	5.0	0.1	15.2	4.2	0.2	1.2	9.4	0.1	27.4	5.5	3.6	1.2
Svendborg	24.4	4.9	6.2	0.1	16.1	4.9	0.3	1.3	7.6	0.1	17.4	5.2	10.1	1.3
Langeland	16.2	3.7	10.8	0.2	13.8	3.5	0.3	3.1	9.8	0.1	26.0	6.2	5.1	1.2
Ærø	14.8	2.0	16.5	0.2	10.8	1.7	0.1	0.9	6.5	0.1	26.5	12.4	6.3	1.3
Faaborg-Midtfyn	30.6	3.6	6.9	0.2	10.5	4.8	0.3	1.6	10.5	0.1	18.8	7.1	4.2	0.9

== Results ==
Party		Votes	%	+/-	Seats	+/-
Southern Denmark Region
V	Venstre	163,194	25.10	-14.12	9	-8
A	Social Democrats	147,531	22.69	-3.21	8	-4
O	Danish People's Party	72,286	11.12	+6.83	3	+2
F	Green Left	64,126	9.86	+3.42	3	+1
C	Conservatives	45,618	7.02	-0.68	2	-1
Æ	Denmark Democrats	41,911	6.45	New	2	New
I	Liberal Alliance	37,337	5.74	+4.80	2	+2
Ø	Red-Green Alliance	30,188	4.64	+0.34	1	-1
B	Social Liberals	22,687	3.49	-0.73	1	-1
M	Moderates	13,085	2.01	New	0	New
Å	The Alternative	5,888	0.91	+0.46	0	0
K	Christian Democrats	3,949	0.61	-0.34	0	0
E	Borgerlig Fornuft	1,660	0.26	New	0	New
R	Kommunistisk Parti	727	0.11	New	0	New
Total		650,187	100	N/A	31	N/A
Invalid votes		2,218	0.22	-0.06		
Blank votes		31,389	3.16	+0.53		
Turnout		683,794	68.92	+1.99		
Source: valg.dk

== Opinion polls ==
Polling firm	Fieldwork date	Sample size	V	A	C	F	Ø	O	B	I	K	Å	E	M	R	Æ	Others	Lead
Epinion	4 Sep - 13 Oct 2025	588	18.2	27.5	8.1	10.2	5.6	6.0	3.1	7.5	–	0.5	–	1.7	–	11.1	0.4	9.3
2024 european parliament election	9 Jun 2024		18.2	17.8	8.6	14.5	4.6	7.4	5.3	7.0	–	2.0	–	5.6	–	9.0	–	0.4
2022 general election	1 Nov 2022		14.5	30.1	5.0	6.8	3.3	2.7	2.6	7.1	0.6	2.0	–	9.6	–	10.0	–	15.6
2021 municipal elections	16 Nov 2021		28.6	29.8	11.9	7.2	3.8	4.6	4.0	0.7	0.6	0.4	–	–	–	–	–	1.2
2021 regional election	16 Nov 2021		39.2 (17)	25.9 (12)	7.7 (3)	6.4 (2)	4.3 (2)	4.3 (1)	4.2 (2)	0.9 (0)	0.9 (0)	0.4 (0)	–	–	–	–	–	13.3
