= 2021 Fredensborg municipal election =

- 16 November 2021

All 27 seats to the Fredensborg Municipal Council 14 seats needed for a majority
- Turnout: 22,432 (70.0%) ▼3.2pp
	First party	Second party	Third party
	A	C	V
Party	Social Democrats	Conservatives	Venstre
Last election	10 seats, 31.6%	2 seats, 8.5%	7 seats, 21.7%
Seats won	8	7	5
Seat change	▼2	▲5	▼2
Popular vote	6,529	4,860	3,492
Percentage	29.5%	22.0%	15.8%
Swing	▼2.1%	▲13.5%	▼5.9%
	Fourth party	Fifth party	Sixth party
	B	F	D
Party	Social Liberals	Green Left	New Right
Last election	3 seats, 10.0%	1 seat, 5.4%	0 seats, 1.4%
Seats won	3	2	1
Seat change	0	▲1	▲1
Popular vote	2,534	1,694	1,024
Percentage	11.4%	7.6%	4.6%
Swing	▲1.4%	▲2.2%	▲3.2%
	Seventh party	Eighth party	Ninth party
	Ø	O	I
Party	Red–Green Alliance	Danish People's Party	Liberal Alliance
Last election	1 seat, 2.8%	2 seats, 7.0%	1 seat, 6.2%
Seats won	1	0	0
Seat change	0	▼2	▼1
Popular vote	641	532	507
Percentage	2.9%	2.4%	2.3%
Swing	▲0.1%	▼4.6%	▼3.9%
Mayor before election
Thomas Lykke Pedersen
Social Democrats
Mayor after election
Thomas Lykke Pedersen
Social Democrats

Counting from the first election that was held since the 2007 municipal reform, all elections had resulted in the Social Democrats winning the mayor's position.

In the 2017 election, the Social Democrats had become the largest party with 10 seats. They would also secure the mayor's position for a third term

In this election, the Conservatives would for the first time in their history (Note: Counting since the municipality was altered in 2007) become the largest blue party of a municipal election in the municipality. However, Thomas Lykke Pedersen from the Social Democrats, incumbent mayor, managed to secure a 4th term with support of the red bloc parties.

== Electoral system ==
For elections to Danish municipalities, a number varying from 9 to 31 are chosen to be elected to the municipal council. The seats are then allocated using the D'Hondt method and a closed list proportional representation. Fredensborg Municipality had 27 seats in 2021

Unlike in Danish General Elections, in elections to municipal councils, electoral alliances are allowed.

== Electoral alliances ==
=== Electoral Alliance 1 ===
Party		Political alignment
B	Social Liberals	Centre to Centre-left
F	Green Left	Centre-left to Left-wing
Ø	Red–Green Alliance	Left-wing to Far-Left
Å	The Alternative	Centre-left to Left-wing

=== Electoral Alliance 2 ===
Party		Political alignment
C	Conservatives	Centre-right
D	New Right	Right-wing to Far-right
I	Liberal Alliance	Centre-right to Right-wing
K	Christian Democrats	Centre to Centre-right
M	Marie Mynche	Local politics
O	Danish People's Party	Right-wing to Far-right
V	Venstre	Centre-right

== Results by polling station ==
M = Marie Mynche

Division	A	B	C	D	F	I	K	M	O	V	Ø	Å
Division	%	%	%	%	%	%	%	%	%	%	%	%
Asminderød	26.3	9.3	25.9	5.9	6.0	2.5	0.5	0.1	3.4	17.3	2.2	0.7
Fredensborg	19.3	13.1	28.9	4.7	6.6	1.9	0.3	0.1	1.2	20.7	2.1	1.0
Humlebæk	22.8	17.3	22.2	3.8	7.2	2.6	0.3	0.0	1.5	16.8	4.0	1.6
Baunebjerg	29.6	13.5	15.8	4.6	9.9	2.0	0.3	0.1	2.0	16.5	3.9	1.7
Nivå	37.2	9.3	17.4	2.4	13.8	1.4	0.6	0.2	2.5	11.5	3.3	0.5
Karlebo	19.4	9.2	26.5	7.0	5.5	3.6	0.1	0.0	2.5	23.5	2.2	0.7
Kokkedal	37.7	10.7	21.7	4.6	5.0	2.2	0.4	0.1	2.8	11.9	2.4	0.6
Niverød	33.1	7.7	18.0	4.8	10.5	3.1	0.5	0.1	2.9	15.3	3.2	0.8

== Results ==
Party		Votes	%	+/-	Seats	+/-
Fredensborg Municipality
A	Social Democrats	6,529	29.50	-2.06	8	-2
C	Conservatives	4,860	21.96	+13.45	7	+5
V	Venstre	3,492	15.78	-5.94	5	-2
B	Social Liberals	2,534	11.45	+1.45	3	0
F	Green Left	1,694	7.65	+2.22	2	+1
D	New Right	1,024	4.63	+3.25	1	+1
Ø	Red-Green Alliance	641	2.90	+0.11	1	0
O	Danish People's Party	532	2.40	-4.62	0	-2
I	Liberal Alliance	507	2.29	-3.87	0	-1
Å	The Alternative	209	0.94	-1.49	0	0
K	Christian Democrats	87	0.39	New	0	New
M	Marie Mynche	22	0.10	New	0	New
Total		22,131	100	N/A	27	N/A
Invalid votes		54	0.17	-0.02		
Blank votes		247	0.77	+0.20		
Turnout		22,432	69.99	-3.17		
Source: valg.dk
