= 2025 Fredensborg municipal election =

Municipal election in Denmark

- 18 November 2025

All 27 seats to the Fredensborg municipal council 14 seats needed for a majority
- Turnout: 23,492 (71.4%) ▲1.4%
	First party	Second party	Third party
	A	C	V
Party	Social Democrats	Conservatives	Venstre
Last election	8 seats, 29.5%	7 seats, 22.0%	5 seats, 15.8%
Seats won	8	5	3
Seat change	0	▼2	▼2
Popular vote	6,620	3,776	2,645
Percentage	28.5%	16.3%	11.4%
Swing	▼1.0%	▼5.7%	▼4.4%
	Fourth party	Fifth party	Sixth party
	B	F	O
Party	Social Liberals	Green Left	Danish People's Party
Last election	3 seats, 11.5%	2 seats, 7.7%	0 seats, 2.4%
Seats won	3	3	2
Seat change	0	▲1	▲2
Popular vote	2,545	2,356	1,861
Percentage	11.0%	10.2%	8.0%
Swing	▼0.5%	▲2.5%	▲5.6%
	Seventh party	Eighth party
	I	Ø
Party	Liberal Alliance	Red-Green Alliance
Last election	0 seats, 2.3%	1 seat, 2.9%
Seats won	2	1
Seat change	▲2	0
Popular vote	1,490	690
Percentage	6.4%	3.0%
Swing	▲4.1%	▲0.1%
Mayor before election
Thomas Lykke Pedersen
Social Democrats
Mayor after election
Thomas Lykke Pedersen
Social Democrats

The 2025 Fredensborg Municipal election was held on November 18, 2025, to elect the 27 members to sit in the regional council for the Fredensborg Municipal council, in the period of 2026 to 2029. Thomas Lykke Pedersen from the Social Democrats, would secure re-election.

== Background ==
Following the 2021 election, Thomas Lykke Pedersen from Social Democrats became mayor for his fourth term. He would run for a fifth term. Throughout the current period, a total of 7 councillors has switched party affiliation or turned independent, creating 3 new local parties, namely Byrådsgruppen Fredensborg SocialKonservative, Aktive Liberale and Uafhænging Liberal.

== Electoral system ==
For elections to Danish municipalities, a number varying from 9 to 31 are chosen to be elected to the municipal council. The seats are then allocated using the D'Hondt method and a closed list proportional representation. Fredensborg Municipality had 27 seats in 2025.

== Electoral alliances ==
=== Electoral Alliance 1 ===
Party		Political alignment
A	Social Democrats	Centre-left
B	Social Liberals	Centre to Centre-left
M	Moderates	Centre to Centre-right

=== Electoral Alliance 2 ===
Party		Political alignment
C	Conservatives	Centre-right
E	Fredensborg SocialKonservative	Local politics
I	Liberal Alliance	Centre-right to Right-wing
K	Christian Democrats	Centre to Centre-right
O	Danish People's Party	Right-wing to Far-right
V	Venstre	Centre-right

=== Electoral Alliance 3 ===
Party		Political alignment
F	Green Left	Centre-left to Left-wing
Ø	Red-Green Alliance	Left-wing to Far-Left
Å	The Alternative	Centre-left to Left-wing

== Results by polling station ==
Division	A	B	C	E	F	I	K	M	O	V	Ø	Å
Division	%	%	%	%	%	%	%	%	%	%	%	%
Asminderød	25.3	8.9	18.5	4.0	7.9	7.0	0.3	1.7	10.5	13.2	1.7	0.8
Fredensborg (Endrupskolens Hal)	19.1	11.6	23.7	5.8	8.8	6.4	0.4	1.6	6.4	12.8	2.6	0.9
Humlebæk	26.4	15.2	17.7	1.0	9.6	6.9	0.3	2.1	5.5	10.1	3.4	1.8
Baunebjerg	31.5	12.2	12.1	0.8	12.9	5.8	0.2	1.3	8.0	9.0	3.7	2.3
Kokkedal	33.4	13.0	14.8	0.4	7.9	6.3	0.2	1.8	8.4	10.0	2.8	0.9
Niverød	32.0	7.0	13.6	0.3	13.5	7.3	0.2	1.8	9.7	9.8	3.7	1.2
Karlebo	15.7	7.6	16.5	2.2	7.4	8.0	2.9	2.4	7.9	26.0	1.6	1.8
Nivå	34.0	8.1	13.2	0.7	14.8	4.4	0.3	1.5	6.2	11.3	4.3	1.2

== Results ==
Party		Votes	%	+/-	Seats	+/-
Fredensborg Municipality
A	Social Democrats	6,620	28.54	-0.96	8	0
C	Conservatives	3,776	16.28	-5.68	5	-2
V	Venstre	2,645	11.40	-4.38	3	-2
B	Social Liberals	2,545	10.97	-0.48	3	0
F	Green Left	2,356	10.16	+2.50	3	+1
O	Danish People's Party	1,861	8.02	+5.62	2	+2
I	Liberal Alliance	1,490	6.42	+4.13	2	+2
Ø	Red-Green Alliance	690	2.97	+0.08	1	0
E	Fredensborg SocialKonservative	431	1.86	New	0	New
M	Moderates	403	1.74	New	0	New
Å	The Alternative	296	1.28	+0.33	0	0
K	Christian Democrats	82	0.35	-0.04	0	0
Total		23,195	100	N/A	27	N/A
Invalid votes		73	0.22	+0.05		
Blank votes		224	0.68	-0.05		
Turnout		23,492	71.36	+1.36		
Source: valg.dk

== Opinion polls ==
Polling firm	Fieldwork date	Sample size	A	C	V	B	F	Ø	O	I	Å	K	E	M	Others	Lead
Epinion	4 Sep - 13 Oct 2025	463	26.5	14.6	12.8	5.8	11.6	4.8	7.8	12.5	1.6	–	–	2.0	0.1	11.9
2024 european parliament election	9 Jun 2024		12.7	11.8	14.3	9.6	17.5	5.5	5.3	8.6	2.7	–	–	9.0	–	3.2
2022 general election	1 Nov 2022		22.4	8.0	14.9	5.8	8.0	4.1	2.4	9.7	3.8	0.4	–	11.9	–	7.5
2021 regional election	16 Nov 2021		23.4	26.5	13.9	10.5	7.6	5.0	3.1	1.9	0.7	0.6	–	–	–	3.1
2021 municipal election	16 Nov 2021		29.5 (8)	22.0 (7)	15.8 (5)	11.5 (3)	7.7 (2)	2.9 (1)	2.4 (0)	2.3 (0)	0.9 (0)	0.4 (0)	–	–	–	7.5
