= 2025 Thisted municipal election =

Municipal election in Denmark

- 18 November 2025

All 27 seats to the Thisted municipal council 14 seats needed for a majority
- Turnout: 24,632 (72.2%) ▲2.6%
	First party	Second party	Third party
	A	V	C
Party	Social Democrats	Venstre	Conservatives
Last election	9 seats, 34.8%	7 seats, 22.8%	6 seats, 21.1%
Seats won	7	5	5
Seat change	▼2	▼2	▼1
Popular vote	6,035	4,242	3,676
Percentage	24.9%	17.5%	15.1%
Swing	▼9.9%	▼5.3%	▼6.0%
	Fourth party	Fifth party	Sixth party
	I	Æ	Ø
Party	Liberal Alliance	Denmark Democrats	Red-Green Alliance
Last election	0 seats, 1.8%	Did not stand	1 seat, 3.9%
Seats won	4	2	2
Seat change	▲4	▲2	▲1
Popular vote	3,337	2,106	1,405
Percentage	13.7%	8.7%	5.8%
Swing	▲12.0%	New	▲1.9%
	Seventh party	Eighth party
	F	O
Party	Green Left	Danish People's Party
Last election	1 seat, 3.2%	1 seat, 3.7%
Seats won	1	1
Seat change	0	0
Popular vote	1,296	1,155
Percentage	5.3%	4.8%
Swing	▲2.1%	▲1.1%
Mayor before election
Niels Jørgen Pedersen
Venstre
Mayor after election
Niels Jørgen Pedersen
Venstre

The 2025 Thisted Municipal election was held on November 18, 2025, to elect the 27 members to sit in the regional council for the Thisted Municipal council, in the period of 2026 to 2029. Despite Venstre losing 2 seats, a deal between Venstre, Conservatives, Liberal Alliance and Denmark Democrats, had been made prior to the election, securing Niels Jørgen Pedersen the mayoral position.

== Background ==
Following the 2021 election, Niels Jørgen Pedersen was elected as mayor for his party Venstre. However in August 2024, he announced his decision to not stand for re-election. However on February 25, 2025, he revealed that he was going to stand for re-election anyway.

The Alternative party won a seat in the previous election, but chose not to stand any candidates for this election.

== Electoral system ==
For elections to Danish municipalities, a number varying from 9 to 31 are chosen to be elected to the municipal council. The seats are then allocated using the D'Hondt method and a closed list proportional representation. Thisted Municipality had 27 seats in 2025.

Unlike in Danish General Elections, in elections to municipal councils, electoral alliances are allowed.

== Electoral alliances ==
=== Electoral Alliance 1 ===
Party		Political alignment
B	Social Liberals	Centre to Centre-left
F	Green Left	Centre-left to Left-wing
Ø	Red-Green Alliance	Left-wing to Far-Left

=== Electoral Alliance 2 ===
Party		Political alignment
C	Conservatives	Centre-right
I	Liberal Alliance	Centre-right to Right-wing
V	Venstre	Centre-right
Æ	Denmark Democrats	Right-wing to Far-right

=== Electoral Alliance 3 ===
Party		Political alignment
O	Danish People's Party	Right-wing to Far-right
T	Thy Borgerlige	Local politics

== Results by polling station ==
Division	A	B	C	F	I	O	T	V	Æ	Ø
Division	%	%	%	%	%	%	%	%	%	%
Thisted (Munkehallen)	30.2	1.7	12.3	6.0	16.3	3.2	0.8	17.4	6.0	6.2
Snedsted	21.0	1.2	15.3	4.3	9.7	7.5	3.7	16.2	13.4	7.6
Hurup	28.3	1.2	22.1	3.8	4.9	4.6	2.3	22.4	7.3	3.2
Hanstholm	21.1	0.4	15.0	3.8	24.6	4.5	0.6	16.2	11.6	2.2
Sjørring	21.9	1.9	15.4	6.3	13.9	4.7	3.0	15.5	9.5	7.8
Vesløs	19.5	1.3	21.3	9.0	10.1	7.3	2.6	11.1	11.7	6.0
Vestervig	27.5	1.2	27.0	4.5	5.5	5.5	2.0	15.7	8.0	3.2
Bedsted Hallen	17.0	1.2	8.4	5.3	4.5	8.1	6.5	28.2	14.0	6.8
Nors	17.4	0.7	8.0	3.1	31.7	5.8	1.0	14.5	13.9	3.8
Frøstrup	13.8	1.4	31.4	13.8	6.4	3.6	1.1	11.3	9.2	8.0
Vorupør	29.5	1.8	10.2	3.5	7.2	10.5	2.1	20.1	7.7	7.2
Koldby	21.5	1.3	20.5	4.3	6.4	6.1	3.9	18.8	11.2	6.0
Østerild	24.2	1.2	14.7	4.7	17.0	4.8	1.5	16.1	13.5	2.3
Sennels	17.9	0.8	7.2	4.4	33.7	1.7	0.4	23.9	4.9	5.1
Klitmøller	24.2	31.3	8.0	4.4	6.7	3.6	0.6	7.0	2.3	11.8

== Results ==
Party		Votes	%	+/-	Seats	+/-
Thisted Municipality
A	Social Democrats	6,035	24.86	-9.94	7	-2
V	Venstre	4,242	17.48	-5.32	5	-2
C	Conservatives	3,676	15.15	-5.97	5	-1
I	Liberal Alliance	3,337	13.75	+11.99	4	+4
Æ	Denmark Democrats	2,106	8.68	New	2	New
Ø	Red-Green Alliance	1,405	5.79	+1.86	2	+1
F	Green Left	1,296	5.34	+2.13	1	0
O	Danish People's Party	1,155	4.76	+1.08	1	0
B	Social Liberals	565	2.33	+0.30	0	0
T	Thy Borgerlige	455	1.87	New	0	New
Total		24,272	100	N/A	27	N/A
Invalid votes		72	0.21	+0.03		
Blank votes		288	0.84	+0.19		
Turnout		24,632	72.17	+2.62		
Source: valg.dk

== Opinion polls ==
Polling firm	Fieldwork date	Sample size	A	V	C	Ø	O	F	B	I	T	Æ	Others	Lead
Epinion	4 Sep - 13 Oct 2025	482	29.5	18.2	9.9	2.4	5.1	8.5	1.5	9.5	–	14.0	1.4	11.3
2024 european parliament election	9 Jun 2024		17.3	20.0	6.4	4.0	6.3	11.7	3.5	5.9	–	18.7	–	1.3
2022 general election	1 Nov 2022		33.2	16.9	4.5	2.5	1.9	4.1	1.3	5.9	–	17.8	–	15.4
2021 regional election	16 Nov 2021		33.5	26.9	19.3	3.8	3.8	3.0	2.2	1.1	–	–	–	6.6
2021 municipal election	16 Nov 2021		34.8 (9)	22.8 (7)	21.1 (6)	3.9 (1)	3.7 (1)	3.2 (1)	2.0 (0)	1.8 (0)	–	–	–	12.0
