= 2025 Hillerød municipal election =

Municipal election in Denmark

- 18 November 2025

All 27 seats to the Hillerød municipal council 14 seats needed for a majority
- Turnout: 30,466 (70.8%) ▲1.2%
	First party	Second party	Third party
	C	A	F
Party	Conservatives	Social Democrats	Green Left
Last election	5 seats, 15.9%	7 seats, 24.6%	4 seats, 13.4%
Seats won	7	5	5
Seat change	▲2	▼2	▲1
Popular vote	6,762	5,493	5,274
Percentage	22.6%	18.3%	17.6%
Swing	▲6.7%	▼6.3%	▲4.2%
	Fourth party	Fifth party	Sixth party
	V	I	M
Party	Venstre	Liberal Alliance	Moderates
Last election	6 seats, 21.6%	0 seats, 1.6%	Did not stand
Seats won	4	2	1
Seat change	▼2	▲2	▲1
Popular vote	3,830	1,697	1,878
Percentage	12.8%	5.7%	6.3%
Swing	▼8.8%	▲4.1%	New
	Seventh party	Eighth party	Ninth party
	B	O	Ø
Party	Social Liberals	Danish People's Party	Red-Green Alliance
Last election	2 seats, 6.2%	1 seat, 4.4%	1 seat, 6.6%
Seats won	1	1	1
Seat change	▼1	0	0
Popular vote	1,454	1,434	1,352
Percentage	4.8%	4.8%	4.5%
Swing	▼1.4%	▲0.4%	▼2.1%
Mayor before election
Kirsten Jensen
Social Democrats
Mayor after election
Christoffer Lorenzen
Conservatives

The 2025 Hillerød Municipal election was held on November 18, 2025, to elect the 27 members to sit in the regional council for the Hillerød Municipal council, in the period of 2026 to 2029. Trine Egtved from the Conservatives, would win the mayoral position.

== Background ==
Following the 2021 election, Kirsten Jensen from Social Democrats became mayor for her second term. She would run for a third term.

== Electoral system ==
For elections to Danish municipalities, a number varying from 9 to 31 are chosen to be elected to the municipal council. The seats are then allocated using the D'Hondt method and a closed list proportional representation. Hillerød Municipality had 27 seats in 2025.

== Electoral alliances ==
=== Electoral Alliance 1 ===
Party		Political alignment
A	Social Democrats	Centre-left
B	Social Liberals	Centre to Centre-left

=== Electoral Alliance 2 ===
Party		Political alignment
C	Conservatives	Centre-right
I	Liberal Alliance	Centre-right to Right-wing
O	Danish People's Party	Right-wing to Far-right
V	Venstre	Centre-right
Æ	Denmark Democrats	Right-wing to Far-right

=== Electoral Alliance 3 ===
Party		Political alignment
F	Green Left	Centre-left to Left-wing
Ø	Red-Green Alliance	Left-wing to Far-Left

== Results by polling station ==
Division	A	B	C	F	I	K	M	O	V	Æ	Ø
Division	%	%	%	%	%	%	%	%	%	%	%
Royal Stage	17.5	4.6	22.6	21.0	5.5	0.1	7.6	4.0	10.2	1.6	5.4
Hillerødsholmsskolen	21.3	5.2	21.8	18.9	4.8	0.1	7.2	3.9	11.2	1.9	3.8
Brødeskov	13.0	3.4	34.8	9.6	15.1	0.4	3.4	4.8	10.9	2.9	1.7
Hammersholt	20.4	5.9	12.6	28.4	6.5	0.0	4.5	3.5	9.0	1.8	7.4
Alsønderup	12.4	2.4	20.5	18.8	5.2	0.0	5.3	5.8	23.9	2.1	3.4
Ullerød	18.6	4.0	26.2	15.2	4.9	0.1	8.2	4.3	13.3	1.9	3.3
Nødebo	14.4	17.9	21.5	17.7	7.0	0.2	3.1	3.3	9.9	1.1	4.0
Gadevang	19.7	7.6	26.0	20.7	3.8	0.0	4.9	1.9	9.5	1.4	4.5
Grønnevang Skole, Østervang	20.6	4.6	20.5	19.6	4.0	0.1	5.3	5.1	12.4	1.7	6.1
Lille Lyngby	15.9	2.6	21.1	9.8	12.5	0.1	4.9	9.0	15.0	5.9	3.3
Skævinge, Harløse, Strø	12.3	2.6	25.6	9.9	7.4	0.0	6.6	6.7	20.6	4.9	3.5
Gørløse	12.4	2.7	29.3	10.5	7.0	0.0	6.1	5.2	9.6	14.2	3.0
Uvelse	32.5	4.3	17.7	9.5	5.4	0.0	3.3	7.6	11.2	6.3	2.2

== Results ==
Party		Votes	%	+/-	Seats	+/-
Hillerød Municipality
C	Conservatives	6,762	22.55	+6.65	7	+2
A	Social Democrats	5,493	18.32	-6.33	5	-2
F	Green Left	5,274	17.59	+4.21	5	+1
V	Venstre	3,830	12.77	-8.83	4	-2
M	Moderates	1,878	6.26	New	1	New
I	Liberal Alliance	1,697	5.66	+4.10	2	+2
B	Social Liberals	1,454	4.85	-1.39	1	-1
O	Danish People's Party	1,434	4.78	+0.42	1	0
Ø	Red-Green Alliance	1,352	4.51	-2.08	1	0
Æ	Denmark Democrats	785	2.62	New	0	New
K	Bjarne Holm	23	0.08	New	0	New
Total		29,982	100	N/A	27	N/A
Invalid votes		82	0.19	-0.03		
Blank votes		402	0.93	+0.02		
Turnout		30,466	70.79	+1.25		
Source: valg.dk

== Opinion polls ==
Polling firm	Fieldwork date	Sample size	A	V	C	F	Ø	B	O	I	K	M	Æ	Others	Lead
Epinion	4 Sep - 13 Oct 2025	454	19.8	10.7	13.6	17.0	7.9	5.0	8.9	6.1	–	6.6	3.9	0.4	2.8
2024 european parliament election	9 Jun 2024		13.9	13.9	11.5	18.4	6.1	9.5	5.3	7.3	–	7.7	3.8	–	4.5
2022 general election	1 Nov 2022		23.7	14.4	6.5	9.5	4.9	4.8	2.2	8.8	–	12.0	4.5	–	9.3
2021 regional election	16 Nov 2021		24.2	18.0	18.8	10.3	6.8	7.8	3.8	1.8	–	–	–	–	5.4
2021 municipal election	16 Nov 2021		24.6 (7)	21.6 (6)	15.9 (5)	13.4 (4)	6.6 (1)	6.2 (2)	4.4 (1)	1.6 (0)	–	–	–	–	3.0
