= 2021 Albertslund municipal election =

- 16 November 2021

All 21 seats to the Albertslund Municipal Council 11 seats needed for a majority
- Turnout: 23,189 (61.9%) ▼4.2pp
	First party	Second party	Third party
	A	F	C
Party	Social Democrats	Green Left	Conservatives
Last election	9 seats, 41.9%	2 seats, 8.7%	2 seats, 6.9%
Seats won	7	4	4
Seat change	▼2	▲2	▲2
Popular vote	4,417	2,365	1,744
Percentage	34.1%	18.2%	13.4%
Swing	▼7.8%	▲9.5%	▲6.5%
	Fourth party	Fifth party	Sixth party
	Ø	B	O
Party	Red–Green Alliance	Social Liberals	Danish People's Party
Last election	2 seats, 11.4%	1 seat, 4.5%	3 seats, 13.0%
Seats won	2	2	1
Seat change	0	▲1	▼2
Popular vote	1,432	1,012	680
Percentage	11.0%	7.8%	5.2%
Swing	▼0.4%	▲3.3%	▼7.8%
	Seventh party	Eighth party
	V	Å
Party	Venstre	The Alternative
Last election	1 seat, 6.1%	1 seat, 4.6%
Seats won	1	0
Seat change	0	▼1
Popular vote	571	217
Percentage	4.4%	1.7%
Swing	▼1.7%	▼2.9%
Mayor before election
Steen Christiansen
Social Democrats
Mayor after election
Steen Christiansen
Social Democrats

Albertslund Municipality has in its history been a strong area for parties of the red bloc. In the 2019 Danish general election, it would become the municipality where the bloc received the 2nd highest % of votes. Ever since 1947 the Social Democrats had also held the mayor's position.

In the 2017 election, the Social Democrats had won 9 seats, and become the largest party. They would also secure the mayor's position.

In this election, the Social Democrats would lose 2 seats. The Green Left would on the other hand gain 2 seats, and this would create some dramatic post-election negotitations. At first Vivi Nør Jacobsen from the Green Left announced that her party along with the Social Democrats and the Social Liberals had reached an agreement that would see her becoming the new mayor. However, the parties outside the agreement, namely the Conservatives, the Danish People's Party, Venstre and the Red–Green Alliance in response, shockingly had decided to support the continuation of Steen Christiansen as mayor. The Social Democrats would eventually accept the offer from the parties, and Steen Christiansen would continue for a fourth term.

== Electoral system ==
For elections to Danish municipalities, a number varying from 9 to 31 are chosen to be elected to the municipal council. The seats are then allocated using the D'Hondt method and a closed list proportional representation. Albertslund Municipality had 21 seats in 2021

Unlike in Danish General Elections, in elections to municipal councils, electoral alliances are allowed.

== Electoral alliances ==
=== Electoral Alliance 1 ===
Party		Political alignment
B	Social Liberals	Centre to Centre-left
F	Green Left	Centre-left to Left-wing
G	Vegan Party	Single-issue
Ø	Red–Green Alliance	Left-wing to Far-Left
Å	The Alternative	Centre-left to Left-wing

=== Electoral Alliance 2 ===
Party		Political alignment
C	Conservatives	Centre-right
D	New Right	Right-wing to Far-right
I	Liberal Alliance	Centre-right to Right-wing
O	Danish People's Party	Right-wing to Far-right
V	Venstre	Centre-right

== Results by polling station ==
Division	A	B	C	D	F	G	I	O	V	Ø	Å
Division	%	%	%	%	%	%	%	%	%	%	%
Herstedøster Skole	29.2	5.5	19.5	2.6	18.8	0.6	0.7	3.6	4.6	12.0	2.9
Egelundskolen	30.2	6.3	20.6	2.8	17.3	0.2	1.0	5.1	4.8	10.7	0.9
Herstedlund Skole	36.1	12.6	9.8	3.0	17.5	0.2	0.7	5.5	3.2	10.4	1.1
Kongsholmcenteret	37.6	6.8	7.5	4.4	15.9	0.4	1.2	8.0	3.7	12.0	2.4
Herstedvester Skole	37.7	8.5	8.9	2.1	20.6	0.2	0.8	4.8	5.2	10.2	1.1

== Results ==
Party		Votes	%	+/-	Seats	+/-
Albertslund Municipality
A	Social Democrats	4,417	34.07	-7.84	7	-2
F	Green Left	2,365	18.24	+9.51	4	+2
C	Conservatives	1,744	13.45	+6.51	4	+2
Ø	Red-Green Alliance	1,432	11.05	-0.39	2	0
B	Social Liberals	1,012	7.81	+3.28	2	+1
O	Danish People's Party	680	5.25	-7.76	1	-2
V	Venstre	571	4.40	-1.66	1	0
D	New Right	371	2.86	New	0	New
Å	The Alternative	217	1.67	-2.91	0	-1
I	Liberal Alliance	115	0.89	-0.99	0	0
G	Vegan Party	40	0.31	New	0	New
Total		12,964	100	N/A	21	N/A
Invalid votes		77	0.36	+0.05		
Blank votes		148	0.69	+0.03		
Turnout		13,189	61.92	-4.15		
Source: valg.dk
