= 2025 Gribskov municipal election =

Municipal election in Denmark

- 18 November 2025

All 23 seats to the Gribskov municipal council 12 seats needed for a majority
- Turnout: 24,042 (70.1%) ▲0.3%
	First party	Second party	Third party
	C	G	O
Party	Conservatives	Nytgribskov	Danish People's Party
Last election	6 seats, 22.8%	4 seats, 16.2%	1 seat, 4.5%
Seats won	7	3	2
Seat change	▲1	▼1	▲1
Popular vote	5,976	2,586	2,439
Percentage	25.2%	10.9%	10.3%
Swing	▲2.4%	▼5.3%	▲5.8%
	Fourth party	Fifth party	Sixth party
	A	F	V
Party	Social Democrats	Green Left	Venstre
Last election	2 seats, 12.0%	2 seats, 8.3%	5 seats, 19.2%
Seats won	2	2	2
Seat change	0	0	▼3
Popular vote	2,374	2,318	1,866
Percentage	10.0%	9.8%	7.9%
Swing	▼2.0%	▲1.5%	▼11.3%
	Seventh party	Eighth party	Ninth party
	M	I	Ø
Party	Moderates	Liberal Alliance	Red-Green Alliance
Last election	Did not stand	Did not stand	1 seat, 5.3%
Seats won	1	1	1
Seat change	▲1	▲1	0
Popular vote	1,320	1,110	1,042
Percentage	5.6%	4.7%	4.4%
Swing	New	New	▼1.0%
Mayor before election
Bent Hansen
Venstre
Mayor after election
Trine Egtved
Conservatives

The 2025 Gribskov Municipal election was held on November 18, 2025, to elect the 23 members to sit in the regional council for the Gribskov Municipal council, in the period of 2026 to 2029. Trine Egtved from the Conservatives, would win the mayoral position.

== Background ==
Following the 2021 election, Bent Hansen from Venstre became mayor for his first term. He would run for a second term.

== Electoral system ==
For elections to Danish municipalities, a number varying from 9 to 31 are chosen to be elected to the municipal council. The seats are then allocated using the D'Hondt method and a closed list proportional representation. Gribskov Municipality had 23 seats in 2025.

== Electoral alliances ==
=== Electoral Alliance 1 ===
Party		Political alignment
A	Social Democrats	Centre-left
F	Green Left	Centre-left to Left-wing
Ø	Red-Green Alliance	Left-wing to Far-Left

=== Electoral Alliance 2 ===
Party		Political alignment
B	Social Liberals	Centre to Centre-left
K	Christian Democrats	Centre to Centre-right
Å	The Alternative	Centre-left to Left-wing

=== Electoral Alliance 3 ===
Party		Political alignment
C	Conservatives	Centre-right
I	Liberal Alliance	Centre-right to Right-wing
L	Listen ByogLand	Local politics
O	Danish People's Party	Right-wing to Far-right
Æ	Denmark Democrats	Right-wing to Far-right

=== Electoral Alliance 4 ===
Party		Political alignment
E	Borgernes Gribskov	Local politics
N	Folkestyret.dk	Local politics
U	Alliancen for Børnene, Ungdommen og Fremtiden	Local politics

=== Electoral Alliance 5 ===
Party		Political alignment
G	Nytgribskov	Local politics
M	Moderates	Centre to Centre-right
V	Venstre	Centre-right

== Results by polling station ==
Division	A	B	C	D	E	F	G	I	K	L	M	O	U	V	Æ	Ø	Å	Others
Division	%	%	%	%	%	%	%	%	%	%	%	%	%	%	%	%	%	%
Blistrup	10.0	3.2	23.0	0.4	0.4	9.2	9.9	6.2	0.1	1.2	3.9	12.9	0.6	10.3	4.2	3.6	0.9	0.0
Esbønderup	8.1	10.2	19.9	0.1	0.2	11.0	6.6	5.3	0.2	1.7	4.5	10.9	0.6	8.2	3.7	5.9	2.9	0.0
Valby	6.0	3.8	20.3	0.0	0.0	11.4	10.8	6.7	0.3	1.3	5.4	7.0	0.6	16.8	3.5	5.1	1.0	0.0
Græsted	10.8	3.7	21.2	0.2	0.1	9.7	9.3	4.4	1.2	1.8	4.9	12.3	0.5	9.7	4.8	4.0	1.1	0.0
Annisse	7.5	5.8	23.0	0.2	0.1	7.1	12.6	6.3	0.2	0.2	11.9	7.8	0.6	7.2	5.1	2.4	1.6	0.0
Gilleleje	10.6	2.4	35.3	0.2	0.3	10.0	7.5	3.8	0.2	0.6	3.8	8.9	0.3	6.9	3.2	5.2	0.6	0.0
Søborg Forsamlingshus	8.6	3.9	21.5	0.5	0.4	12.1	10.1	4.9	0.6	1.3	3.3	9.1	0.8	9.3	5.2	7.2	1.1	0.0
Helsinge	12.5	3.2	23.6	0.1	0.2	8.5	12.5	4.3	0.4	0.8	8.0	11.2	0.3	7.2	2.9	3.5	0.6	0.0
Mårum	8.0	3.1	21.8	0.5	0.3	11.6	11.0	4.8	0.7	1.5	4.9	9.8	0.3	13.0	3.3	4.1	1.3	0.0
Ramløse	8.3	4.3	30.4	0.7	0.3	9.8	10.2	4.5	0.0	0.5	6.1	8.0	0.2	7.3	5.1	3.8	0.3	0.0
Vejby	9.9	3.5	21.5	0.2	0.1	9.5	16.3	4.9	0.1	0.4	4.0	12.6	0.8	5.1	4.1	5.1	1.3	0.0
Tibirke	8.3	7.7	23.1	0.2	0.1	14.6	20.5	3.0	0.1	0.2	2.5	6.6	0.3	3.3	1.6	6.5	1.1	0.0

== Results ==
Party		Votes	%	+/-	Seats	+/-
Gribskov Municipality
C	Conservatives	5,976	25.19	+2.41	7	+1
G	Nytgribskov	2,586	10.90	-5.31	3	-1
O	Danish People's Party	2,439	10.28	+5.82	2	+1
A	Social Democrats	2,374	10.01	-2.03	2	0
F	Green Left	2,318	9.77	+1.48	2	0
V	Venstre	1,866	7.87	-11.34	2	-3
M	Moderates	1,320	5.57	New	1	New
I	Liberal Alliance	1,110	4.68	New	1	New
Ø	Red-Green Alliance	1,042	4.39	-0.95	1	0
B	Social Liberals	991	4.18	+0.70	1	0
Æ	Denmark Democrats	905	3.82	New	1	New
Å	The Alternative	242	1.02	New	0	New
L	Listen ByogLand	213	0.90	New	0	New
U	Alliancen for Børnene, Ungdommen og Fremtiden	107	0.45	New	0	New
K	Christian Democrats	85	0.36	New	0	New
D	New Right	60	0.25	-6.16	0	-1
E	Borgernes Gribskov	50	0.21	New	0	New
N	Folkestyret.dk	35	0.15	New	0	New
Total		23,719	100	N/A	23	N/A
Invalid votes		74	0.21	0.0		
Blank votes		356	1.03	+0.03		
Turnout		24,149	70.06	+0.63		
Source: valg.dk

== Opinion polls ==
Polling firm	Fieldwork date	Sample size	C	V	G	A	F	D	Ø	O	B	I	K	M	Æ	Others	Lead
Epinion	4 Sep - 13 Oct 2025	429	21.6	10.3	–	12.3	11.0	–	6.1	10.3	2.9	6.4	–	3.9	6.9	5.1	9.3
2024 european parliament election	9 Jun 2024		10.3	13.7	–	13.1	16.4	–	5.4	8.9	5.5	7.1	–	10.7	6.9	–	2.7
2022 general election	1 Nov 2022		5.8	12.8	–	24.5	6.7	5.8	3.9	3.8	2.7	7.5	0.6	14.2	8.0	–	10.3
2021 regional election	16 Nov 2021		22.3	19.9	–	20.0	7.5	6.8	6.8	5.6	4.9	1.3	1.6	–	–	–	2.3
2021 municipal election	16 Nov 2021		22.8 (6)	19.2 (5)	16.2 (4)	12.0 (2)	8.3 (2)	6.4 (1)	5.3 (1)	4.5 (1)	3.5 (1)	–	–	–	–	–	3.6
