= 2025 Albertslund municipal election =

Municipal election in Denmark

- 18 November 2025

All 21 seats to the Albertslund municipal council 11 seats needed for a majority
- Turnout: 13,802 (62.3%) ▲0.4%
	First party	Second party	Third party
	A	F	Ø
Party	Social Democrats	Green Left	Red-Green Alliance
Last election	7 seats, 34.1%	4 seats, 18.2%	2 seats, 11.0%
Seats won	6	5	2
Seat change	▼1	▲1	0
Popular vote	3,804	2,642	1,571
Percentage	28.0%	19.4%	11.6%
Swing	▼6.1%	▲1.2%	▲0.5%
	Fourth party	Fifth party	Sixth party
	C	O	B
Party	Conservatives	Danish People's Party	Social Liberals
Last election	4 seats, 13.5%	1 seat, 5.2%	2 seats, 7.8%
Seats won	2	2	2
Seat change	▼2	▲1	0
Popular vote	1,395	1,182	1,070
Percentage	10.3%	8.7%	7.9%
Swing	▼3.2%	▲3.5%	▲0.1%
	Seventh party	Eighth party	Ninth party
	L	I	V
Party	Albertslund-Listen	Liberal Alliance	Venstre
Last election	Did not stand	0 seats, 0.9%	1 seat, 4.4%
Seats won	1	1	0
Seat change	▲1	▲1	▼1
Popular vote	863	533	409
Percentage	6.4%	3.9%	3.0%
Swing	New	▲3.0%	▼1.4%
Mayor before election
Steen Christiansen
Social Democrats
Mayor after election
Lars Gravgaard Hansen
Conservatives

The 2025 Albertslund Municipal election was held on November 18, 2025, to elect the 21 members to sit in the regional council for the Albertslund Municipal council, in the period of 2026 to 2029. Lars Gravgaard Hansen from the Conservatives, would win the mayoral position.

== Background ==
Following the 2021 election, Steen Christiansen from Social Democrats became mayor for his fourth term. He would run for a fifth term.

== Electoral system ==
For elections to Danish municipalities, a number varying from 9 to 31 are chosen to be elected to the municipal council. The seats are then allocated using the D'Hondt method and a closed list proportional representation. Albertslund Municipality had 21 seats in 2025.

== Electoral alliances ==
Party		Political alignment
B	Social Liberals	Centre to Centre-left
F	Green Left	Centre-left to Left-wing
L	Albertslund-Listen	Local politics
T	Grøn Velfærd	Local politics
Ø	Red-Green Alliance	Left-wing to Far-Left

Party		Political alignment
C	Conservatives	Centre-right
I	Liberal Alliance	Centre-right to Right-wing
O	Danish People's Party	Right-wing to Far-right
V	Venstre	Centre-right

== Results by polling station ==
Division	A	B	C	F	I	L	O	T	V	Ø
Division	%	%	%	%	%	%	%	%	%	%
Herstedøster Skole	21.4	6.3	14.2	20.9	4.6	5.5	7.6	1.3	3.4	14.8
Egelundskolen	28.1	6.0	13.4	19.9	4.9	5.7	9.1	0.6	3.3	9.0
Herstedlund Skole	30.9	11.4	8.1	18.0	3.3	5.7	8.7	0.8	1.6	11.6
Kongsholmcenteret	31.7	5.9	6.6	16.4	2.7	8.9	12.8	0.8	2.2	12.1
Herstedvester Skole	29.6	10.1	8.1	20.9	3.8	6.2	6.4	0.8	4.0	10.1

== Results ==
Party		Votes	%	+/-	Seats	+/-
Albertslund Municipality
A	Social Democrats	3,804	28.00	-6.07	6	-1
F	Green Left	2,642	19.45	+1.21	5	+1
Ø	Red-Green Alliance	1,571	11.56	+0.52	2	0
C	Conservatives	1,395	10.27	-3.18	2	-2
O	Danish People's Party	1,182	8.70	+3.46	2	+1
B	Social Liberals	1,070	7.88	+0.07	2	0
L	Albertslund-Listen	863	6.35	New	1	New
I	Liberal Alliance	533	3.92	+3.04	1	+1
V	Venstre	409	3.01	-1.39	0	-1
T	Grøn Velfærd	116	0.85	New	0	New
Total		13,585	100	N/A	21	N/A
Invalid votes		47	0.21	-0.15		
Blank votes		170	0.77	+0.13		
Turnout		13,802	62.30	+0.38		
Source: valg.dk

== Opinion polls ==
Polling firm	Fieldwork date	Sample size	A	F	C	Ø	B	O	V	I	L	T	Others	Lead
Epinion	4 Sep - 13 Oct 2025	501	29.2	22.8	6.1	17.4	4.0	9.1	4.0	2.7	–	–	4.7	6.4
2024 european parliament election	9 Jun 2024		20.1	23.7	6.2	15.5	6.5	7.7	6.6	3.9	–	–	–	3.6
2022 general election	1 Nov 2022		33.6	13.7	3.6	9.1	3.9	4.1	5.1	4.4	–	–	–	19.9
2021 regional election	16 Nov 2021		32.3	15.0	11.7	13.1	7.1	5.3	5.4	0.9	–	–	–	17.3
2021 municipal election	16 Nov 2021		34.1 (7)	18.2 (4)	13.5 (4)	11.0 (2)	7.8 (2)	5.2 (1)	4.4 (1)	0.9 (0)	–	–	–	15.9
