= 2025 Køge municipal election =

Municipal election in Denmark

- 18 November 2025

All 27 seats to the Køge municipal council 14 seats needed for a majority
- Turnout: 36,116 (71.4%) ▲3.0%
	First party	Second party	Third party
	V	A	C
Party	Venstre	Social Democrats	Conservatives
Last election	6 seats, 22.9%	10 seats, 31.8%	5 seats, 16.8%
Seats won	9	6	4
Seat change	▲3	▼4	▼1
Popular vote	10,016	6,617	4,291
Percentage	28.1%	18.6%	12.1%
Swing	▲5.2%	▼13.2%	▼4.7%
	Fourth party	Fifth party	Sixth party
	F	O	D
Party	Green Left	Danish People's Party	Corona Camping Listen
Last election	2 seats, 8.9%	1 seat, 3.8%	Did not stand
Seats won	3	2	1
Seat change	▲1	▲1	▲1
Popular vote	4,217	2,027	1,978
Percentage	11.8%	5.7%	5.6%
Swing	▲3.0%	▲1.9%	New
	Seventh party	Eighth party	Ninth party
	I	Ø	B
Party	Liberal Alliance	Red-Green Alliance	Social Liberals
Last election	0 seats, 1.1%	1 seat, 4.3%	1 seat, 5.6%
Seats won	1	1	0
Seat change	▲1	0	▼1
Popular vote	1,891	1,260	979
Percentage	5.3%	3.5%	2.8%
Swing	▲4.2%	▼0.8%	▼2.9%
Mayor before election
Marie Stærke
Social Democrats
Mayor after election
Ken Kristensen
Venstre

The 2025 Køge Municipal election was held on November 18, 2025, to elect the 27 members to sit in the regional council for the Køge Municipal council, in the period of 2026 to 2029. Ken Kristensen from Venstre, would win the mayoral position.

== Background ==
Following the 2021 election, Marie Stærke from Social Democrats became mayor for her second term. She would for a third term.

== Electoral system ==
For elections to Danish municipalities, a number varying from 9 to 31 are chosen to be elected to the municipal council. The seats are then allocated using the D'Hondt method and a closed list proportional representation. Køge Municipality had 27 seats in 2025.

== Electoral alliances ==
=== Electoral Alliance 1 ===
Party		Political alignment
A	Social Democrats	Centre-left
B	Social Liberals	Centre to Centre-left
F	Green Left	Centre-left to Left-wing
Ø	Red-Green Alliance	Left-wing to Far-Left
Å	The Alternative	Centre-left to Left-wing

=== Electoral Alliance 2 ===
Party		Political alignment
C	Conservatives	Centre-right
D	Corona Camping Listen	Local politics
I	Liberal Alliance	Centre-right to Right-wing
K	Christian Democrats	Centre to Centre-right
L	Borgernes Lokalliste Køge	Local politics
M	Moderates	Centre to Centre-right
O	Danish People's Party	Right-wing to Far-right
V	Venstre	Centre-right
Æ	Denmark Democrats	Right-wing to Far-right

== Results by polling station ==
Division	A	B	C	D	F	I	K	L	M	O	V	Æ	Ø	Å
Division	%	%	%	%	%	%	%	%	%	%	%	%	%	%
Køge By	21.3	3.6	17.0	3.6	11.4	4.8	0.9	0.4	0.8	4.2	26.8	1.5	3.2	0.4
Køge By - Vest	24.7	3.1	15.7	4.7	12.2	3.3	1.0	0.5	1.5	5.2	20.8	2.0	5.0	0.3
Ølby	21.7	4.6	12.1	5.4	11.9	5.5	1.1	0.7	1.3	7.4	21.0	2.8	4.0	0.5
Ølsemagle	20.2	3.1	11.9	3.3	11.5	15.7	1.1	0.7	1.0	5.6	19.9	1.9	4.0	0.1
Hastrup	24.2	1.9	13.2	4.7	15.2	3.1	1.4	0.4	2.2	5.4	22.6	1.9	3.6	0.2
Herfølge	18.3	1.7	9.4	4.6	14.8	5.4	4.5	0.9	1.6	6.7	23.1	3.2	5.3	0.5
Ejbyhallen (Køge)	13.4	2.4	7.1	6.6	10.0	4.8	0.5	1.0	0.7	6.2	40.7	3.7	2.6	0.4
Vemmedrup	7.9	1.1	9.8	4.7	4.0	2.8	1.2	6.5	0.6	3.9	53.9	2.7	0.9	0.1
Bjæverskov	9.9	0.9	7.0	5.0	4.7	3.2	1.4	1.6	0.4	6.9	53.7	4.2	1.1	0.1
Gørslev	10.1	0.7	6.3	10.9	6.4	5.6	2.0	0.9	1.1	9.2	38.2	5.6	2.7	0.3
Borup	13.7	3.1	10.1	12.7	15.7	4.6	0.6	2.3	0.5	5.3	25.7	2.0	3.3	0.4

== Results ==
Party		Votes	%	+/-	Seats	+/-
Køge Municipality
V	Venstre	10,016	28.14	+5.20	9	+3
A	Social Democrats	6,617	18.59	-13.17	6	-4
C	Conservatives	4,291	12.06	-4.72	4	-1
F	Green Left	4,217	11.85	+2.99	3	+1
O	Danish People's Party	2,027	5.69	+1.85	2	+1
D	Corona Camping Listen	1,978	5.56	New	1	New
I	Liberal Alliance	1,891	5.31	+4.23	1	+1
Ø	Red-Green Alliance	1,260	3.54	-0.80	1	0
B	Social Liberals	979	2.75	-2.86	0	-1
Æ	Denmark Democrats	889	2.50	New	0	New
K	Christian Democrats	515	1.45	+1.21	0	0
L	Borgernes Lokalliste Køge	398	1.12	New	0	New
M	Moderates	393	1.10	New	0	New
Å	The Alternative	124	0.35	-0.24	0	0
Total		35,595	100	N/A	27	N/A
Invalid votes		101	0.20	-0.05		
Blank votes		420	0.83	-0.04		
Turnout		36,116	71.44	+3.02		
Source: valg.dk

== Opinion polls ==
Polling firm	Fieldwork date	Sample size	A	V	C	F	B	Ø	O	I	Å	K	D	L	M	Æ	Others	Lead
Epinion	4 Sep - 13 Oct 2025	518	19.3	27.4	7.3	13.5	2.9	5.5	8.2	6.3	1.9	–	–	–	0.9	4.7	2.2	8.1
2024 european parliament election	9 Jun 2024		15.1	14.9	9.1	18.5	6.3	5.5	8.0	7.1	2.0	–	–	–	7.5	6.1	–	3.4
2022 general election	1 Nov 2022		25.3	14.1	5.2	14.3	2.4	2.5	3.4	7.7	1.7	0.2	–	–	11.5	7.1	–	11.0
2021 regional election	16 Nov 2021		30.2	20.4	18.9	9.3	4.1	4.7	4.7	1.5	0.4	0.5	–	–	–	–	–	9.8
2021 municipal election	16 Nov 2021		31.8 (10)	22.9 (6)	16.8 (5)	8.9 (2)	5.6 (1)	4.3 (1)	3.8 (1)	1.1 (0)	0.6 (0)	0.2 (0)	–	–	–	–	–	8.9
