= 2025 Dragør municipal election =

Local election in Denmark

- 18 November 2025

All 15 seats to the Dragør municipal council 8 seats needed for a majority
- Turnout: 8,568 (77.3%) ▲1.4%
	First party	Second party	Third party
	C	T	A
Party	Conservatives	Tværpolitisk Forening	Social Democrats
Last election	6 seats, 34.3%	3 seats, 18.5%	3 seats, 14.8%
Seats won	8	2	2
Seat change	▲2	▼1	▼1
Popular vote	3,716	1,424	1,041
Percentage	43.8%	16.8%	12.3%
Swing	▲9.6%	▼1.7%	▼2.6%
	Fourth party	Fifth party	Sixth party
	V	F	L
Party	Venstre	Green Left	Sydamagerlisten
Last election	2 seats, 12.1%	0 seats, 3.7%	1 seat, 6.3%
Seats won	2	1	0
Seat change	0	▲1	▼1
Popular vote	580	408	316
Percentage	6.8%	4.8%	3.7%
Swing	▼5.2%	▲1.1%	▼2.6%
Mayor before election
Kenneth Gøtterup
Conservatives
Mayor after election
Kenneth Gøtterup
Conservatives

The 2025 Dragør Municipal election was held on November 18, 2025, to elect the 15 members to sit in the regional council for the Dragør Municipal council, in the period of 2026 to 2029. Kenneth Gøtterup from the Conservatives, would secure re-election.

== Background ==
Following the 2021 election, Kenneth Gøtterup from Conservatives became mayor for his first term. He will run for a second term.

== Electoral system ==
For elections to Danish municipalities, a number varying from 9 to 31 are chosen to be elected to the municipal council. The seats are then allocated using the D'Hondt method and a closed list proportional representation. Dragør Municipality had 15 seats in 2025.

== Electoral alliances ==
=== Electoral Alliance 1 ===
Party		Political alignment
A	Social Democrats	Centre-left
F	Green Left	Centre-left to Left-wing

=== Electoral Alliance 2 ===
Party		Political alignment
B	Social Liberals	Centre to Centre-left
G	Anne Grønlund	Local politics
I	Liberal Alliance	Centre-right to Right-wing
M	Moderates	Centre to Centre-right
V	Venstre	Centre-right

=== Electoral Alliance 3 ===
Party		Political alignment
C	Conservatives	Centre-right
O	Danish People's Party	Right-wing to Far-right
Æ	Denmark Democrats	Right-wing to Far-right

== Results by polling station ==
Division	A	B	C	F	G	I	L	M	O	T	V	Æ
Division	%	%	%	%	%	%	%	%	%	%	%	%
Dragør Skole	10.7	2.2	45.2	4.2	0.2	2.8	3.2	1.7	3.0	19.9	6.4	0.5
Hollænderhallen	13.3	3.0	43.0	5.2	0.3	3.4	4.1	1.3	3.7	14.8	7.1	0.9

== Results ==
Party		Votes	%	+/-	Seats	+/-
Dragør Municipality
C	Conservatives	3,716	43.85	+9.58	8	+2
T	Tværpolitisk Forening	1,424	16.80	-1.72	2	-1
A	Social Democrats	1,041	12.28	-2.55	2	-1
V	Venstre	580	6.84	-5.21	2	0
F	Green Left	408	4.81	+1.08	1	+1
L	Sydamagerlisten	316	3.73	-2.58	0	-1
O	Danish People's Party	292	3.45	+0.19	0	0
I	Liberal Alliance	266	3.14	+2.52	0	0
B	Social Liberals	227	2.68	-1.44	0	0
M	Moderates	122	1.44	New	0	New
Æ	Denmark Democrats	63	0.74	New	0	New
G	Anne Grønlund	20	0.24	0.0	0	0
Total		8,475	100	N/A	15	N/A
Invalid votes		19	0.17	-0.02		
Blank votes		74	0.67	-0.02		
Turnout		8,568	77.34	+1.43		
Source: valg.dk

== Opinion polls ==
Polling firm	Fieldwork date	Sample size	C	T	A	V	L	B	F	O	I	G	M	Æ	Others	Lead
Epinion	4 Sep - 13 Oct 2025	303	46.9	–	13.6	8.8	–	4.4	7.4	3.7	2.6	–	2.1	2.5	7.9	33.3
2024 european parliament election	9 Jun 2024		13.6	–	13.5	15.8	–	8.2	15.0	5.9	9.2	–	9.8	3.7	–	0.8
2022 general election	1 Nov 2022		11.6	–	23.5	13.4	–	3.5	7.0	2.8	10.5	–	14.0	4.6	–	9.5
2021 regional election	16 Nov 2021		32.0	–	20.5	16.5	–	7.7	6.2	4.1	1.7	–	–	–	–	11.5
2021 municipal election	16 Nov 2021		34.3 (6)	18.5 (3)	14.8 (3)	12.1 (2)	6.3 (1)	4.1 (0)	3.7 (0)	3.3 (0)	0.6 (0)	0.2 (0)	–	–	–	15.8
