= Danish Institute for Parties and Democracy =

Danish Institute for Parties and Democracy (DIPD) was established by the Danish Parliament in May 2010. Its overall purpose is to strengthen and complement the Danish democracy assistance, particularly through support to political parties and multi-party platforms in developing countries.

== Projects ==
Danish Institute for Parties and Democracy provides democracy assistance through partnership-based projects in Africa, Asia, Latin America and the Middle East. The institute works to develop and further democratic institutions in political systems and civil society focusing on media, young people, elections, gender and human rights. DIPD seek to bring together individuals, groups and political parties to share ideas, knowledge and experiences and support projects that strengthen a democratic culture.

== Management ==
The board is the supreme decision-making body of DIPD. Of the 15 members, 9 are appointed by the Danish Parliament, 2 by The Danish Youth Council, and finally the Minister for Development Cooperation, Rektorkollegiet, NGO FORUM and the Danish Centre for International Studies and Human Rights appoint one member each. Amongst its members, the board selects a chairman. The members are appointed for a four-year period with the possibility of re-election. The daily management of the institute is carried out by a director appointed by the board. The current director is Bjørn Førde.
