= Niverød =

- Town
- Location in Denmark Niverød (Capital Region)
- Coordinates: 55°56′14″N 12°29′55″E
- Country: Denmark
- Region: Region Hovedstaden
- Municipality: Fredensborg

Population (1 January 2007)
  - Total: 7,797(including Nivå)
- Time zone: UTC+1 (CET)
  - Summer (DST): UTC+2 (CEST)

Niverød is a town in the Danish Capital Region (Hovedstaden), located in Fredensborg Municipality on the island of Zealand. Together with Nivå, it had a population of 7,797 (2007). The town is now effectively merged into the urban area of Nivå.

== See also ==
- Karlebo Parish (which includes Niverød)
