= Bo Libergren =

Danish politician

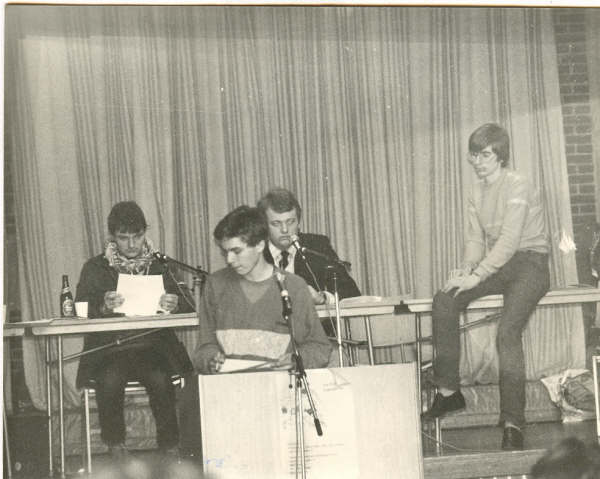
Bo Libergren (on the speaker's platform) was elected as president of The National Union of Danish School Pupils in 1984.

Bo Libergren (born April 29, 1969) is a Danish politician, representing the conservative-liberal party Venstre who in November 2023 was elected as chairman of the regional council of the Region of Southern Denmark, having previously been serving as acting chairman in the same capacity from March until August 2023.

He was elected to the county council of Funen County in 1994 and returned in 1998 and 2001. From 2001 to 2006 he served as chairman of the county's newly created committee of disease prevention. In the Danish municipal elections on 15 November 2005 he stood for the new regional council of the Region of Southern Denmark and was elected, more than tripling his number of votes from the election in 2001. He has been reelected in every election since then.

Between 2014 and 2017 Libergren also represented Venstre in the city council of the Municipality of Odense.

He was a candidate in the 2019 Danish general election but failed to be elected to the Danish Folketing.

Bo Libergren is a historian by profession. He has served in several other capacities, including national treasurer of Venstres Ungdom in the early 1990s and president of the National Union of Danish School Pupils (Danish: Folkeskoleelevernes Landsorganisation (FLO)) in 1984–1986.
