= Marianne Bredal =

Danish politician (born 1985)

Mayor of Struer Municipality
- Incumbent
- Assumed office 1 February 2024
- Preceded by: Mads Jakobsen

Member of the Folketing
- In office 3 October 2017 – 15 March 2018
- Constituency: West Jutland

Personal details
- Born: 10 May 1985 (age 41) Holstebro, Denmark
- Party: Venstre

Marianne Bredal (born 10 May 1985) is a Danish politician. She is the mayor of the Struer Municipality in Mid Jutland Region since 1 February 2024 following the resignation of Mads Jakobsen, elected for Venstre.

== Political career ==
Marianne has been a member of Struer City Council for the conservative-liberal party Venstre since 2013, and for several years was also a parliamentary candidate for the party. In 2015 Marianne Bredal, had decided not to stand again for the Folketing. She also ran in the 2007 Danish general election and 2011 Danish general election, where she was also not elected as a member. She said "I decided a long time ago that if it didn't work out this time, it was over. Now I've given it two tries, and I think new forces are needed in the Holstebro circle."

She was then temporary a Member of Parliament from October 2017 to March 2018 in Thomas Danielsen's absence. She took over as acting mayor in 2023, when Mads Jakobsen became ill and took over the post of mayor when he resigned from the city council. She thus becomes the first female mayor in Struer. She now holds the post of mayor for the next two years.

From 2015, she has been the owner of Humlum.
