= 2025 Furesø municipal election =

Municipal election in Denmark

- 18 November 2025

All 21 seats to the Furesø municipal council 11 seats needed for a majority
- Turnout: 24,701 (76.7%) ▲2.6%
	First party	Second party	Third party
	A	C	V
Party	Social Democrats	Conservatives	Venstre
Last election	8 seats, 36.4%	5 seats, 24.0%	3 seats, 11.3%
Seats won	6	5	3
Seat change	▼2	0	0
Popular vote	5,796	5,670	3,551
Percentage	23.8%	23.3%	14.6%
Swing	▼12.6%	▼0.7%	▲3.3%
	Fourth party	Fifth party	Sixth party
	B	Ø	F
Party	Social Liberals	Red-Green Alliance	Green Left
Last election	2 seats, 9.3%	2 seats, 6.6%	1 seat, 4.7%
Seats won	3	1	1
Seat change	▲1	▼1	0
Popular vote	3,018	1,858	1,683
Percentage	12.4%	7.6%	6.9%
Swing	▲3.1%	▲1.1%	▲2.2%
	Seventh party	Eighth party
	I	O
Party	Liberal Alliance	Danish People's Party
Last election	0 seats, 2.2%	0 seats, 1.2%
Seats won	1	1
Seat change	▲1	▲1
Popular vote	1,078	757
Percentage	4.4%	3.1%
Swing	▲2.3%	▲1.9%
Mayor before election
Ole Bondo Christensen
Social Democrats
Mayor after election
Nicolai Bechfeldt
Venstre

The 2025 Furesø Municipal election was held on November 18, 2025, to elect the 21 members to sit in the regional council for the Furesø Municipal council, in the period of 2026 to 2029. Nicolai Bechfeldt from Venstre, would win the mayoral position.

== Background ==
Following the 2021 election, Ole Bondo Christensen from Social Democrats became mayor for a fourth term. He would run for a fifth term.

== Electoral system ==
For elections to Danish municipalities, a number varying from 9 to 31 are chosen to be elected to the municipal council. The seats are then allocated using the D'Hondt method and a closed list proportional representation. Furesø Municipality had 21 seats in 2025.

== Electoral alliances ==
=== Electoral Alliance 1 ===
Party		Political alignment
A	Social Democrats	Centre-left
F	Green Left	Centre-left to Left-wing

=== Electoral Alliance 2 ===
Party		Political alignment
B	Social Liberals	Centre to Centre-left
Ø	Red-Green Alliance	Left-wing to Far-Left
Å	The Alternative	Centre-left to Left-wing

=== Electoral Alliance 3 ===
Party		Political alignment
C	Conservatives	Centre-right
L	Lokallisten Bedre Borgerinddragelse	Local politics
V	Venstre	Centre-right

=== Electoral Alliance 4 ===
Party		Political alignment
E	Furesørødderne	Local politics
I	Liberal Alliance	Centre-right to Right-wing
M	Moderates	Centre to Centre-right
O	Danish People's Party	Right-wing to Far-right

== Results by polling station ==
Division	A	B	C	E	F	I	L	M	O	V	Ø	Å
Division	%	%	%	%	%	%	%	%	%	%	%	%
Værløse	24.4	11.9	25.0	1.1	6.3	4.1	0.4	0.5	4.1	14.9	6.4	0.8
Hareskov	16.5	13.1	29.5	0.4	6.3	3.7	0.1	0.6	1.5	20.6	6.5	1.2
Søndersøhallen	21.9	13.6	21.2	0.9	7.0	4.4	0.3	0.3	2.1	21.4	6.2	0.6
Jonstrup	30.0	21.7	12.4	0.8	7.4	2.9	0.1	0.5	2.3	11.9	8.9	1.1
Stavnsholt	25.3	10.9	27.2	2.4	6.3	5.2	0.1	0.6	2.6	11.4	6.9	1.0
Solvang	22.1	13.0	22.0	3.6	7.4	5.6	0.2	0.7	2.4	13.9	8.3	0.8
Paltholm	29.3	6.9	20.5	2.5	8.2	3.3	0.8	1.7	6.1	7.1	12.0	1.5

== Results ==
Party		Votes	%	+/-	Seats	+/-
Furesø Municipality
A	Social Democrats	5,796	23.82	-12.63	6	-2
C	Conservatives	5,670	23.30	-0.68	5	0
V	Venstre	3,551	14.59	+3.30	3	0
B	Social Liberals	3,018	12.40	+3.10	3	+1
Ø	Red-Green Alliance	1,858	7.63	+1.06	1	-1
F	Green Left	1,683	6.92	+2.17	1	0
I	Liberal Alliance	1,078	4.43	+2.25	1	+1
O	Danish People's Party	757	3.11	+1.89	1	+1
E	Furesørødderne	456	1.87	New	0	New
Å	The Alternative	229	0.94	-0.60	0	0
M	Moderates	165	0.68	New	0	New
L	Lokallisten Bedre Borgerinddragelse	75	0.31	New	0	New
Total		24,336	100	N/A	21	N/A
Invalid votes		94	0.29	+0.10		
Blank votes		271	0.84	+0.31		
Turnout		24,701	76.74	+2.63		
Source: valg.dk

== Opinion polls ==
Polling firm	Fieldwork date	Sample size	A	C	V	B	Ø	F	I	Å	O	E	L	M	Others	Lead
Epinion	4 Sep - 13 Oct 2025	495	29.1	16.4	11.7	7.5	7.6	13.7	5.7	0.8	5.6	–	–	1.3	0.7	12.7
2024 european parliament election	9 Jun 2024		12.6	12.2	14.1	11.6	6.0	20.9	7.1	2.2	3.9	–	–	7.7	–	6.8
2022 general election	1 Nov 2022		23.8	8.3	14.2	7.7	5.5	9.1	8.8	4.0	1.8	–	–	11.5	–	9.6
2021 regional election	16 Nov 2021		24.9	26.2	11.2	12.4	7.4	7.3	3.1	0.9	1.8	–	–	–	–	1.3
2021 municipal election	16 Nov 2021		36.4 (8)	24.0 (5)	11.3 (3)	9.3 (2)	6.6 (2)	4.7 (1)	2.2 (0)	1.5 (0)	1.2 (0)	–	–	–	–	12.4
