= Denmark Democrats =

Denmark Democrats – Inger Støjberg Danmarksdemokraterne – Inger Støjberg
- Abbreviation: DD; Æ (Note: Official party letter on voting ballot)
- Chairperson: Inger Støjberg
- Parliamentary leader: Jens Henrik Thulesen Dahl
- Founder: Inger Støjberg
- Founded: 23 June 2022; 4 years ago
- Split from: Venstre; Danish People's Party
- Ideology: National conservatism Right-wing populism
- Political position: Right-wing to far-right
- European affiliation: European Conservatives and Reformists Party
- European Parliament group: European Conservatives and Reformists Group
- Nordic affiliation: Blue Nordic
- Colours: Red Blue
- Folketing: 10 / 179 (Note: Only 175 of the 179 seats in the Danish Parliament, the Folketing, are obtainable by Danish political parties as Greenland and the Faroe Islands are assigned two seats each due to their status as territories in the Kingdom of Denmark.)
- European Parliament: 1 / 15
- Municipal councils: 121 / 2,436
- Regions: 7 / 134

Election symbol
- Æ

Website
- danmarksdemokraterne.dk

The Denmark Democrats (Danish: Danmarksdemokraterne [ˈtænmɑɡ̊sde̝moˌkʰʁɑˀtɐnə], DD) is a conservative and right-wing populist political party in Denmark. The party was founded in June 2022 by Inger Støjberg, and is officially titled Denmark Democrats – Inger Støjberg (Danmarksdemokraterne – Inger Støjberg). The party is currently in opposition to the third Frederiksen government.

== History ==
The party was founded in June 2022 by Inger Støjberg who had served variously as the minister for immigration, housing and gender equality in the Folketing for the Venstre party before she was impeached for misconduct in office after separating families in migrant centres and was accused of party disloyalty. According to Støjberg, her new movement would be a right-wing party with a strict immigration policy, but at the time of its founding there was no actual party platform. In July, the party was formally registered after obtaining the necessary voter declarations on 1 July, eight days after the party was founded.

That same month, Members of the Folketing Peter Skaarup, Jens Henrik Thulesen Dahl, Bent Bøgsted, and Hans Kristian Skibby announced that they wished to join the Denmark Democrats. These four were originally elected to the Folketing for the Danish People's Party (DPP) but had since become independents before joining the party. Skaarup was admitted as a member on 28 July 2022, giving the party its first seat in the Folketing.

In August 2022, nine local councilors defected to the party, including former local members of the Conservative People's Party (DKF/K).

=== Name and comparison with the Sweden Democrats ===
The party's name was inspired by the Swedish right-wing party Sweden Democrats (SD). When asked at the party's launch whether Danmarksdemokraterne would be a Danish version of the Sweden Democrats, Støjberg said she was not familiar with the details of the Swedish party's programme and described Danmarksdemokraterne as a Danish party. She said the name reflected her own political views and that the party aimed to focus on areas outside Copenhagen.

=== First general election ===
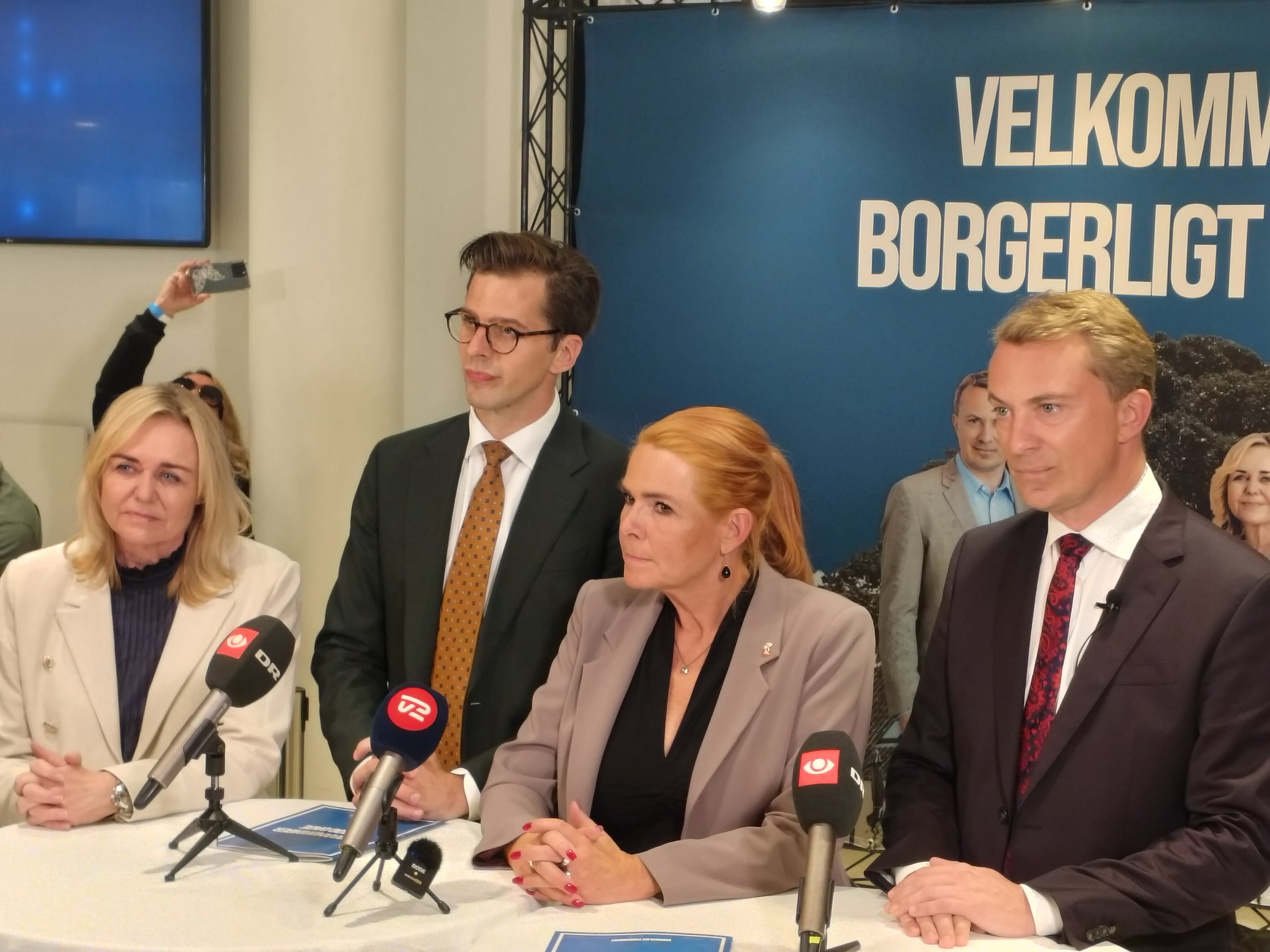
Støjberg at a 2025 press conference with leaders of other right-wing parties: Mona Juul, Alex Vanopslagh and Morten Messerschmidt

In the 2022 Danish general election held on 1 November 2022, the party won 8.1% of the vote and 14 seats, making them the fifth largest party in the Folketing along with the Liberal Alliance.

== Ideology and platform ==
The party is positioned on the right-wing to far-right of the political spectrum. Danish Institute for Parties and Democracy branded the party as "a conservative party with a strict immigration policy and a focus on the balance between rural and urban areas as its primary key issues." Journalist Theodoros Benakis described it as right-wing populist and anti-immigration. In foreign policy, it has supported Ukraine against Russia, with Støjberg visiting Kyiv together with Defense Minister Troels Lund Poulsen and voting with the government for establishing a Ukraine Fund.

In the interview in which party founder Støjberg announced her leadership of the party, she stated: "I think that what is missing is a borgerlig [bourgeois or middle-class] party that takes care of the interests of the majority of people. And that has a clear view of everything that goes on outside of Copenhagen. I think that the connecting lines between Copenhagen and the rest of Denmark are becoming weak." She also stated one of the main focuses of the party would be to review Denmark's immigration policy.

On its website and early policy brief, the party seeks to improve conditions for the elderly, young people, and small and medium-sized companies. It also aims to combat what it describes as overbearing bureaucracy from the European Union (EU) on Denmark and wants to further decentralize power to regions outside of the capital. It also wants to increase funding for the police and calls for compulsory policies for immigrants to adapt to Danish culture. In an updated policy platform, the Denmark Democrats stated its objectives to be removing all EU influence on Danish pension, tax and maternity leave policies, tougher regulation on car leasing companies, tax deductions for workers who commute above certain distances, removing VAT on energy bills, changes to the Danish education system to encourage more vocational training, and reforms and cuts to Denmark's foreign aid and government funded arts budgets.

== Election results ==
=== Parliament ===
Election	Leader	Votes	%	Seats	+/-	Government
2022	Inger Støjberg	286,796	8.12 (#5)	14 / 179	New	Opposition
2026	Inger Støjberg	205,302	5.75 (#10)	10 / 179	▼4	Opposition

=== European Parliament ===
Year	List leader	Votes	%	Seats	+/–	EP Group
2024	Kristoffer Hjort Storm	180,836	7.39 (#5)	1 / 15	New	ECR
