= 2025 Vejen municipal election =

Municipal election in Denmark

- 18 November 2025

All 27 seats to the Vejen municipal council 14 seats needed for a majority
- Turnout: 22,721 (67.9%) ▼0.4%
	First party	Second party	Third party
	V	C	A
Party	Venstre	Conservatives	Social Democrats
Last election	9 seats, 30.8%	6 seats, 23.3%	8 seats, 28.1%
Seats won	10	5	5
Seat change	▲1	▼1	▼3
Popular vote	7,923	4,176	4,172
Percentage	35.5%	18.7%	18.7%
Swing	▲4.8%	▼4.6%	▼9.4%
	Fourth party	Fifth party	Sixth party
	O	F	Æ
Party	Danish People's Party	Green Left	Denmark Democrats
Last election	1 seat, 3.3%	1 seat, 3.4%	Did not stand
Seats won	2	2	2
Seat change	▲1	▲1	▲2
Popular vote	1,551	1,474	1,446
Percentage	7.0%	6.6%	6.5%
Swing	▲3.7%	▲3.2%	New
	Seventh party
	I
Party	Liberal Alliance
Last election	0 seats, 0.3%
Seats won	1
Seat change	▲1
Popular vote	706
Percentage	3.2%
Swing	▲2.8%
Mayor before election
Frank Schmidt-Hansen
Conservatives
Mayor after election
Christian Lund
Venstre

The 2025 Vejen Municipal election was held on November 18, 2025, to elect the 27 members to sit in the regional council for the Vejen Municipal council, in the period of 2026 to 2029. Christian Lund from Venstre, would win the mayoral position.

== Background ==
Following the 2021 election, Frank Schmidt-Hansen from the Conservatives became mayor for his first term. Schmidt Jensen would to be re-elected for a second term.

== Electoral system ==
For elections to Danish municipalities, a number varying from 9 to 31 are chosen to be elected to the municipal council. The seats are then allocated using the D'Hondt method and a closed list proportional representation. Vejen Municipality had 27 seats in 2025.

== Electoral alliances ==
=== Electoral Alliance 1 ===
Party		Political alignment
A	Social Democrats	Centre-left
F	Green Left	Centre-left to Left-wing
M	Moderates	Centre to Centre-right
Å	The Alternative	Centre-left to Left-wing

=== Electoral Alliance 2 ===
Party		Political alignment
B	Social Liberals	Centre to Centre-left
O	Danish People's Party	Right-wing to Far-right
V	Venstre	Centre-right

=== Electoral Alliance 3 ===
Party		Political alignment
C	Conservatives	Centre-right
I	Liberal Alliance	Centre-right to Right-wing
Æ	Denmark Democrats	Right-wing to Far-right

== Results by polling station ==
Division	A	B	C	F	I	M	O	V	Æ	Å
Division	%	%	%	%	%	%	%	%	%	%
Brørup	27.0	1.0	18.0	5.5	3.1	1.8	6.4	29.6	7.5	0.2
Lindknud	10.9	0.2	12.5	6.7	4.2	2.8	5.6	46.1	9.5	1.6
Holsted	21.7	4.6	18.7	4.4	3.7	3.1	6.8	27.2	8.5	1.2
Føvling	20.4	0.7	9.9	3.7	4.2	15.0	9.3	26.1	10.1	0.5
Glejbjerg	8.7	0.6	7.3	4.3	3.3	2.0	6.5	55.8	10.5	0.9
Hovborg	14.6	1.4	16.9	10.8	3.1	4.1	7.8	34.6	6.1	0.7
Rødding Centret	9.1	0.7	44.9	6.2	1.7	1.2	6.6	25.3	4.0	0.3
Sdr. Hygum	9.8	0.2	21.6	7.1	1.2	0.2	6.3	48.4	4.9	0.2
Jels	23.7	0.6	12.4	3.9	2.5	1.7	5.3	45.5	4.2	0.3
Lintrup	7.3	0.0	37.8	2.2	2.4	1.4	7.8	33.0	7.8	0.3
Skodborg	17.5	0.1	11.1	4.0	3.0	1.3	6.1	53.3	3.4	0.1
Københoved	6.7	0.4	18.0	7.0	2.1	0.7	6.3	51.8	7.0	0.0
Øster Lindet	12.5	0.0	24.0	6.8	4.4	0.8	8.6	36.6	6.0	0.3
Vejen Idrætscenter	22.0	1.5	15.7	9.6	2.7	1.6	7.1	32.9	6.2	0.6
Læborg	11.4	0.3	15.8	6.7	4.9	2.6	10.6	42.1	5.2	0.5
Askov-Malt	17.1	0.7	22.1	7.6	3.2	1.8	4.7	39.1	3.2	0.5
Andst	11.7	0.3	17.9	9.5	4.2	1.1	12.1	34.3	8.3	0.8
Gesten	16.5	0.5	7.4	8.5	4.0	2.8	9.0	40.3	9.9	1.1
Bække	22.7	0.9	12.3	3.9	6.5	1.1	9.2	32.4	10.4	0.5

== Results ==
Party		Votes	%	+/-	Seats	+/-
Vejen Municipality
V	Venstre	7,923	35.54	+4.79	10	+1
C	Conservatives	4,176	18.73	-4.61	5	-1
A	Social Democrats	4,172	18.71	-9.37	5	-3
O	Danish People's Party	1,551	6.96	+3.65	2	+1
F	Green Left	1,474	6.61	+3.16	2	+1
Æ	Denmark Democrats	1,446	6.49	New	2	New
I	Liberal Alliance	706	3.17	+2.83	1	+1
M	Moderates	471	2.11	New	0	New
B	Social Liberals	252	1.13	-0.62	0	0
Å	The Alternative	124	0.56	New	0	New
Total		22,295	100	N/A	27	N/A
Invalid votes		85	0.25	-0.08		
Blank votes		341	1.02	+0.14		
Turnout		22,721	67.85	-0.44		
Source: valg.dk

== Opinion polls ==
Polling firm	Fieldwork date	Sample size	V	A	C	F	O	B	I	M	Å	Æ	Lead
Epinion	4 Sep - 13 Oct 2025	506	28.8	22.3	13.5	8.5	5.0	1.3	4.7	1.9	0.6	13.3	6.5
2024 european parliament election	9 Jun 2024		28.0	14.3	8.2	9.5	8.3	3.4	7.8	4.2	1.3	12.8	13.7
2022 general election	1 Nov 2022		19.7	25.2	4.9	4.8	3.1	1.6	7.7	8.3	1.0	13.1	5.5
2021 regional election	16 Nov 2021		47.7	20.7	9.7	4.2	4.1	1.9	0.7	–	0.2	–	27.0
2021 municipal election	16 Nov 2021		30.8 (9)	28.1 (8)	23.3 (6)	3.4 (1)	3.3 (1)	1.8 (0)	0.3 (0)	–	–	–	2.7
