= 2021 Vejen municipal election =

- 16 November 2021

All 27 seats to the Vejen Municipal Council 14 seats needed for a majority
- Turnout: 22,809 (68.3%) ▼3.6pp
	First party	Second party	Third party
	V	A	C
Party	Venstre	Social Democrats	Conservatives
Last election	10 seats, 35.5%	8 seats, 28.3%	4 seats, 13.8%
Seats won	9	8	6
Seat change	▼1	0	▲2
Popular vote	6,888	6,290	5,229
Percentage	30.8%	28.1%	23.3%
Swing	▼4.7%	▼0.2%	▲9.5%
	Fourth party	Fifth party	Sixth party
	D	F	O
Party	New Right	Green Left	Danish People's Party
Last election	0 seats, 1.4%	1 seat, 2.9%	2 seats, 9.6%
Seats won	1	1	1
Seat change	▲1	0	▼1
Popular vote	1,019	772	740
Percentage	4.6%	3.4%	3.3%
Swing	▲3.2%	▲0.5%	▼6.3%
	Seventh party	Eighth party	Ninth party
	L	Ø	I
Party	Liberal Borgerliste	Red–Green Alliance	Liberal Alliance
Last election	0 seats, 0%	1 seat, 4.1%	1 seat, 3.2%
Seats won	1	0	0
Seat change	▲1	▼1	▼1
Popular vote	588	407	75
Percentage	2.6%	1.8%	0.3%
Swing	▲2.6%	▼2.3%	▼2.9%
Mayor before election
Egon Fræhr
Venstre
Mayor after election
Frank Schmidt-Hansen
Conservatives

Ever since the 2007 municipal reform, Egon Fræhr from Venstre had been mayor of Vejen Municipality. He announced in 2020 that he would not stand for re-election.

Instead Morten Thorøe would be the candidate from Venstre for this election.

Venstre would lose a seat in this election, although still remaining the largest party. However following election night, an utraditional agreement between the Social Democrats and the Conservatives, would see Frank Schmidt-Hansen from the Conservatives become mayor.

This would mark the first time since the 2007 municipal reform, that a municipality in the South Jutland constituency would have a mayor from the Conservatives. It was one of three municipalities in the constituency where the Conservatives had mayor's elected in the 2021, and it was seen as a big success for the Conservatives, who had have trouble winning mayor positions outside Greater Copenhagen and North Zealand in recent elections.

== Electoral system ==
For elections to Danish municipalities, a number varying from 9 to 31 are chosen to be elected to the municipal council. The seats are then allocated using the D'Hondt method and a closed list proportional representation. Vejen Municipality had 27 seats in 2021

Unlike in Danish General Elections, in elections to municipal councils, electoral alliances are allowed.

== Electoral alliances ==
=== Electoral Alliance 1 ===
Party		Political alignment
C	Conservatives	Centre-right
I	Liberal Alliance	Centre-right to Right-wing

=== Electoral Alliance 2 ===
Party		Political alignment
F	Green Left	Centre-left to Left-wing
Ø	Red–Green Alliance	Left-wing to Far-Left

=== Electoral Alliance 3 ===
Party		Political alignment
D	New Right	Right-wing to Far-right
L	Liberal Borgerliste	Local politics

=== Electoral Alliance 4 ===
Party		Political alignment
B	Social Liberals	Centre to Centre-left
O	Danish People's Party	Right-wing to Far-right
V	Venstre	Centre-right

== Results by polling station ==
Division	A	B	C	D	F	I	L	O	V	Ø
Division	%	%	%	%	%	%	%	%	%	%
Brørup	35.4	1.0	20.6	3.2	3.8	0.3	2.2	3.1	29.0	1.4
Lindknud	21.8	0.9	15.9	6.1	3.9	0.2	3.1	4.6	43.2	0.2
Holsted	31.5	9.4	13.7	5.1	3.0	0.2	3.6	4.4	27.4	1.7
Føvling	22.6	2.2	11.8	7.1	2.8	0.2	2.9	4.8	44.7	1.1
Sdr. Hygum	33.6	0.0	26.6	5.9	2.1	0.0	2.3	2.1	25.0	2.5
Rødding	14.2	0.9	57.0	2.8	2.3	0.2	1.5	1.8	17.6	1.7
Hovborg	24.3	1.9	18.5	4.2	5.4	0.0	5.4	2.6	36.7	1.0
Glejbjerg	14.4	1.9	10.6	3.9	2.9	0.1	1.3	3.9	60.3	0.6
Jels	25.1	1.0	16.1	3.8	2.8	0.2	2.1	2.6	45.1	1.2
Lintrup	9.3	0.8	57.3	5.3	1.1	0.0	1.3	1.3	22.3	1.3
Skodborg	25.5	0.6	13.9	6.7	2.1	0.4	4.0	4.8	40.3	1.7
Københoved	10.2	0.4	17.5	2.6	2.6	0.0	17.9	1.8	44.5	2.6
Askov-Malt	25.5	0.9	27.2	4.6	3.7	0.6	3.2	2.1	30.6	1.7
Læborg	20.8	1.3	21.6	5.0	4.8	0.5	3.0	4.5	37.8	0.8
Vejen	36.4	1.3	19.9	3.7	4.1	0.3	1.9	3.1	26.2	3.2
Øster Lindet	17.9	0.5	28.9	6.9	4.4	1.0	2.2	3.7	33.8	0.7
Andst	31.5	1.3	21.9	6.3	5.6	0.5	1.4	5.0	24.9	1.6
Gesten	30.9	1.4	14.8	6.4	4.4	0.6	3.5	3.4	32.9	1.9
Bække	28.7	0.7	26.2	7.7	2.8	0.8	2.7	5.7	23.6	1.2

== Results ==
Party		Votes	%	+/-	Seats	+/-
Vejen Municipality
V	Venstre	6,888	30.75	-4.79	9	-1
A	Social Democrats	6,290	28.08	-0.23	8	0
C	Conservatives	5,229	23.34	+9.59	6	+2
D	New Right	1,019	4.55	+3.13	1	+1
F	Green Left	772	3.45	+0.51	1	0
O	Danish People's Party	740	3.30	-6.28	1	-1
L	Liberal Borgerliste	588	2.63	New	1	New
Ø	Red-Green Alliance	407	1.82	-2.28	0	-1
B	Social Liberals	392	1.75	+0.86	0	0
I	Liberal Alliance	75	0.33	-2.83	0	-1
Total		22,400	100	N/A	27	N/A
Invalid votes		113	0.34	+0.20		
Blank votes		296	0.89	0.0		
Turnout		22,809	68.30	-3.57		
Source: valg.dk
