= Listed buildings in Vejen Municipality =

This is a list of listed buildings in Vejen Municipality, Denmark.

== The list ==
=== 6600 Vejen ===
Listing name	Image	Location	Coordinates	Description
Aftægtshus til Gården		Skolegade 12, 6600 Vejen	55°29′5.14″N 9°8′27.92″E	
Askov Nedergård		Vejenvej 10, 6600 Vejen		
Askov Nedergård		Vejenvej 10, 6600 Vejen		
Askov Nedergård		Vejenvej 10, 6600 Vejen		
Askov Nedergård		Vejenvej 10, 6600 Vejen		
Borgergade 10		Borgergade 10, 6600 Vejen		
Det Gule Hus		Koldingvej 52, 6600 Vejen		
Estrup		Esbjergvej 40, 6600 Vejen		
Estrup		Esbjergvej 51, 6600 Vejen		
Estrup		Esbjergvej 51, 6600 Vejen		
Malt gamle Præstegård		Maltvej 94, 6600 Vejen		
Malt gamle Præstegård		Maltvej 94, 6600 Vejen		
Petersborggård		Koldingvej 33, 6600 Vejen		
Petersborggård		Koldingvej 33, 6600 Vejen		
Petersborggård		Koldingvej 33, 6600 Vejen		
Vejen Præstegård		Præstevænget 32A, 6600 Vejen	55°29′5.14″N 9°8′27.92″E	
Vejen Station		Banegårdspladsen 1, 6600 Vejen		
Vejen Station		Banegårdspladsen 1, 6600 Vejen		
Vejen Station		Banegårdspladsen 1A, 6600 Vejen		

=== 6630 Rødding ===
Listing name	Image	Location	Coordinates	Description
Hygum Hjemstavnsgård		Ollingvej 1, 6630 Rødding		
Hygum Hjemstavnsgård		Ollingvej 1, 6630 Rødding		
Hygum Hjemstavnsgård		Ollingvej 1, 6630 Rødding		
Hygum Hjemstavnsgård		Ollingvej 1, 6630 Rødding		
Jels Mølle		Jels Møllegade 5, 6630 Rødding		
Knag Mølle		Knagmøllevej 8, 6630 Rødding		

=== 6650 Brørup ===
Listing name	Image	Location	Coordinates	Description
Stenbrogård		Vejlevej 1, 6650 Brørup		
Stenbrogård		Vejlevej 1, 6650 Brørup		
Stenbrogård		Vejlevej 1, 6650 Brørup		
Stenbrogård		Vejlevej 1, 6650 Brørup		
Sønderskov		Sønderskovgårdvej 2, 6650 Brørup		
Toftager		Surhavevej 24, 6650 Brørup		
Toftager		Surhavevej 24, 6650 Brørup		
Toftager		Surhavevej 24, 6650 Brørup		
Toftager		Surhavevej 24, 6650 Brørup		

=== 6670 Holsted ===
Listing name	Image	Location	Coordinates	Description
Østergade 14		Østergade 14, 6670 Holsted	55°29′5.14″N 9°8′27.92″E	
