= Brændstrup =

Village in Southern Jutland, Denmark

- Village
- Map showing the location of Brændstrup in Denmark
- Coordinates: 55.330519°N 9.056850°E
- Country: Denmark
- Region: Region of Southern Denmark
- Municipality: Vejen Municipality

Population (2000)
  - Total: 203
- Time zone: UTC+1 (CET)
  - Summer (DST): UTC+2 (CEST)
- Postal code: DK-6630 Rødding

Brændstrup (older alternative spelling: Brendstrup) is a village in Southern Jutland, Denmark. The population of the village is c. 200.

Located about 4 kilometres (2.5 mi) north of Gram and equidistantly south of Rødding, Brændstrup was until 1 January 2007 a part of the former Rødding Municipality, and is now a part of Vejen Municipality. Neighbouring municipalities are Haderslev Municipality to the south of Brændstrup and Esbjerg Municipality to the west.

Brændstrup is known for its Christian school, Brændstrup Kristne Friskole, and the Harley Davidson service center located in the middle of Brændstrup was until 1 January 2017, one of only three authorized HD retailers in Denmark.

Brændstrup was for 39 years from 1899 to 1938, a railway town on the part of Haderslev Amts Jernbaner running between Gram Castel and Rødding.

A local attraction worth noticing is Stenmanden ("The Stone Man"), a monument of unknown origin residing in the nearby Gram Storskov forest.

== Notable people ==
The conservative politician Johannes Jørgen Dixen Burgdorf (1917-1983), who served as a Member of Parliament from 1966 until his death, was a resident of Brændstrup.

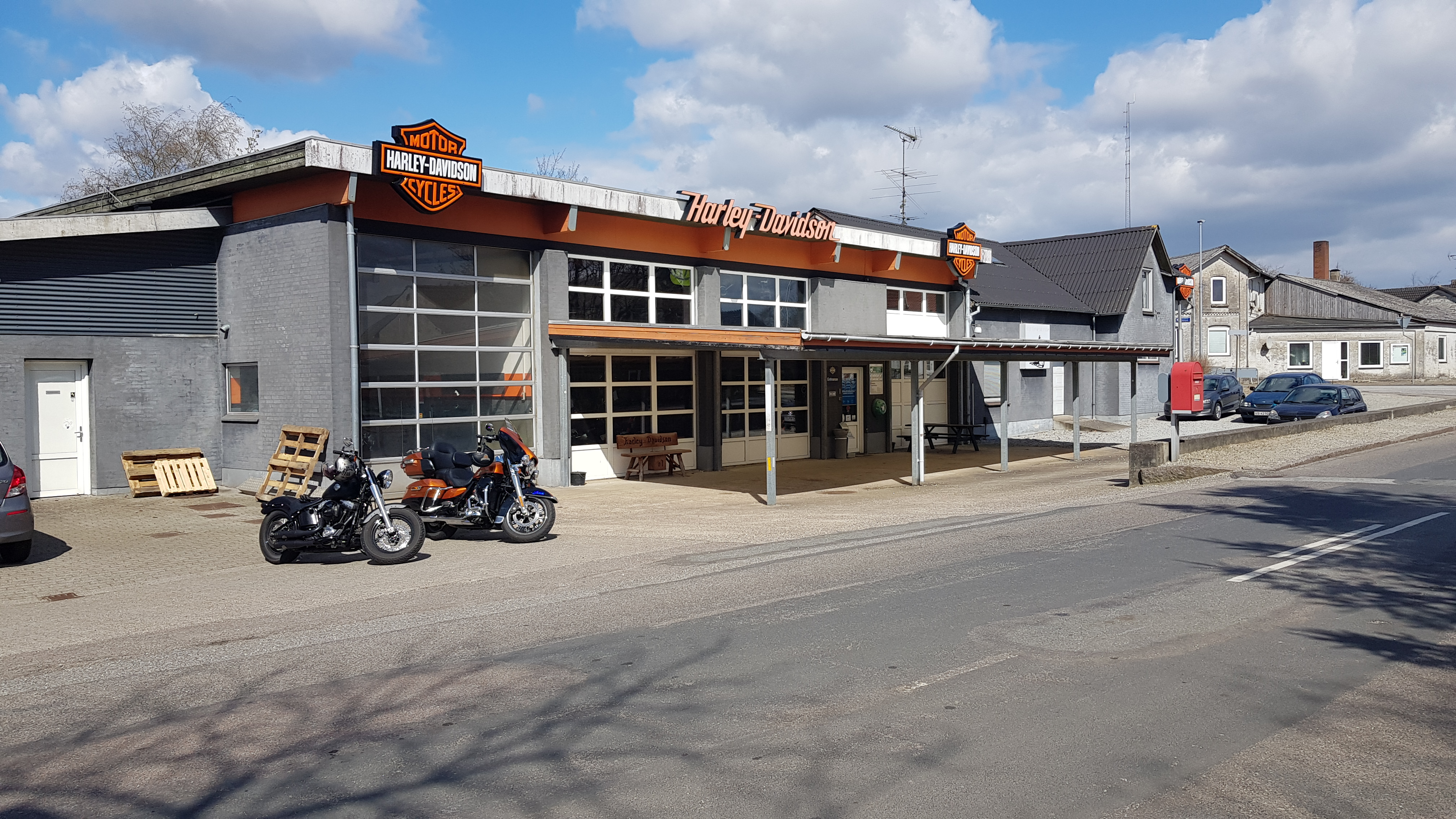
The Harley Davidson shop

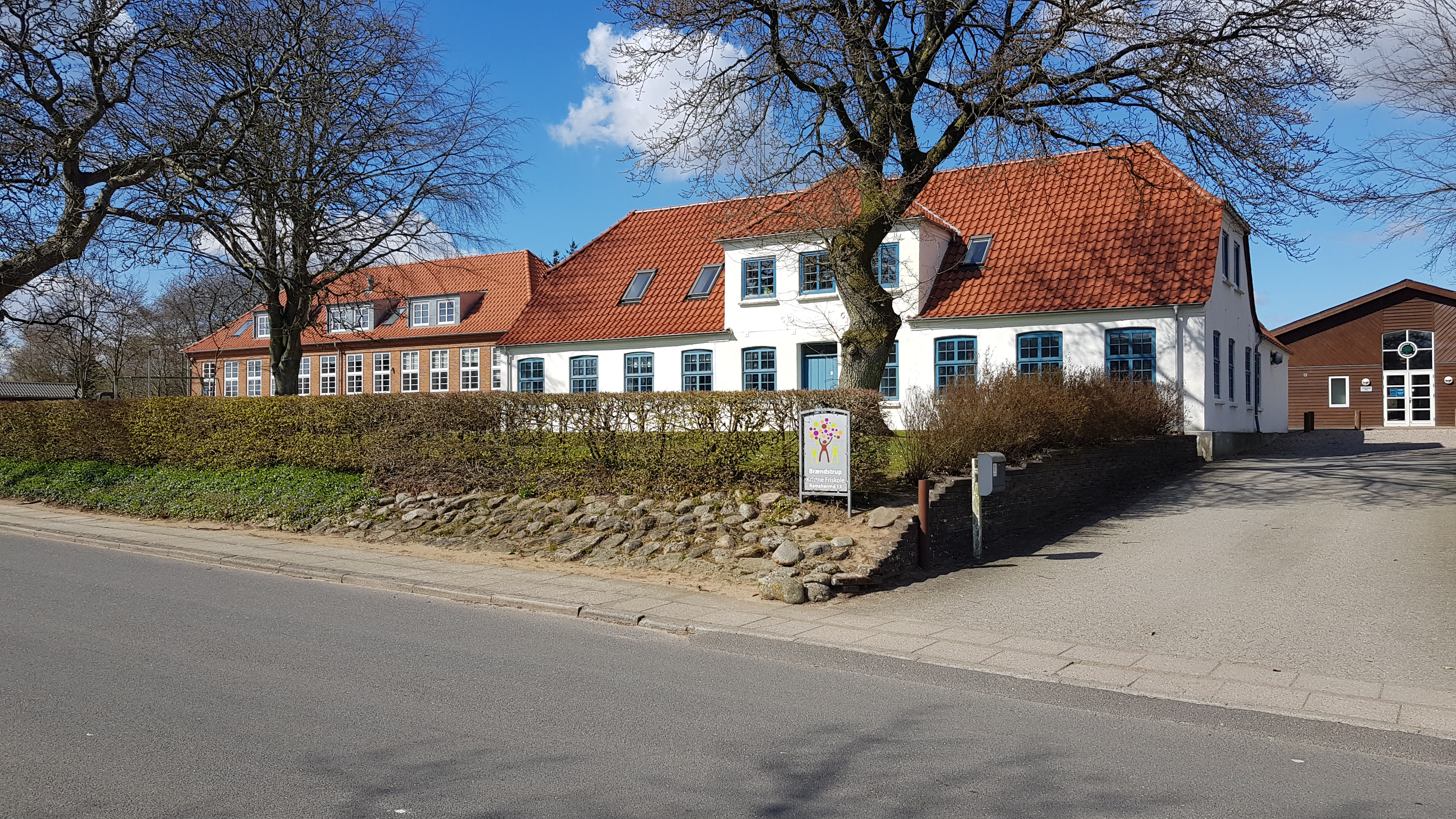
The Christian school

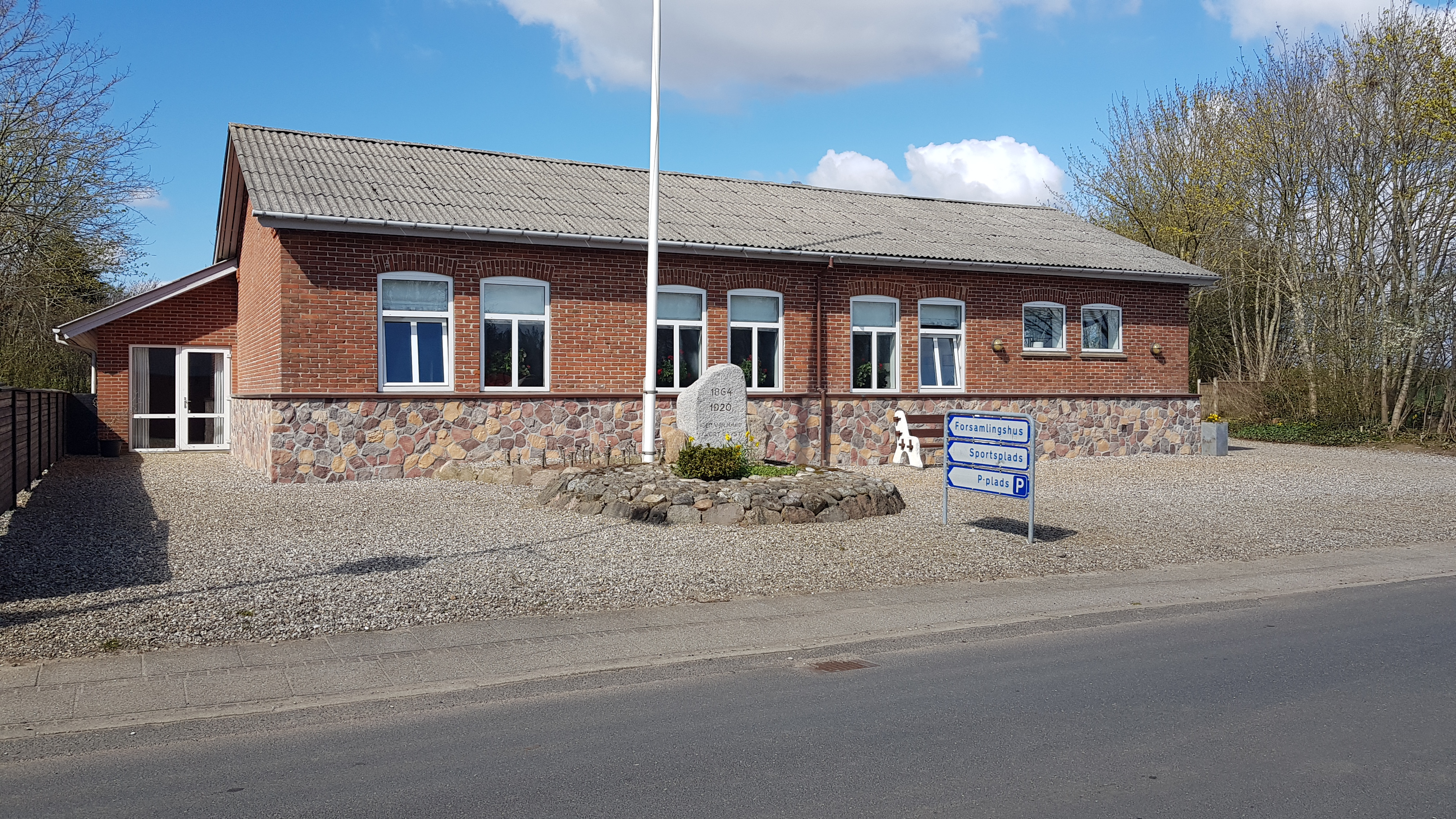
