= Sønderskov =

Manor house and local historic museum in Vejen

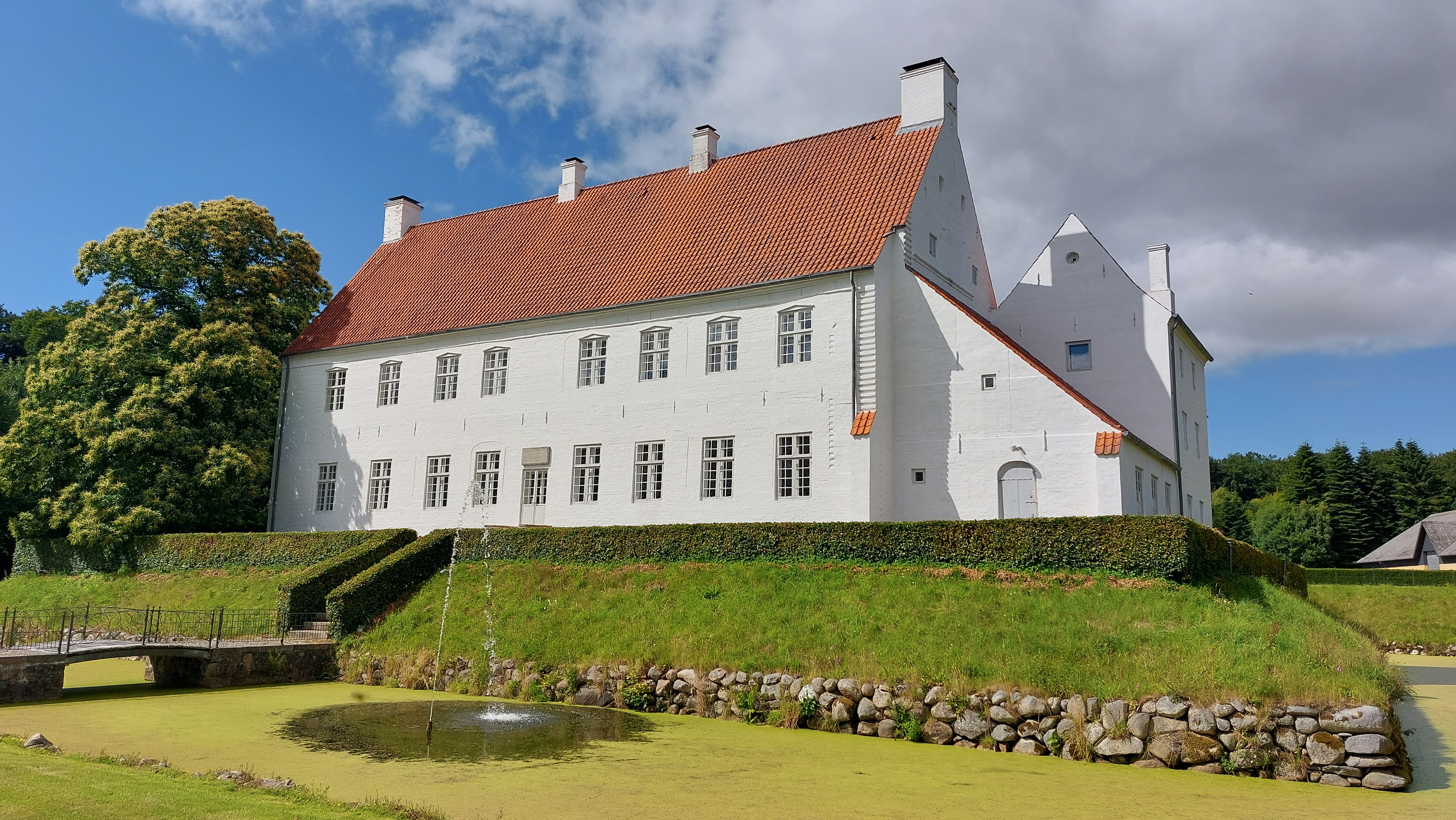
- Interactive map of the Sønderskov area

General information
- Location: Vejen Municipality, Denmark
- Coordinates: 55°27′6.44″N 9°2′16.15″E
- Completed: 1620
- Client: Hinrich Ladiges

Sønderskov is a former manor house situated close to Brørup, 7 km southwest of Vejen, Vejen Municipality, in Southern Jutland, Denmark. The three-winged, white-washed main building dates from the 1620s and is surrounded by moats. It was listed on the Danish registry of protected buildings and places in 1918. It is operated as a museum of local history.

== History ==
=== Early history ===
The first known owner of Sønderskov was Niels Lagesen Rudbek. In 1390, he owned Sønderskov and Nielsbygaard. By 1448, Sønderskov had passed into the ownership of Jakob Nielsen through his marriage to the heir of its former owner. As he was not of noble descent, he was not entitled to own a manor, and he therefore chose to transfer the property to Ribe Cathedral Chapter. It is not known when exactly the cathedral chapter parted with the estate, but by 1483 it was owned by Henrik Steen, who was related to Jakob Nielsen's wife.

=== Galskyt and Rosenkrantz ===
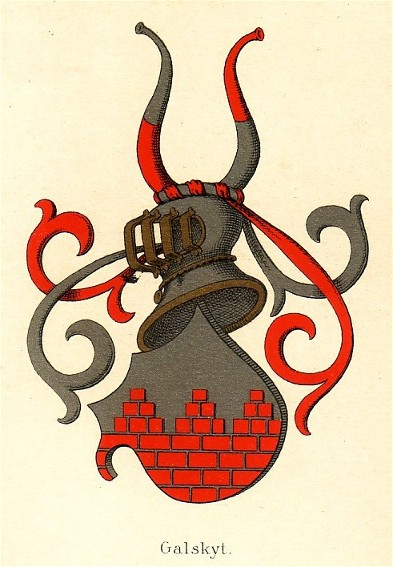
Galskyt's coat of arms

On Steen's death Sønderskov was divided between his son Niels Steen and daughter Anne Steensdatter. Anne Steensdatter eventually took over her brother's share of the estate. She brought it into her marriage to Thomas Galskyt. Sønderskov remained in the Galskytte family until the end of the century. A new main building with two diagonally placed towers was constructed in the middle of the century. Thomas Galskyt's two sons—who both owned Sønderskov—were both killed by fellow noblemen. In 1554, Peder Galskyt was killed by Johan Juel. In 1574, Otto Galskyt was killed by Jakob Skram.

Peder Galskyt's widow Bege Clausdatter survived her son Albert. Her son-in-law Christoffer Rosenkrantz was later executed for embezzlement. In 1600, she sold Sønderskov to Børge Rosenkrantz. He kept Sønderskov until his death in 1614, but spent most of his time on his Scanian estate Ørup.

=== Juel and Due ===
On Rosenkrantz's death in 1614 Sønderskov was sold to Thomas Juel. He was already the owner of nearby Estrup Manor. Sønderskov's main building was destroyed by fire shortly after the sale. Juel immediately embarked on the construction of a new main building. The Renaissance-style building was completed in 1620.

In 1620, Juel completed a new main building on his estate.

Thomas Juel's nephew Manderup Due inherited Sønderskov from his uncle in 1648. He was also a fiefholder in Thy. His holdings were later passed down to his son Jørgen Skeel Due. He spent considerably more time on the Sønderskov estate than his father had. In the 1690s, he purchased Føvling Church.

After Jørgen Skeel Due's death, the estate was taken over by his son, Jens Christoffer Due, who was heavily in debt. In 1720, he had to mortgage the estate to Hans Bachmann.

=== Bachmann and Claudius ===
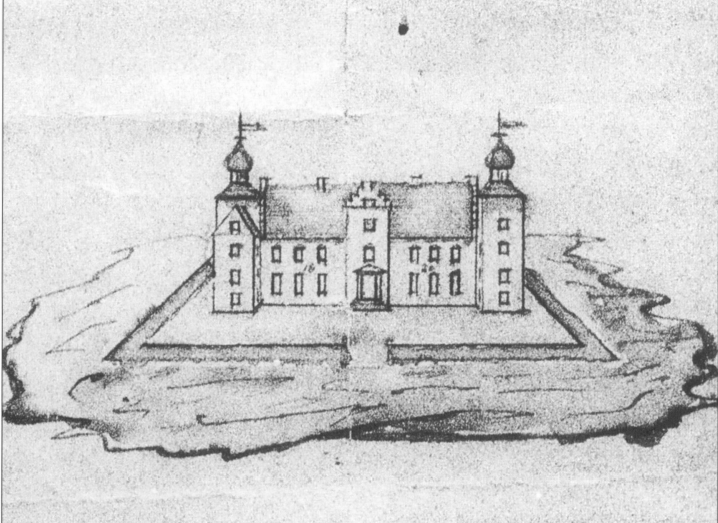
Sønderskov in the 18th century

The ownership of Sønderskov was eventually transferred to Bachmann. He was only survived by his wife Christina Margrethe Bachmann (née Claussen) by one year. On her death in 1746, Sønderskov passed to their daughter, Christine Margrethe Bachmann, who three years later brought it into marriage to Samuel Nicolaus Claudius. He served as county manager of Løgumkloster. In 1753, he installed a new pulpit and altarpiece in Gøvling Church.

Claudius wanted to improve the management of the estate, but ended up losing a legal dispute with copyholders.

=== Changing owners, 1769–1818 ===
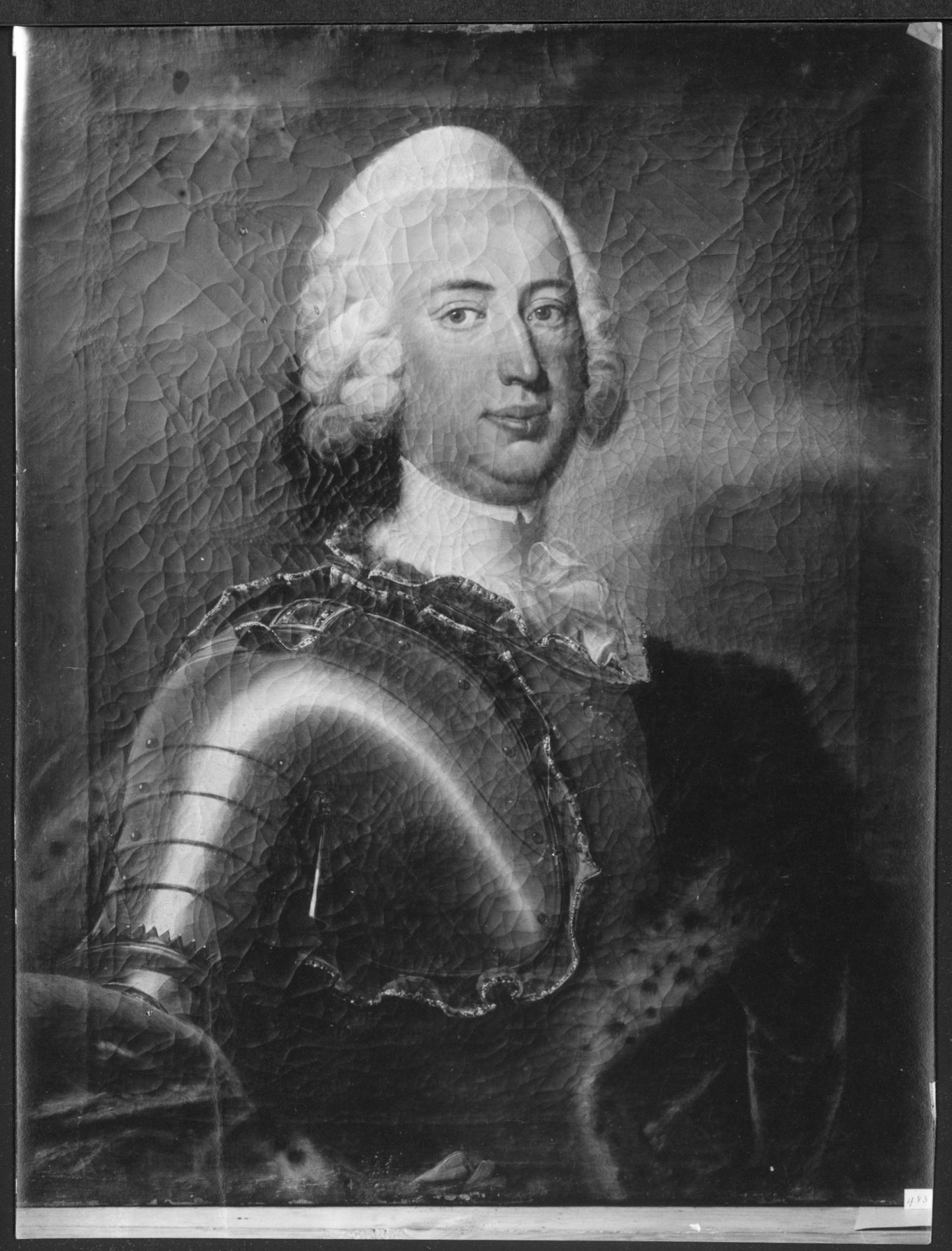
Frederik Christian Otto Wedel Jarlsberg

In 1769, Claudius sold Sønderskov to Jens Fr. Wodschou. The next owner was Frederik Christian Otto Wedel Jarlsberg. His other holdings included Basnæs on Zealand and Glorup on Funen. He died at Sønderskov in 1779. The estate changed hands many times over the next decades, while many of the copyholds were converted into freeholds and some of the land that belonged to the manor was sold off in lots.

=== Momsen family ===
In 1818, Sønderskov was acquired by Peder Momsen. The estate was subsequently owned by members of the Momsen family for over one hundred years.

=== 20th century ===
In 1925, the estate was acquired by J. Bundsgaard in exchange for other land. It then once again changed hands many times over the next years. In the 1970s, it fell into a state of disrepair. In 1986, it was acquired by master carpenter Helge Kragelund. He undertook a comprehensive renovation of the main building over the next seven years.

== Architecture ==
The three-winged main building dates from the 1620s. It is a white-washed brick building with visible wall anchors and a pitched roof clad in red tile. The roof ridge is pierced by four white-washed brick chimneys. The three wings are of similar height, but the northern main wing is only divided into two storeys whereas the two side wings (east and west) are divided into three storeys.

The building is surrounded by moats. The surrounding park has a large vegetable garden.

== Interior ==
The museum's vestibule features a large runestone from the ninth century. The ticket office is decorated with the interior furnishings of an old grocery shop. A room on the first floor features a set of canvas tapestries with eight scenes from François de Salignac de la Mothe‑Fénelon's 1699 novel Les Aventures de Télémaque. They were most likely installed during Claudius' ownership in 1750–1769. Another mural is based on one of Jacob de Gheyn's illustrations for the 1717 117 engravings for the military manual The Exercise of Armes.

== List of owners ==
List of owners:

- (1448) Jakob Nielsen
- (1448–1483) Ribe kapitel
- (1483–1505) Henrik Steen
- ( – ) Niels Henriksen Steen
- (1532) Thomas Galskyt
- (1548–1550) Peder Galskyt
- (1550– ) Otto Galskyt
- (1572–1593) Albert Galskyt
- (1593–1600) Bege Galskyt née Clausdatter Emmiksen
- ( –1600) Christoffer Rosenkrantz
- ( –1600) Johanne Galskyt
- (1600–1614) Børge Rosenkrantz
- (1611) Palle Rosenkrantz
- (1614–1647) Thomas Juel
- (1647–1648) Maren Juel née Bølle
- (1649–1660) Manderup Due
- (1660–1701) Jørgen Skeel Due
- (1701–1718)Albert Skeel Due
- (1718– ) Jørgen Christoffer Due
- ( –1745) Hans Bachmann
- (1745–1746) Christina Margrethe Bachmann née Clausen
- (1746–1750) Christine Margrethe Claudius Bachmann
- (1750–1769) Samuel Nicolaus Claudius
- (1769–1775) Jens Fr. Wodschou
- (1775–1776) Frederik Christian Otto Wedel Jarlsberg
- (1776–1779) Estate of Frederik Christian Otto Wedel Jarlsberg
- (1779–1784) Søren Bjerring
- (1784) T. J. de Thygeson
- (1784–1793) Hans Gundorph
- (1793–1797) Jens Hundevadt
- (1797–1804) Christian Saxesen
- (1804–1812) Peter Momsen
- (1812) Partnership: C. Thomsen, Ditlev Monrad and A.N. Flensborg
- (1812) V. Tersling
- (1812–1815) Henrik J. G. Grandjean
- (1815–1819) Joachim G. Wedell-Wedellsborg
- (1819–1846) Peter Momsen
- (1846–1887) Jens Rahr Momsen
- (1887–1894) Widow Momsen
- (1894–1925) Peter Momsen
- (1925 ) J. Bundsgaard
- (1925–1926) Frederik Legarth
- (1926–1927) A. Krause
- (1927–1929) M. Andersen
- (1929–1939) Niels Brüel
- (1939–1962) Johannes Lind
- (1962– ) D. Karstens
- (1986– ) Helge Kragelund
- ( – ) Sønderskov Museum

== Gallery ==
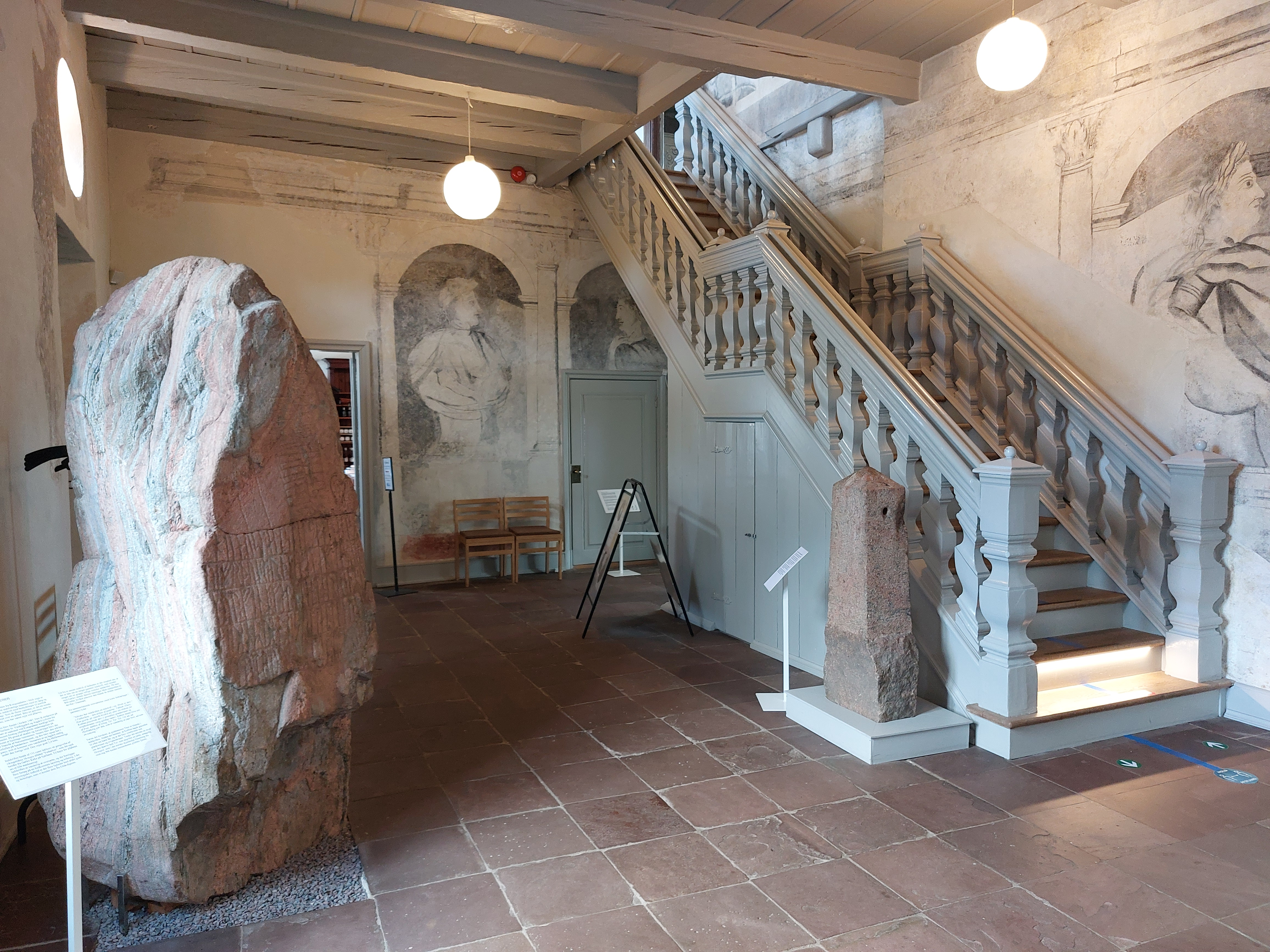

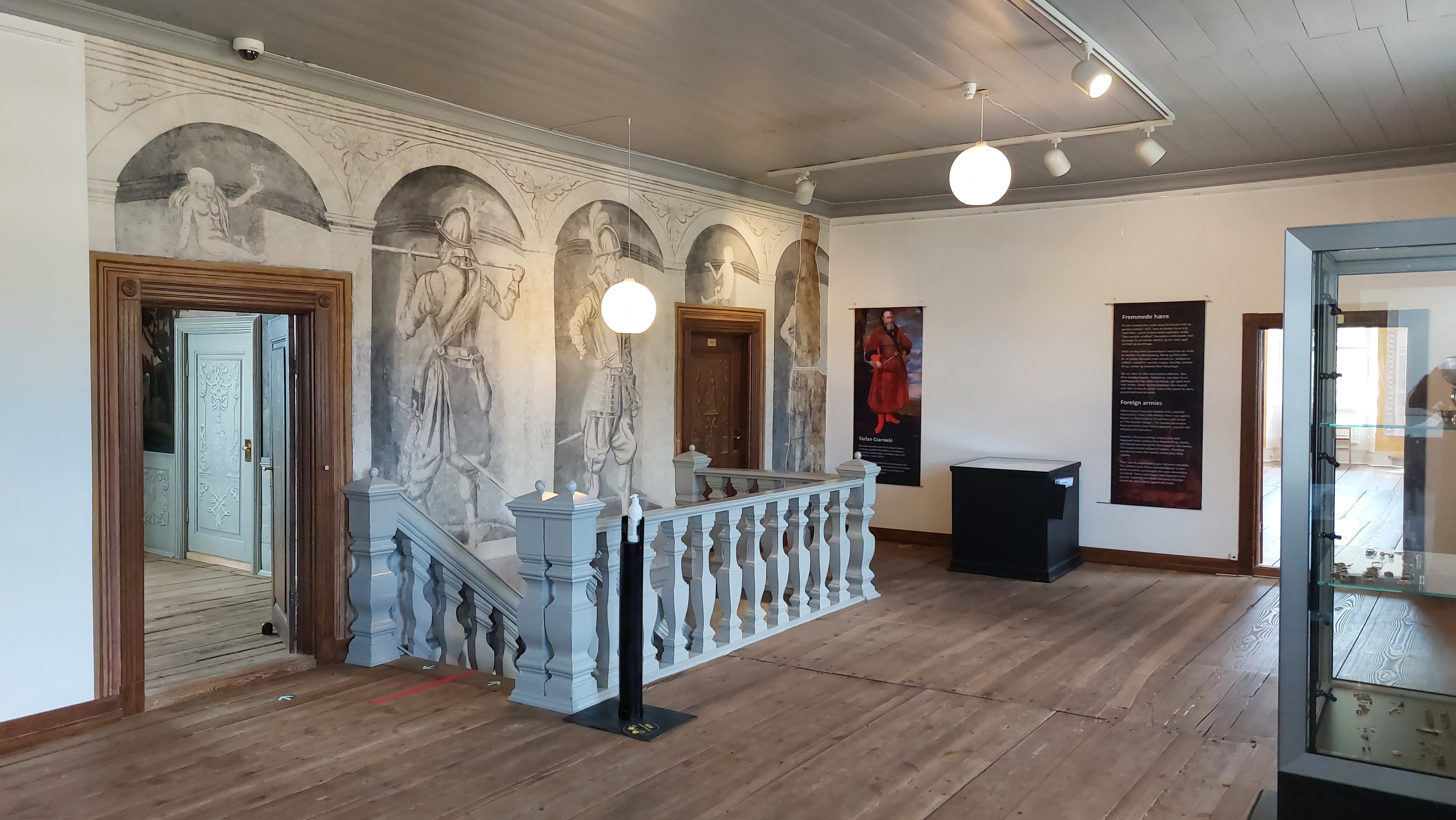

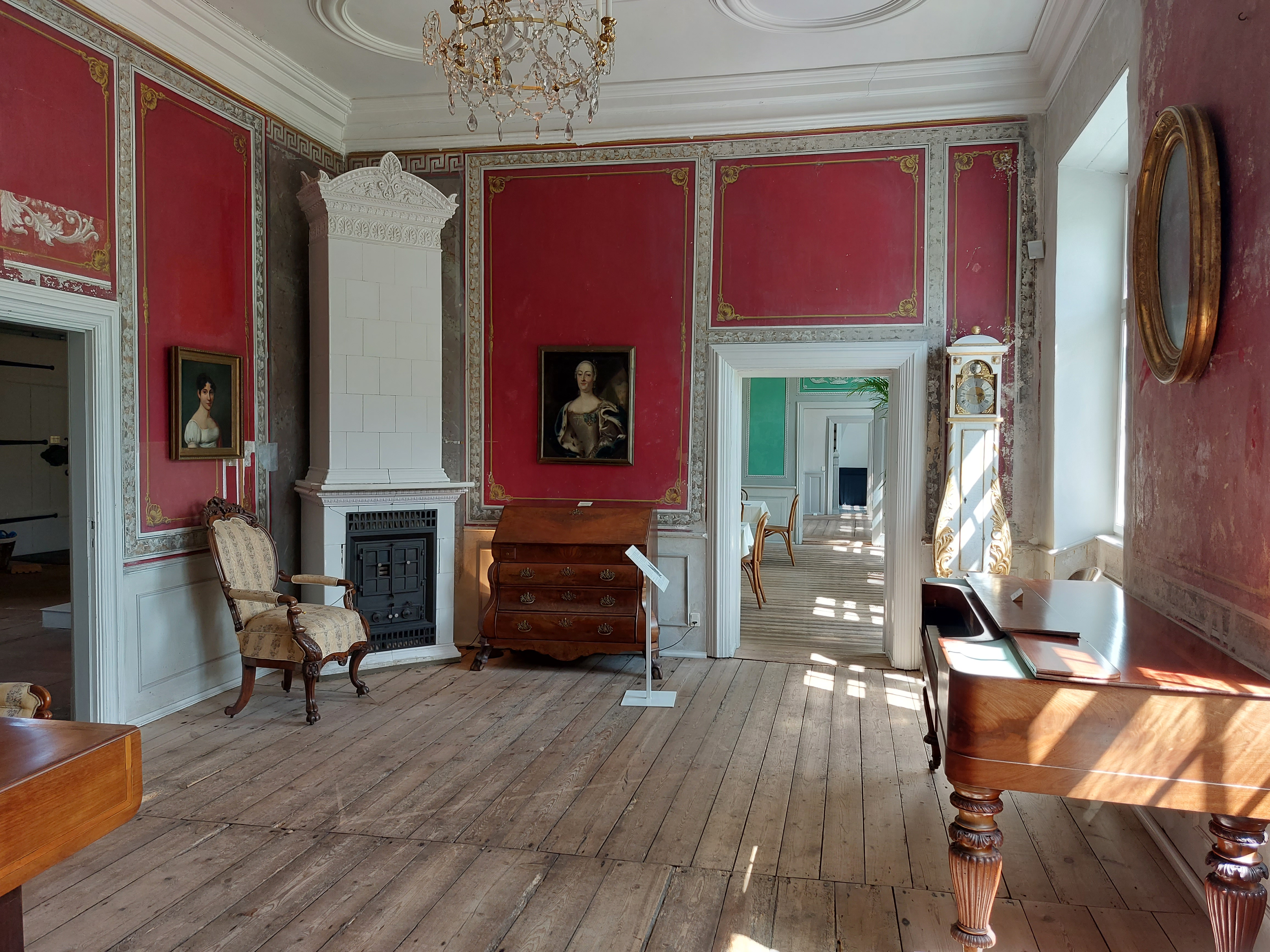

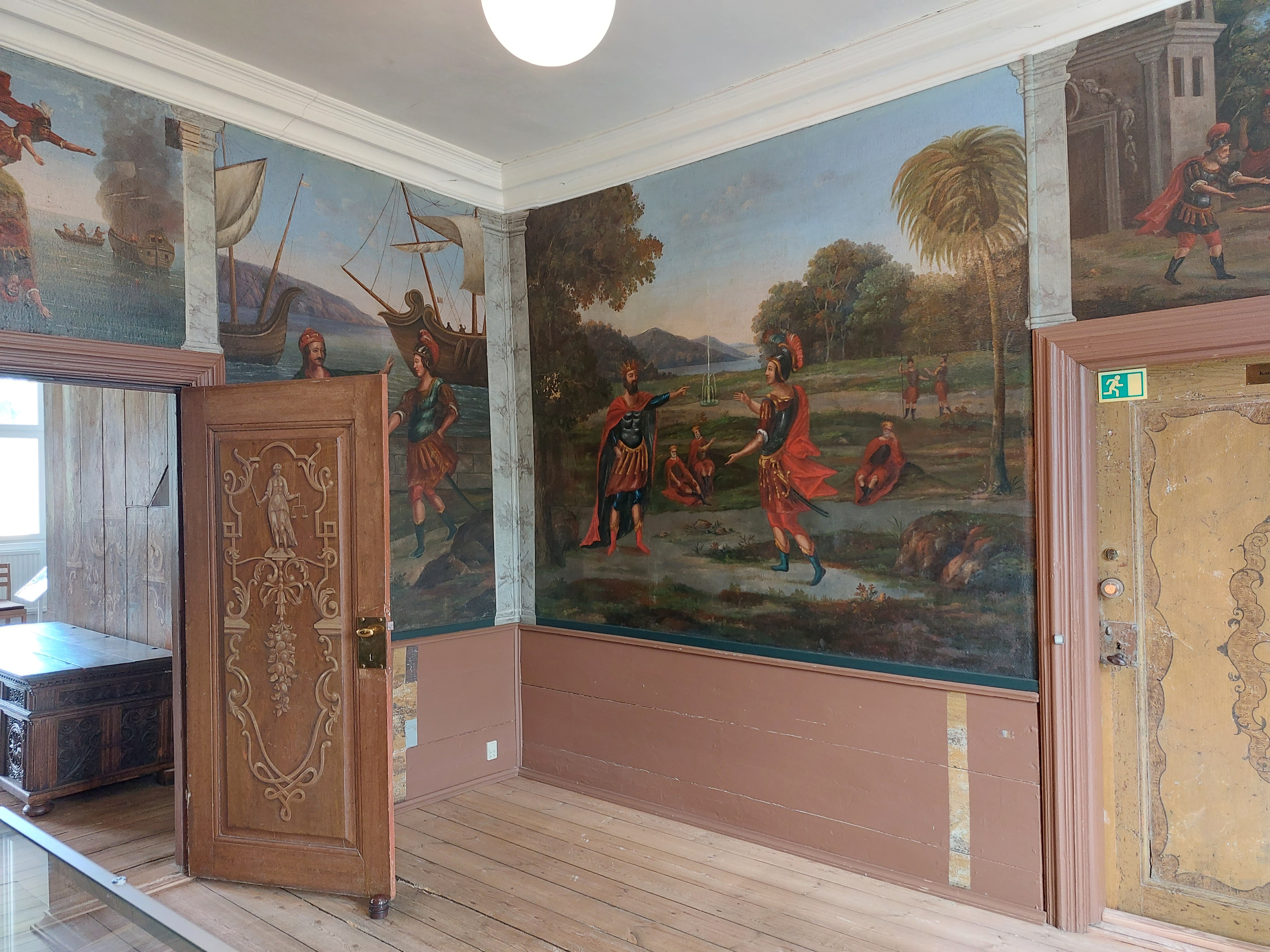

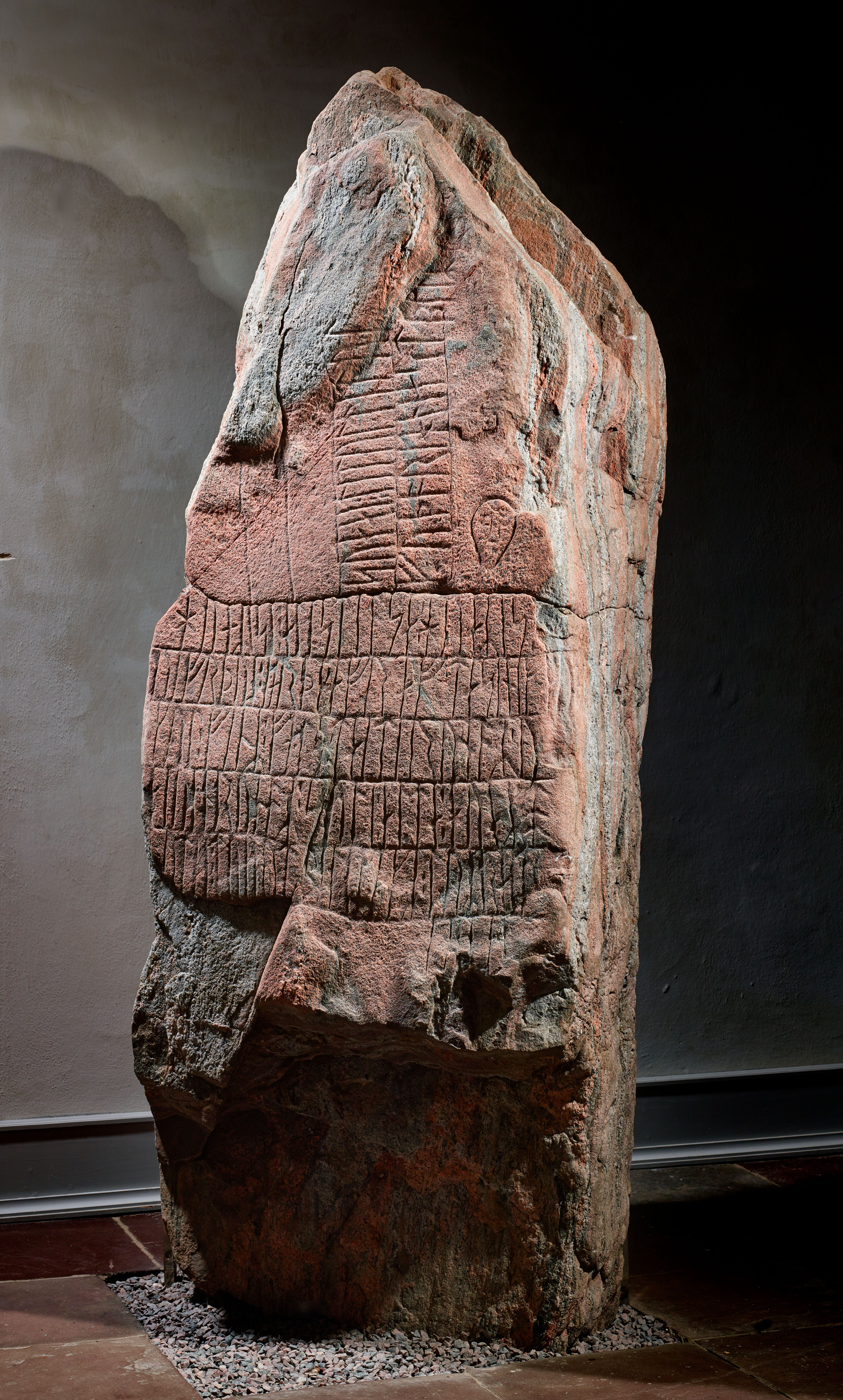
Closeup of the runestone in the vestibule
