= Karen Gormsen =

Danish nurse, missionary and orphanage founder (1880–1960)

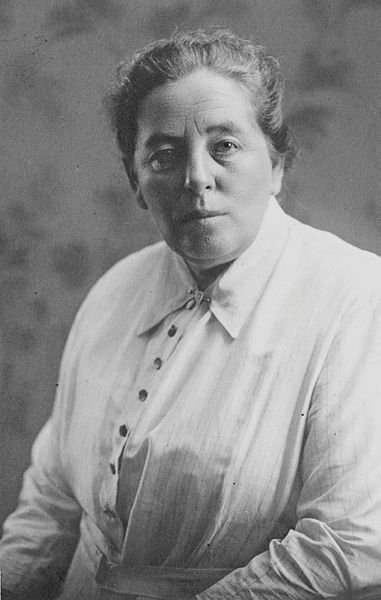

Personal life
- Born: Karen Dorthea Gormsen; 21 February 1880 Vøjstrup, Nørre Broby Parish, Denmark
- Died: 2 December 1960 (aged 80) Copenhagen, Denmark
- Occupation: Nurse; missionary; orphanage director

Religious life
- Religion: Christianity
- Denomination: Lutheranism

Karen Dorthea Gormsen (21 February 1880 – 2 December 1960) was a Danish nurse, Lutheran missionary and orphanage founder and director active in Antung (present-day Dandong).

== Early life and education ==
Gormsen was born on 21 February 1880 in Vøjstrup, Nørre Broby Parish to Hans Peter Gormsen (1847–1935), a farmer, and Anna Johanne Nielsen (1844–1929), a spinner, sewist and farmworker.

From 1900 to 1904, Gormsen trained as a nurse at Copenhagen Municipal Hospital and later worked as a nurse in Kerteminde. Gormsen joined the Danish Missionary Society (DMS), and in 1905 studied at a women's mission school in Andst.

== Career ==
In November 1906, arrived in Antung and began working at the newly founded Danish hospital as a midwife. Responsible for the women's ward, Gormsen began taking in abandoned children. Word of Gormsen's actions spread and children began being left outside the hospital, the majority of whom were girls due to son preference. Inspired by the baby hatches used by the Fødselsstiftelsen in Copenhagen, Gormsen installed a hatch at the now completed Danish hospital in 1908.

In recognition of her work during the 1909 cholera epidemic, Gormsen was awarded a plot of land by the Antung authorities. Gormsen built an orphanage on the land which was officially opened in 1916. Until 1931, the orphanage was supported by both private Danish donations and the Antung authorities.

Gormsen continued to run the orphanage throughout the Japanese and Soviet occupation of Antung. In the aftermath of the Second World War the orphanage housed around 300 children. Following the Proclamation of the People's Republic of China in 1949, Gormsen began trying try to place children in private homes. In 1950, Gormsen was declared a counter-revolutionary by the Chinese Communist Party and the orphanages remaining children were forcibly sent for re-education. In December 1950, Gormsen left China. Gormsen's memoirs My Children in China was posthumously published in 1961. In 1980, Gormsen was posthumously rehabilitated.

== Personal life ==
On 2 December 1960 Gormsen died in Copenhagen, aged 80.
