= JELS =

Jels or JELS may refer to:

- Jels, Denmark, a town in Denmark
- Journal of Empirical Legal Studies, an academic journal that covers research on the law, legal procedure, and legal theory
