= Jonas Coldingensis =

Danish priest, historian and topographer

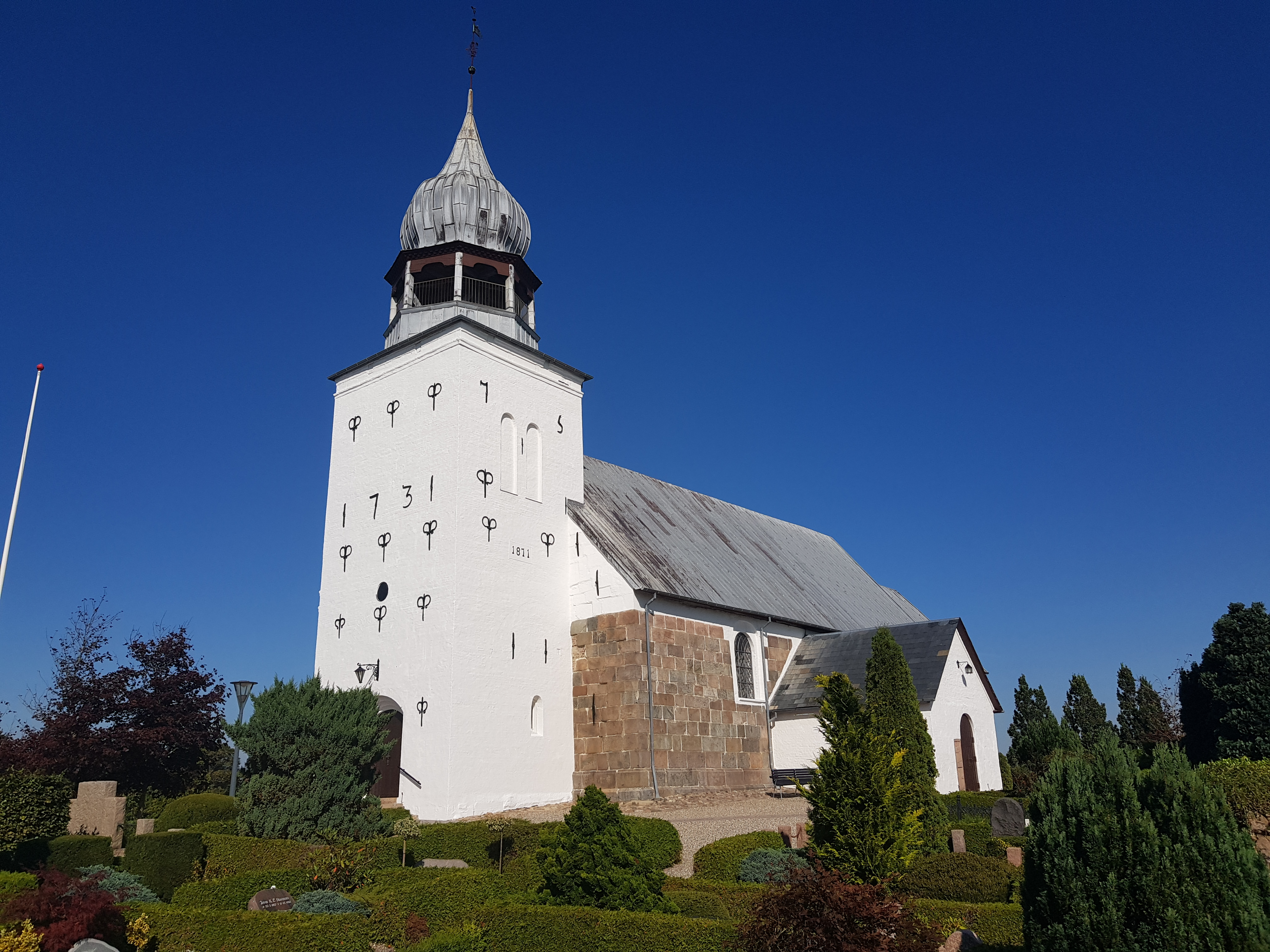
Andst Church in Store Andst

Jon Jensen Kolding (Latin: Jonas Coldingensis) (d. 1609) was a Danish priest, historian and topographer. His most notable work was Daniæ descriptio nova.

== Biography ==
Jon Jensen Kolding was born near Kolding, Denmark and was educated in the Diocese of Ribe. In 1566 he became rector of Kolding. He entered the priesthood in 1573. He was assigned to Andst Church (Andst Kirke) in the parish at Store Andst in Vejen. In coordination with Caspar Markdanner (1533–1618) lensman at Koldinghus, he had Andst Church equipped with a tower with an onion-shaped lantern spire.

Jon Jensen Kolding wrote a number of works which were published in Latin under the name Jonas Coldingensis. He wrote the topographical work Daniæ descriptio nova which was printed at Frankfurt in 1549. In 1584 he published Coronarium. Brevem descriptionem Daniæ and in 1594 En ny Danmarksbeskrivelse both providing descriptions of the Realm of Denmark. He received a Magister degree in 1591.
