= Karen Finch =

Danish-British weaver, conservator and educator (1921–2018)

Dr Karen Finch OBE
- in 2014
- Born: Karen Finch; 8 May 1921; Rødding, Denmark
- Died: 15 April 2018 (aged 96)
- Occupations: master weaver; conservator; educator
- Years active: 1946–2018
- Spouse: Norman Finch
- Website: Karen Finch Textiles

Karen Solveig Sinding Møller Finch OBE (8 May 1921 – 15 April 2018) was a Danish-born British master weaver, conservator and educator who was the founder of the Textile Conservation Centre.

== Life ==
Karen Finch was born in May 1921 on a farm in Rødding in Denmark to Soren Møller and Ellen Sinding. She left the farm to study art in Copenhagen under Gerda Henning and Kaare Klint. She witnessed the occupation of her country and moved to England after she married Norman Finch in 1946.

After working as a weaver and conservator for the Royal School of Needlework and the Victoria and Albert Museum she set up her own home-based studio in Acton in 1959. She had to fold her bed to make room for her work and the golden crown of Haile Selassie was steamed on the top of her bathroom cupboard. She went on to work on valuable textiles including items owned by Royal Pretender Bonnie Prince Charlie and film star Marlene Dietrich.

Encouraged by Stella Mary Newton, in 1975 Finch founded the Textile Conservation Centre at Hampton Court Palace to conserve textiles professionally. She was appointed OBE in the following year. She retired in 1986 but continued to travel and lecture about textiles. In 1998 the TCC moved to a purpose-built textile conservation centre in Winchester under the auspices of Southampton University. It continued as a centre of excellence until 2009. When the centre closed it was re-formed at the University of Glasgow.

She published many articles and two books on conservation of textiles: Caring for Textiles in 1977, and The Care and Preservation of Textiles with Greta Putnam in 1985. In November 2015, she was awarded the Balfour of Burleigh Tercentenary Prize for Exceptional Achievement in Crafts.

== Legacy ==
Finch's work continues at the textile centre at the University of Glasgow. The Textile Conservation Foundation named a bursary in her honour and a prize to celebrate the founding of the TCC.
