= Tirslund Rock =

Glacial erratic in Denmark

Tirslund Rock Tirslundstenen
- Glacial erratic
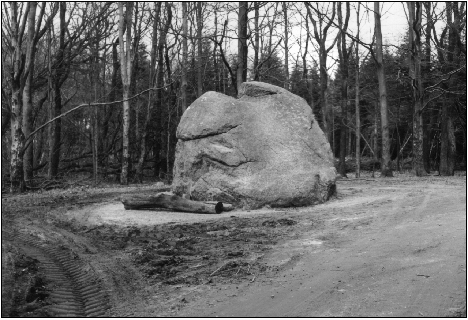

- Location within Denmark
- Coordinates: 55.4905°N 8.9590°E
- Location: Near Brørup, (Jutland)
- Geology: Glacial erratic

Tirslund Rock or Tirslundstenen is a glacial erratic in Denmark. Deposited during the Ice Age it lies in The Tirslund Plantation 4 km west of Brørup. It is Jutland's largest granite boulder and the seventh largest in Denmark. Its height is 3.5 metres above the ground and it is 16 metres in circumference. The weight is about 340 tons. The rock was put under protection in 1832.

== History ==
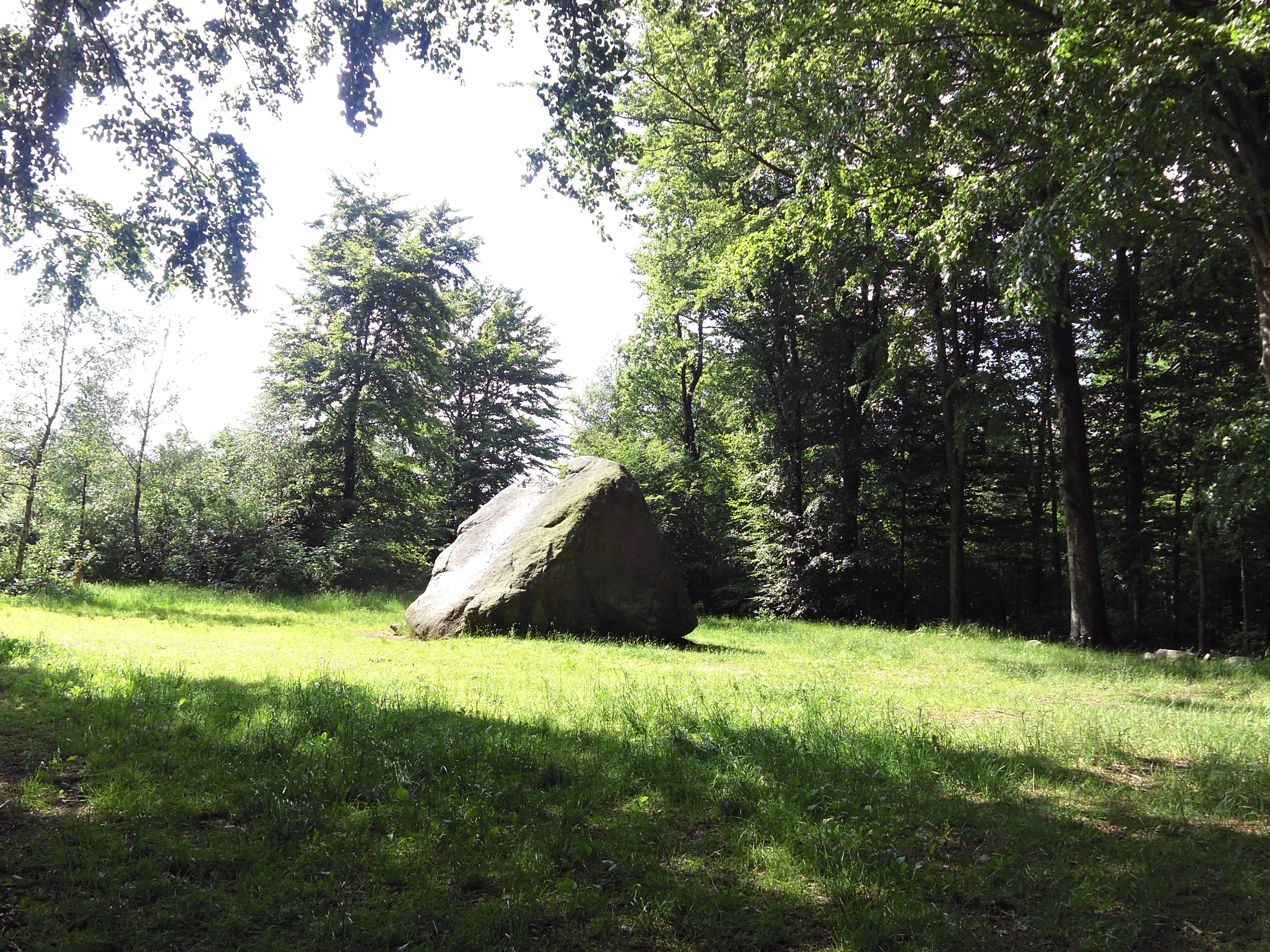
The erratic and its environment

According to the legend, King Harald Bluetooth wanted to use the Tirslund Rock as a memorial stone on his parents Gorm the Old and Thyra's burial mounds in Jelling. It was supposed to be transported on a great iron sled, but as the legend says, enemies forced King Harrold to abandon this enterprise. So the stone was left where it stands and the iron sled is said still to exist buried along with great treasure deep in the ground.

In the late 18th century an attempt to blow up the stone was made by the local pastor, but he managed only to blow a small piece off the top.

== See also ==
- List of individual rocks
