= Danish Missionary Society =

Christian missionary society

- Successor: Danmission
- Formation: 17 June 1821
- Dissolved: January 2000
- Type: Christian missionary society
- Purpose: Christian mission and evangelism; Education; Healthcare; Poverty alleviation
- Headquarters: Copenhagen, Denmark
- Region served: Worldwide especially Africa, Asia and Caribbean
- Official language: English; Danish

The Danish Missionary Society (Danish: Det Danske Missionsselskab) was a Christian missionary society based in Copenhagen and affiliated to the Evangelical Lutheran Church in Denmark. It was founded on 17 June, 1821 by the Rev. Bone Falck Rønne (1764–1833), who chaired the mission board until his demise in 1833. The organisation sent missionaries to the Danish Gold Coast, Danish West Indies, Danish India, Greenland and other Danish colonies around the world. In 1828, it formed an alliance with the Basel Mission Society of Switzerland to recruit and train missionaries to be sent to the Gold Coast. In January 2000, the Danish Missionary Society merged with the Dansk Santalmission (established in 1867) to become the Danmission, focusing on poverty alleviation, interfaith dialogue and church development in twelve nations across, Africa, the Middle East and Asia.

== Notable missionaries ==
- Andreas Riis (1804–1854), a missionary to the Gold Coast for the Basel Evangelical Missionary Society
- Karen Gormsen (1880–1960), nurse, Lutheran missionary and orphanage founder and director active in Antung (present-day Dandong).
