= Fredrik Appel =

Danish architect

Fredrik Appel (8 August 1884 – 6 November 1962) was a Danish architect.

He was born at Rødding on Jutland, where his father was a folk high school teacher at Rødding Højskole. He graduated from Odense Technical School in 1903 and from the Royal Danish Academy of Fine Arts in 1913. He conducted study trips to Germany and Austria-Hungary in 1908 and in Germany and Italy in 1910. Later he was in Vienna 1922 and 1926. He was employed as an architect at the Danish State Railways in 1916, became architect assistant in 1919, course architect 1923 and department architect 1946–49. He was also the head of Taastrup Technical School and Taastrup Business School 1928-39 and ran his own drawing office from 1920 to 1944 in Taastrup. He was awarded the K.A. Larssens Legat in 1910 and later was made a knight in the Order of the Dannebrog.

== See also ==
- List of Danish architects
