= Stella Mary Newton =

English fashion designer and dress historian

Stella Mary Newton OBE, née Pearce (17 April 1901, London – 18 May 2001, London) was an English fashion designer and dress historian, who brought the history of fashion to bear on art history and the dating of paintings.

Stella Mary Pearce was the daughter of Georgiana Mary Hoby, a concert pianist, and Henry Pearce, a Manchester bookseller and socialist. Educated at Withington Girls' School, she then moved to London with her mother and joined Frank Benson's Shakespearean Company to become an actress. Turning to costume design, she became an assistant to George Sheringham and then an independent designer, designing for T. S. Eliot's pageant play The Rock (1934) and his Murder in the Cathedral (1935). and The family Reunion.

Designing for theatre and fashion, she opened her own shop in the 1930s. In 1936 she married the art critic Eric Newton. During the war they lectured on art history and design for Cambridge University's extramural department. A developing expertise in the history of dress enabled her to re-date paintings through the internal evidence of dress, as in her appendix to her husband's Tintoretto (1952). She worked as an adviser to the National Gallery between 1952 and 1961. In 1965, she founded a new postgraduate course in the History of Dress at the Courtauld Institute of Art, and ran it until 1976. Her students studied textile conservation as well as garment-making, and she encouraged Karen Finch to found the Textile Conservation Course at Hampton Court in 1975.

Newton received an OBE in 1976. She was the subject of a 1992 documentary for Channel 4's Third Wave.

== Works ==
- Health, Art and Reason: dress reformers of the 19th century, 1974
- Renaissance Theatre Costume and the Sense of the Historic Past, 1975
- Fashion in the Age of the Black Prince: a study of the years 1340-1365, 1980
- The Dress of the Venetians, 1495-1525, 1988
