= Rødding Parish, Vejen Municipality =

Rødding Parish Rødding Sogn
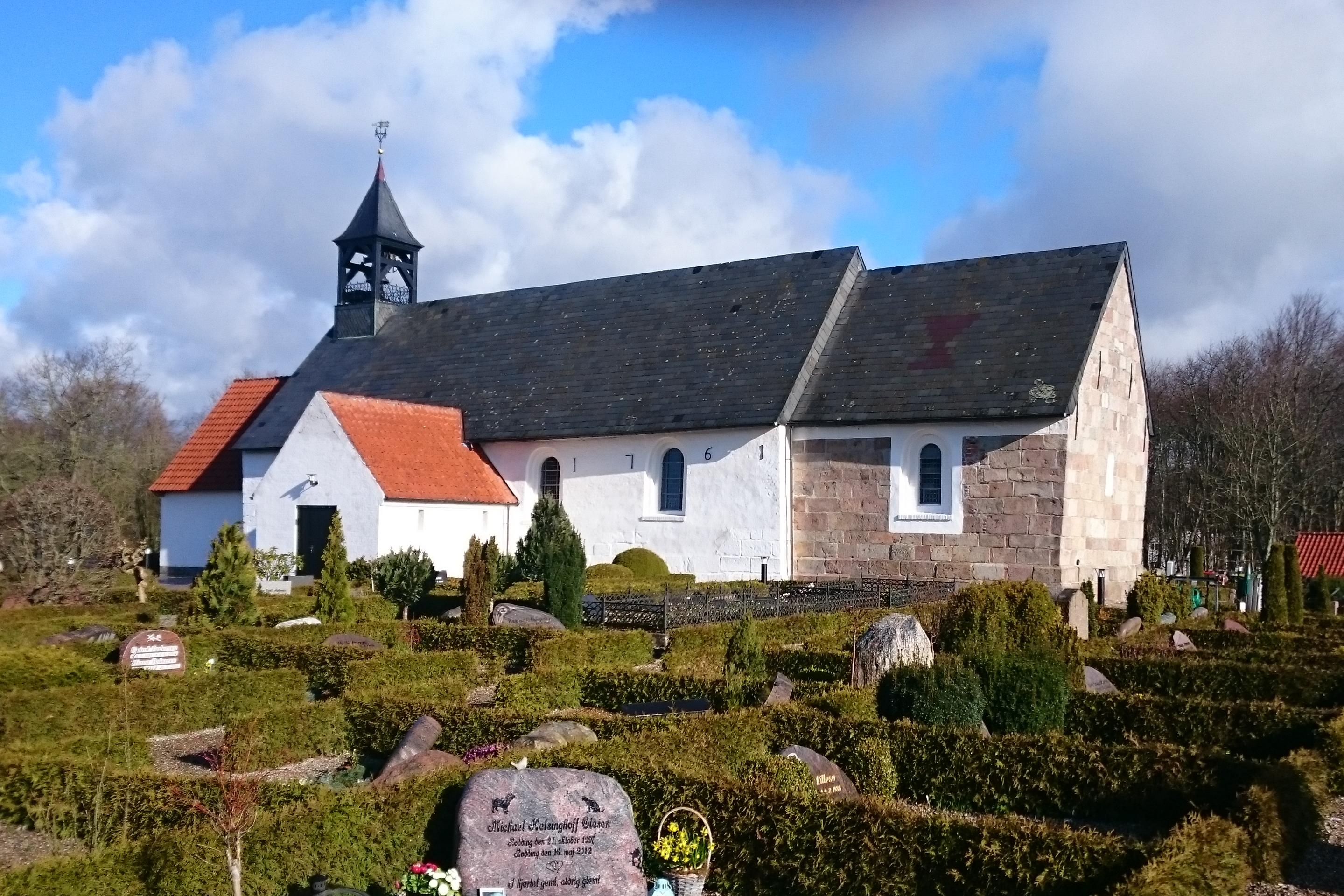
- Rødding Church

- The parish within Vejen Municipality
- Country: Denmark
- Region: Southern Denmark
- Municipality: Vejen Municipality
- Diocese: Ribe

Population (2025)
  - Total: 3,254

Rødding Parish (Danish: Rødding Sogn) is a parish in the Diocese of Ribe in Vejen Municipality, Denmark. Rødding Church is located in the town of Rødding.
