= Lauritz Petersen Aakjær =

Danish architect

Lauritz Petersen Aakjær (26 May 1883 – April 17, 1959) was a Danish architect in Jutland and exponent of the Heimatschutz style.

== Biography ==
Lauritz Petersen Aakjær was born in Vester Lindet near Gram, Denmark. He completed a basic architectural education at Baugewerkschule Eckernförde in Eckernförde. Employed by the architect H. W. Schmidt in Hamburg, he became an independent architect and master builder in Rødding in 1909, where the majority of his works are, including Rødding School (built in 1912). From 1920 to 1933 he designed 26 detached homes in Rødding and Gram, and two in Haderslev. One of his children, Svend Aage Aakjær, was also an architect.

== See also ==
- List of Danish architects
