= Skodborg =

Town in Denmark

- Town
- Location within Region of Southern Denmark Location within Denmark
- Coordinates: 55°25′8″N 9°9′2″E
- Country: Denmark
- Region: Southern Denmark
- Municipality: Vejen Municipality

Area
  - Urban: 1.3 km^{2} (0.50 sq mi)

Population (2026)
  - Urban: 1,233
  - Urban density: 950/km^{2} (2,500/sq mi)
- Time zone: UTC+1 (CET)
  - Summer (DST): UTC+2 (CEST)
- Postal code: DK-6630 Rødding

Skodborg is a small town, with a population of 1,233 (as of 1 January 2026), in Vejen Municipality, Region of Southern Denmark in Denmark.

Skodborg is located 29 km southwest of Kolding, 35 km northwest of Haderslev, 10 km northeast of Rødding and 9 km south of Vejen.

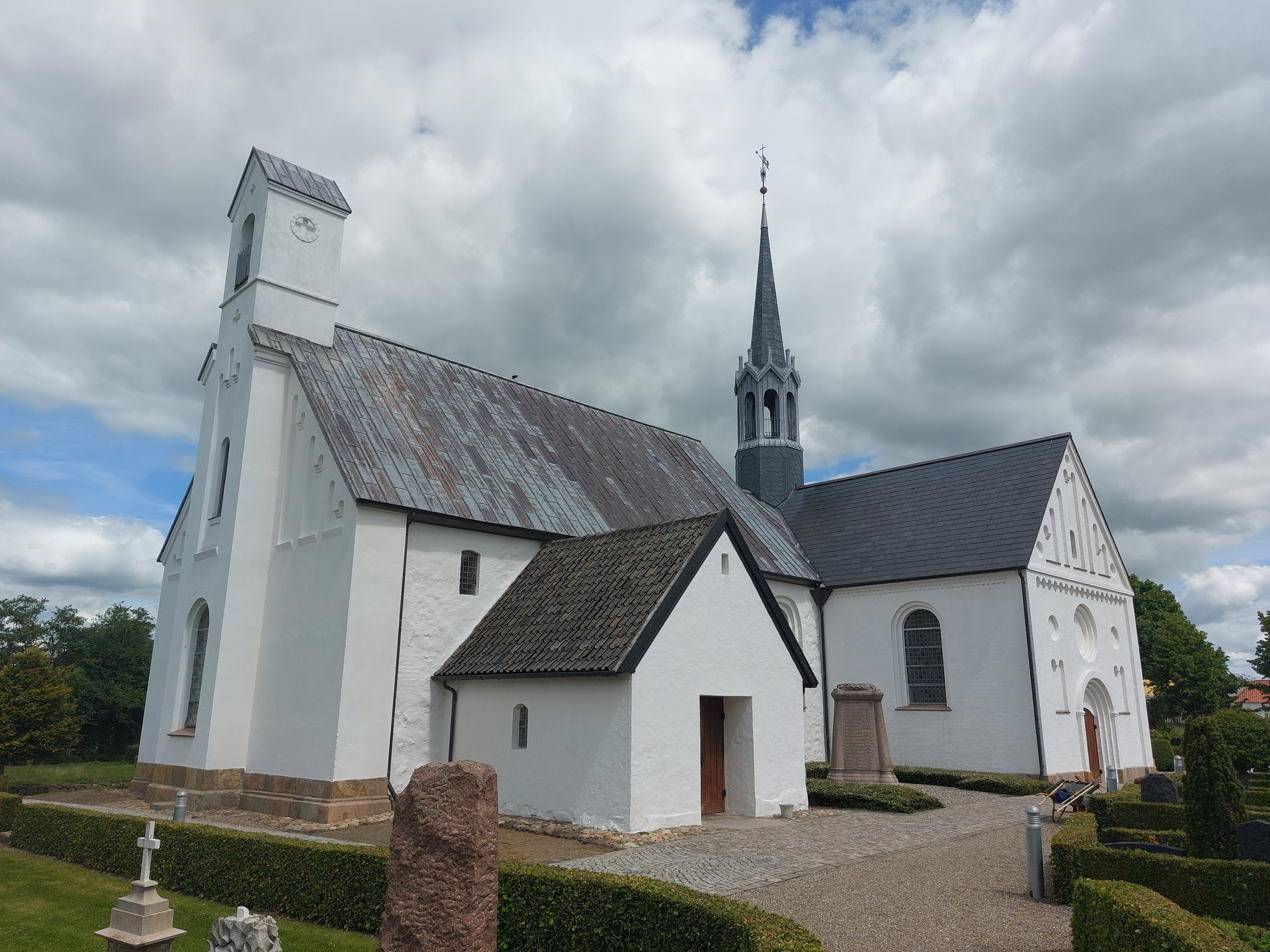
Skodborg Church

Skodborg Church is located in the town.
