= Askov, Denmark =

Town in Southern Denmark Region, Denmark

Askov
- Town
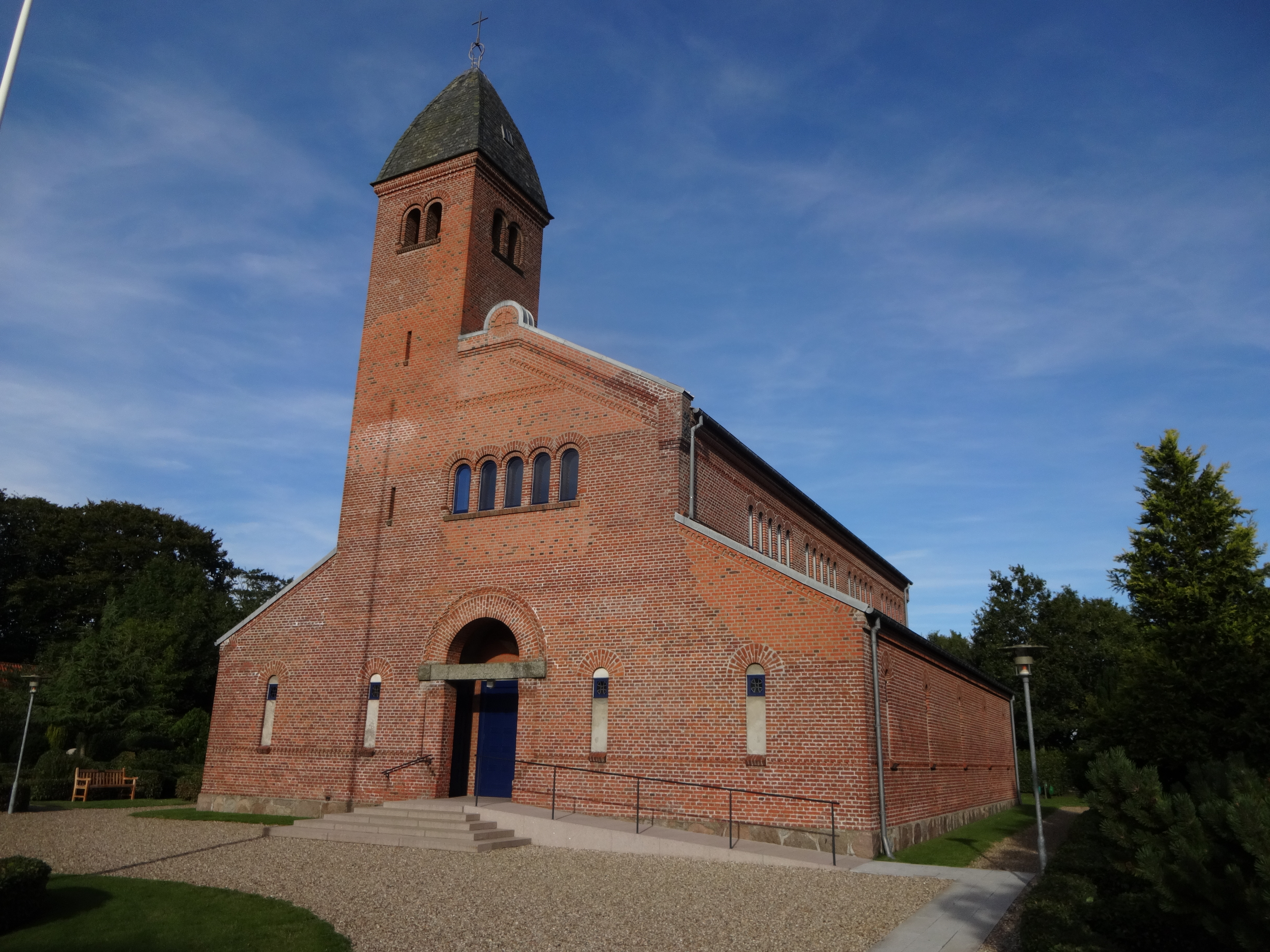
- Askov Church

- Location within Region of Southern Denmark Location within Denmark
- Coordinates: 55°28′20″N 9°5′40″E
- Country: Denmark
- Region: Syddanmark
- Municipality: Vejen Municipality

Area
  - Urban: 1.3 km^{2} (0.50 sq mi)

Population (2026)
  - Urban: 1,972
  - Urban density: 1,500/km^{2} (3,900/sq mi)
- Time zone: UTC+1 (CET)
  - Summer (DST): UTC+2 (CEST)
- Postal code: DK-6600 Vejen

Askov is a small town, with a population of 1,972 (1 January 2026), in Vejen Municipality, Southern Denmark Region in Denmark.

Askov is located just west of Vejen. The two towns are separated by a few hundred meters of open land and are connected by a combined road and bicycle path with street lights.

Askov Church and Askov Højskole are located in the town.

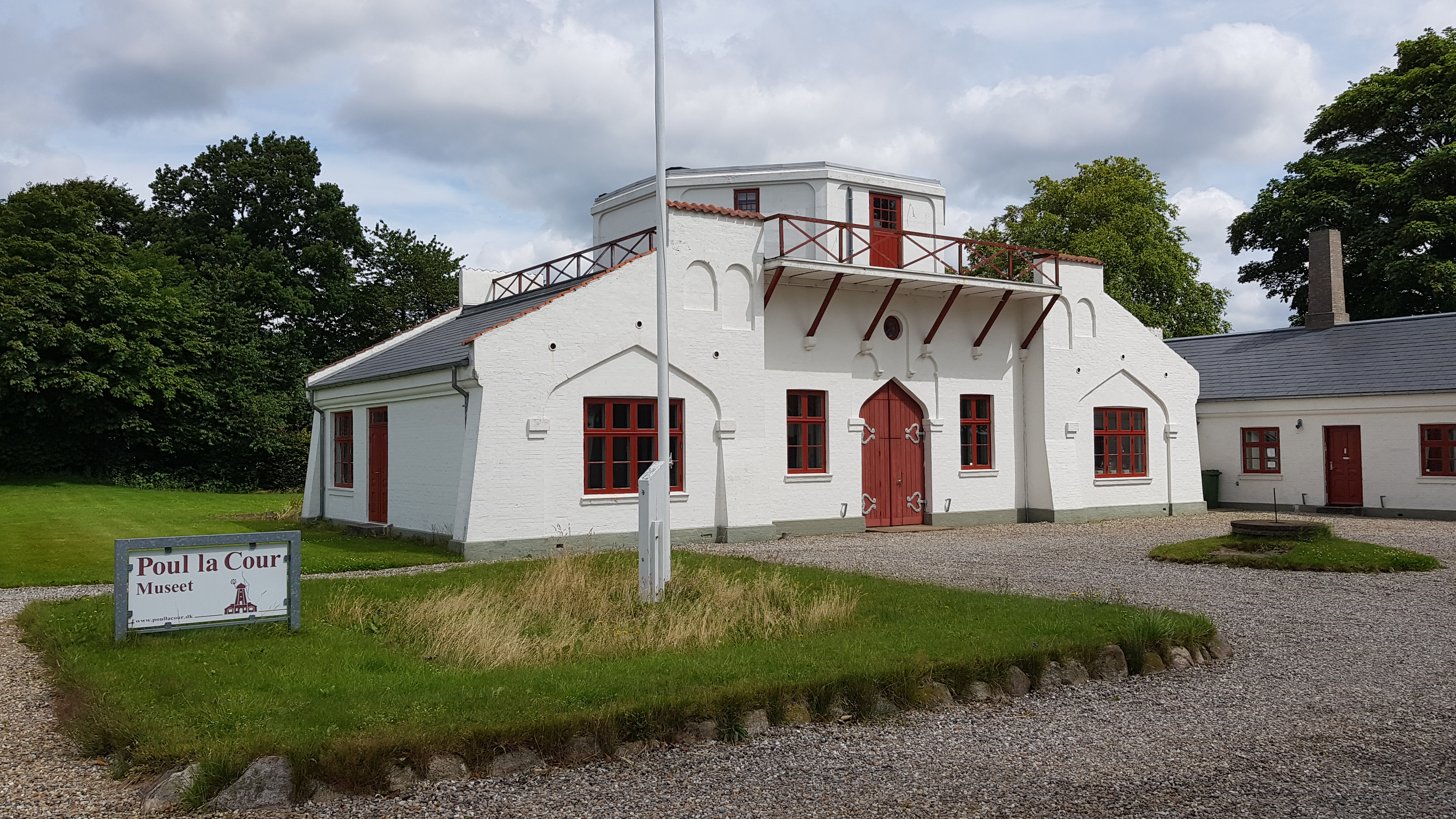
The Poul la Cour Museum in Askov

The Poul la Cour Museum, established in 2000, is located in the original laboratories of the inventor Poul la Cour.
