= Brørup =

- Town
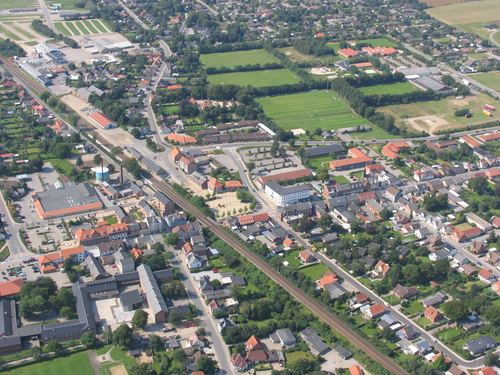
- Aerial photograph of Brørup

- Location in Denmark Brørup (Region of Southern Denmark)
- Coordinates: 55°28′57″N 9°0′57″E
- Country: Denmark
- Region: Southern Denmark
- Municipality: Vejen Municipality

Area
  - Urban: 4 km^{2} (1.5 sq mi)

Population (2026)
  - Urban: 4,596
  - Urban density: 1,100/km^{2} (3,000/sq mi)
  - Gender: 2,295 males and 2,301 females
- Time zone: UTC+1 (CET)
  - Summer (DST): UTC+2 (CEST)
- Postal code: DK-6650 Brørup

Brørup is a railway town, with a population of 4,596 (1 January 2026), in Vejen Municipality, Region of Southern Denmark, Denmark. It is located 10 km west of Vejen, 26 km northeast of Ribe, 33 km west of Kolding, 40 km south of Grindsted and 43 km east of Esbjerg.

Until 1 January 2007 Brørup was the seat of the former Brørup Municipality (Danish, kommune) in Ribe County.

== Churches ==
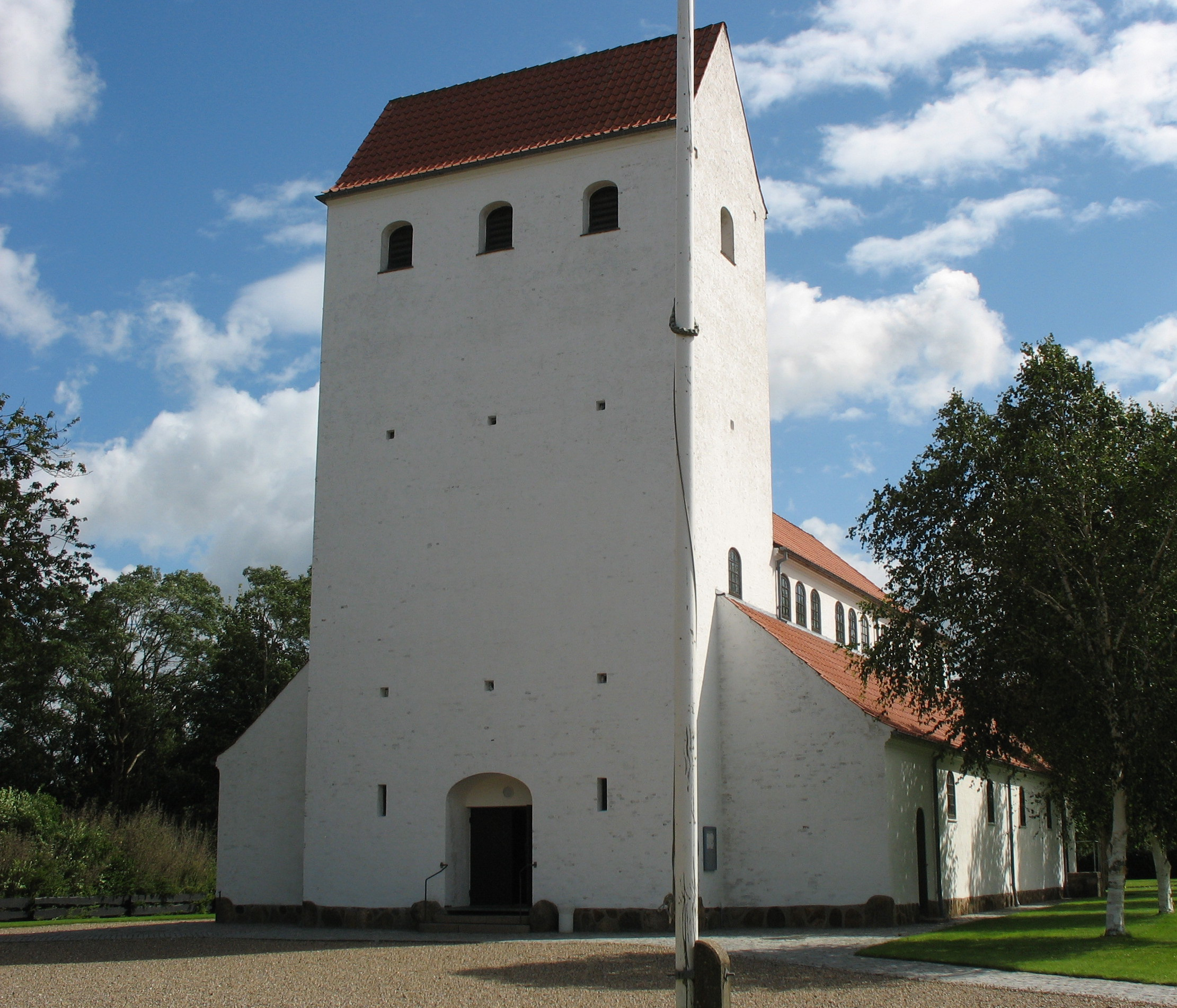
Johanneskirken (The Johannes Church)

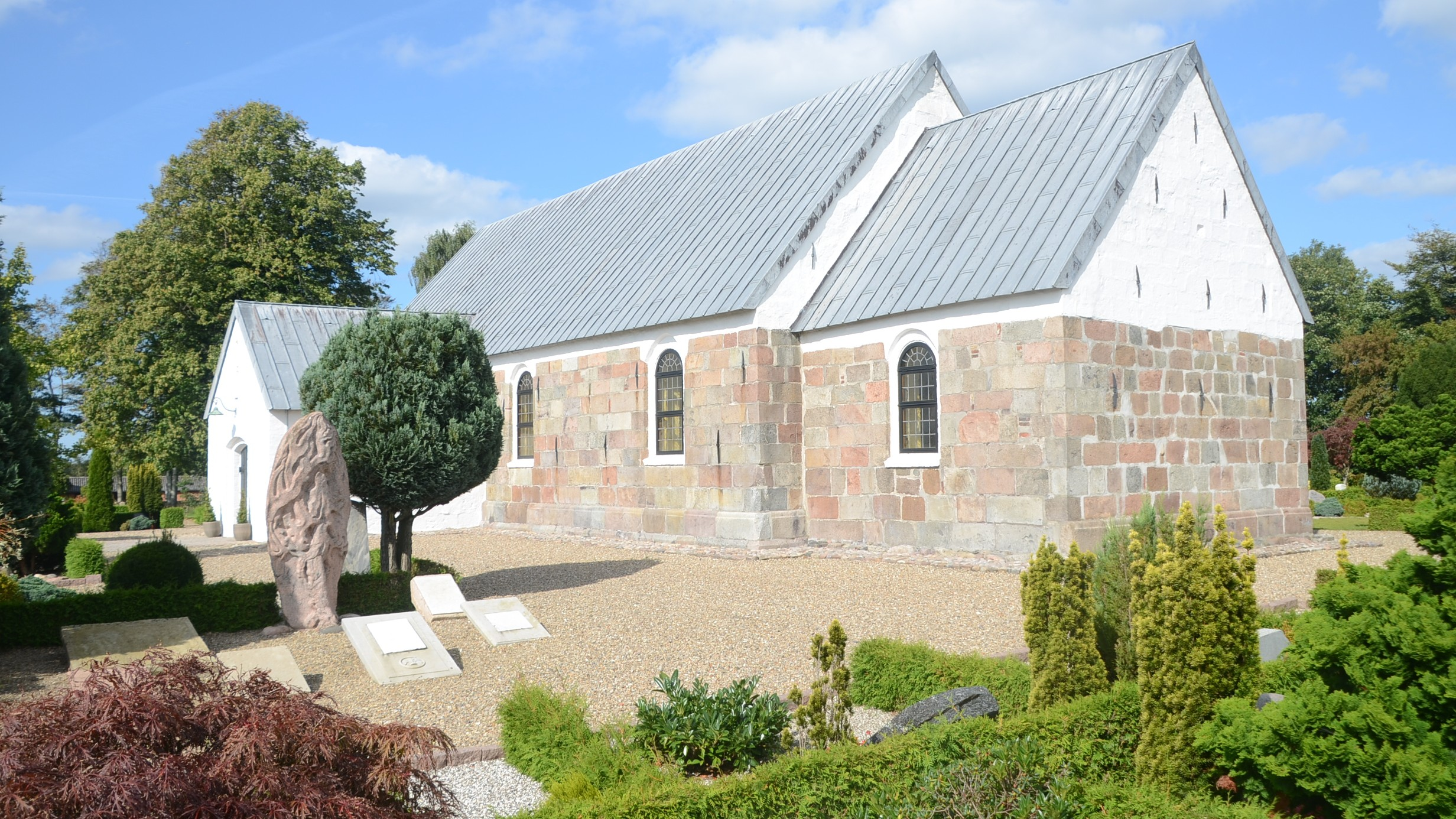
Brørup Gamle Kirke (Brørup Old Church)

There are two churches located in the Brørup area. Johanneskirken (The Johannes Church), built in 1925, is located in the railway town, and the medieval Brørup Gamle Kirke (Brørup Old Church) is located about 2 km northwest of the town.

== Brørup Market ==
Brørup Market is an auction of farm animals and a hawkers' market. It is held every Friday morning on the marketplace located in the western part of the town.

== Transportation ==
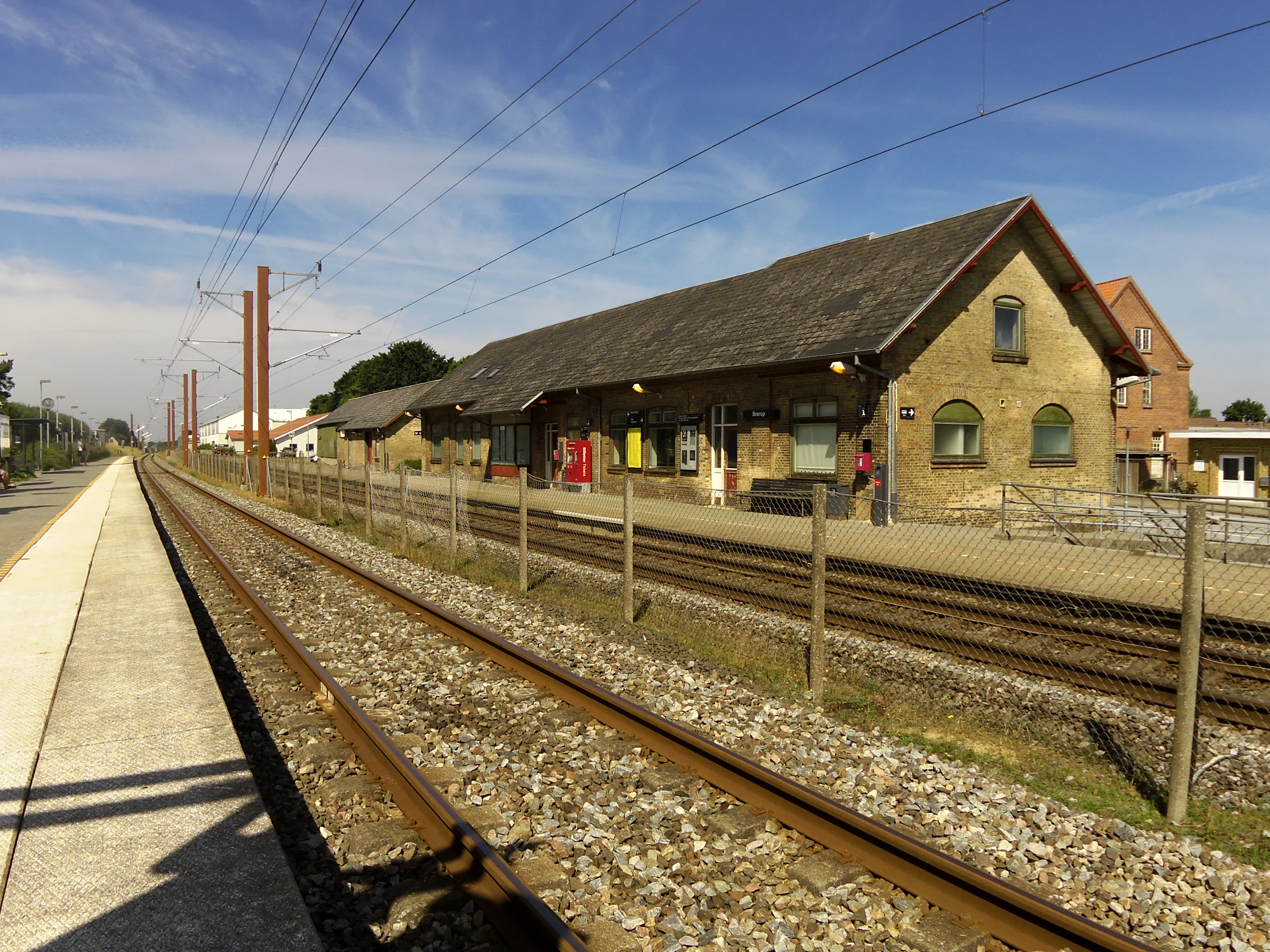
Brørup railway station

Brørup is served by Brørup railway station which is located on the Lunderskov–Esbjerg railway line.

== Brørup Municipality ==
The former Brørup Municipality covered an area of 107 km^{2}, and had a total population of 6,485 (2005). Its last mayor was Egon Fræhr, a member of the Venstre (Liberal Party) political party.

Brørup municipality ceased to exist as the result of Kommunalreformen ("The Municipality Reform" of 2007). It was merged with existing Holsted, Rødding, and Vejen municipalities to form the new Vejen municipality. This created a municipality with an area of 817 km^{2} and a total population of 41,350 (2005).

== Notable people ==
- Peter Graulund (born 1976 in Brørup) a retired Danish professional football player, over 100 Danish Superliga goals
- Christian Keller (born 1980 in Brørup) a retired Danish professional football player, over 400 club caps
- Mads Conrad-Petersen (born 1988 in Brørup) a Danish badminton player

== International relations ==
=== Twin towns — Sister cities ===
Brørup is twinned with:

- Brodnica, Poland

== See also ==
- Tirslund Rock
- Sønderskov
