= Store Andst =

- Village
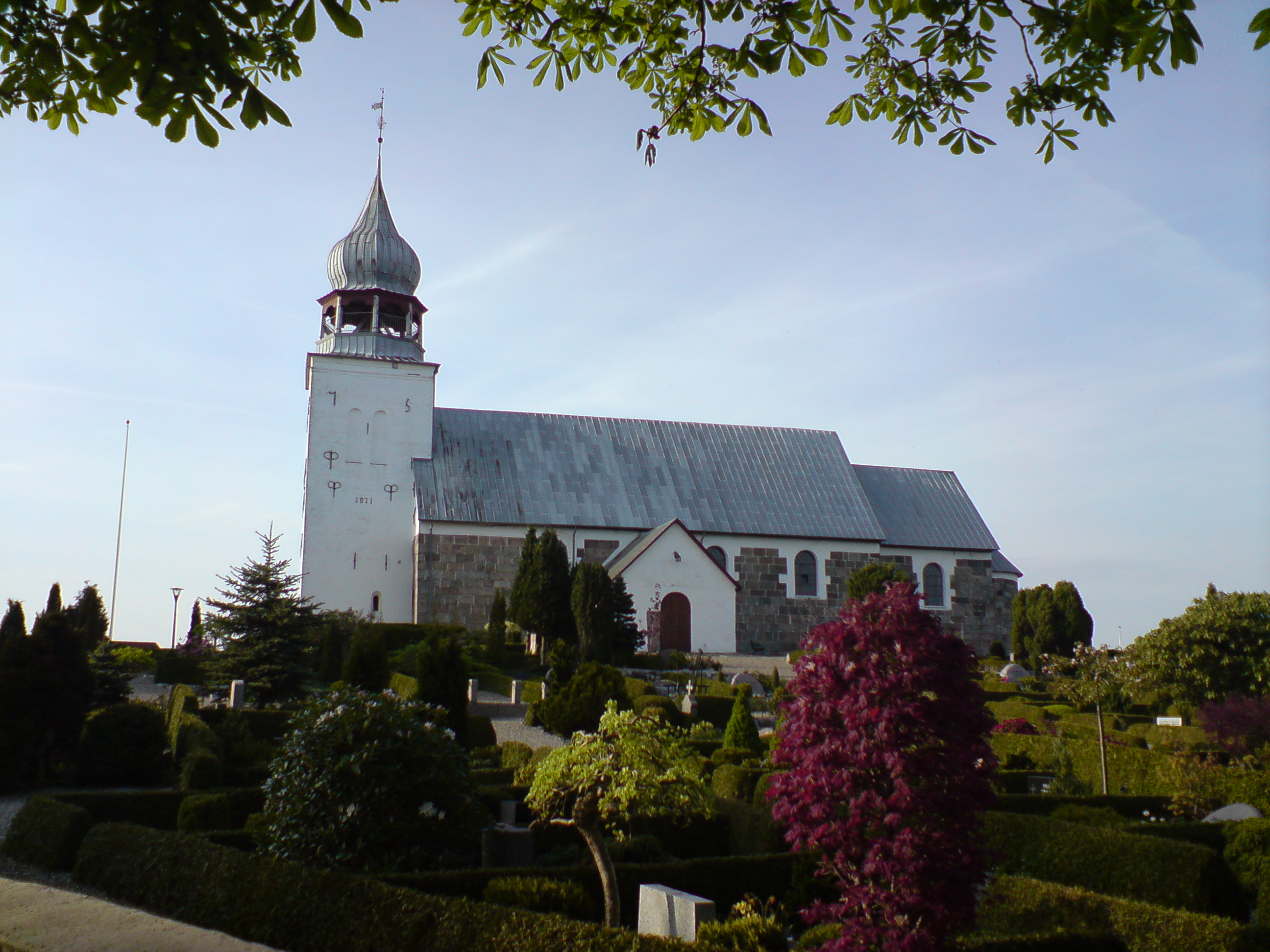
- Andst Church

- Location in Region of Southern Denmark Store Andst (Denmark)
- Coordinates: 55.48154°N 9.23446°E
- Country: Denmark
- Region: Southern Denmark (Syddanmark)
- Municipality: Vejen
- Established: 12th century

Population (2026)
  - Total: 775
- Time zone: UTC1
- Website: http://www.andst.info

Store Andst is a village in Vejen Municipality of Southern Jylland, Denmark with a population of 775 (1 January 2026).

Andst Church (Andst Kirke) is the parish church located on a hill in the middle of the village. The large granite square building probably dates from the last decades of the 12th century. In 1592 the tower was built with the peculiar onion spire. It was added to the church by Caspar Markdanner lensman at Koldinghus, at the request of parish priest Jon Jensen Kolding.

== Notable people ==
- Morten Pedersen Porsild (1872 in Glibstrup near Store Andst – 1956) Danish botanist who lived and worked most of his career in Greenland.
- Jon Jensen Kolding (d. 1609) Danish priest, historian and topographer.
