= Jels, Denmark =

Jels
- Town
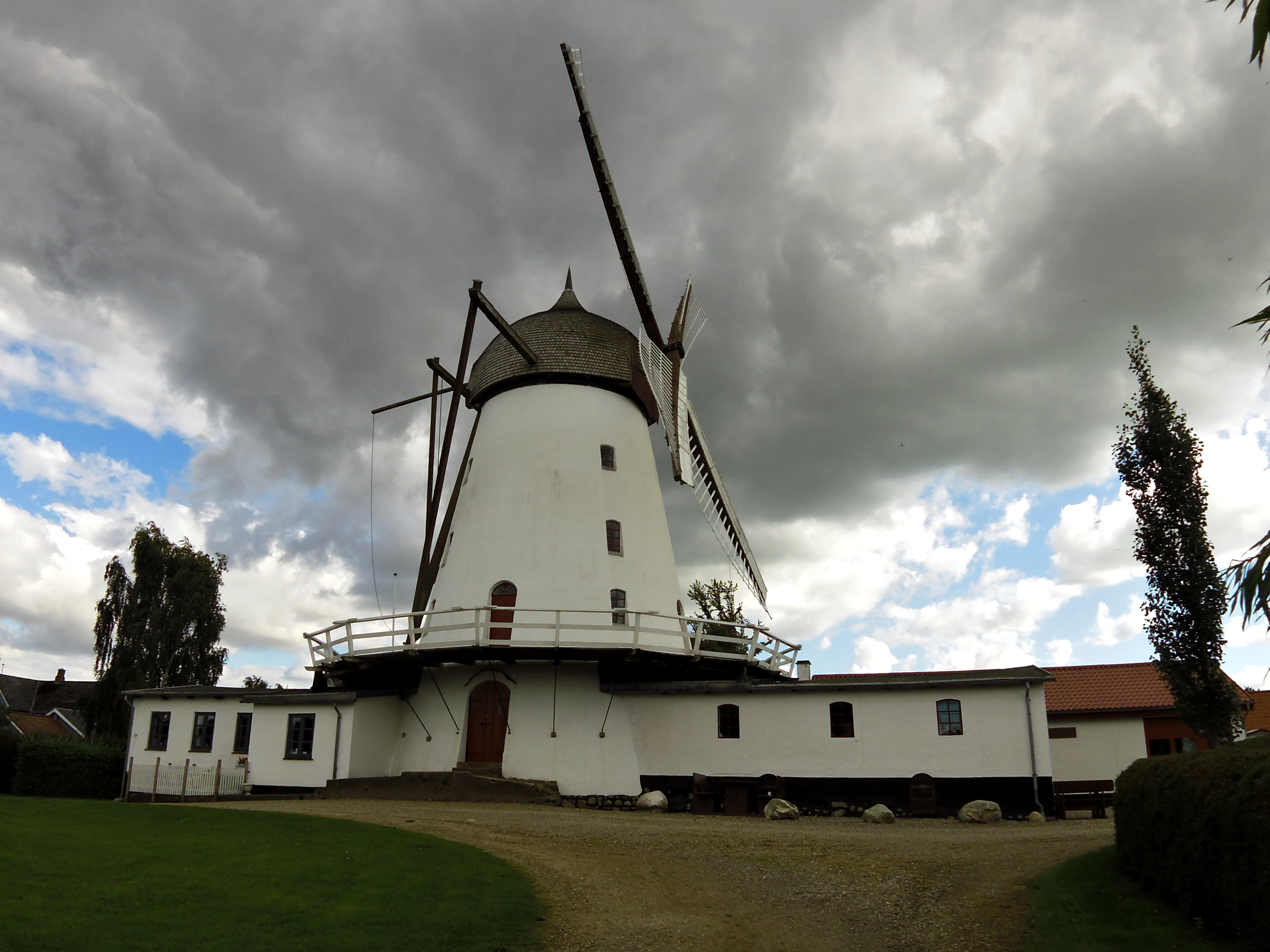
- Jels Mill

- Location in Denmark Jels (Region of Southern Denmark)
- Coordinates: 55°21′23″N 9°12′12″E
- Country: Denmark
- Region: Southern Denmark
- Municipality: Vejen Municipality

Area
  - Urban: 1.91 km^{2} (0.74 sq mi)

Population (2026)
  - Urban: 1,959
  - Urban density: 1,030/km^{2} (2,660/sq mi)
- Time zone: UTC+1 (CET)
  - Summer (DST): UTC+2 (CEST)
- Postal code: DK-6630 Rødding

Jels (German: Jels) is a town, with a population of 1,959 (1 January 2026), situated 17 km northwest of Vojens, 26 km southwest of Kolding, 30 km east of Ribe and 17 km south of Vejen. The town is a part of Vejen Municipality, Region of Southern Denmark in Denmark.

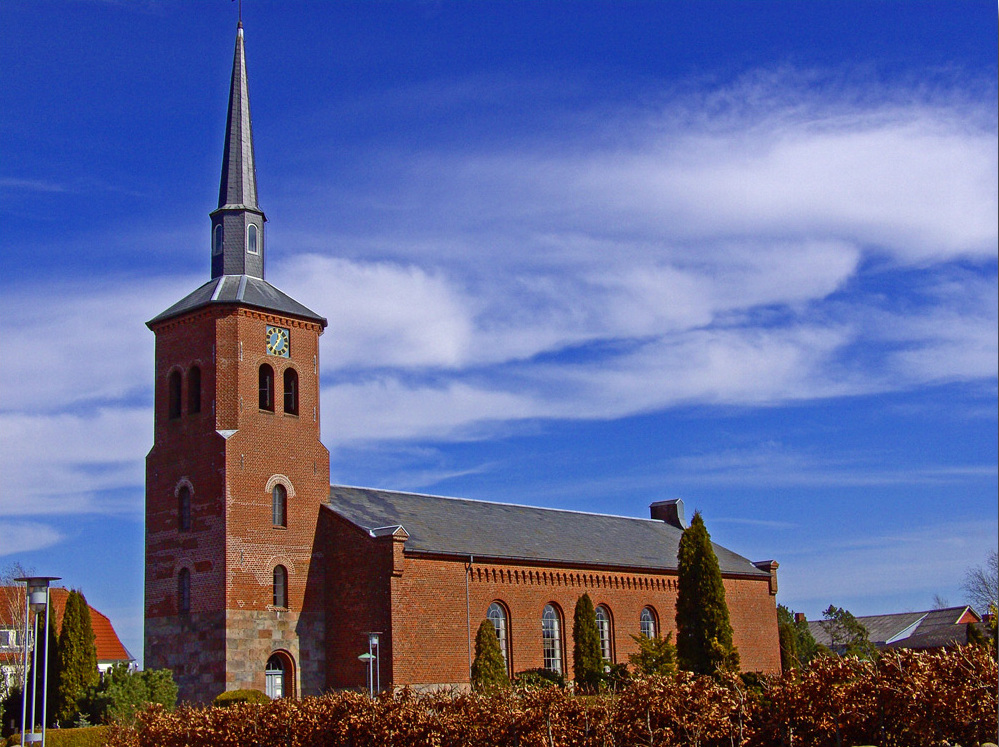
Jels Church

Jels Church is located in the town. It was consecrated in 1854, replacing a smaller somewhat dilapidated chapel of hewn granite.

== Geography ==
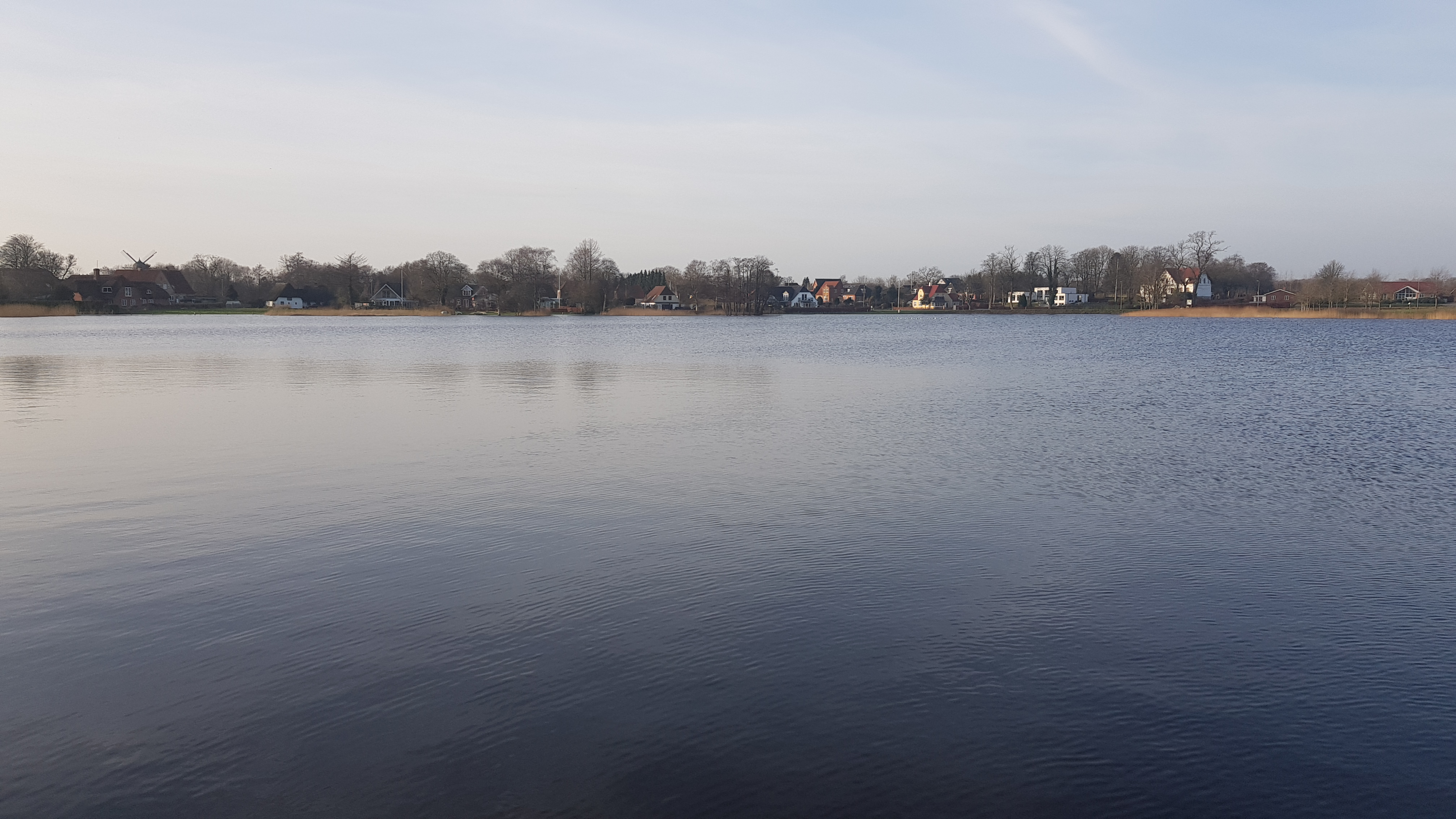
"Jels Nedersø", the southernmost of the Jels Lakes

The Jels Lakes are three lakes in a row located just northeast of the town: "Jels Nedersø", "Jels Midtsø" and "Jels Oversø". Together they form a small subglacial stream trench, which was created approx. 12,000 years ago during the latest glacial age. The forest area around Jels Nedersø is thought to be remains of the large Farris Skov (Farris Forest) which covered the area from the Little Belt to Ribe in ancient times.

== History ==
The oldest traces of the Hamburg culture in Scandinavia were found during an archeological excavation at Jels.

Jels Voldsted was an early medieval fortress, located at the western shore of Jels Midtsø. It is believed to have been a castle or fortress of significant size. Jels is located at Hærvejen, an important ancient trade road, and the traderoutes through the Farris Forest were controlled from the castle. It is believed that the castle burned to the ground in the 1420s and was never rebuilt. Jels was under German rule between 1864 and 1920, and Jels Voldsted became a gathering place for the Danish-minded citizens of the region, especially after the reunification with Denmark in 1920 and after the second world war.

Jels Mill is a Dutch-style smock windmill build in 1859. It was in use until 1959. The "Association for the Preservation of Jels Mill" is responsible for the upkeep and restoration of the mill, the associated warehouses and the miller's home.
