= Rødding =

Rødding Rödding (German)
- Town
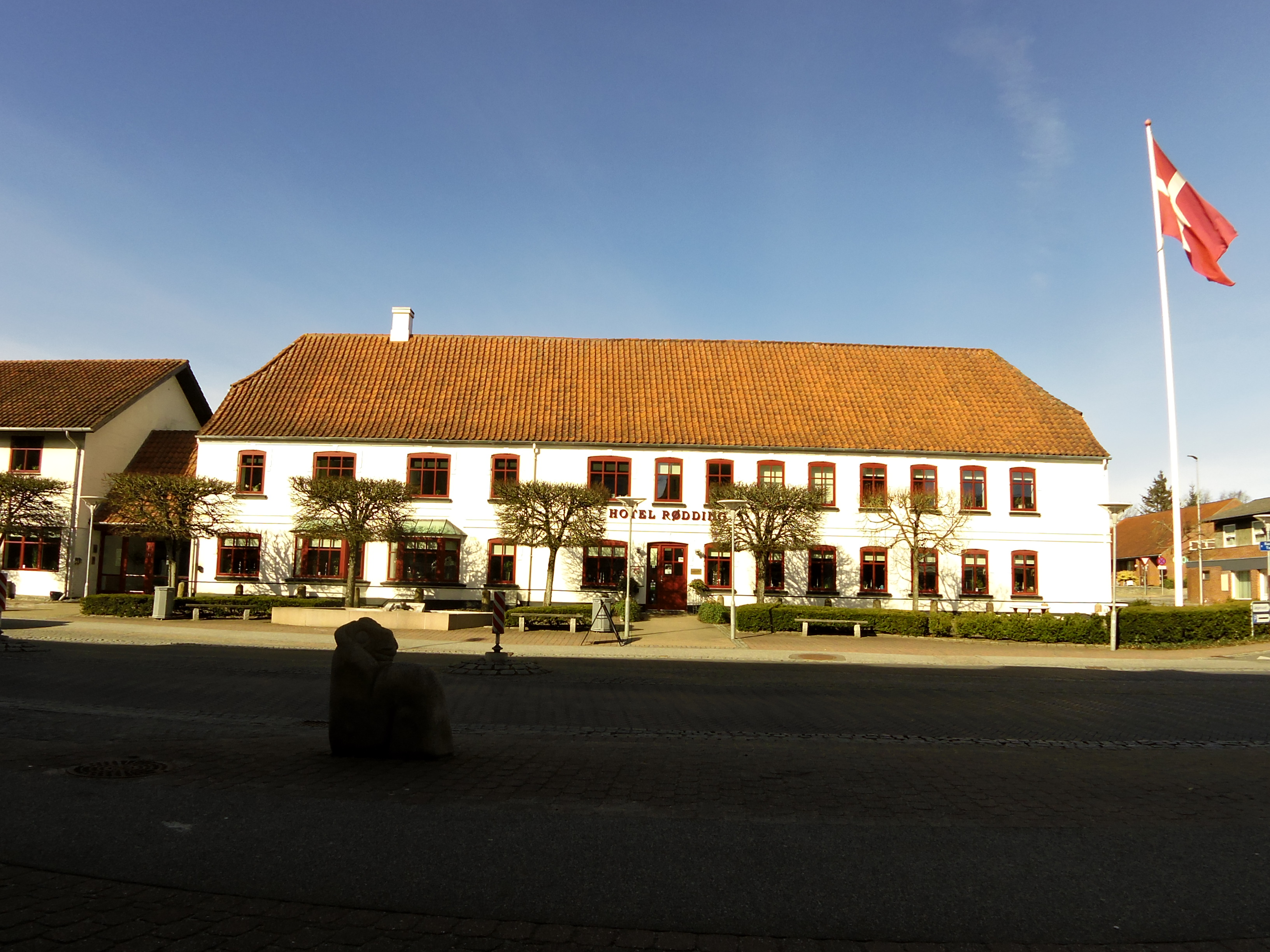
- Hotel Rødding

- Coat of arms

- Location of Rødding in Denmark Rødding (Region of Southern Denmark)
- Coordinates: 55°22′4″N 9°3′29″E
- Country: Denmark
- Region: Region of Southern Denmark
- Municipality: Vejen Municipality
- Parish: Rødding Parish
- Established: ca. 1000 B.C.

Area
  - Urban: 2.3 km^{2} (0.89 sq mi)

Population (2026)
  - Urban: 2,739
  - Urban density: 1,200/km^{2} (3,100/sq mi)
- Time zone: UTC+1
- Post code: DK-6630 Rødding

Rødding (German: Rödding) is a town with a population of 2,739 (1 January 2026) in Southern Denmark. It is located in Vejen municipality in Region of Southern Denmark on the Jutland peninsula.

== History ==
The area around Rødding was first inhabited around 3000 years ago, and was dotted with huts and burrows on the outskirts of the Farris Forest. The region was historically impoverished. This is evidenced by the city's original church which, due to the lack of resources at the time, is considerably smaller and simpler than many of the neighboring towns' churches.

In 1844 Rødding Højskole was built in the town. It was the first højskole, and remains the world's oldest folk high school.

In 1864, After the Battle of Dybbøl, Rødding came under Prussian control and the town became the seat of the northern region of Schleswig. Prussian rule put many restrictions on commercial trade which spurred agricultural development. The region was reunified with Denmark in 1920 after a popular vote.

Rødding municipality was created in 1970, and the region's eight parishes were merged. The town was the seat of the municipality (Danish, kommune), which covered an area of 273 km^{2}, and had a total population of 10,915 (2005). Its last mayor was Tage Sørensen, a member of the Venstre (Liberal Party) political party.

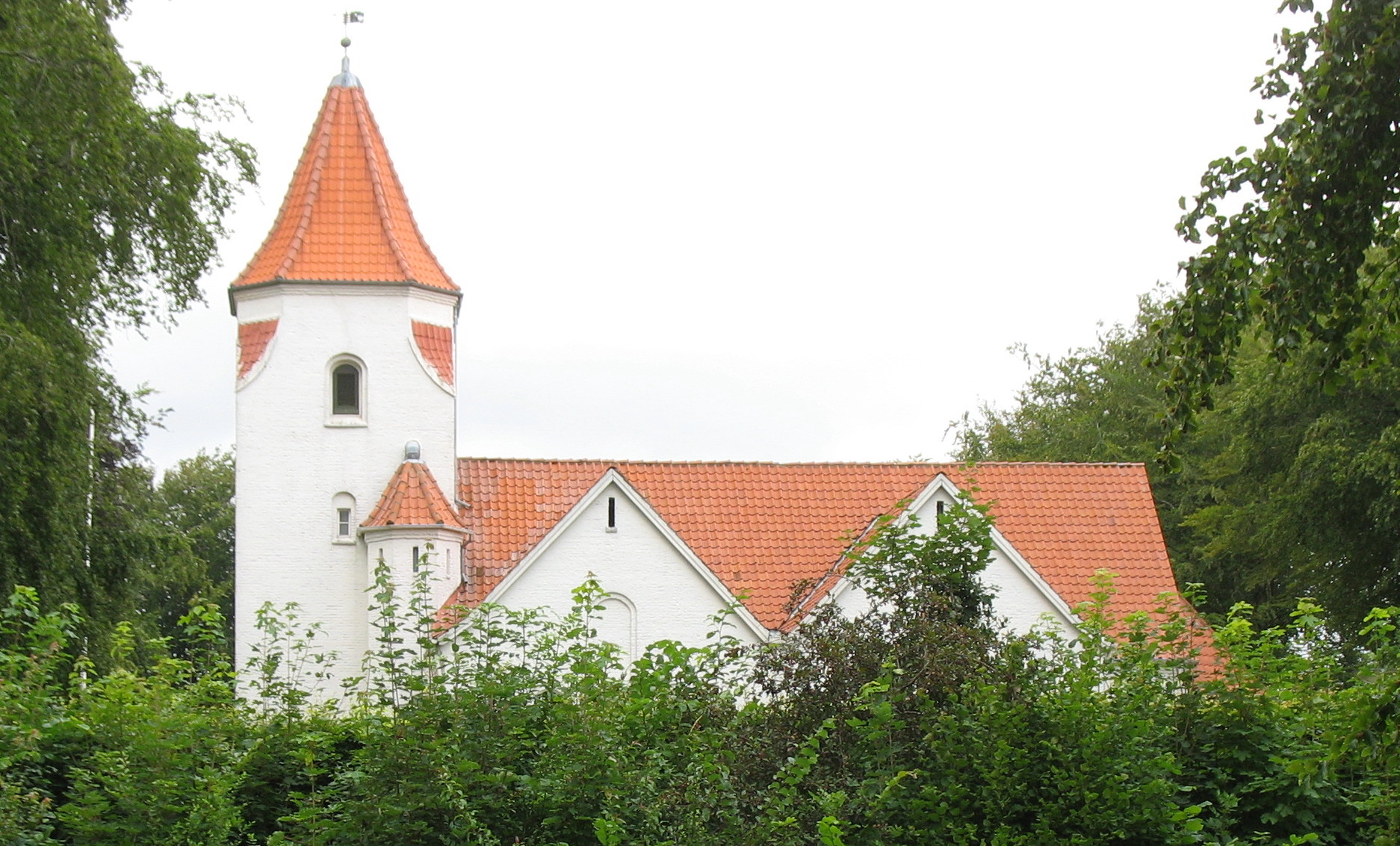
Rødding Frimenighedskirken

On 1 January 2007, Rødding municipality was dissolved as the result of Kommunalreformen ("The Municipality Reform" of 2007). It was merged with Brørup, Holsted, and Vejen municipalities to form the new Vejen municipality. This created a municipality with an area of 817 km^{2} and a total population of 41,350 (2005). The new municipality is part of the Region of Southern Denmark.

== Notable people ==
- Jakob Knudsen (1858 in Rødding – 1917) a Danish author, educator and clergyman
- Lauritz Petersen Aakjær (1883–1959) a Danish architect, in 1909 he became an independent architect and master builder in Rødding
- Fredrik Appel (1884 in Rødding – 1962) a Danish architect
- Karen Finch OBE (1921 in Rødding – 2018) a Danish-born British master weaver, conservator and educator
- Carl Holst (born 1970 in Rødding) a Danish politician and governor of Region of Southern Denmark since 2007
