= Vejen Municipality =

Vejen Municipality Vejen Kommune (Danish)
- Municipality
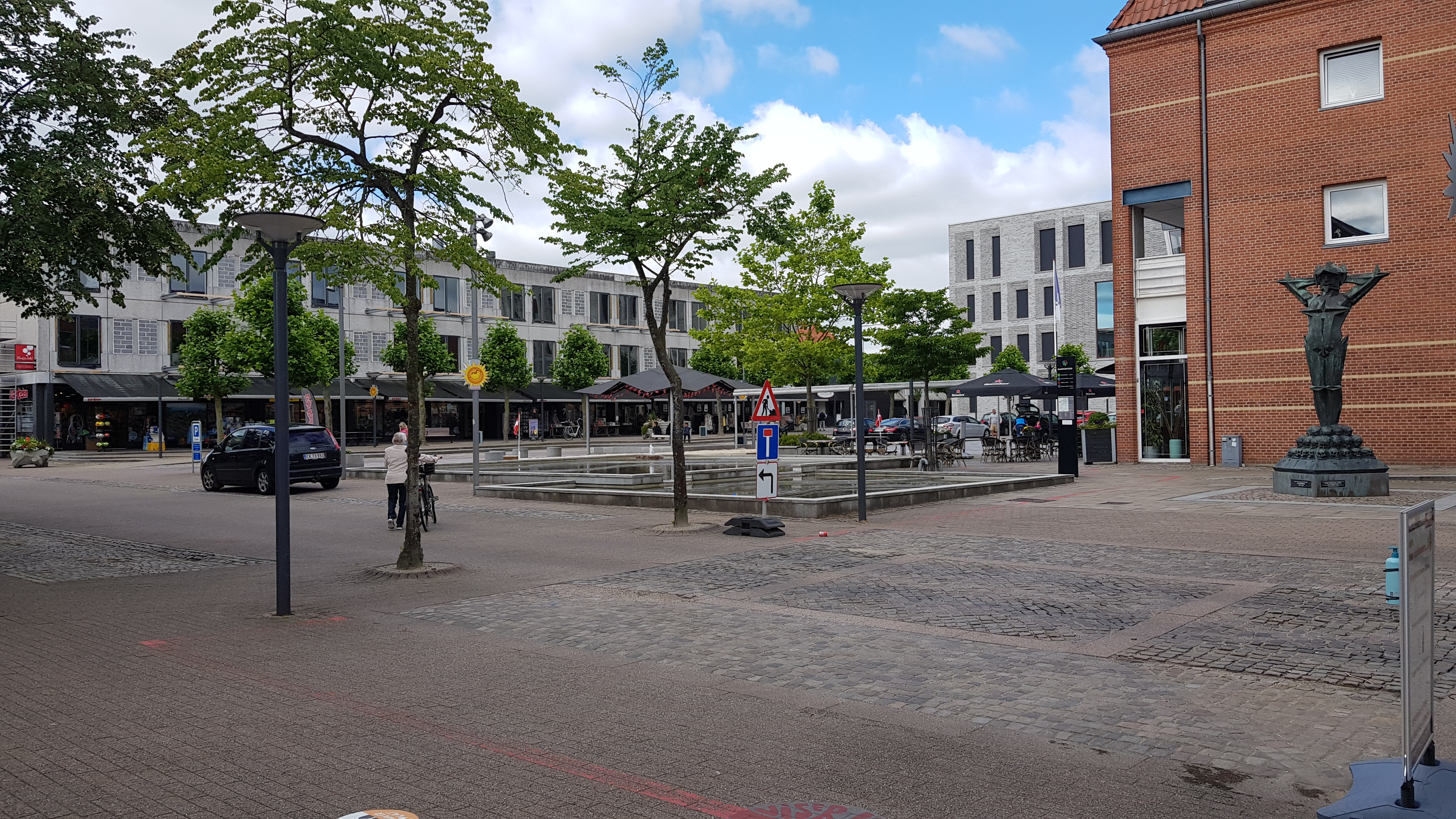

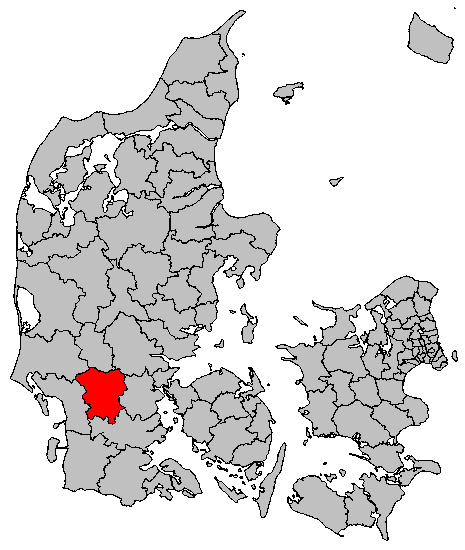
- Location in Denmark
- Coordinates: 55°29′00″N 9°09′00″E
- Country: Denmark
- Region: Southern Denmark
- Established: 1 January 2007

Government
  - Mayor: Christian Lund

Area
  - Total: 817 km^{2} (315 sq mi)

Population (1 January 2026)
  - Total: 42,641
  - Density: 52.2/km^{2} (135/sq mi)
- Time zone: UTC+1 (CET)
  - Summer (DST): UTC+2 (CEST)
- Postal code: 6600
- Website: vejen.dk

Vejen Municipality (Danish: Vejen Kommune) is a kommune in the Region of Southern Denmark on the Jutland peninsula in south Denmark. The municipality covers an area of 817 km^{2}, and has a total population of 42,641 (2026). Its mayor is Frank Schmidt-Hansen, representing the Conservative People's Party.

The municipality is part of Triangle Region and of the East Jutland metropolitan area, which had a total population of 1.378 million in 2016.

The main town and the site of its municipal council is the town of Vejen. One of the attractions of the area is the Vejen Art Museum.

== History ==
On 1 January 2007 Vejen municipality was, as the result of Kommunalreformen ("The Municipal Reform" of 2007), merged with Brørup, Holsted, and Rødding municipalities to form an enlarged Vejen municipality.

== Locations in Vejen Municipality ==
Vejen	9,800
Brørup	4,500
Holsted	3,100
Rødding	2,600
Jels	2,000
Askov	1,900
Skodborg	1,300
Bække	1,000
Gesten	950
Store Andst	800

== Politics ==
Vejen's municipal council consists of 27 members, elected every four years. The municipal council has nine political committees.

=== Municipal council ===
Below are the municipal councils elected since the Municipal Reform of 2007.

Election	Party										Total seats	Turnout	Elected mayor
Election	A	C	D	F	I	L	L	O	V	Ø	Total seats	Turnout	Elected mayor
2005	8	2		1		1		1	14		27	70.4%	Egon Fræhr (V)
2009	8	4		2				2	11		27	67.2%	Egon Fræhr (V)
2013	6	4		1	1			3	12		27	72.5%	Egon Fræhr (V)
2017	8	4		1	1			2	10	1	27	71.9%	Egon Fræhr (V)
2021	8	6	1	1			1	1	9		27	68.3%	Frank Schmidt-Hansen (C)
Data from Kmdvalg.dk 2005, 2009, 2013, 2017 and 2021

== Sources ==
- Municipal statistics: NetBorger Kommunefakta, delivered from KMD aka Kommunedata (Municipal Data)
- Municipal mergers and neighbors: Eniro new municipalities map
