= Wilhelm Wanscher =

Danish paper merchant and art collector

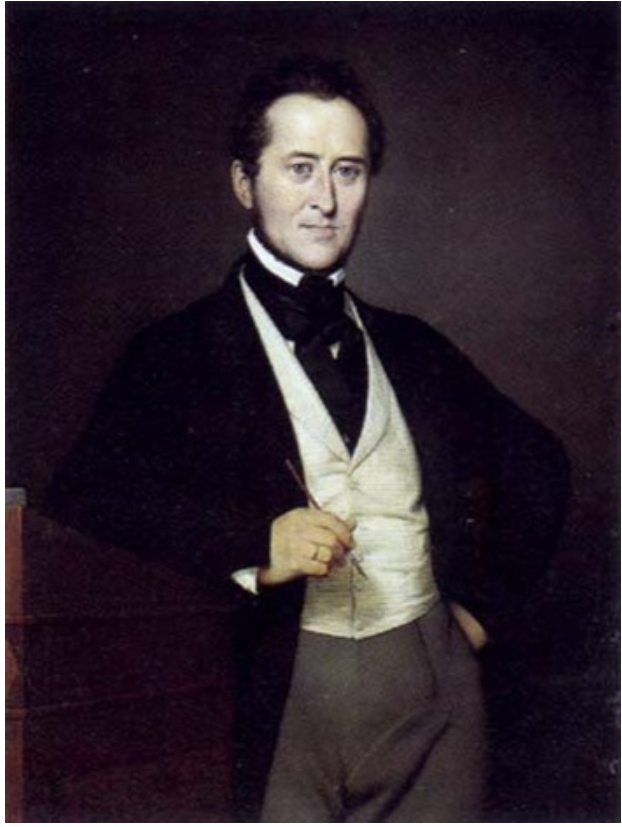
- Wanscher painted by Wilhelm Marstrand, 1855.
- Born: 21 April 1802; Copenhagen, Denmark
- Died: 4 December 1882 (aged 80); Copenhagen, Denmark
- Citizenship: Danish
- Occupation: Businessman
- Known for: Art collection and Søren Kierkegaard associations

Wilhelm Wanscer (21 April 1802 – 4 December 1882) was a Danish paper merchant and art collector, remembered above all for his associations with the philosopher Søren Kirkegård and some of the leading Danish Golden Age artists. He was the father of surgeon Oscar Wanscher and industrialist Axel Wanscher, grandfather of art historian Vilhelm Wanscher and great-grandfather of the designer Ole Wanscher.

== Early life and education ==
Wanscher was born on 21 April 1802 in Copenhagen, the son of Christopher Wanscher (1659–1841) and Karen Smidt (1867–1841). His father was a paper merchant based in Gothersgade.

== Career ==
Wanscher was licensed as a wholesale merchant (grosserer) in 1833 and started his own business the same year. It was based in the old Weisenhuset building at Købmagergade 44 (then Rosenborg Quarter, No. 6). He was the first external distributor of paper products from Strandmøllen north of Copenhagen. He was one of the largest suppliers of paper products to the Danish state. His other customers included the newspaper Adresseavisen and the book printer Bianco Luno.

== Personal life ==
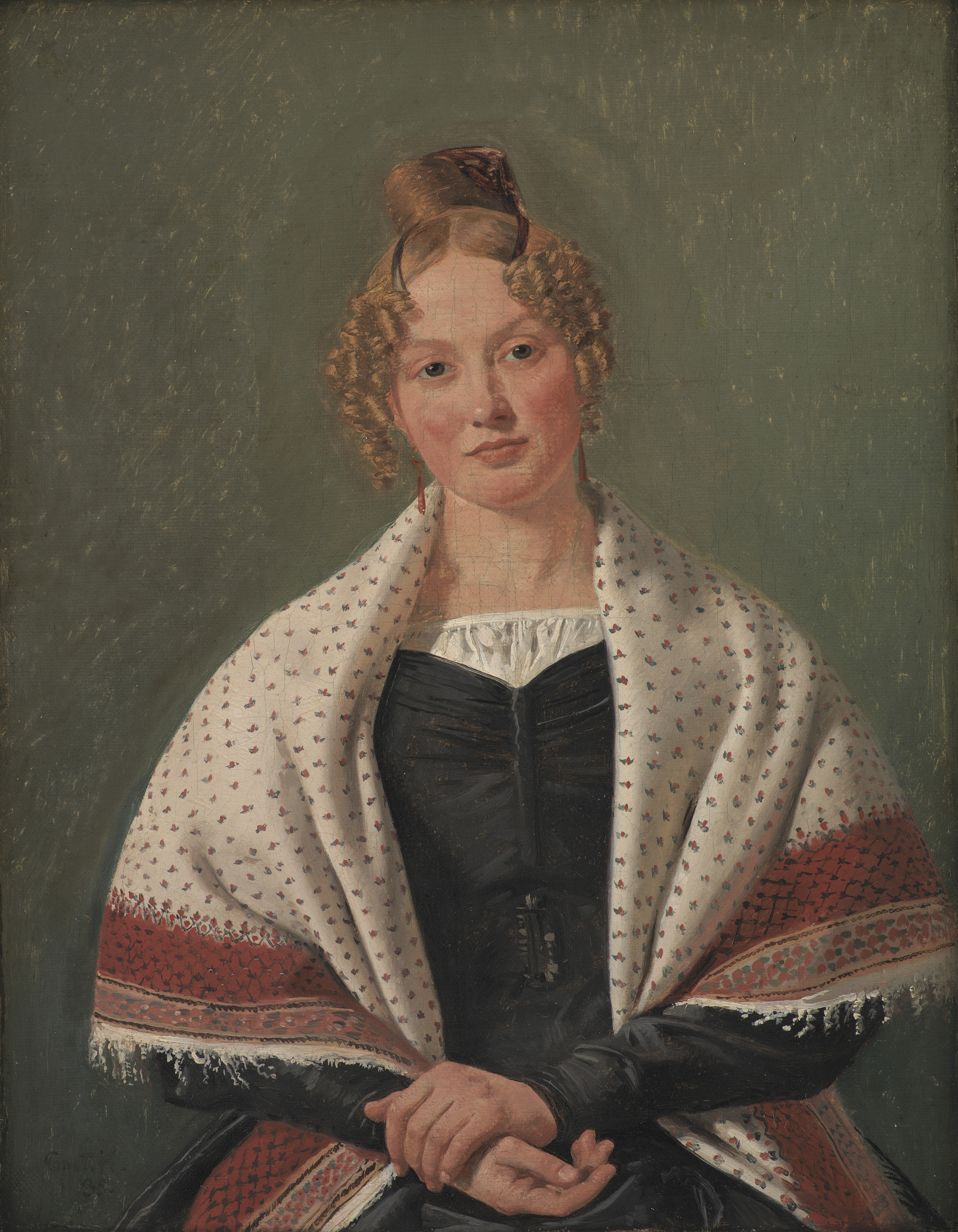
Hanne Wanscher, née Wegener

Wanscher married Karen Johanne Juliane Wegener (1816–1879) on 19 May 1834 in Værløse Church. She was the daughter of educator Jens Ernst Wegener and Birgitte Marie Bindesbøll. Her maternal uncle was the architect Gottlieb Bindesbøll. Wanscher was the owner of a substantial art collection. A number of the leading painters of the time, including Constantin Hansen, Jørgen Roed and Wilhelm Marstrand, frequently visited his home.

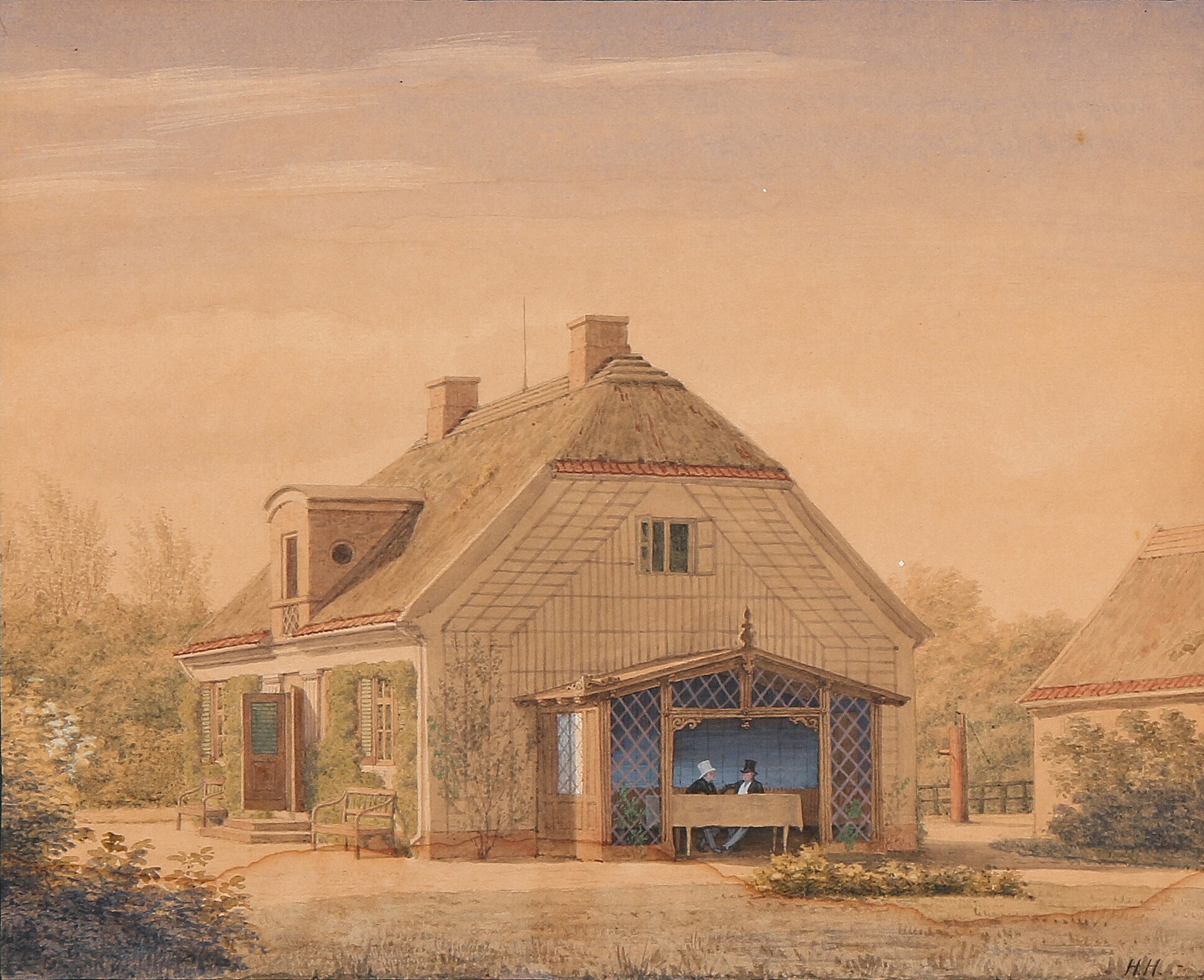
Wanscher's country house in Hellerup

He also had a friendly relation with the philosopher Søren Kierkegaard. He was introduced to him by Kierkegaard's cousin (and his own neighbor, Rosenborg Quarter No. 7), Johan Christian Lund (1799–1875), a silk merchant and politician, from whom he rented the country house Tolvkanten north of Copenhagen. A few years later Wanscher had his own country house built in Hellerup. In the early 1850s, he also bought a piece of land on Gammel Kongevej from Bianco Luno, formerly part of Luno's Christianshvile estate, and used it for the construction of an imposing apartment building.

== Death and legacy ==
Wanscher died on 4 December 1882. The funeral took place on 9 December in the Church of the Holy Ghost. His art collection was sold at auction after his death. He was survived by seven of his children:

- Karen Johanne Marie Wanscher (1836–1912)
- Nanna Wanscher (1838–1915), was married to Carl Alexis Henrik Bernhard Videbech
- Wilhelmine Wanscher (1840–1892), was married to Hans Wilhelm Berg
- Wilhelm Wanscher (1842–1901)
- Helene Wanscher (1844–1912)
- Oscar Wanscher (1846–1906) was a prominent surgeon. He was married to Johanne Margrethe, daughter of Christopher Hage.
- Axel Wanscher (1848–1877) was a prominent industrialist. He was married to Arngoth Dorothea Petronella Christine Laub (cousin of Thomas Laub) and the father of art historian Vilhelm Wanscher, grandfather of designer Ole Wanscher.

Wanscher's building on Gammel Kongevej (today Gammel Kongevej 137B-D) is now hidden from the street by a newer apartment building, Fammel Kongevej 136–38, constructed by Albert Nicolai Schioldann in 1855.

In 1912, Nanna Wanscher published her childhood memoirs as Minder fra min barndom og ungdom.

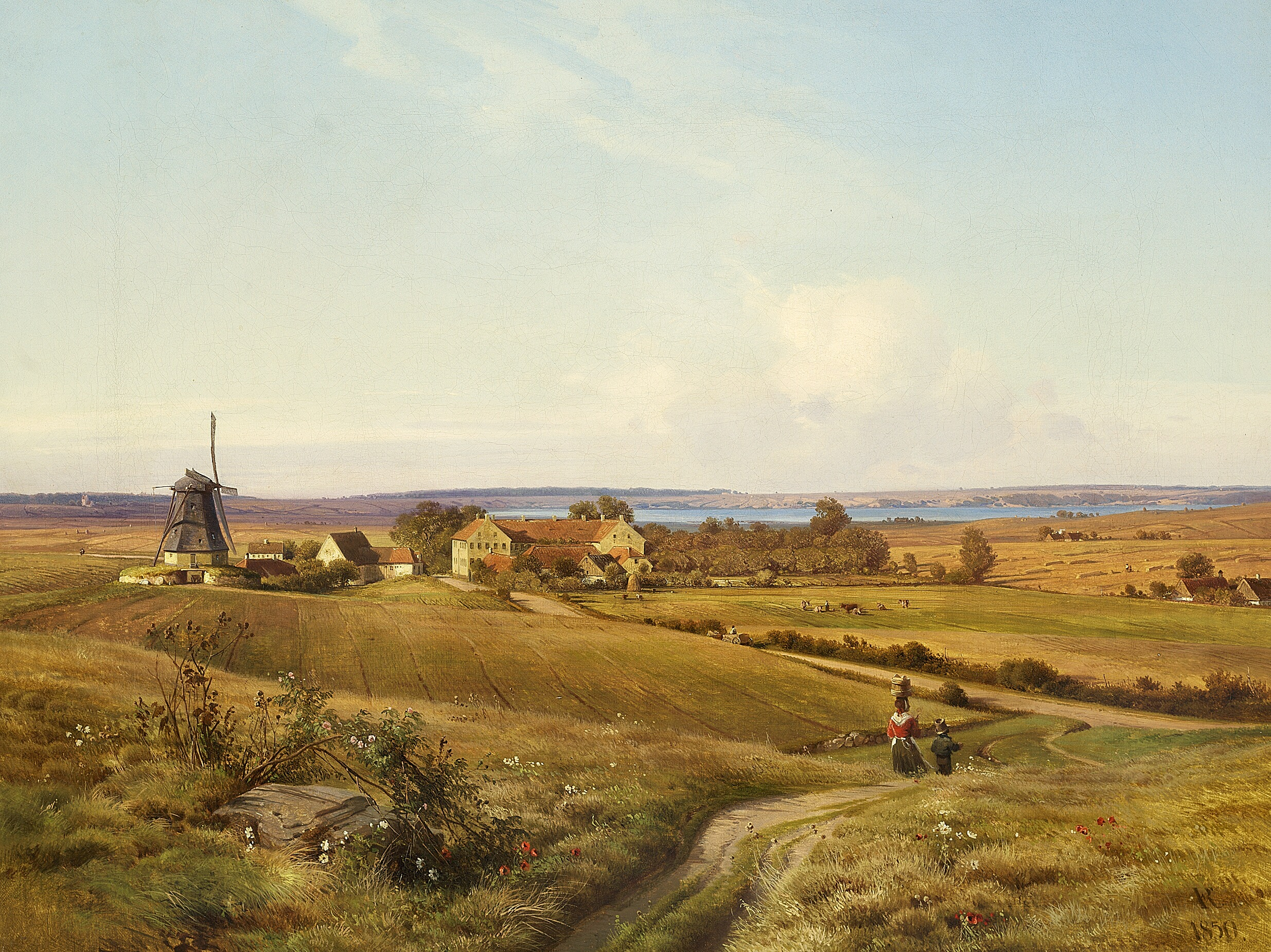
Painting from Eanscher's collection: Frederik Rodhe's View of Joenstrup Seminarium. Wanscher's father-in-law was headmaster of the institution.

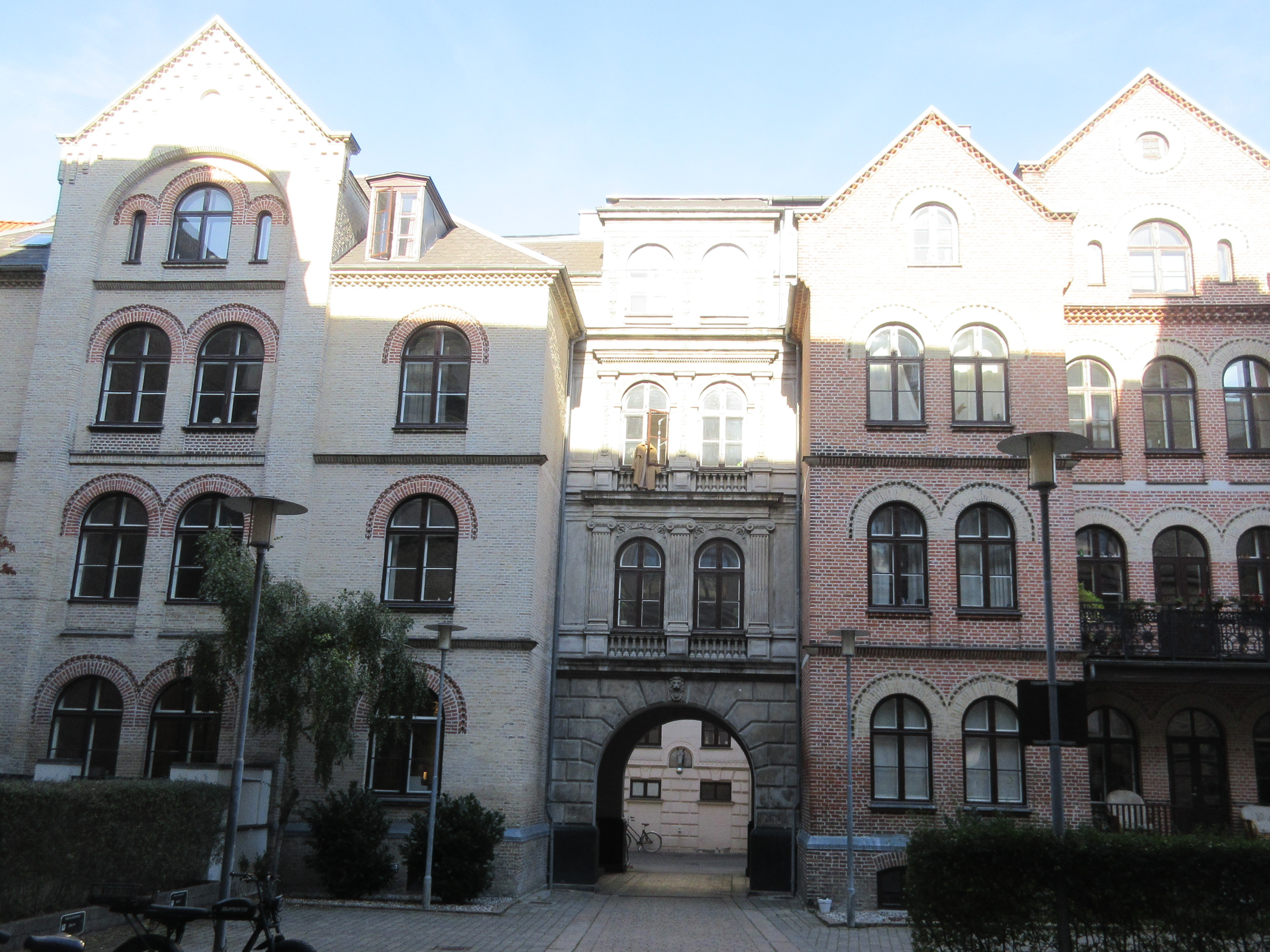
Wilhelm Wanscher's building on Gammel Kongevej
