= 2025 Frederiksberg municipal election =

Municipal election in Denmark

- 18 November 2025

All 31 seats to the Frederiksberg municipal council 16 seats needed for a majority
- Turnout: 63,781 (73.2%) ▼0.1%
	First party	Second party	Third party
	C	A	Ø
Party	Conservatives	Social Democrats	Red-Green Alliance
Last election	13 seats, 40.3%	5 seats, 17.1%	6 seats, 17.5%
Seats won	11	7	5
Seat change	▼2	▲2	▼1
Popular vote	21,238	13,065	9,969
Percentage	33.7%	20.7%	15.8%
Swing	▼6.6%	▲3.7%	▼1.7%
	Fourth party	Fifth party	Sixth party
	B	F	V
Party	Social Liberals	Green Left	Venstre
Last election	3 seats, 9.3%	1 seat, 4.7%	1 seat, 5.9%
Seats won	3	2	2
Seat change	0	▲1	▲1
Popular vote	5,728	5,020	3,127
Percentage	9.1%	8.0%	5.0%
Swing	▼0.2%	▲3.3%	▼0.9%
	Seventh party
	I
Party	Liberal Alliance
Last election	0 seats, 1.3%
Seats won	1
Seat change	▲1
Popular vote	1,740
Percentage	2.8%
Swing	▲1.5%
Mayor before election
Michael Vindfeldt
Social Democrats
Mayor after election
Michael Vindfeldt
Social Democrats

The 2025 Frederiksberg Municipal election was held on November 18, 2025, to elect the 31 members to sit in the regional council for the Frederiksberg Municipal council, in the Danish municipality of Frederiksberg, for the period 2026 to 2029. Michael Vindfeldt from the Social Democrats, would secure re-election.

== Background ==
Following the 2021 election, Michael Vinfeldt from Social Democrats became mayor for his first term, breaking 112 years of the position being held by the Conservatives. He would run for a second term.

For the second election in a row, the council increased its size, having to elect 31 councillors, compared to 29 in 2021.

Actor Bjarne Henriksen would run for the Social Democrats. He would be elected into the council.

=== 2021 Election results and notional results with 31 seats contested ===
Parties	Vote		Seats		
Parties	Votes	%	Actual Seats	Notional Seats	+ / -
Conservatives	24,607	40.3	13	13	0
Red–Green Alliance	10,720	17.6	6	6	0
Social Democrats	10,418	17.0	5	6	+1
Social Liberals	5,686	9.3	3	3	0
Venstre	3,603	5.9	1	2	+1
Green Left	2,852	4.7	1	1	0
Total	61,100	100.0	29	31	+2

== Electoral system ==
For elections to Danish municipalities, a number varying from 9 to 31 are chosen to be elected to the municipal council. The seats are then allocated using the D'Hondt method and a closed list proportional representation. Frederiksberg Municipality had 31 seats in 2025.

== Electoral alliances ==
=== Electoral Alliance 1 ===
Party		Political alignment
A	Social Democrats	Centre-left
B	Social Liberals	Centre to Centre-left
F	Green Left	Centre-left to Left-wing
Ø	Red-Green Alliance	Left-wing to Far-Left
Å	The Alternative	Centre-left to Left-wing

=== Electoral Alliance 2 ===
Party		Political alignment
C	Conservatives	Centre-right
E	Hvid-sten Frederiksbergs uafhængige Borgerliste	Local politics
K	Christian Democrats	Centre to Centre-right
T	Borgernes Frederiksberg	Local politics
Æ	Denmark Democrats	Right-wing to Far-right

=== Electoral Alliance 3 ===
Party		Political alignment
I	Liberal Alliance	Centre-right to Right-wing
M	Moderates	Centre to Centre-right
O	Danish People's Party	Right-wing to Far-right
V	Venstre	Centre-right

== Results by polling station ==
Division	A	B	C	D	E	F	I	J	K	M	O	T	V	Æ	Ø	Å
Division	%	%	%	%	%	%	%	%	%	%	%	%	%	%	%	%
Skolen ved Søerne	18.6	10.5	34.8	0.0	0.1	8.7	3.0	0.2	0.1	1.3	1.1	0.0	4.6	0.2	15.2	1.7
Skolen på Grundtvigsvej	20.5	9.1	37.4	0.0	0.0	7.7	2.8	0.2	0.0	1.0	0.9	0.0	4.9	0.1	13.8	1.5
Bülowsvejhallen	19.5	11.2	30.5	0.1	0.1	8.7	2.6	0.2	0.0	1.0	1.0	0.1	5.1	0.3	17.6	2.0
Skolen på Duevej	20.4	9.6	31.1	0.0	0.1	8.7	2.9	0.1	0.0	1.1	1.5	0.1	5.6	0.3	16.6	2.1
Lindevangskolen	21.9	7.6	32.4	0.1	0.1	7.4	2.8	0.4	0.1	1.3	2.4	0.1	4.9	0.4	16.6	1.6
Frederiksberghallerne	22.5	7.0	35.7	0.0	0.1	6.5	2.5	0.3	0.2	1.2	1.7	0.0	4.8	0.4	15.8	1.3
Frederiksberg Rådhushal	22.4	7.7	35.8	0.1	0.1	7.5	2.4	0.2	0.0	0.9	1.6	0.0	4.9	0.3	14.4	1.8
Skolen på Nyelandsvej	20.1	9.4	33.2	0.1	0.1	8.1	3.1	0.3	0.0	1.3	1.2	0.0	4.8	0.2	15.9	2.1

== Results ==
Party		Votes	%	+/-	Seats	+/-
Frederiksberg Municipality
C	Conservatives	21,238	33.67	-6.60	11	-2
A	Social Democrats	13,065	20.71	+3.66	7	+2
Ø	Red-Green Alliance	9,969	15.81	-1.74	5	-1
B	Social Liberals	5,728	9.08	-0.22	3	0
F	Green Left	5,020	7.96	+3.29	2	+1
V	Venstre	3,127	4.96	-0.94	2	+1
I	Liberal Alliance	1,740	2.76	+1.50	1	+1
Å	The Alternative	1,119	1.77	+0.99	0	0
O	Danish People's Party	898	1.42	+0.73	0	0
M	Moderates	718	1.14	New	0	New
Æ	Denmark Democrats	176	0.28	New	0	New
J	Bitten Vivi Jensen	139	0.22	-0.39	0	0
E	Hvid-sten Frederiksbergs uafhængige Borgerliste	43	0.07	New	0	New
K	Christian Democrats	33	0.05	-0.12	0	0
D	Ham Stokken	32	0.05	New	0	New
T	Borgernes Frederiksberg	29	0.05	New	0	New
Total		63,074	100	N/A	31	N/A
Invalid votes		141	0.16	-0.01		
Blank votes		566	0.65	+0.09		
Turnout		63,781	73.24	-0.12		
Source: valg.dk

== Opinion polls ==
Polling firm	Fieldwork date	Sample size	C	Ø	A	B	V	F	I	Å	O	J	K	D	E	M	T	Æ	Others	Lead
Epinion	4 Sep - 13 Oct 2025	587	27.7	18.5	20.8	5.0	6.5	11.5	6.4	0.7	1.9	–	–	–	–	0.5	–	0.5	0.0	6.9
Norstat			26.0 (10)	13.0 (4)	18.0 (6)	9.0 (3)	7.0 (2)	14.0 (4)	5.0 (1)	4.0 (1)	3.0 (0)	–	–	–	–	2.0 (0)	–	0.0 (0)	0.0	8.0
Epinion	27 Jul - 22 Aug 2025	495	31.0	11.0	21.0	6.0	8.0	12.0	5.0	1.0	2.0	–	0.0	–	–	1.0	–	0.0	0.0	10.0
(Projection)	2 Jun 2025		35.0 (11)	15.0 (4)	20.0 (7)	8.0 (2)	5.0 (2)	8.5 (3)	4.5 (1)	–	–	–	–	–	–	–	–	–	4.0	15.0
Norstat			37.0	14.0	17.0	8.0	4.0	10.0	6.0	2.0	1.0	–	–	–	–	1.0	–	1.0	1.0	20.0
2024 european parliament election	9 Jun 2024		10.3	12.5	11.2	12.6	9.4	23.6	6.8	3.9	2.9	–	–	–	–	5.6	–	1.2	–	11.0
2022 general election	1 Nov 2022		8.5	10.6	18.6	8.0	10.6	10.3	9.3	7.7	1.3	–	0.2	–	–	10.5	–	1.6	–	8.0
2021 regional election	16 Nov 2021		27.9	15.6	18.7	13.0	8.0	8.1	2.2	0.8	1.4	–	0.3	–	–	–	–	–	–	9.2
2021 municipal election	16 Nov 2021		40.3 (13)	17.5 (6)	17.1 (5)	9.3 (3)	5.9 (1)	4.7 (1)	1.3 (0)	0.8 (0)	0.7 (0)	0.6 (0)	0.2 (0)	–	–	–	–	–	–	22.8
