= Luno =

Luno may refer to:

- "Luno" (song), a song on Bloc Party's 2005 album Silent Alarm
- Luno the White Stallion, a Terrytoons television series
- Loyola University New Orleans, a university in New Orleans
- Bianco Luno (1795–1852), Danish entrepreneur
