= Ny Kongensgade 11 =

Building in Copenhagen, Denmark

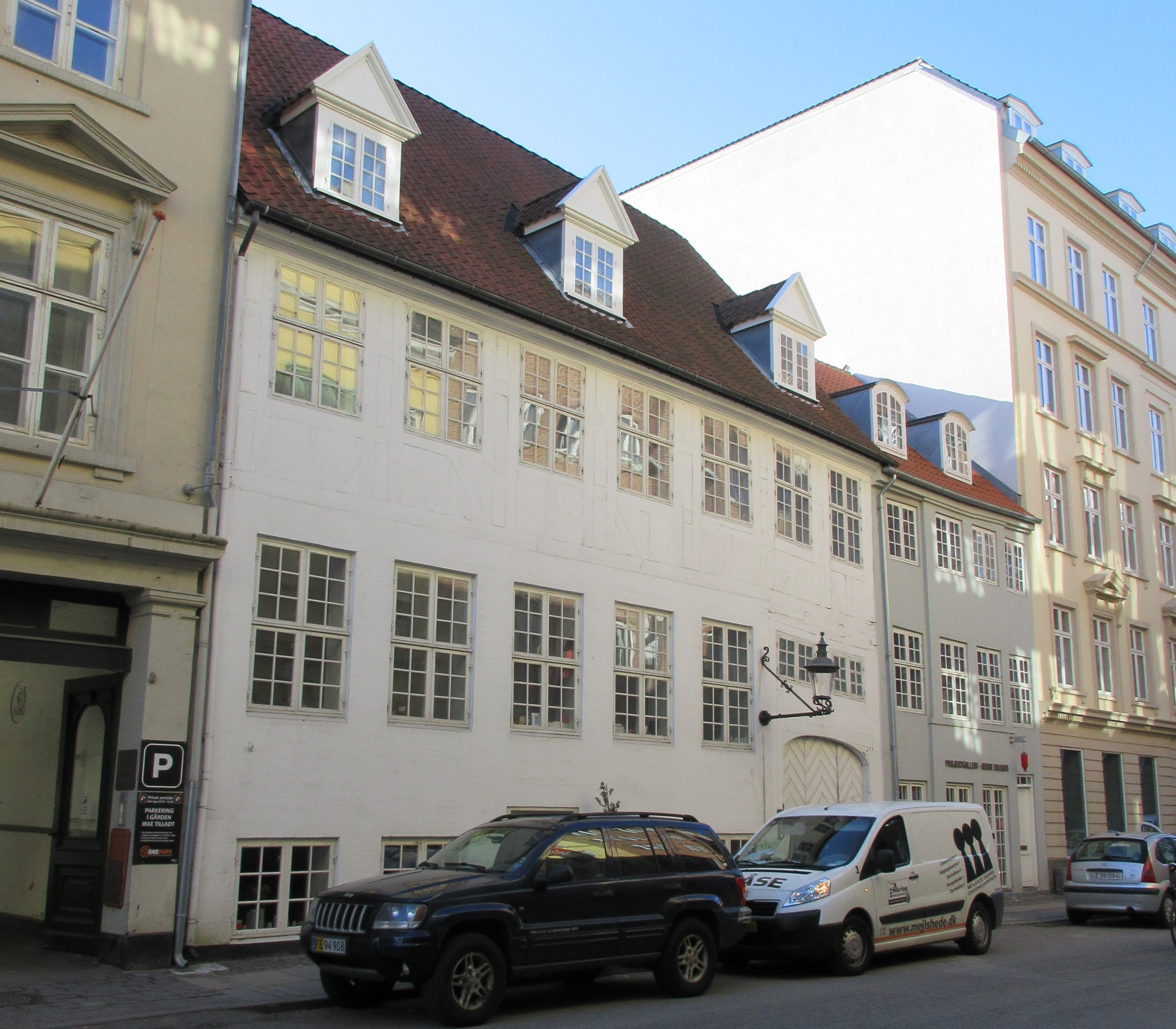
- Interactive map of the Ny Kongensgade 11 area

General information
- Location: Copenhagen, Denmark
- Coordinates: 55°40′25.13″N 12°34′34.73″E
- Completed: Before 1737

Ny Kongensgade 111 is a listed 19th century property in the Frederiksholm Quarter of central Copenhagen, Denmark. It was listed on the Danish registry of protected buildings and places in 1976.

== History ==
=== 18th century ===
The site was originally part of a larger property listed in Copenhagen's first cadastre from 11578 in Western Quarter. It belonged to 281-282 at that time. The present building on the site was constructed before 1737. The property was later acquired by Ludvig von Plessen. It was listed in the new cadastre of 1756 as No. 319 in Western Quarter.

=== 19th century ===
The property was later owned by Caspar Bürgel. It was listed in the new cadastre of 1795 as No. 216 in Western Quarter.

The composer and musician A. P. Berggreen (1801-1880) lived in the building in 1835. The philosopher and poet Poul Martin Møller was one of the residents in the building in 1836.

In 1753 No. 216 was merged with No. 242 E as 216 & 242 E.

The property was home to 23 residents at the 1880 census. Hanne Mathilde Elisabeth Thielmann (unreadable maiden name), a singing teacher, resided on the ground floor with her 15-year-old daughter Sophie Margrethe Thielmann. Emilie Christiane Catrine Kittendorff (1827–1899), a bookkeeper (widow of the xylographer Axel Kittendorff), resided on the ground floor with her 19-year-old daughter Anna Susanne Kittendorff. Christen Frederik Christoffer Møller (1830-1879), a theologian employed as a teacher, resided on the first floor with his Ellen Møller (née Brock, their three children (aged eight to 15) and one maid.

Niels Pedersen, a grocer (høker), resided in the basement with his wife Karen Jensdatter, two sons from his first marriage (aged seven and 12), a 17-year-old foster son and a maid.

Carl Christian Collard, a joiner, resided in the rear wing with his Sidse Marie Collard and 23-year-old daughter Fredrikke Christine Collard.

Ida Albertine Thielmann, owner of De Thielmannske Vertstederm resided on the first floor of the rear wing with her assistant Julie Georgine Pedrin /née Thielmann), music teacher Hermanine Lorentine Lassen and one maid.

=== 20th century ===
Karsten Rønnow (born 1932) and Anders Hegelund (born 1938) carried out a renovation in 1983. It received an award from the City of Copenhagen in 1984.

== Architecture ==
Ny Kongensgade 11 consists of two storeys over a high cellar and is seven bays wide. The roof is clad with red tiles and features five dormers. A half-timbered side wing extends from the rear side of the building. Part of it is from before 1737 but the five last bays date from 1900. The building was listed on the Danish registry of protected buildings and places on 15 December 1976.

== Today ==
The building contains apartments.
