= Grundtvigsvej =

Street in Frederiksberg

- Interactive map of Grundtvigsvej
- Length: 1,140 m (3,740 ft)
- Location: Copenhagen, Denmark
- Quarter: Frederiksberg
- Postal code: 1820
- Nearest metro station: Frederiksberg
- Coordinates: 55°43′18″N 12°32′16.12″E
- East end: Bülowsvej
- West end: Falkoner Allé

Grundtvigsvej is a street in the Frederiksberg district of Copenhagen, Denmark. It runs from Bülowsvej in the east to Falkoner Allé in the west. Grundtvigsvej School, a public primary school, is located at No. 11.

== History ==
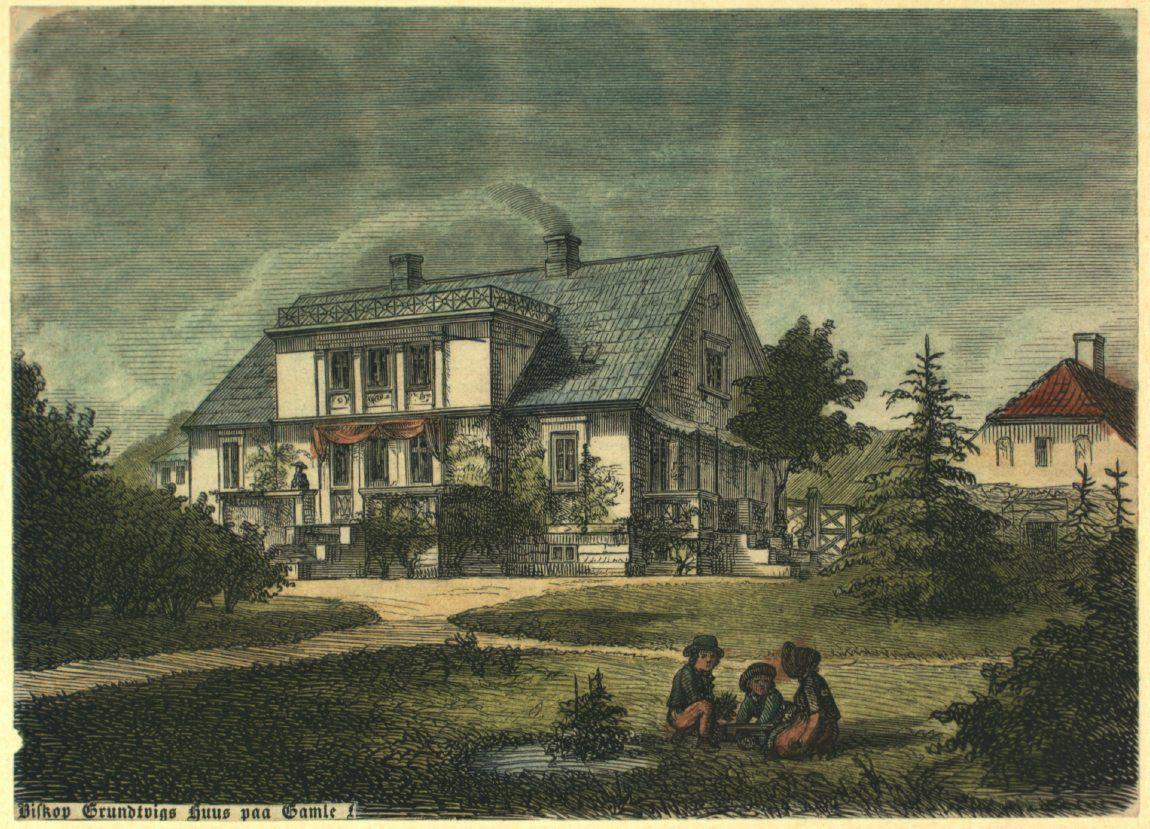
Christianshvile in 1861

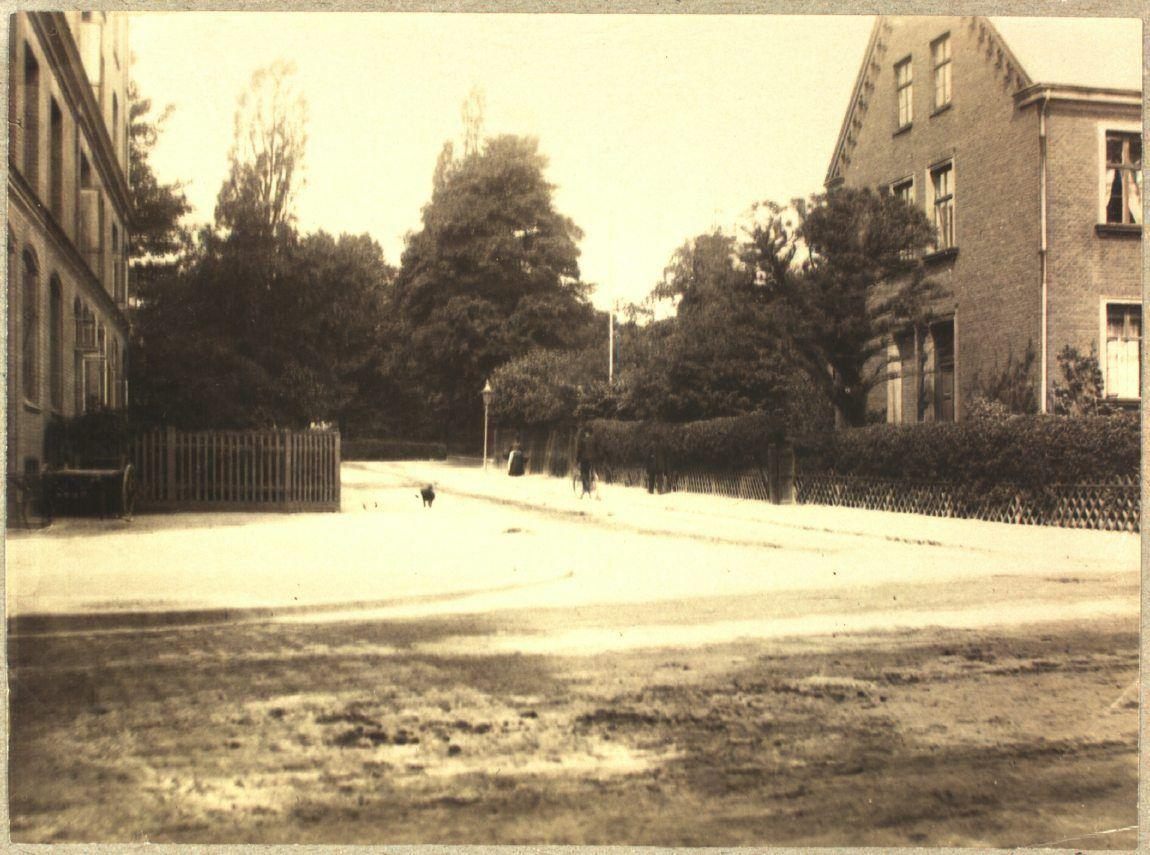
Grundtvigsvej at Ceresvej, looking west

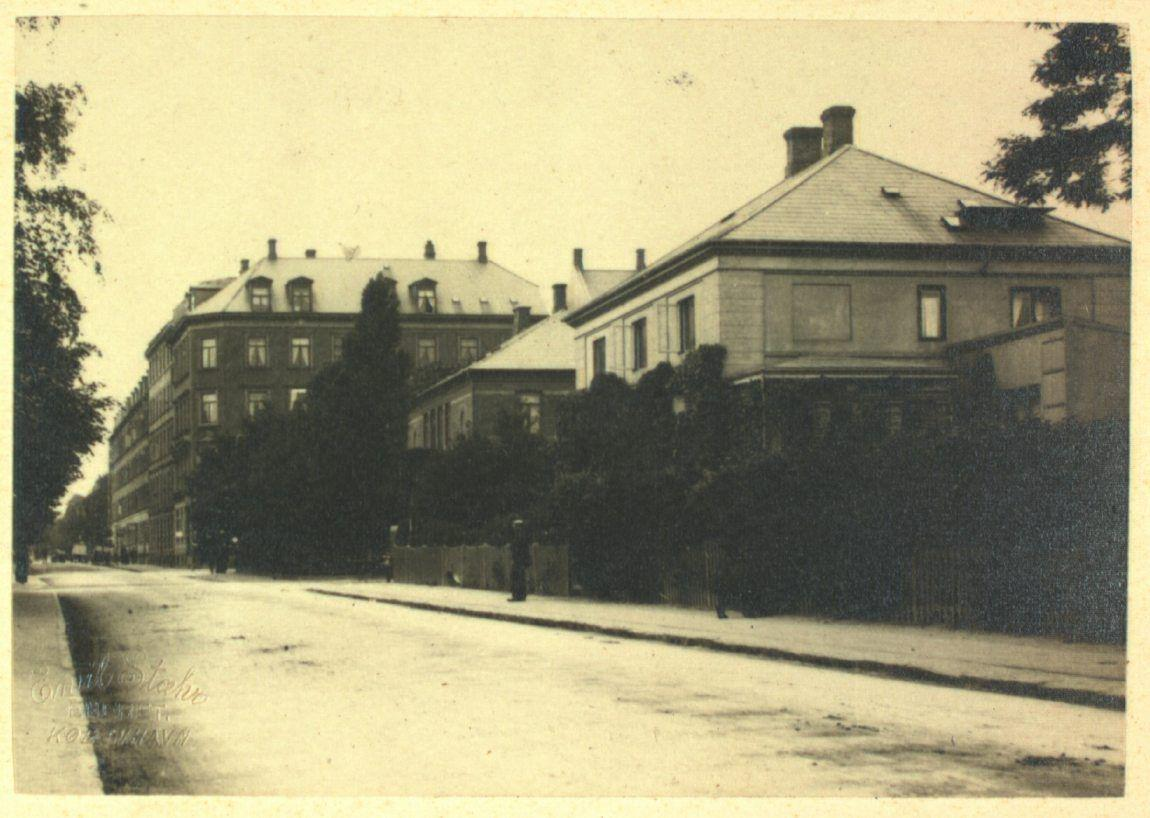
Grundtvigsvej seen from Bülowsvej, 1899

The land at the site was in the first half of the 19th century owned by an estate called Christianshvile. It was in 1847 acquired by royal book printer Bianco Luno. He adapted the main building in around 1850 and sold most of the land off in lots prior to his death in 1852. This resulted in the creation of Bianco Lunos Allé as well as the perpendicular side street Bianco Lunos Side Allé. One of the first buildings in the street was a house built for xylographer Axel Kittendorff to designs by Johan Daniel Herholdt in 1852 (now demolished). The interior of the house was decorated by Georg Hilker.

Christianshvile was from 1860 to 1868 owned by N. F. S. Grundtvig. Bianco Lunos Sideallé was in 1879 renamed Grundtvigsvej in commemoration of Grundtvig who had died a couple of years earlier. Christianshvile was demolished when Henrik Steffens Vej was created in 1907.

The street was extended westwards across C. Rathsack's market gardens in circa 1890.

Emmeches Metalvarefabrik, a manufacturer of metalware, was located in the street (No. 23). During the occupation of Denmark in World War II, on 19 September 1943, the company was subject to sabotage by members of the BOPA resistance movement.

== Buildings ==
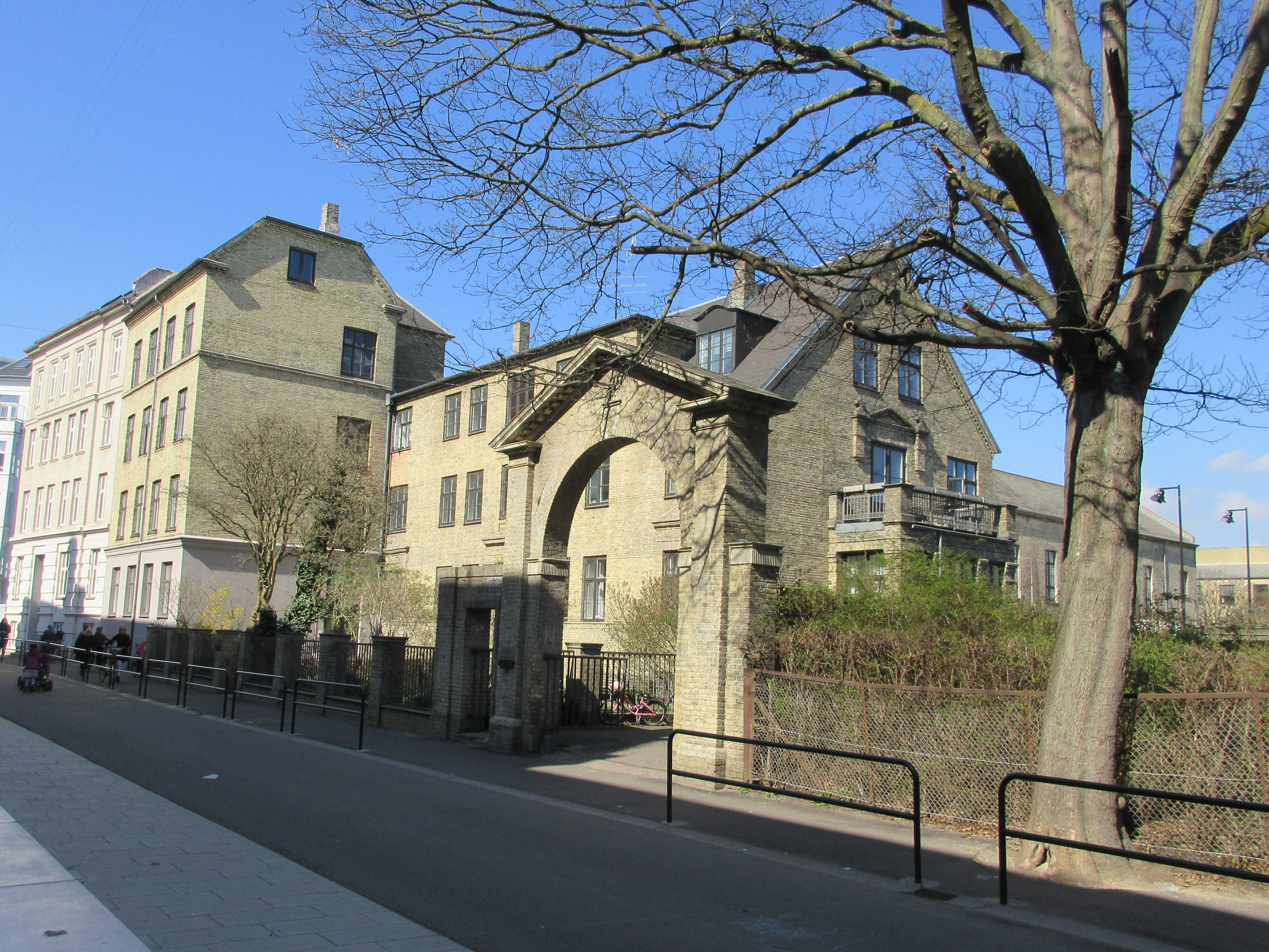
No. 14: Gimle

Grundtvigsvej School (No. 11) is the newest public primary school in Frederiksberg. It is based in the former Frøbel Seminarium.

Gimle (No. 14) is a former entertainment and event venue. It is now part of University of Copenhagen's Frederiksberg Campus.

Missionshuset Siloam (No. 37) was built by the Church Association for the Inner Mission in Denmark in 1897. The building was designed by Otto Beck (1867–1948).

The building at the corner with Bülowsvej (Bülowsvej 7A/Grundtvigsvej 2) is from 1902 and was designed by Emil Blichfeldt. The building at the corner with Henrik Steffens Vej is from 1928 and was designed by Alfred Skjøt-Pedersen. The former factory at No. 25 is from 1936 and was designed by Axel Maar.

== Transport ==
Frederiksberg metro station is located close to the western end of the street.
