= Roed =

Roed or Røed is a surname. Notable people with the surname include:

- Bolette Roed (born 1979), Danish recorder player
- Eivind Daniel Røed (born 1992), Norwegian football player and manager
- Fritz Røed (1928–2002), Norwegian sculptor
- Gullik Madsen Røed (1786–1857), Norwegian soldier and farmer
- Holger Roed (1846–1874), Danish painter
- Jørgen Roed (1808–1888), Danish portrait and genre painter
- Margrethe Røed (born 1976), Norwegian television presenter
- Reidun Røed (1921–2009), Norwegian resistance member
- Thomas Røed (born 1974), Norwegian football player
- Tine Susanne Miksch Roed (born 1964), Danish administrator and business executive
- Vegard Røed (born 1975), Norwegian football player
