= Skindergade 23 =

Building in Copenhagen

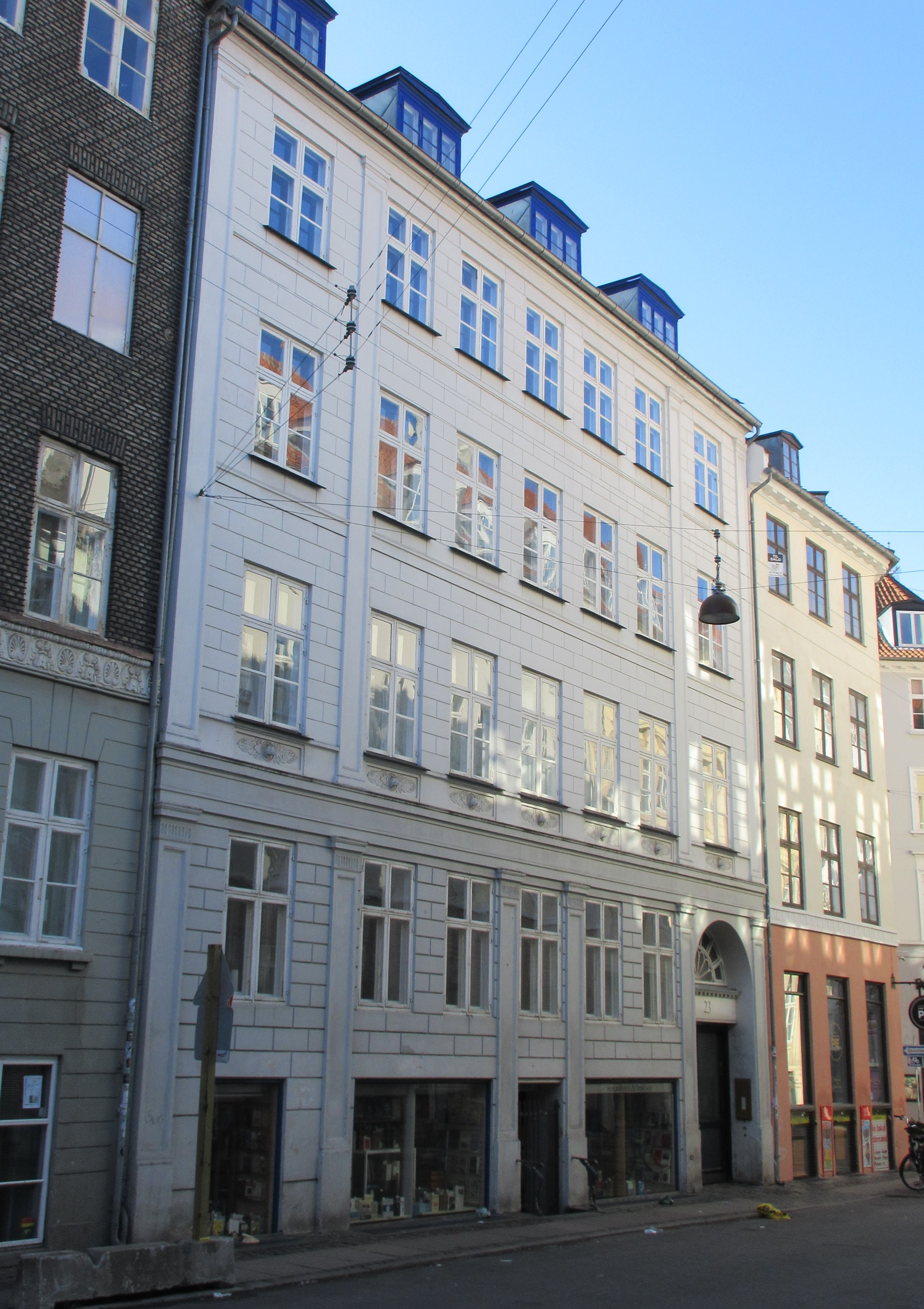
- Interactive map of the Skindergade 23 area

General information
- Location: Copenhagen, Denmark
- Coordinates: 55°40′47.21″N 12°34′29.53″E
- Completed: 1832
- Renovated: 1857

Skindergade 23 is a 19th-century property located on the southeast side of Skindergade, between Klosterstræde and Kejsergade, in the Old Town section of Copenhagen, Denmark.

The building was constructed in 1831–1832 but owes its current appearance to a renovation undertaken in 1857. It was listed in the Danish registry of protected buildings and places in 1961. Former residents include educator Jens Ernst Wegener, architect Michael Gottlieb Bindesbøll, artist and designer Thorvald Bindesbøll, composer Niels W. Gade and physician Andreas Brünniche.

== History ==
=== 18th century ===
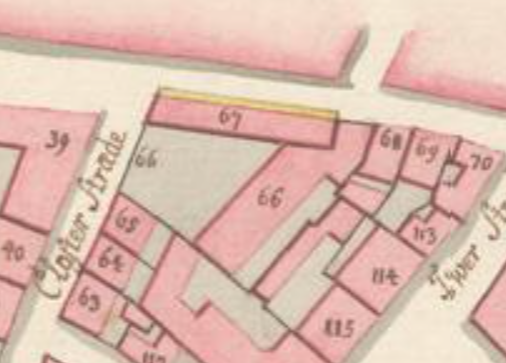
No. 66 and No. 67 seen on detail from Christian Gedde's map of Frimand's Quarter, 1757.

In the late 18th century, the site was two separate properties. Both in Frimand's Quarter, there was a narrow strip of land along Skindergade (No. 67), which was the site of a row of 13 low butchers' stalls. They were owned by the city and available to members of the butchers' guild. This property was listed as No. 38 in the new cadastre of 1806.

The plot south of the butchers' stall was listed as No. 66 in 1756 and was the site of the Brewers' Guild Hall (Bryggernes Laugshus). This property was listed as No. 04 in the new cadastre of 1806. In 1815 it was subsequently divided into No. 94A and No. 04B.

=== 19th century ===
In 1815 No. 38 and No. 94 A were merged into a single property as No. 94 A & 38. In 1821, No. 94 A & 38 were divided into No. 94 A 1 & 38 A (now Skindergade 23) and No. 94 A 2 & 38 B (now Klosterstræde 24/Skindergade 25). The current building at Skindergade 23 was constructed in 1831-32 for master joiner (snedkermester) Jens Christian Holst. It contained a single apartment on each of the floors.

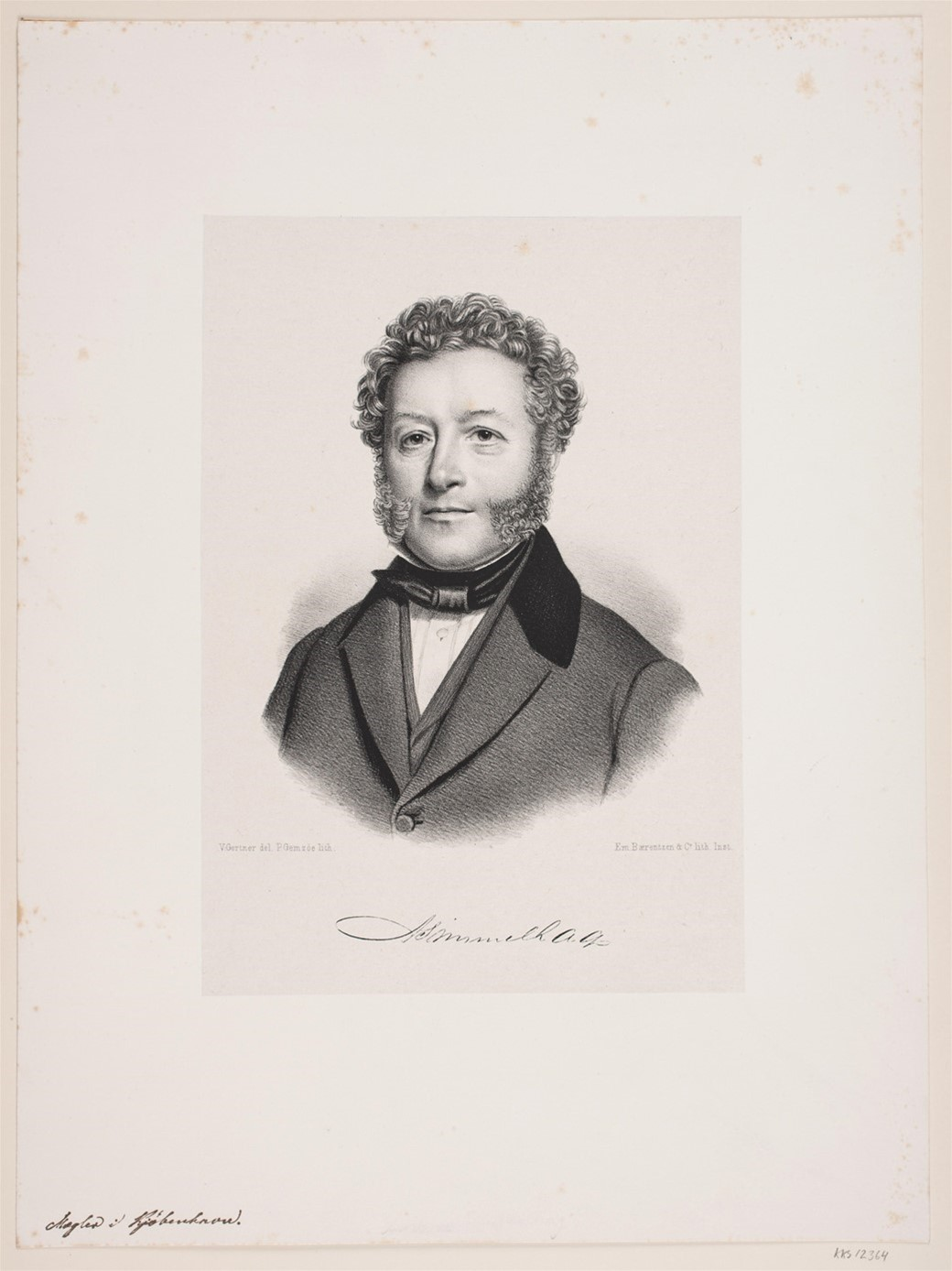
Peter Gemzøe: Andreas Simmelhag.

64-year-old Jens Christian Holst and his wife Hansine Elisabeth Petersen were at the time of the 1840 census living in the ground-floor apartment together with four employees (three joiners in their 20s and a joiner's apprentice) and two maids. Antomine Wilhelmine Wilder née Nissen, a 39-year-old widow, ran a boarding school for girls on the first floor. She lived there with her own six-year-old son, Hans Matheus Wilder, 30-year-old teacher Juliane Dorthea Bleynagel, 24-year-old maid Dorthea Rebekka Knodt and boarders Conradine Franciska Marcher, Elise Brechvold, Sophie Pontopidan, and Caroline Pontopidan. The two Pontopidan sisters were daughters of pastor Børge Pontoppidan (1776–1854) at Damsholte Church on Møn. Conradine Franciska Marcher was the daughter of ritmester and later chamberlain Benjamin Marcher (1797–1874). Elise Brechvold was also the daughter of a ritmester. Andreas Simmelhag, a businessman and broker, resided on the second floor with his wife Wilhelmine Maria Bülov, their three children (aged one to six), and two maids. Albert Hermansen, a clerk in Generaltoldkammeret, resided on the third floor with his wife Kathrine Christine Slackier, his sister-in-law Johanne Hendriche Slackier, his colleague from Generaltoldkammeret Carl Fridrick Rajkovitz, theology student Carl Ludvig Theodor Jacobi (1811–1879) and one maid. Søren Jensen, an innkeeper, resided in the basement with his wife Maren Lassen, and one maid.

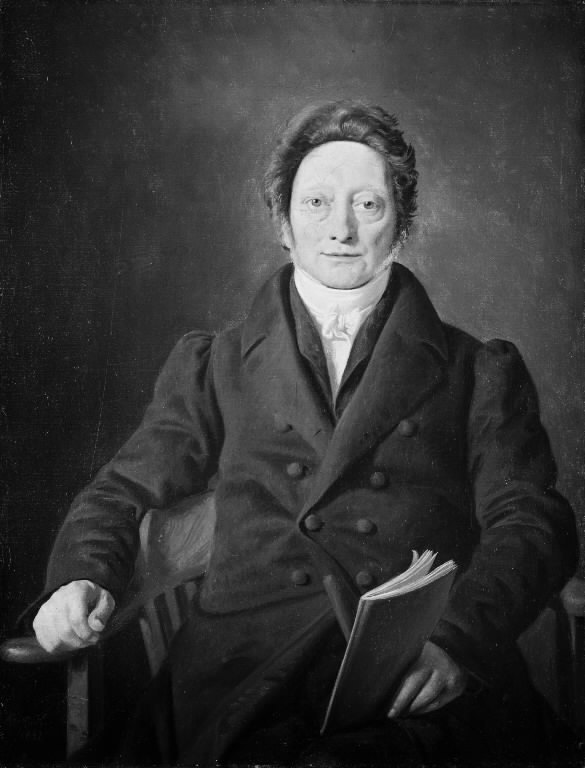
Constantin Hansen: Konsistorialråd J. Ernst Wegener

Jens Christian Holst and his family had by 1845 moved to the third-floor apartment. The number of residents by then had increased to 41. Lars Christensen, the proprietor of a café, was now residing on the ground floor with his wife Kendine Marie Pouline Knuth, their five children (aged one to fourteen) and one maid. Martin Balsgaard, a 35-year-old master saddler, resided on the ground floor of the side wing with his wife Anne Magrete Carlsen, three apprentices (aged 17 to 21), and one maid. Ludvig Anton Berg, a chief physician at the First Line Infantry Brigade, resided on the first floor with his wife Anne Sophie Petersen, their five children (aged 19 to 27), and one maid. Jens Ernst Wegener, the retired rector of Jonstrup Seminarium, resided on the second floor with his wife Maria Bindesbøll, their three children (aged 21 to 45), the 15-year-old grandson Jonas Bindesbøll and one maid. The eldest of the three unmarried children was the architect Michael Gottlieb Bindesbøll. He was working on the construction of Thorvaldsens Museum while he lived there. Gottlieb Bindesbøll resided in the building on and off until his death in 1857; he lived there in 1842–1847, 1850, and 1852–1856. His son Thorvald Bindesbøll was born in the building in 1846.

The composer Niels W. Gade (1817-1890) was among the residents of the building in 1858. He had most recently lived in an apartment at Sølvgade 28. In late 1858 or early 1859, Gade moved to another apartment a little further down the street at Skindergade 29.

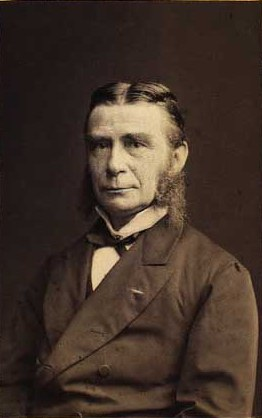
Andreas Brünniche by Hansen, Schou & Weller.

The property was by 1860 home to 37 people. Herm. Hartvigsen, a merchant, resided on the first floor with his wife Hanna née Cohen, their four children (aged five to nine), and one maid. Andreas Brünniche (1823-1908). a prominent physician resided on the second floor with his wife Livia Schytz née Granelli, four of their children (aged 24 to 28), a male servant, and a maid. Adelaide Emilie Tegder, a just 30-year-old widow with a pension, resided on the third floor with her six children (aged two to nine), three lodgers, and one maid. Christine Wilhelmine Olsen, a 33-year-old cleaning woman, resided in the garret with her 13-year-old son Adolph Theodor Berg and the 34-year old needleworker Birgithe Charlotte Muhlig. Carl Wilhelm Julius Barnevitz, a barber, resided in the ground floor apartment to the left with Emilie Berthine née Sørensen and the 16-year-old apprentice Hendrik Clausen. Ottilie Halm, a fashion retailer, registered as "married" but with no mention of her husband, resided in the ground floor apartment to the right with her seven-year-old son Wilhelm Halm. Lauritz Culmsee, a paper hanger, resided in the basement with his wife Wilhelmine née Hansen.

=== 20th century ===
The vintage book dealer J.P. Madsen opened Madsen Linds Antikvariat in the building in 1892. It was later continued by his daughter Aly until the 1970s.

F. A. C. OLSEN's ENKE, a mercery wholesale business, was based in the building as of 1910. The company was founded as a porcelain business by Friderich Andreas Christian Olsen (1827–1873) in 1952. He was licensed as a wholesaler (grosserer) and turned to mercery in 1855. The firm was continued after his death by his widow Henrikke Pauline Olsen (1826–1903). In 1881 she passed it to their son Hans Georg Waldemar Olsen (born 1855).

Two small rooms with low ceilings above the gateway were used during World War II as hideouts for members of the resistance movement.

== Architecture ==
Skindergade 23 is constructed with four stories over a walk-out basement. The building is seven bays wide, of which the two outer bays are wider than the five central ones. The facade owes its current appearance largely to a renovation of the building undertaken in 1857. The plastered facade is finished with shadow joints. It is on the ground floor below a belt course decorated with six pilasters with capitals, flanking the central and two outer bays. The gate in the bay furthest to the right (southwest) is topped by a fanlight. A basement entrance with cast-iron railings shaped as griffons is located in the central bay. An ornamental frieze below the belt course was removed in connection with the 1857 renovation. The two outer bays are on the first to third floor flanked by lesenes. The windows on these floors are all accented with slate sills and there are rectangular relief ornaments with animal heads below the first-floor windows. The pitched roof is clad with red tile and features six dormer windows, four towards the street and two towards the yard. The roof ridge is pierced by a chimney. A perpendicular wing with kitchens and the building's secondary staircase extends from the rear side of the building along the northeast side of a small courtyard. The yard side of the building is plastered in an iron vitriol yellow color.

== Today ==
The property is today owned by Ejerforeningen Skindergade 23 and contains a single condominium on each of the five upper floors. Most of them are today used as office space. The Booktrader, a vintage bookshop known for its large section with English-language books, is based in the basement.
