= Oscar Wanscher =

Danish surgeon

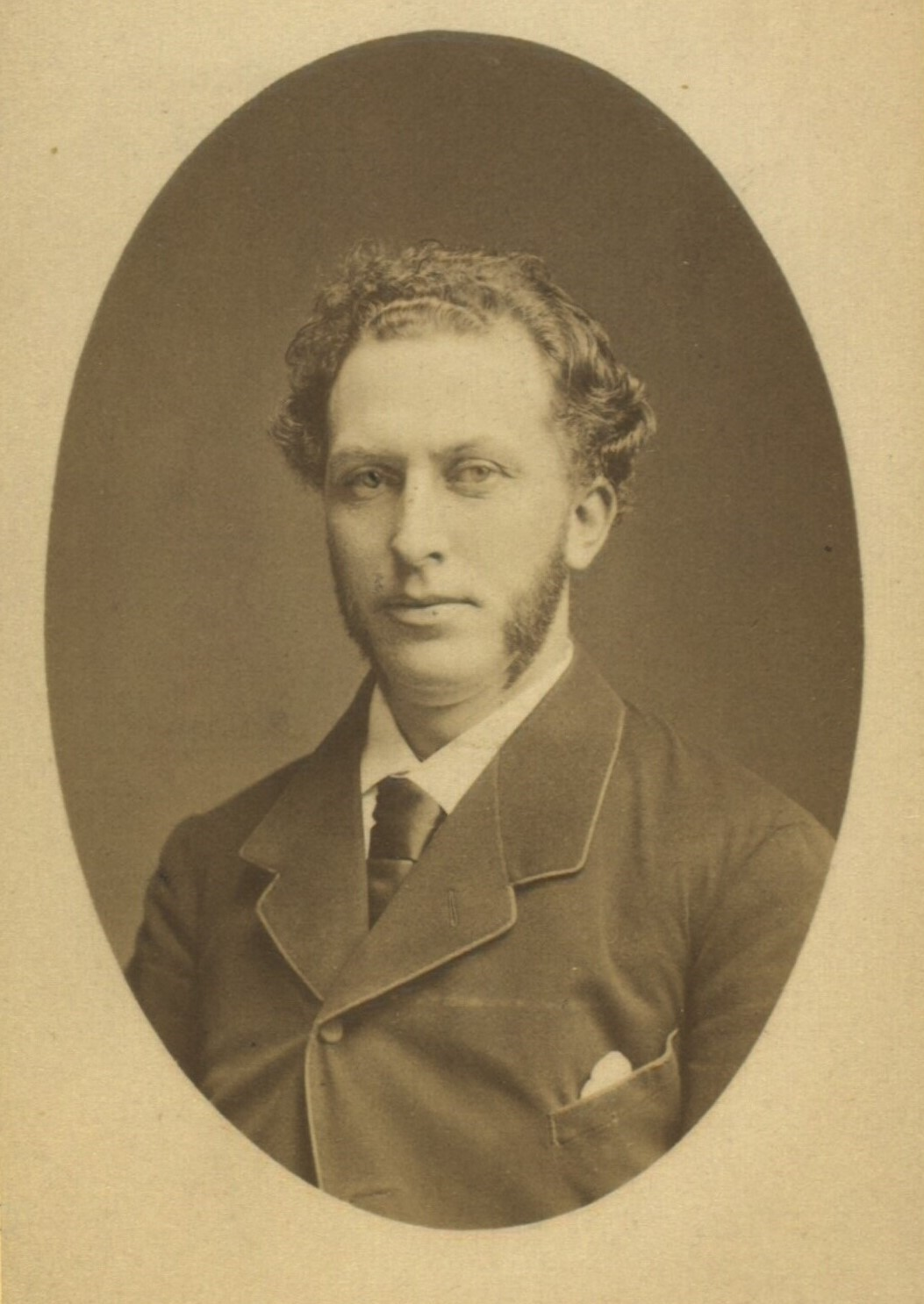
Oscar Wanscher

Oscar Wanscher (19 March 1846 – 7 March 1906) was a Danish surgeon.

== Early life and education ==
Wanscher was born on 19 March 1846 in Copenhagen, the son of paper merchant Wilhelm Wanscher (1802–82) and Karen Johanne Juliane Wegener (1814–79). He matriculated from.Westen's institute and earned a Master of Medicine degree from the University of Copenhagen in 1871. He then went on to study eye diseases for two years at E. Grut's eye clinic. In 1872–84, he worked at Copenhagen Municipal Hospital. In 1877, he defended his dissertation (Om Diphtheritis og Croup).

== Career ==
In 1879, Wanscher became a corps physician in the army and acting chief physician at the Garrison Hospital. He was instrumental in introducing ether at the hospital as a replacement for chloroform as an anesthetic. In 1885, he unsuccessfully competed with E. A. Tschernin and O. Bloch for the position as Mathias Saxtorph's successor at the university (in. In 1890, he left the army. In 1892, he succeeded P. Plum as chief surgeon at Frederiks Hospital. Wanscher had for some time struggled with depressions. His mental issues made it increasingly difficult for him to continue his career. His publications included the first section of operativ Kirurgi (1898). In 1900, he was appointed professor extraordinary in surgical pathology.

== Personal life ==
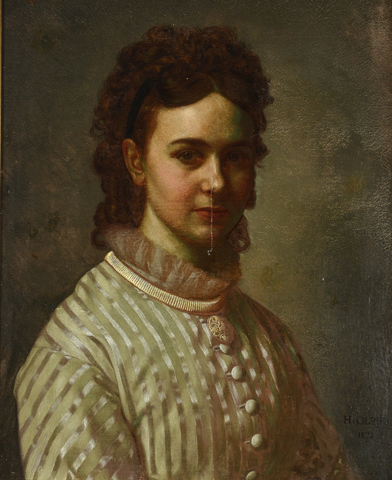
Johanne Margrethe Wanscher.

On 19 January 1881, Wanscher married Johanne Margrethe Hage (1850–1929). She was the daughter of businessman Christopher Theodor Friedenreich Hage (1819–72) and Nannie (Nancy) Amelie Margrethe Hammerich (1827–1902). They were the parents of a daughter and two sons. The daughter Ellen Margrethe Wanscher (1883–1867) married the architect Mogens Lassen.
