= Vegard Røed =

Norwegian footballer

Personal information
- Date of birth: 22 January 1970 (age 56)
- Position: Midfielder

Youth career
- Lier

Senior career*
Years	Team	Apps	(Gls)
1993–1996	Strømsgodset		
1997–2015	Drafn		

International career
1991	Norway u-15	5	(1)
1993	Norway u-17	1	(0)
- * Club domestic league appearances and goals

Vegard Røed (born 1 December 1975) is a retired Norwegian football midfielder.

He started his youth career in Lier IL and represented Norway as a youth international. He made his debut for Strømsgodset IF in 1993 and played in the 1994 and 1996 Eliteserien. Ahead of the 1997 season, he joined lowly SBK Drafn.

He is also a younger brother of Thomas Røed.
