= 2021 Frederiksberg municipal election =

← 2017	16 November 2021	2025 →

All 29 seats to the Frederiksberg Municipal Council 15 seats needed for a majority
- Turnout: 61,747 (73.4%) ▲2.2pp
	First party	Second party	Third party
	C	Ø	A
Party	Conservatives	Red–Green Alliance	Social Democrats
Last election	11 seat, 37.1%	3 seats, 12.1%	4 seats, 16.0%
Seats won	13	6	5
Seat change	▲2	▲3	▲1
Popular vote	24,607	10,720	10,418
Percentage	40.3%	17.6%	17.0%
Swing	▲3.2%	▲5.5%	▲1.0%
	Fourth party	Fifth party	Sixth party
	B	V	F
Party	Social Liberals	Venstre	Green Left
Last election	3 seats, 9.7%	1 seat, 6.3%	1 seat, 6.2%
Seats won	3	1	1
Seat change	0	0	0
Popular vote	5,686	3,603	2,852
Percentage	9.3%	5.9%	4.7%
Swing	▼0.4%	▼0.4%	▼1.5%
	Seventh party	Eighth party
	I	Å
Party	Liberal Alliance	The Alternative
Last election	1 seat, 3.6%	1 seat, 5.5%
Seats won	0	0
Seat change	▼1	▼1
Popular vote	769	482
Percentage	1.3%	0.8%
Swing	▼2.3%	▼4.7%
Mayor before election
Simon Aggesen (Note: Jørgen Glenthøj became mayor after the 2017 election, but stepped down in 2019)
Conservatives
Mayor after election
Michael Vindfeldt
Social Democrats

Since 1909, the Conservatives had held the mayor's position in Frederiksberg Municipality. . (Note: In 1909, Marius Godskesen became mayor as member of Højre, however the party became a part of the Conservatives in 1915) This was despite the red bloc often having success in the municipality for Danish general elections. In example, it was the municipality where the bloc received their 8th highest percentage of votes in 2019.

In the 2017 election, the red bloc and blue bloc had sat in opposite electoral alliances, and only 272 votes had split the 25th seat, handing the seat to the electoral alliance of the blue bloc. Following this, Jørgen Glenthøj from the Conservatives would win his third term.

In 2019, Jørgen Glenthøj stepped down as mayor, citing he wanted to spend more time with his family. Simon Aggesen from the same party would take over.

Due to the close result in the previous election and the fact that Frederiksberg Municipality was the municipality with the highest number of first-time voters, this election was seen as one of the most exciting one's of the 2017 Danish local elections.

For this election, the council would increase from 25 to 29 seats, being the only municipality in the 2017 Danish local elections to change their number of seats.

The result would see the Conservatives once again become the biggest party. However, for the first time in 112 years, it seemed as though they might lose the mayor's position. The traditional red bloc had won 15 seats and a majority. Only 416 votes had separated the two electoral alliances, in which the two blocs once again had entered. The Red–Green Alliance had become the biggest party of the red bloc, but it would be Michael Vindfeldt from the Social Democrats, who would become the new mayor, after an agreement was reached between themselves, the Social Liberals , the Green Left and Red–Green Alliance. This would mark the first time in 112 years that the Conservatives would not hold the mayor's position of the municipality.

== Electoral system ==
For elections to Danish municipalities, a number varying from 9 to 31 are chosen to be elected to the municipal council. The seats are then allocated using the D'Hondt method and a closed list proportional representation. Frederiksberg Municipality had 29 seats in 2021

Unlike in Danish General Elections, in elections to municipal councils, electoral alliances are allowed.

== Electoral alliances ==
=== Electoral Alliance 1 ===
Party		Political alignment
A	Social Democrats	Centre-left
B	Social Liberals	Centre to Centre-left
E	Hvid-sten	Local politics
F	Green Left	Centre-left to Left-wing
G	Vegan Party	Single-issue
J	Bitten Vivi Jensen	Local politics
T	Volt	Local politics
Ø	Red–Green Alliance	Left-wing to Far-Left
Å	The Alternative	Centre-left to Left-wing

=== Electoral Alliance 2 ===
Party		Political alignment
C	Conservatives	Centre-right
D	New Right	Right-wing to Far-right
I	Liberal Alliance	Centre-right to Right-wing
K	Christian Democrats	Centre to Centre-right
O	Danish People's Party	Right-wing to Far-right
V	Venstre	Centre-right

== Results by polling station ==
E = Hvid-sten
H = Havenisse-partiet
J = Bitten Vivi Jessen
T = Volt
Y = Kærlighedspartiet (Regnbuef/ Bef)

Division	A	B	C	D	E	F	G	H	I	J	K	O	T	Y	V	Æ	Ø	Å
Division	%	%	%	%	%	%	%	%	%	%	%	%	%	%	%	%	%	%
10. Kreds, Søerne	15.3	10.7	38.3	0.6	0.1	5.0	0.3	0.0	1.6	0.6	0.3	0.7	0.3	0.1	5.9	0.2	19.4	0.7
10. Kreds, Grundtvigsvej	15.3	9.7	43.1	0.7	0.0	4.1	0.3	0.0	1.3	0.6	0.1	0.4	0.2	0.0	6.1	0.1	17.2	0.7
10. Kreds, Duevej	15.9	10.9	39.1	0.7	0.1	5.1	0.2	0.1	1.2	0.4	0.1	0.7	0.1	0.1	7.1	0.2	17.3	0.8
10. Kreds, Bülowsvej	16.0	11.2	37.5	0.7	0.1	5.2	0.3	0.1	1.1	0.5	0.1	0.5	0.2	0.0	5.9	0.2	19.6	0.8
11. Kreds, Nyelandsvej	16.3	8.4	41.5	0.7	0.1	4.7	0.3	0.1	1.3	0.8	0.2	0.6	0.1	0.1	5.3	0.1	18.4	0.9
11. Kreds, Rådhuset	18.2	7.9	43.5	0.9	0.1	4.4	0.4	0.1	1.2	0.7	0.2	0.6	0.2	0.1	5.7	0.2	14.8	0.9
11. Kreds, Søndermark	19.1	7.8	42.5	0.9	0.1	3.8	0.3	0.2	1.0	0.7	0.2	1.1	0.1	0.1	5.2	0.2	15.9	0.7
11. Kreds, Lindevang	20.4	7.1	37.8	1.1	0.1	4.8	0.4	0.1	1.5	0.8	0.2	1.0	0.1	0.0	5.8	0.5	17.5	0.7

== Results ==
Party		Votes	%	+/-	Seats	+/-
Frederiksberg Municipality
C	Conservatives	24,607	40.27	+3.18	13	+2
Ø	Red-Green Alliance	10,720	17.55	+5.46	6	+3
A	Social Democrats	10,418	17.05	+1.02	5	+1
B	Social Liberals	5,686	9.31	-0.37	3	0
V	Venstre	3,603	5.90	-0.42	1	0
F	Green Left	2,852	4.67	-1.50	1	0
I	Liberal Alliance	769	1.26	-2.39	0	-1
D	New Right	484	0.79	+0.24	0	0
Å	The Alternative	482	0.79	-4.72	0	-1
O	Danish People's Party	425	0.70	-1.44	0	0
J	Bitten Vivi Jensen	374	0.61	New	0	New
G	Vegan Party	201	0.33	New	0	New
Æ	Freedom List	134	0.22	New	0	New
K	Christian Democrats	105	0.17	+0.04	0	0
T	Volt	105	0.17	New	0	New
E	Hvid-sten	53	0.09	New	0	New
H	Havenisse-partiet	49	0.08	New	0	New
Y	Kærlighedspartiet (Regnbuef / Bef)	33	0.05	New	0	New
Total		61,100	100	N/A	29	N/A
Invalid votes		143	0.17	-0.01		
Blank votes		504	0.60	-0.14		
Turnout		61,747	73.35	+2.14		
Source: valg.dk
