= Thomas Røed =

Norwegian footballer (born 1974)

Personal information
- Date of birth: 26 May 1974 (age 52)
- Place of birth: Drammen, Norway
- Height: 1.81 m (5 ft 11 1/2 in)
- Positions: Midfielder; forward

Youth career
- Lier IL

Senior career*
Years	Team	Apps	(Gls)
1991–1993	Åssiden IF		
1994–1997	Strømsgodset IF	82	(11)
1998	→ Odd Grenland (Loan)	26	(7)
1999–2003	Odd Grenland	84	(16)
2004	Pors Grenland	5	(1)
2005–2007	Åssiden IF		
- * Club domestic league appearances and goals

Thomas Røed (born 26 May 1974) is a retired Norwegian football midfielder.

He started his youth career in Lier IL and is the older brother of Vegard Røed.

Røed spent much of his career with Odd Grenland, playing for the club from 1999 through the 2003 season and winning the Norwegian Cup in 2000. In 2004, he moved to the second-tier club Pors Grenland and scored one goal there. He also played for Odd Grenland in European competition, appearing in the 2001-02 UEFA Cup qualifying round against Helsingborgs IF.

After retiring he was the head coach of Lier IL, leaving in 2012 to become assistant manager of Sparta/Bragerøen. Sparta/Bragerøen merged to form Stoppen SK, which Røed then coached.

== Personal life ==
His son Sander played for Kongsvinger and Notodden. In 2025, his daughter Elena made her debut for Strømsgodset's senior team.
