= Bülowsvej =

Street in Copenhagen, Denmark

Allégade
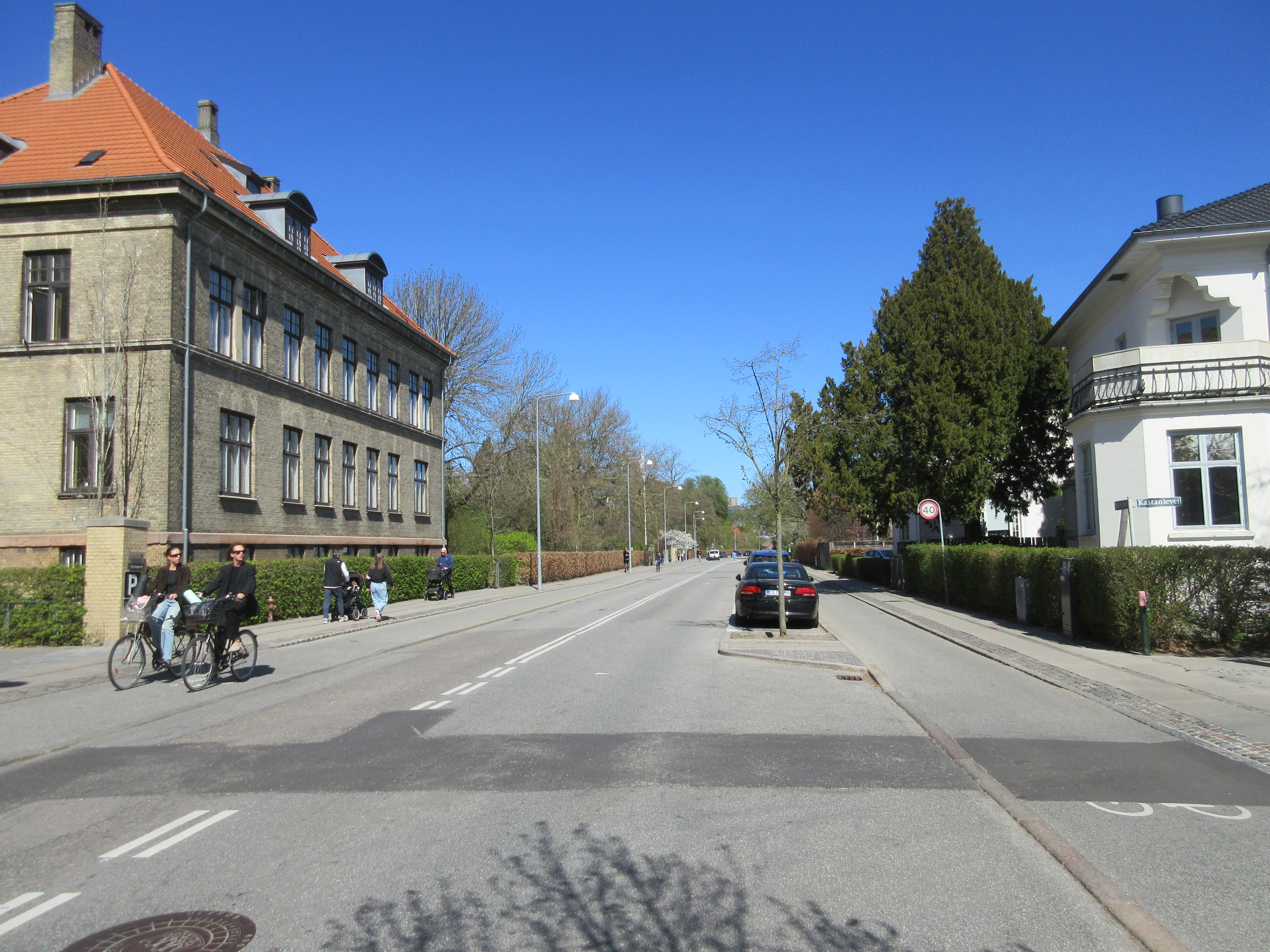
- Interactive map of Allégade
- Length: 1,030 m (3,380 ft)
- Location: Frederiksberg, Copenhagen, Denmark
- Postal code: 1870
- Coordinates: 55°40′53.4″N 12°32′39.12″E

Bülowsvej is a street in the Frederiksberg district of Copenhagen, Denmark. It runs from Gammel Kongevej in the south to Åboulevard in the north, linking Madvigs Allé with Brohusgade. The University of Copenhagen's Frederiksberg Campus dominates the west side of the street with its large main building from 1895. The east side of the street is home to one of Denmark's oldest neighbourhoods of single family detached homes.

== History ==
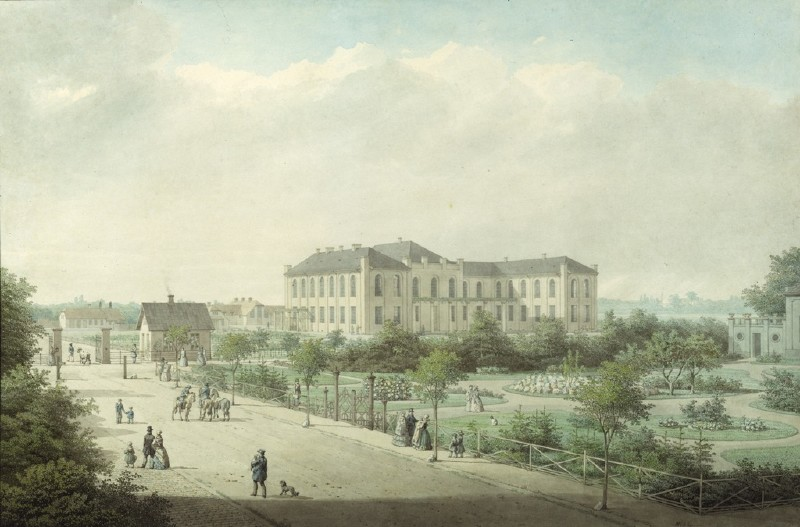
Bülowsvej with the newly built Agricultural College in about 1860

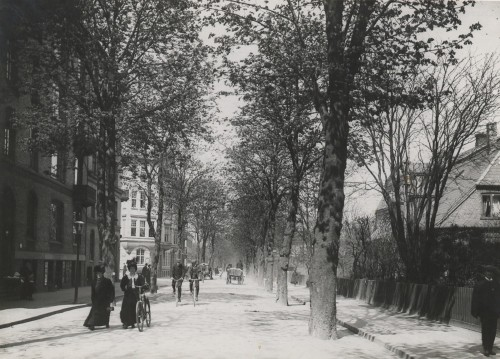
Bÿlowsvej in the 1900s

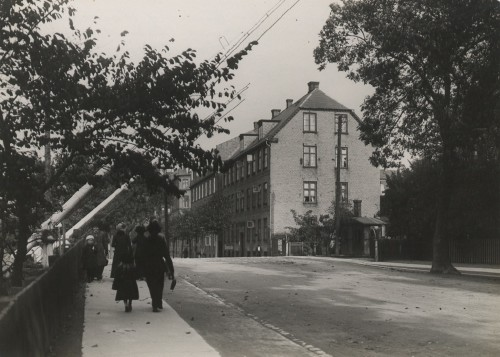
The West Line crossing Bÿlowsvej

Bülowsvej runs approximately where the first part of Ladegårdsvej was constructed in approximately 1574 but the name is first mentioned in 1770.

The modern street takes its name after Frederik Christoffer Bülow who was inspector at Ladegården. When the so-called Demarcation Line was moved from Jagtvej to The Lakes in 1852, he acquired large areas of land, both between the Ladegård Canal and Gammel Kongevej in Frederiksberg and at Blågård in Nørrebro. He sold off the land in Frederiksberg in lots with a registered contractual term (Danish: servitut), effective until 1925, ensuring that it could only be used for low, private villas. Bülow proposed that H. C. Ørstedsvej was extended all the way to Gammel Kongevej but this was rejected. He then established Bülowsvej on his own land, naming it after himself.

Frederiksberg became an independent municipality in 1968. In 1858, the new Royal Veterinary and Agricultural University's main building was inaugurated on the west side of the street as a replacement for the old Royal Veterinarian School on Sankt Annæ Gade in Christianshavn. The railway to Roskilde crossed the street from its opening in 1864. In 1902, Paul Bergsøe opened a metalware factory at a site next to the railway on the east side of the street. It was demolished in 1945. The railway crossing disappeared when the current rail line opened in the 1940s.

== Notable buildings and residents ==
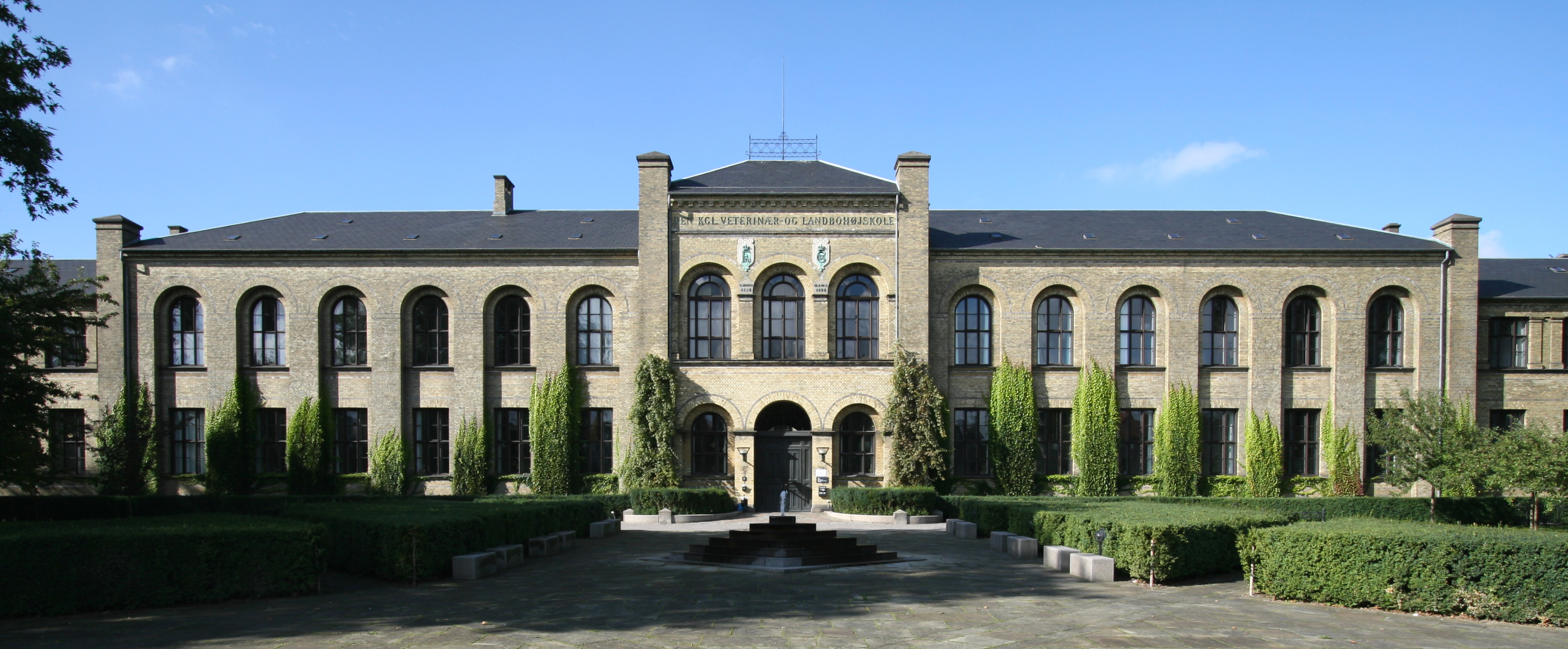
The main building of University of Copenhagen's Frederiksberg Campus

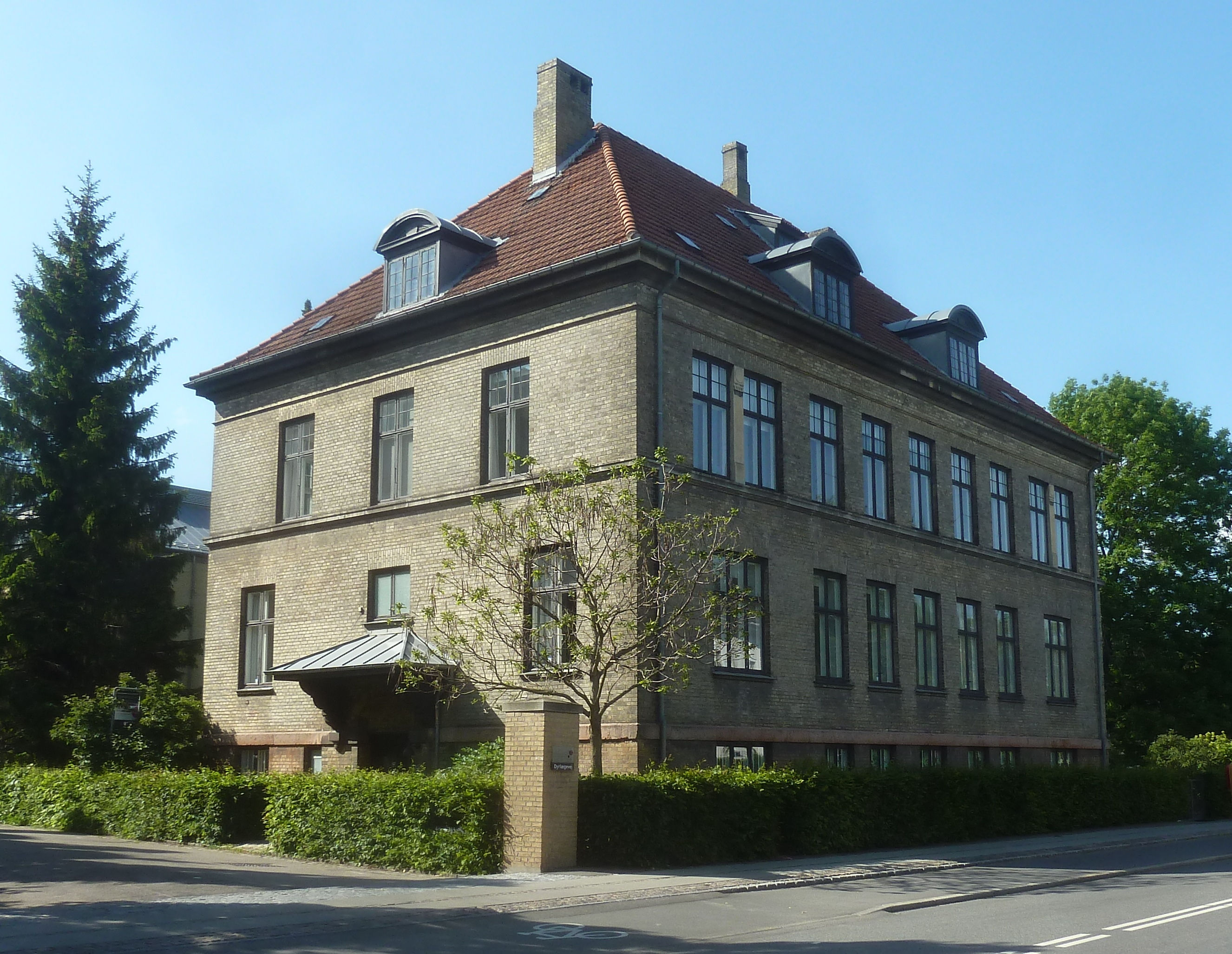
Bülowsvej 15

Bülowvej's most prominent landmark is the main building of University of Copenhagen's Frederiksberg Campus (No. 17). It owes its current appearance to an extension designed by Johannes Emil Gnudtzmann in 1895. To the north of the old main building, on the other side of Thorvaldsensvej, is Copenhagen Plant Science Center under construction. It will consist of four cylindrical buildings designed by Lundgaard & Tranberg.

DTU Vet, National Veterinary Institute (No. 27), part of the Technical University of Denmark, conducts research in infectious animal diseases. It is the result of a merger of the Royal Veterinary and Agricultural College's Serumlaboratorium (founded in 1908) and Statens Veterinære Institut for Virusforskning (founded in 1926) in 2002 under the name Danmarks Veterinærinstitut. It has been part of DTU since 1 January 2007.

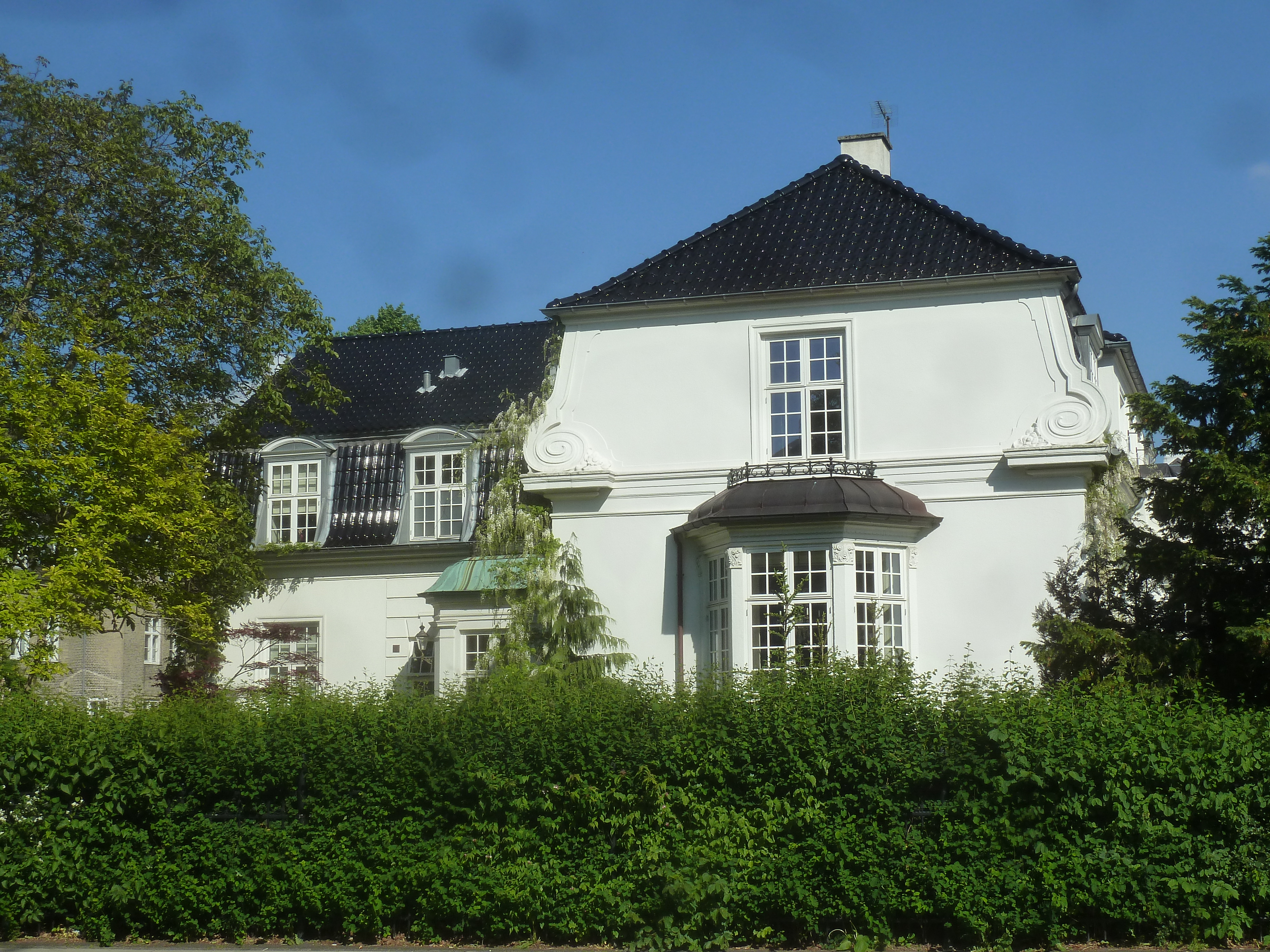
Amalievej 2

The Neo-Baroque apartment building on the corner of Bülowsvej (No. 40) with Rosenørns Allé is from 1905 and was designed by Axel Preisler and Povl Baumann.

The area on the east side of the street is Denmark's oldest neighbourhood of single family detached housing. It comprises streets such as Uraniavej, Lindevej, Kastanievej and Amalievej.

== See alsæ ==
- Bianco Lunos Allé
