= Axel Kittendorff =

Danish xylographer

Jacob Holm
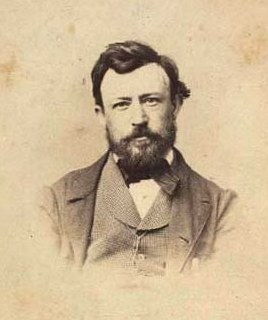
- Jacob Holm painted in 1834
- Born: 19 October 1821; Copenhagen, Denmark
- Died: 8 March 1868 (aged 46); Frederiksberg, Denmark
- Occupations: Xylographer and publisher

Axel Theodor Kittendorff (19 October 1821 - 8 March 1868) was a Danish xylographer.

== Early life and education ==
Kittendorff was born on 19 October 1821 in Copenhagen, the son of master weaver Johann Adolph Friedrich Kittendorff (1793–1849) and Anna Amalie Elisabeth Kuhn (1797–1864). After his confirmation, he became an apprentice in xylographer Andreas Flinch's workshop while at the same time attending classes at the Royal Danish Academy of Fine Arts. He exhibited his first woodcuts at Charlottenborg when he was in his early twenties. He spent 1848–49 abroad, working as a xylographer in Berlin and Leipzig.

== Career ==
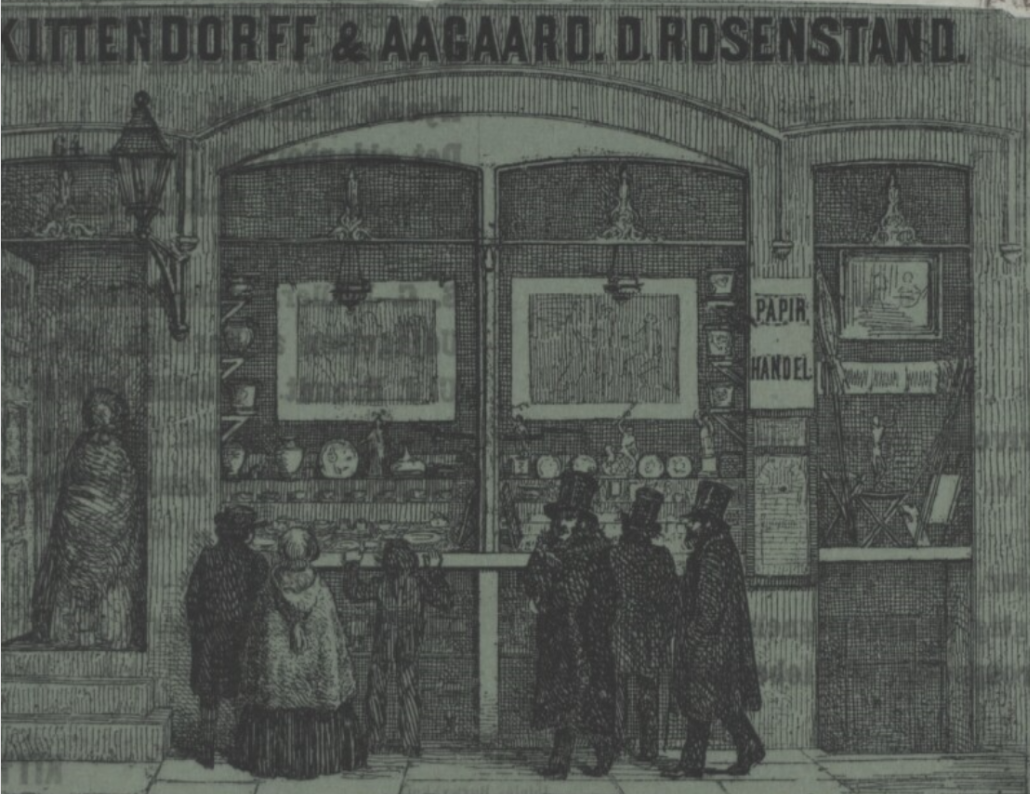
Kittendorff & Aagaard in Købmagergade

Back in Denmark, in 1849, Kittendorff and Johan Aagaard established their own workshop under the name Kittendorff & Aagaard. It soon developed into one of the leading studios of its kind in Copenhagen. The company was based in Købmagergade. The activities also comprised a store with prints and book publishing. Xylographers who worked for the firm included H.C. Henneberg, J.F. Rosenstand and H.P. Hansen. Many of the illustrations for their richly illustrated publications were created by Kittendorff's brother Adolph Kittendorff.

== Personal life ==
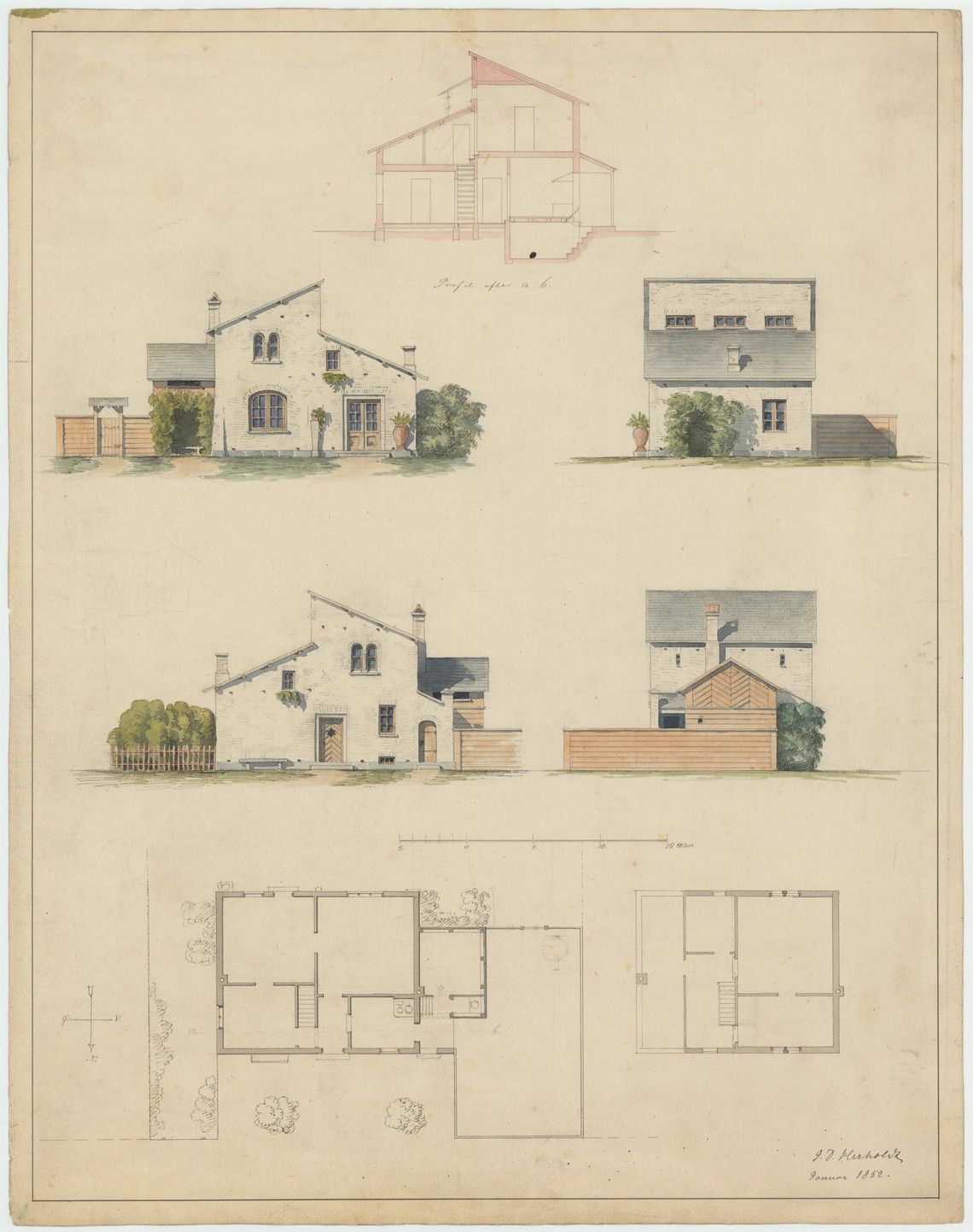
Rendering for Kittendorf's villa at Bianco Lunos Sideallé

Kittendorff married Emilie Christiane Catharina Kretzschmer (19 April 1827 i Kbh. - 22 March 1902), a daughter of flaxshopkeeper Peter Christian Kretzschmer (1796–1835) and Susanne Nicoline Goldberg (1800–45), on 5 March 1853 in Church of Our Lady in Copenhagen.

In 1852, Kittendorff commissioned the architect Johan Daniel Herholdt to design a villa for him at Bianco Lunos Side Allé in Frederiksberg. He died on 8 March 1868 in Frederiksberg and is buried at Frederiksberg Old Cemetery.
