= Jens Ernst Wegener =

Danish educator and pedagogical writer (1781–1846)

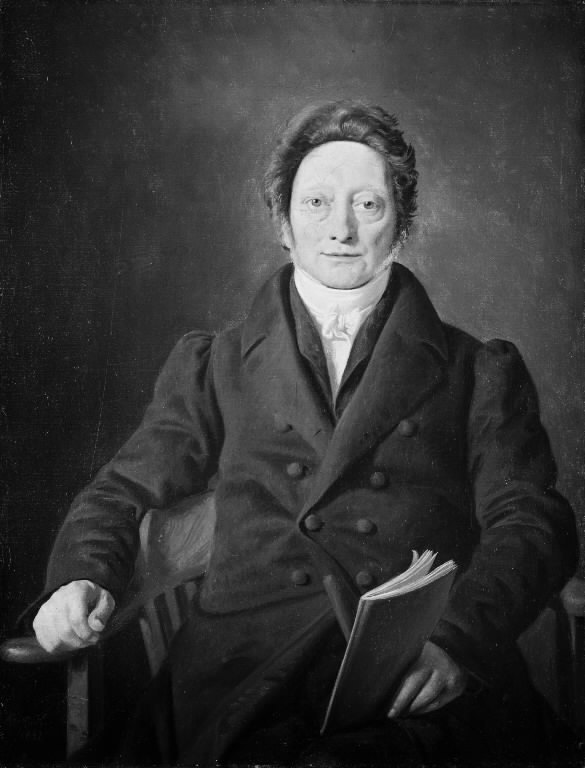
Constantin Hansen: Konsistorialråd J. Ernst Wegener

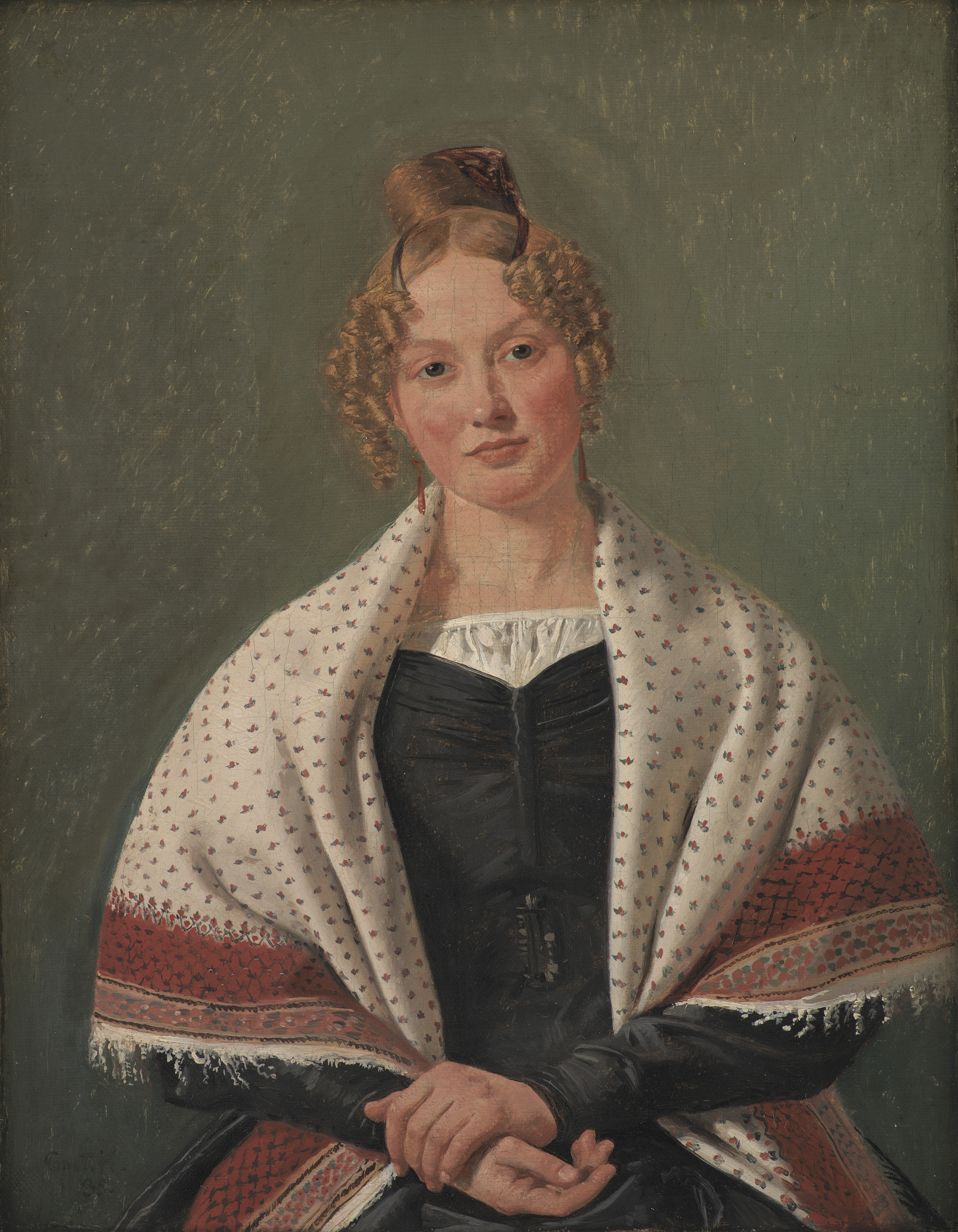
Constantin Hansen's portrait of Wegener's eldest daughter, Hanne Wanscher, née Wegener, 1835

Jens Ernst Wegener (5 October 1781 – 15 October 1846) was a Danish educator and pedagogical writer. He was principal of Jonstrup Seminarium outside Copenhagen from 1819 to 1838. He was the father of painter Gustav Theodor Wegener.

== Early life and education ==
Wegener was born in Odense, the son of Casper Frederich Wegener and Maren Jensdatter Staal. He later moved to Copenhagen.

== Career ==
Wegener succeeded Jacob Saxtorph as principal of Jonstrup Seminarium in 1819. He retired in 1838. Hans Christian Andersen mentions him in Mit livs eventyr.

== Family ==
Wegener married Birgitte Maria Bindesbøll (1797–1856), a sister of the architect Michael Gottlieb Bindesbøll. They had four children: Karen Johanne Juliane Wegener, Gustav Theodor Wegener, Marie Sophie Lovise Lund and Jacobe Henriette Catharina Wegener. His daughter Johanne (Hanne) was married to the paper merchant and art collector Wilhelm Wanscher.
