= Bianco Lunos Allé =

Street in Copenhagen, Denmark

Bianco Lunos Allé is a street in the Frederiksberg district of Copenhagen, Denmark. It runs from Gammel Kongevej in the south to a roundabout on Grundtvigsvej in the north.

== History ==
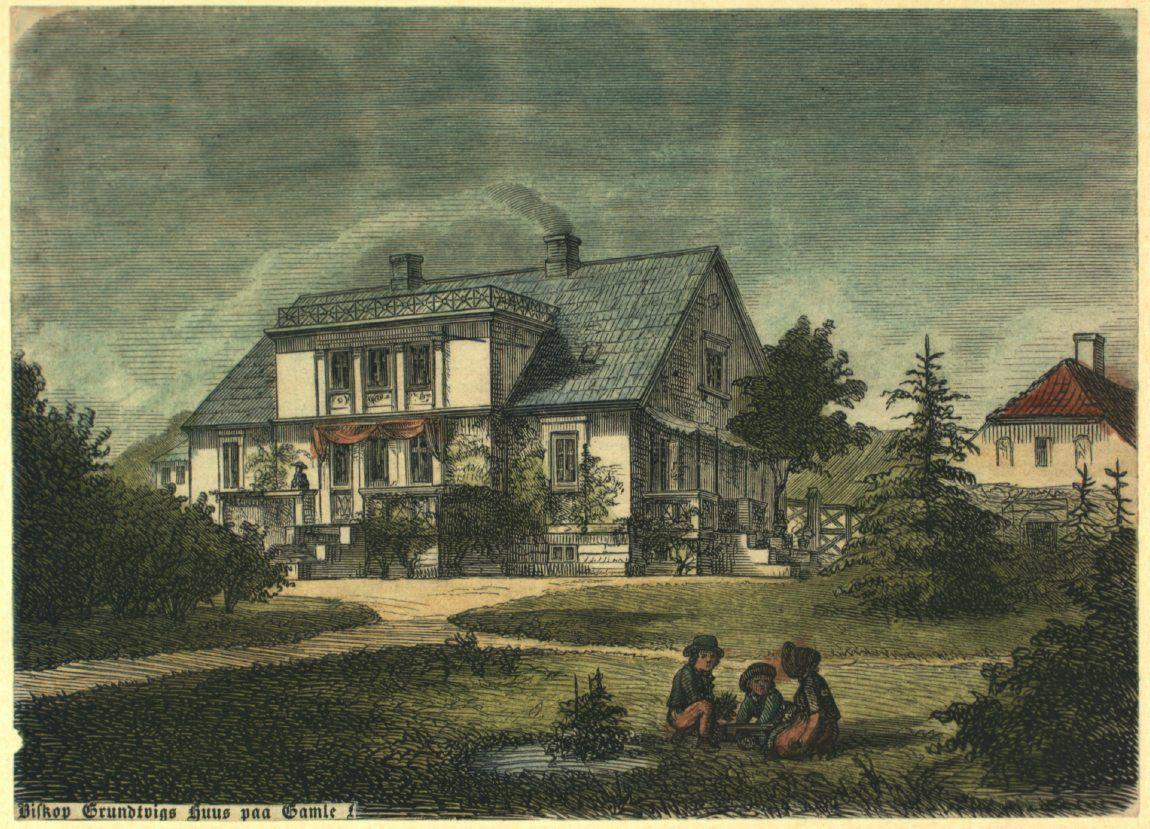
Christianshvile in 1861

The land at the site was in the first half of the 19th century owned by a farm named Christianshvile . It was in 1847 acquired by royal book printer Bianco Luno. He adapted the main building into a country house in around 1850 and sold most of the land off in lots prior to his death in 1852. This resulted in the creation of Bianco Lunos Allé as well as the perpendicular side street Bianco Lunos Sideallé.

Christianshvile was from 1860 to 1868 owned by N. F. S. Grundtvig. Bianco Lunos Side Allé was in 1879 renamed Grundtvigsvej in commemoration of Grundtvig who had died a couple of years earlier. Christianshvile's main building was demolished when the parallel streetHenrik Steffens Vejwas, one block further to the west, was created in 1907.

== Notable buildings ==
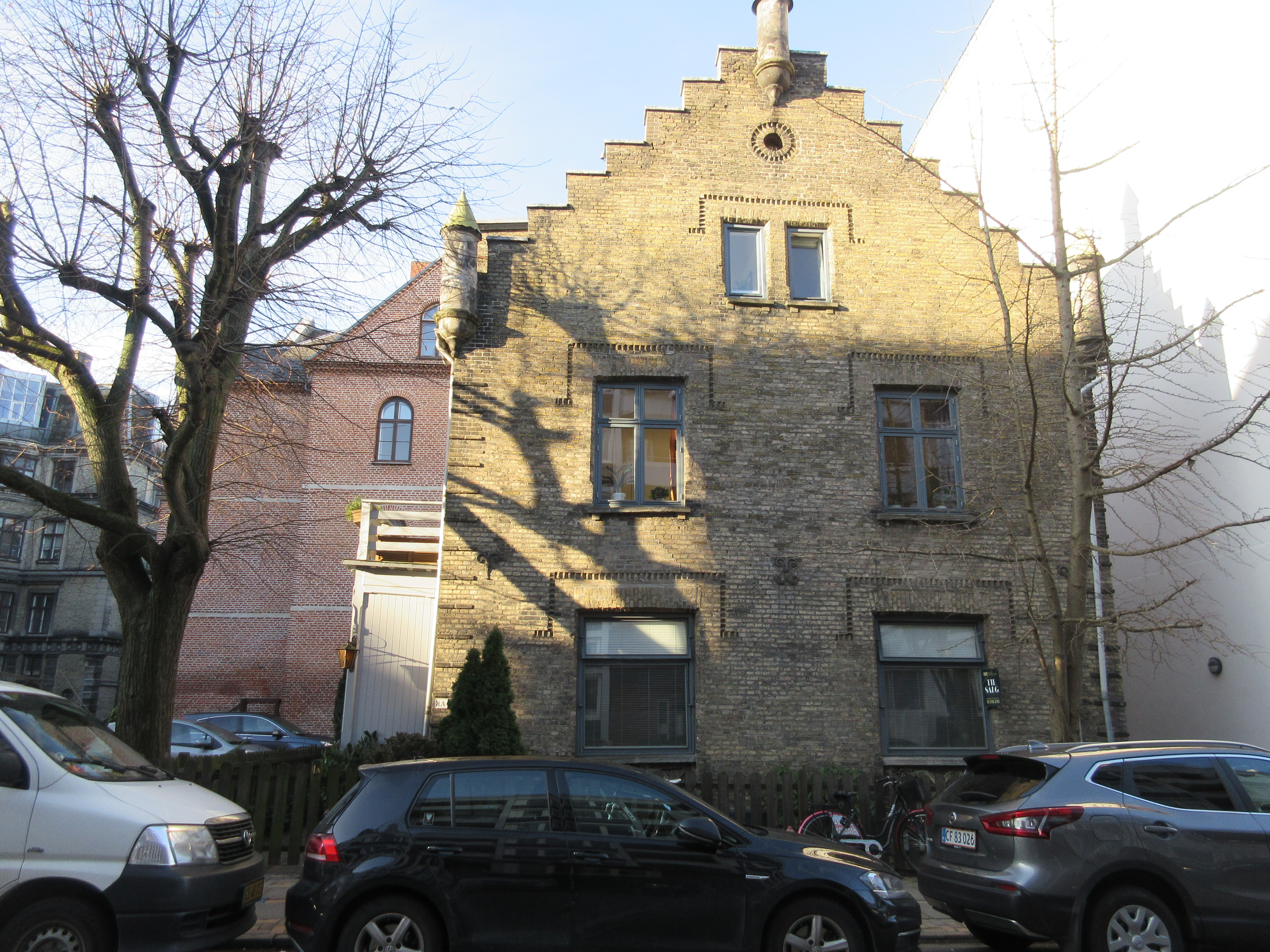
Bianco Lunos Allé 1A

The two-storey villa at No. 1A is from 1890.

== Cultural references ==
Herreskrædderiet at Bianco Lunos Allé 1, a tailor's shop, is in an episode of the YV2 sitcom Klovn frequented by Casper Christensen.

== See also ==
- Kochsvej
