= Lier IL =

Norwegian sports club

Home colours

Lier Idrettslag is a Norwegian multi-sports club from Tranby, Lier, Norway. It has sections for association football, team handball, Esports and Nordic skiing

The club was founded in 1931 as Lierskogen SBK and merged with Tranby IF (founded 1945) in 1955.

The men's football team currently plays in the Sixth Division, the seventh tier of Norwegian football. It contested the Third Division, the fourth tier, in 1994. The national-level referee Kristoffer Helgerud represents the club.
