= Bianco Luno =

Danish entrepreneur (1795–1852)

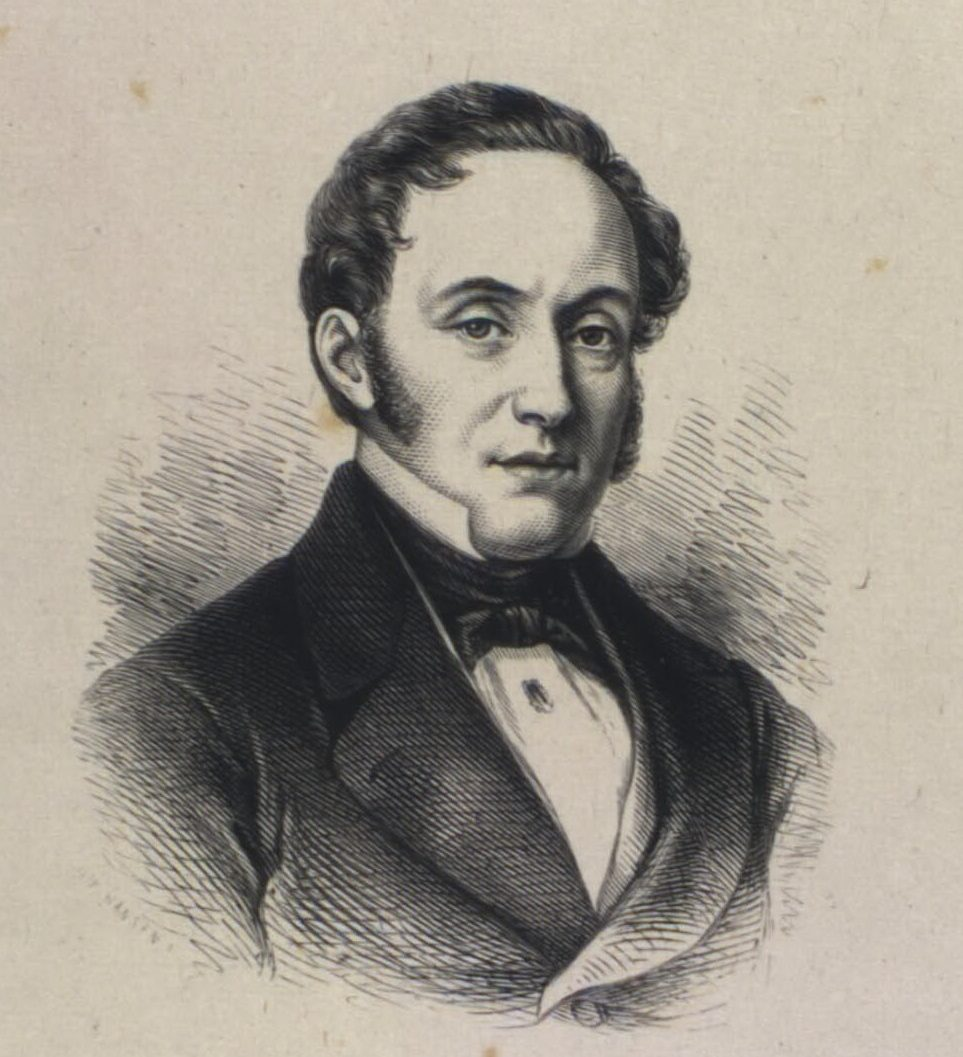
- Born: Christian Peter Bianco Luno; 6 June 1795; Randers, Denmark
- Died: 14 August 1852 (aged 57); Copenhagen, Denmark
- Occupation: Book printer

Bianco Luno (24 June 1795 – 14 August 1852) was a Danish book printer. His printing business, Bianco Lunos Bogtrykkeri, was at the time of his death in 1852 the largest company of its kind in Denmark.

== Early life and education ==
Luno was born on 24 June 1795 in Randers, the son of customs officer Jens Luno (1748–96) and Elisabeth Charlotte Boeck (1753–1815). He apprenticed as a book printer under Albert Borch in Aalborg 1811 to 1816 before moving to Copenhagen. In spring 1817 he left Denmark and spent the next 11 years working for a number of leading printing houses in Germany, Switzerland, Italy and Hungary.

== Career ==
On his return to Copenhagen in 1828, Luno had acquired a thorough knowledge of the latest trends and technological advances within the printing industry. In 1831, most likely with the help of Anders Sandøe Ørsted and Hans Christian Ørsted, he was awarded a royal license to set up his own printing business in Copenhagen. Lacking the needed capital, he entered into a partnership with typographer F. W. Schneider. Bianco Luno & Schneider started operations on 1 January 1832. The company was based at Pilestræde 8 and the machinery had been imported from Germany. Schneider left the company in 1837. Bianco Lunos Bogtrykkeri employed 40 people and several printing presses by the time that it relocated to larger premises at Østergade 2 in August 1838. A new and faster printing press (hurtigpresse) was acquired in 1840. Professor Christian Nathan David, who had made an investment in the company when Scheider pulled out, was instrumental in attracting many new clients from Copenhagen's literary and scientific elite. C. A. Reitzel's publishing house used Bianco Lunos Bogtrykkeri on a regular basis for the printing of numerous works by leading writers such as Hans Christian Andersen, Carsten Hauch, J. L. Heiberg, B. S. Ingemann, Frederik Paludan-Müller and Christian Winther. One of the finest publications from Luno's own time was Heiberg's Nye Digte (1841).

In 1847, Luno was awarded the title royal book printer. In 1848, he took over the responsibility for the printing of the constituent assembly's negotiations in a printing workshop at Christiansborg Palace.

Apprentices and former employees in the company include Carl Græbe, Chrsitian Sørensen and Carl B. Lorck.

== Personal life ==
Luno married twice. His first wife was Laurentze Wilhelmine Anger (17 February 1807 – 16 September 1839), a daughter of master brush-maker and later chief ticket inspector at the Royal Danish Theatre Samuel Anger (c. 1777–1843) and Vilhelmine Marie Henningsen (c. 1785–1870). They were married on 17 November 1838 in the Church of the Holy Ghost. His second wife was Johanne Marie Charlotte Kjer, (9 March 1817 – 7.11.1889), a daughter of sailor Lars Christensen Kjær and Christine Marie Lyssing. They were married on 13 April 1850.

Luno purchased the country house Christianssæde at Gammel Kongevej in 1847 and sold off most of the land in lots. Two streets were named after him: Bianco Lunos Allé still exists today, whereas Bianco Lunos Sideallé was renamed Grundtvigsvej in 1872.

He died on 14 August 1852 and is buried at Assistens Cemetery.

== Legacy ==
By the time of his death, Bianco Lunos Bogtrykkeri had by then grown to be the largest printing business in the country. It was continued by his widow under the management of his nephew Frederik Siegfred Muhle (1829–84) and Ferdinand Dreyer (1833–1924). Dreyer became the sole owner of the company in 1873. In 1900, it was acquired by A/S Carl Aller.

The street Bianco Lunos Allé in Frederiksberg is named after him.
