= 2021 Køge municipal election =

- 16 November 2021

All 27 seats to the Køge Municipal Council 14 seats needed for a majority
- Turnout: 33,418 (68.4%) ▼4.2pp
	First party	Second party	Third party
	A	V	C
Party	Social Democrats	Venstre	Conservatives
Last election	10 seats, 33.1%	6 seats, 20.4%	4 seats, 14.7%
Seats won	10	6	5
Seat change	0	0	▲1
Popular vote	10,429	7,532	5,508
Percentage	31.8%	22.9%	16.8%
Swing	▼1.3%	▲2.5%	▲2.1%
	Fourth party	Fifth party	Sixth party
	F	B	Ø
Party	Green Left	Social Liberals	Red–Green Alliance
Last election	3 seats, 10.2%	0 seats, 1.4%	1 seat, 4.6%
Seats won	2	1	1
Seat change	▼1	▲1	0
Popular vote	2,909	1,841	1,426
Percentage	8.9%	5.6%	4.3%
Swing	▼1.3%	▲4.2%	▼0.3%
	Seventh party	Eighth party	Ninth party
	D	O	I
Party	New Right	Danish People's Party	Liberal Alliance
Last election	0 seats, 1.7%	2 seats, 8.5%	1 seat, 2.9%
Seats won	1	1	0
Seat change	▲1	▼1	▼1
Popular vote	1,305	1,262	356
Percentage	4.0%	3.8%	1.1%
Swing	▲2.3%	▼4.7%	▼1.8%
Mayor before election
Marie Stærke
Social Democrats
Mayor after election
Marie Stærke
Social Democrats

For this election, Marie Stærke from the Social Democrats was seeking re-election and a fourth term, after having won the mayor's position following the last election.

In the election result, the Social Democrats would be the largest party with 10 seats against second-place Venstre who won 6 seats. Eventually Venstre ended giviving up on winning the mayor's position. Instead they reached an untraditional agreement with the Social Democrats, that would have Marie Stærke continue as mayor. Other parties in the agreement, included - the Green Left, Danish People's Party and the Red–Green Alliance.

== Electoral system ==
For elections to Danish municipalities, a number varying from 9 to 31 are chosen to be elected to the municipal council. The seats are then allocated using the D'Hondt method and a closed list proportional representation. Køge Municipality had 27 seats in 2021

Unlike in Danish General Elections, in elections to municipal councils, electoral alliances are allowed.

== Electoral alliances ==
=== Electoral Alliance 1 ===
Party		Political alignment
K	Christian Democrats	Centre to Centre-right
O	Danish People's Party	Right-wing to Far-right
V	Venstre	Centre-right

=== Electoral Alliance 2 ===
Party		Political alignment
B	Social Liberals	Centre to Centre-left
C	Conservatives	Centre-right

=== Electoral Alliance 3 ===
Party		Political alignment
D	New Right	Right-wing to Far-right
I	Liberal Alliance	Centre-right to Right-wing

=== Electoral Alliance 4 ===
Party		Political alignment
A	Social Democrats	Centre-left
F	Green Left	Centre-left to Left-wing
Ø	Red–Green Alliance	Left-wing to Far-Left
Å	The Alternative	Centre-left to Left-wing

== Results by polling station ==
Division	A	B	C	D	F	I	K	O	V	Ø	Å
Division	%	%	%	%	%	%	%	%	%	%	%
Køge By - Midt	28.7	5.1	26.9	2.7	9.8	1.4	0.1	2.7	18.4	3.8	0.5
Køge By - Vest	40.0	4.9	15.7	3.1	9.4	0.5	0.1	3.3	18.8	3.6	0.6
Lellinge	25.6	5.3	19.5	2.9	6.8	1.2	0.3	6.3	28.0	3.8	0.2
Højelse / Lille Skensved	32.3	4.7	16.0	6.2	9.6	1.3	0.5	5.1	19.5	3.7	1.0
Alkestrup	27.1	4.2	18.9	5.9	8.6	1.1	0.0	6.6	22.7	4.4	0.7
Herfølge	26.0	5.1	17.7	4.3	12.5	0.8	0.4	3.3	19.1	10.4	0.4
Ølsemagle	32.8	7.2	17.1	4.1	9.1	0.9	0.0	4.4	21.3	2.4	0.7
Ølby	39.5	8.4	13.1	3.4	7.8	1.1	0.2	4.1	18.4	3.5	0.4
Hastrup	40.0	4.1	17.6	2.7	10.7	0.8	0.3	3.6	15.9	3.4	0.9
Køge By - Nord	32.8	6.3	22.9	3.1	8.2	0.9	0.2	2.9	18.3	3.5	0.7
Herfølge - Syd	30.3	4.9	13.6	3.8	13.7	0.6	0.1	4.3	15.8	12.3	0.7
Borup	28.5	10.0	14.0	4.7	7.7	2.2	0.4	4.6	22.3	5.0	0.5
Vemmedrup	24.6	4.7	11.5	6.4	7.1	1.0	0.2	4.0	38.0	2.2	0.2
Bjæverskov	23.3	2.4	9.6	5.1	5.0	1.2	0.5	3.6	46.9	2.1	0.4
Gørslev	23.4	1.8	11.4	5.9	5.5	0.9	0.4	4.7	42.9	2.4	0.7
Ejby	26.7	3.7	12.1	5.5	5.9	1.1	0.0	3.8	37.1	3.5	0.7

== Results ==
Party		Votes	%	+/-	Seats	+/-
Køge Municipality
A	Social Democrats	11,116	33.06	+1.31	10	0
V	Venstre	6,844	20.36	-2.58	6	0
C	Conservatives	4,952	14.73	-2.04	4	-1
F	Green Left	3,447	10.25	+1.39	3	+1
O	Danish People's Party	2,870	8.54	+4.69	2	+1
Ø	Red-Green Alliance	1,545	4.60	+0.25	1	0
I	Liberal Alliance	962	2.86	+1.78	1	+1
D	New Right	572	1.70	-2.27	0	-1
B	Social Liberals	467	1.39	-4.22	0	-1
E	Nær-demokratiet	452	1.34	New	0	New
Å	The Alternative	274	0.82	+0.23	0	0
L	Demokratilisten	118	0.35	New	0	New
Total		33,619	100	N/A	27	N/A
Invalid votes		99	0.21	-0.08		
Blank votes		402	0.86	-0.18		
Turnout		34,120	72.65	+4.22		
Source: valg.dk
