= Franziska Carlsen =

Danish writer

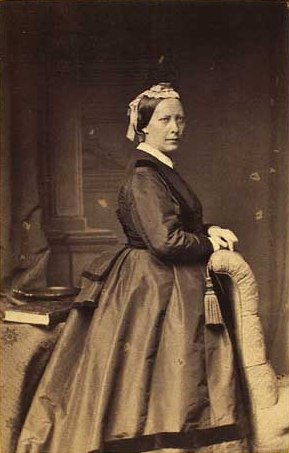
Franziska Carlsen

Franziska Antoinette Hilleborg Carlsen (13 November 1817 – 28 February 1876) was a Danish writer who was particularly interested in local history and folklore. She was also a keen collector of items of historical interest.

With the publication of her pioneering Noget om og fra Rønnebæk Sogn med Rønnebæksholm (Something about and from the parish of Rønnebæk and Rønnebæksholm Manor) in 1861, she became one of the few women of her times to publish works documenting local folklore.

== Biography ==
Born in Gammel Køgegård near Køge on 13 November 1817, Franziska Antoinette Hilleborg Carlsen was the daughter of the estate owner Christen Rasmus Carlsen (1777–1818) and his wife Else Margrethe née Nyhuus (1792–1857). She had at least two siblings: Hans Rasmussen Carlsen (1810–1887) and Marie Toft. Her sister Marie owned the Rønnebæksholm estate after the death of her first husband. Franziska spent her adult life mostly in Rønnebæksholm Manor and Vallø Castle. While still young, she developed a particular interest in local history and began to collect material for documenting the history of the area.

In 1861, she published Noget om og fra Rønnebæk Sogn med Rønnebæksholm, a pioneering contribution to topographical literature which also included songs, legends and accounts of local festivals. She also embarked on a highly detailed and well researched account of the history of Gammelkjægegaard og Omegn (Gammel Køgegård and Surroundings). The first volume was published posthumously in 1876 while the second volume appeared two years later. Her accounts titled Om Helgene, som Kirker og Stiftelser i Kjøge og Omegn have været indviede til (Saints to which churches and religious foundations in Køge and surroundings have been consecrated) were published in Volumes 5 and 6 of Ny kirkehistorie, Samlinger. She also published a number of studies documenting the history of Køge. Carlsen played an active part in church life and local politics.

Carlsen suffered a stroke on 26 February 1876, she died two days later on 28 February. She is buried at Claras Kirkegård at Gammel Køgegård.

== Works ==
- Noget om og fra Rønnebæk Sogn med Rønnebæksholm, 1861.
- Efterretninger om Gammelkjøgegaard og omegn, 2 vols., 1876–1878.
- "Om Helgene, som Kirker og Stiftelser i Kjøge og Omegn have været indviede til", 1871–1872.
