= Anders Petersen (historian) =

Danish historian (1827–1914)

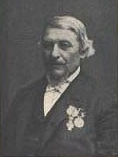
- Anders Petersen with his two medals
- Born: 22 December 1827; Bjæverskov
- Died: 13 August 1914 (aged 86); Copenhagen
- Education: Jonstrup Seminarium
- Occupations: Teacher, Writer
- Spouse: Olivia Anine Vilhemine née Ømann (married 1857)
- Children: Petrine Marie Isabella Petersen (19 February 1858); Agnes Theodora Elna Petersen (22 April 1860); Olga Dagmar Nicoline Petersen (14 June 1862); Thora Astrid Vilhelmine Petersen (19 September 1873)
- Writing career
- Language: Danish
- Notable awards: Cross of Honour of the Order of the Dannebrog, Silver medal of merit

Signature
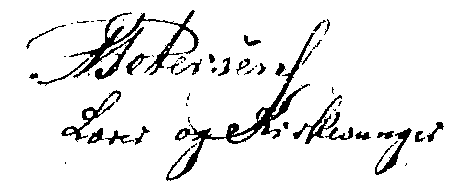

Anders Petersen (22 December 1827 – 13 August 1914) was a Danish school teacher and author of a range of historical, genealogical and statistical books.

== Early years ==
Anders Petersen was born in Bjæverskov, a town in Køge Municipality, as the youngest of four children of farmer Peter Nicolaisen and wife Marie Nilsdatter Bech.

He grew up with his family in the residence of the deacon of Bjæverskov, where his parents worked for the unmarried deacon. Since rural deacons were often school teachers as well, this may partly explain why he later became a teacher.

In 1842 he was confirmed as first in his class.

The deacon who had employed his parents died in May the same year, two months later at the age of 14 Anders Petersen started as an apprentice as a weaver in nearby Slimminge.

In May 1845 Anders Petersen had completed his apprenticeship. During the following years he worked as a weaver in various nearby villages except for November 1846, where he lived in Copenhagen. In November 1849 he returned to his parents in Bjæverskov. Since his father was over 60 and working as a day labourer he may have moved back to support his parents.

In 1850 he volunteered for the army and soon became a non-commissioned officer in the artillery.

The following year his father died, six years later his mother died.

== Family and Career Years ==
In 1852 he entered Jonstrup Seminarium on a stipend from Count Brockenhus Schack of Giesegaard to become a teacher and in 1855 he graduated.

On 12 June 1857 he married Olivia Anine Vilhemine Ømann in Garrison Church, Copenhagen.

From 1857 to 1886 he was a school teacher in Vallø by.

While living there he and his wife had four daughters, Petrine Marie Isabella Petersen (19 February 1858), Agnes Theodora Elna Petersen (22 April 1860), Olga Dagmar Nicoline Petersen (14 June 1862) and Thora Astrid Vilhelmine Petersen (19 September 1873).

On 25 June 1879 he was a Dannebrogsmand i.e. he had been awarded the Cross of Honour of the Order of the Dannebrog (Dannebrogsmændenes Hæderstegn).

In 1886 when his daughter Agnes married a teacher he was her best man as teacher and church singer.

In 1890 he had been awarded the silver medal of merit (fortjenstmedalje) and lived in Køge as a retired teacher with his wife and two unmarried daughters of whom the oldest (Petrine) was herself a teacher.

In 1891 he moved with his wife from Køge to Wesselsgade 13-2, Copenhagen as a retired teacher.

In 1901 two of his daughters had died.

After he retired Anders Petersen remained an active author.

== After his Death ==
Anders Petersen has a posthumous entry in the 1914 issue of Kraks Blå Bog as author and teacher.

The Danish National Archives has preserved some of his mail correspondence.

In 1991 a group of Danish historians led by J. Ingemann Pedersen raised the funds to reprint Anders Petersens book Sjællands Stifts Degnehistorie, which is very useful to genealogists but which had become very rare.

== Bibliography (selected) ==
- Petersen, Anders (1877). Skolestatistik, Skematisk Oversigt over Borger- og Almueskolen i Danmark (Kjøbenhavn undtaget) (in Danish).
- Petersen, Anders (1877). Vallø og Omegn, en historisk Skildring (in Danish). Gads Forlag. 380 pages.
- Petersen, Anders (1884–1891). Den jonstrupske Stat, personalhistoriske Meddelelser om det kgl. blaagaard-jonstrupske Seminariums Lærere og Dimittender 1790-1884, med Tillæg og Rettelser til 1891 (in Danish). 408 pages.
- Petersen, Anders (1887). Skolestatistik, Skematisk Oversigt over Borger- og Almueskolen i Danmark (in Danish).
- Petersen, Anders (1888). Kjøge Byes Historie, samlet efter trykte og utrykte Kilder (in Danish). Gads Forlag. 160 pages.
- Petersen, Anders (1889). Kortfattet topografisk-personal Vejviser for Landet, indeholdende Postadresser, Afstand for Kjøbstæder, Indbyggere, Gaardes og Huses Antal, Sognenes Hartkorn og Areal, Møller, Godser og større Gaarde tilligemed Navne paa Embeds, og Bestillingsmænd, Godsers og større Gaardes Ejere m.m. (in Danish). Gads Forlag. 368 pages.
- Petersen, Anders (1899). Sjællands Stifts Degnehistorie, et Bidrag til de svundne Aarhundreders Personal- og Kulturhistorie (in Danish). N. C. Roms Forlagsforretning, København. 248 pages.
- Petersen, Anders (1902). Folkeskolen i Danmark (in Danish).
- Petersen, Anders (1904). Slægten Ømann med indgiftede Familier (in Danish).
- Petersen, Anders (1907). Landeværnet og Slaget ved Kjøge Landevej den 29, August 1807 (in Danish). 111 pages.
- Petersen, Anders (1911). Stamtavle over min nærmeste Slægt (in Danish). 8 pages.
- Petersen, Anders (1913). En Livshistorie. Hvad jeg selv har oplevet (in Danish). 14 pages.
