= Nørre Dalby =

- Village
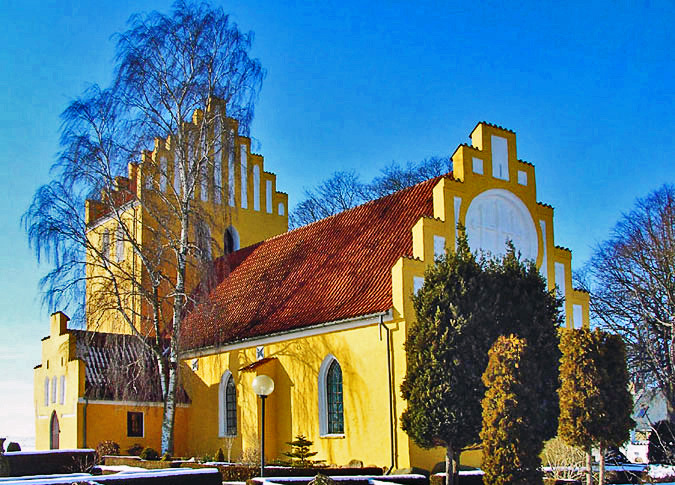
- Nørre Dalby Church

- Location in Region Zealand Nørre Dalby (Denmark)
- Coordinates: 55°28′53″N 12°0′29″E
- Country: Denmark
- Region: Region Zealand
- Municipality: Køge Municipality

Population (2026)
  - Total: 534

Nørre Dalby is a village, with a population of 534 (1 January 2026), in Køge Municipality, Region Zealand in Denmark. It is located 3 km southeast of Borup, 6 km north of Bjæverskov and 14 km west of Køge.

Nørre Dalby Church, a medieval church dating back to 1150–1200, is located in the village.
