= Marie Toft =

Danish landowner (1813–1854)

Ane Marie Elise Toft
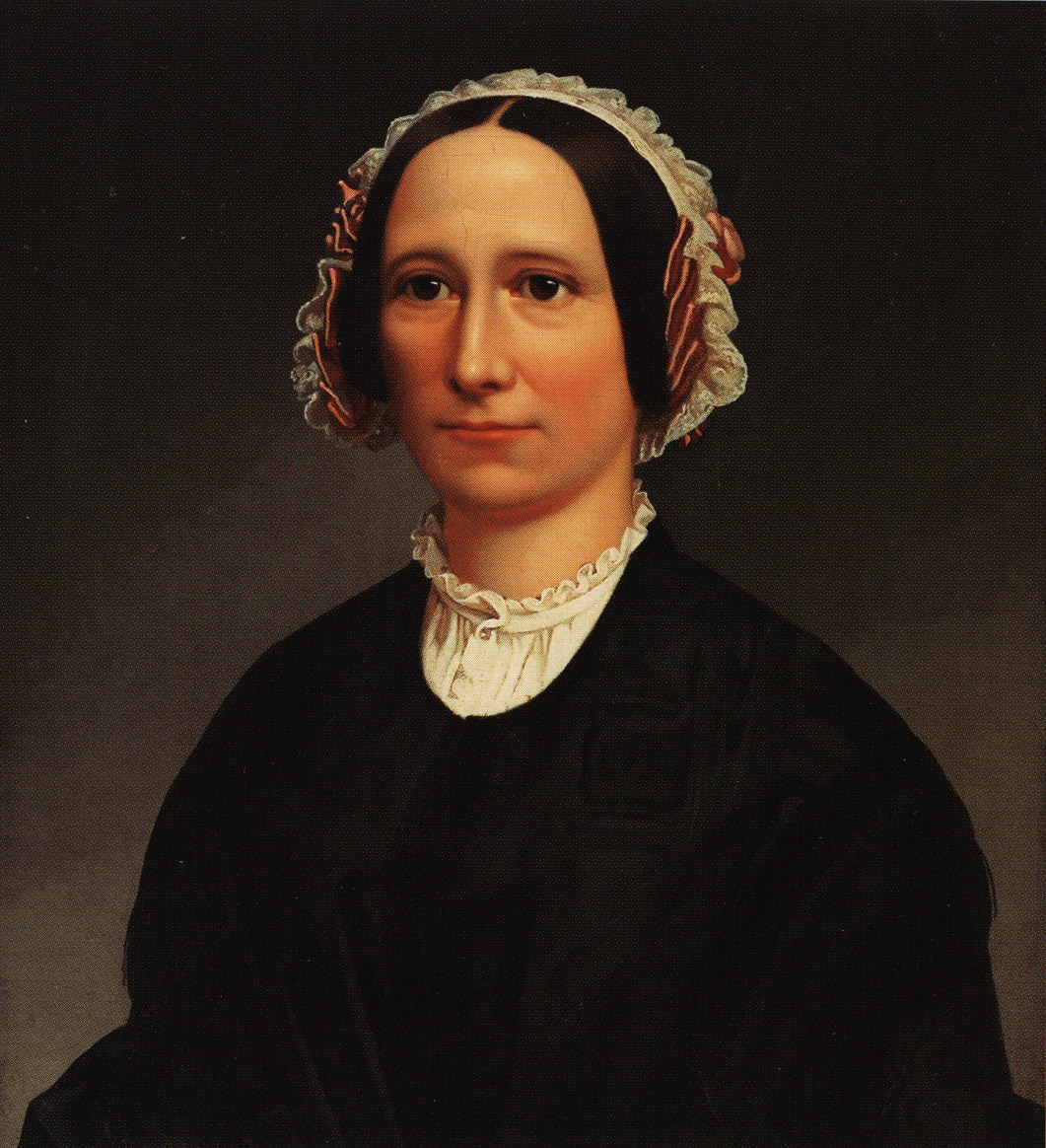
- Marie c. 1845.
- Born: Ane Marie Elise Carlsen; August 4, 1813; Gammel Køgegård, Køge, Denmark
- Died: July 9, 1854 (aged 41); Copenhagen, Denmark
- Burial place: Gammel Køgegård
- Spouses: Harald Toft (m. 1840, d. 1841); N.F.S. Grundtvig (m. 1851)
- Children: 2
- Relatives: Franziska Carlsen (sister)

Ane Marie Elise Toft, later Grundtvig, née Carlsen (4 August 1813 – 9 July 1854) was a wealthy Danish landowner who owned and efficiently administered the Rønnebæksholm estate near Næstved which she had inherited from her first husband following a marriage lasting less than two years. She opened up Rønnebæksholm to religious revivalists, attracting both clerics and laymen to the estate. In 1851, she married the influential philosopher, N.F.S. Grundtvig, who had visited the estate in 1846. Her manor house subsequently became one of the principal centres of Grundtvigian activity while Grundtvig became deeply devoted to Toft, treating her as his independent and spiritually equal partner.

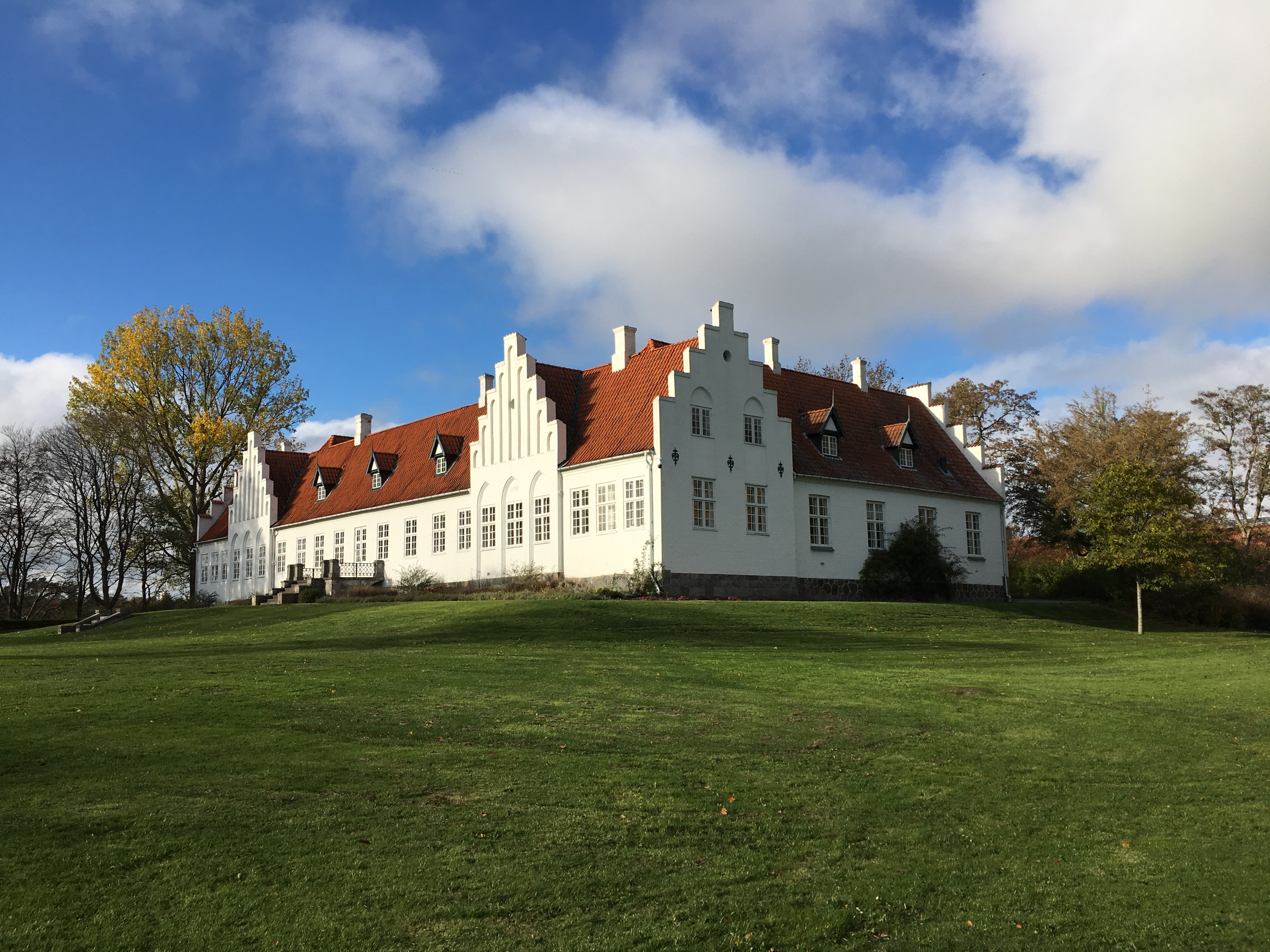
Rønnebæksholm

== Biography ==
Born on 4 August 1813 in the Gammel Køgegård manor near Køge, Ane Marie Elise Carlsen was the daughter of the estate owner and farmer Christen Rasmus Carlsen (1777–1818) and Else Margrethe Nyhuus (1792–1857). She was brought up on the estate together with her younger sister Franziska (1817–1876), who became a historian, and her elder brother Hans (1810–1887), a politician. When she was 26, on 9 June 1840, she married Harald Peter Nicolai Toft (1812–1841) who bought the Rønnebæksholm estate a few weeks later on 16 July. He carried out repairs and had the main building rebuilt. Harald Toft, who had earlier suffered from a serious chest infection in Paris, died on 24 November 1841. The couple had spent only nine months together at Rønnebæksholm. Their daughter Haralda was born after her father's death on 17 February 1842.

Following her husband's death, Toft inherited the manor house and continued to live there with her daughter. She took good care of the building and the estate, efficiently managing the farming work. She also improved the living conditions of her tenants, allowing some to acquire the properties in which they were living. She became a popular figure in the area, thanks to her friendly, welcoming attitude and her unusual sophistication. As a widow interested in religious revival, she became a figurehead for revivalists in southern Zealand, both commoners and clerics. Her large religious meetings at Rønnebæksholm in collaboration with the parish priest of Herfølge, J.W. Willemoes, were large enough to annoy Bishop J.P. Mynster.

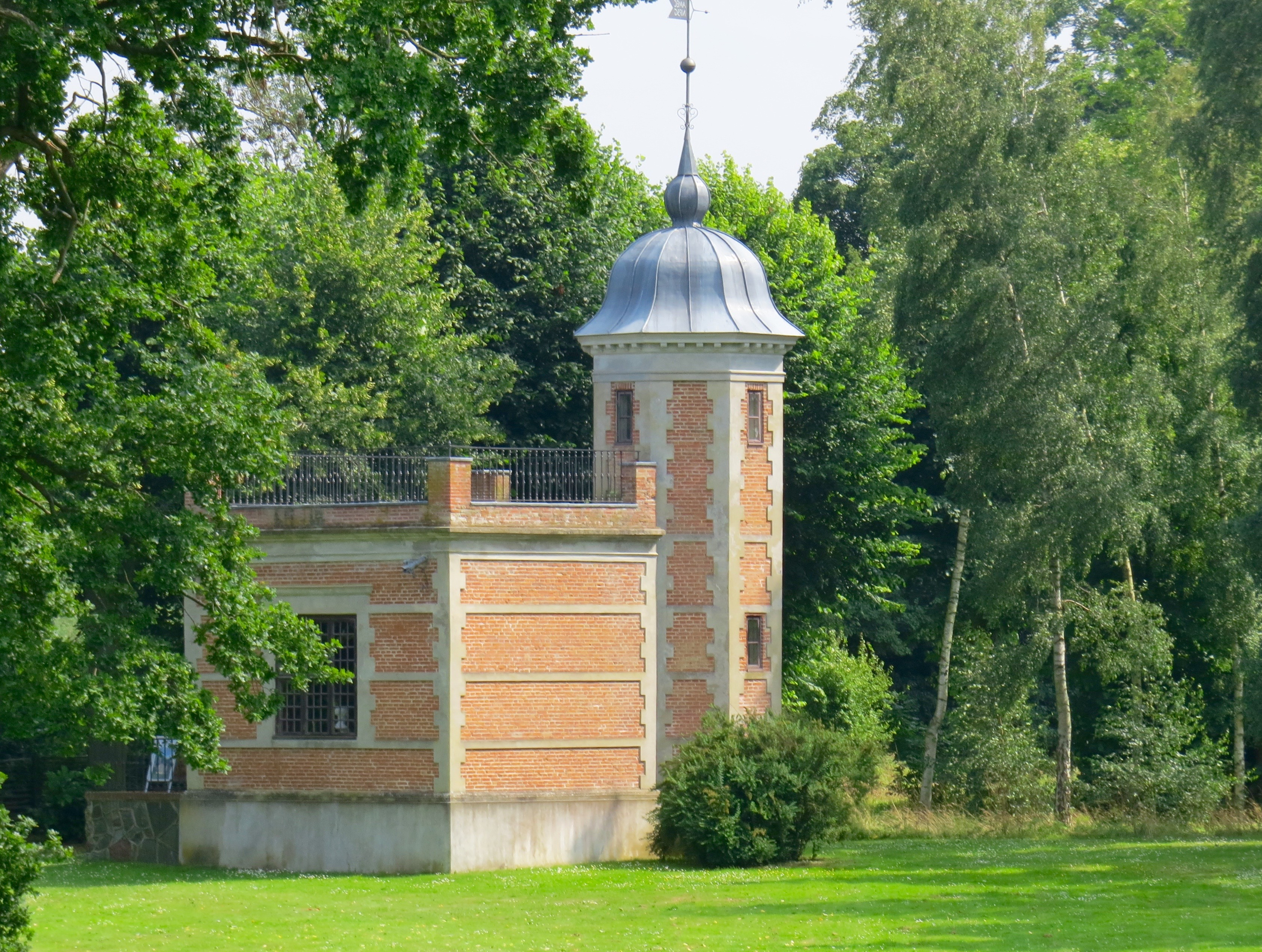
The Venligheden (friendship) pavilion

In the winter of 1845–46, Toft visited Grundtvig at his home in Copenhagen together with his former student Willimoes. Given the bishops attitude, she was keen to hear his views on revival meetings, especially those at Rønnebæksholm. Their discussion was inconclusive but she had obviously impressed Grundtvig, making a further meeting inevitable. This occurred the following autumn, in connection with an address by Grundtvig in Næstved.

Grundtvig made several more visits to Rønnebæksholm, contributing to its attraction as a focus for religious meetings. His affection for Toft grew steadily but he was unable to marry her as long as his wife Lise was living. After being bedridden for several months, Lise died in January 1851. Grundtvig was therefore able to marry Toft on 21 October 1851 in Brøndbyvester Church. He was 67 and Toft was still only 37. Toft built a pavilion for him near the Rønnebæksholm manor where he could work. She called it "Venligheden" (friendship). The couple enjoyed a happy marriage, as can be seen from the love poem "Hvad er det, min Marie" he wrote for her.

Their marriage did not last long. After giving birth to their son Frederik on 15 May, she died of breast cancer two months later on 9 July 1854 in Copenhagen. Following her own wishes, she was entombed in the grounds of Gammel Køgegaard. When he died 18 years later following a third marriage, Grundtvig was entombed beside her. Grundtvig named his first folk high school Marielyst in her memory. Opened in 1856, it was initially located in Copenhagen.
