= Ejby, Køge =

Ejby
- Town
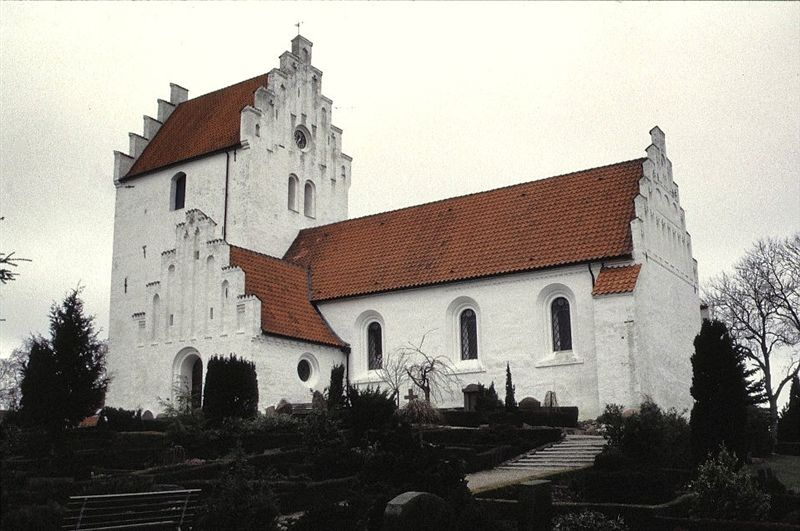
- Ejby Church

- Location in Denmark Ejby (Denmark Region Zealand)
- Coordinates: 55.4887°N 12.0795°E
- Country: Denmark
- Region: Zealand (Sjælland)
- Municipality: Køge

Area
  - Urban: 1.73 km^{2} (0.67 sq mi)

Population (2026)
  - Urban: 3,148
  - Urban density: 1,820/km^{2} (4,710/sq mi)
  - Gender: 1,539 males and 1,609 females
- Time zone: UTC+1 (CET)
  - Summer (DST): UTC+2 (CEST)
- Postal code: DK-4623 Lille Skensved

Ejby is a town in Køge Municipality, with a population of 3,148 (1 January 2026), on the Danish island of Zealand. The town is located about 8 kilometres/5 miles west of the town of Køge.

== History ==
Since the 1960s, when Ejby was a small village with a population of only a few hundreds, the village has grown rapidly and is now surrounded by residential areas of single-family detached homes and terraced houses.

The first privately run kindergarten in Denmark, Gemsevejens Kindergarten (Danish: Gemsevejens Børnehus), which was outsourced to ISS A/S in 1998, is located in Ejby. Today the kindergarten is operated by the TitiBo group.

== Ejby Church ==
Ejby Church, is a typical Danish village church from the 12th century. it is located on the western outskirts of the old original village.
