= Michael Qureshi =

Danish journalist

- Born: May 4, 1979 (age 45); Køge, Denmark
- Education: Journalist
- Years active: 1999-

Michael Qureshi (born 4 May 1976 in Køge) is a Danish journalist.

In December 2015 he was dismissed and expelled from the Danish newspaper Ekstra Bladet, when it was revealed that Qureshi had used fake sources for several years. Subsequently, well over 500 articles from various media in Denmark withdrawn when the credibility of these could not be corroborated.

It was Michael Qureshi as in the summer of 2015 wrote the first biography of the Norwegian football player Martin Ødegaard. It was published by the Norwegian publisher Publicom.

== Bibliography ==
- Martin Ødegaard, Michael Qureshi, Publicom, 2015
