= Rønnebæk =

- Village
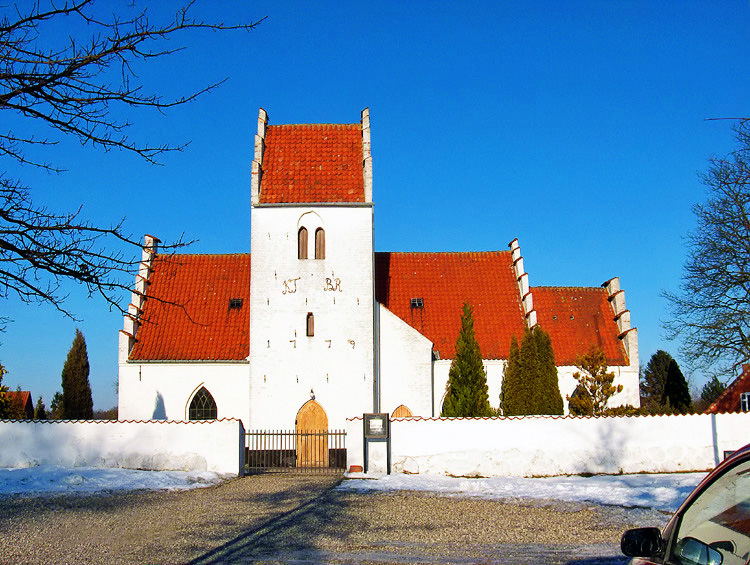
- Rønnebæk Church

- Location in Denmark Rønnebæk (Denmark)
- Coordinates: 55°13′0″N 11°48′37″E
- Country: Denmark
- Region: Region Zealand
- Municipality: Næstved Municipality

Population (2026)
  - Total: 580

Rønnebæk is a village and small satellite community to Næstved, with a population of 580 (1 January 2026), in Næstved Municipality, Region Zealand in Denmark. It is located 5 km southeast of central Næstved.

Rønnebæk Church is located in the village.

The former manor house Rønnebæksholm is located 1 km west of the village.
