= Bjæverskov =

- town
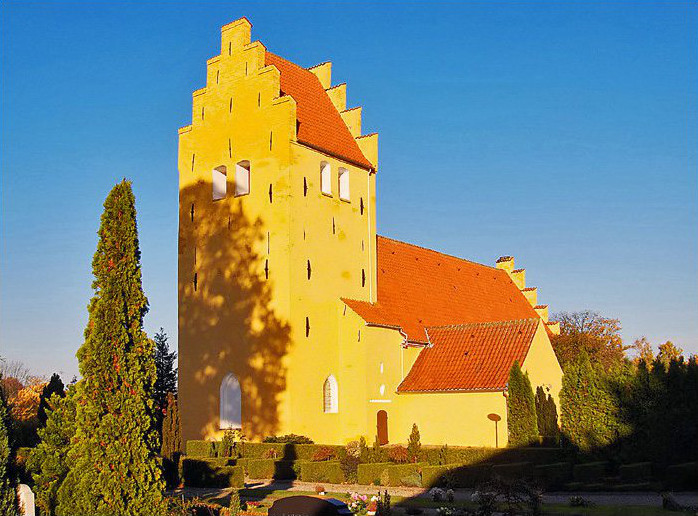
- Bjæverskov church

- Location in Denmark Bjæverskov (Denmark Region Zealand)
- Coordinates: 55°27′36″N 12°01′27″E
- Country: Denmark
- Region: Zealand (Sjælland)
- Municipality: Køge

Area
  - Urban: 1.9 km^{2} (0.73 sq mi)

Population (2026)
  - Urban: 3,279
  - Urban density: 1,700/km^{2} (4,500/sq mi)
  - Gender: 1,624 males and 1,655 females
- Time zone: UTC+1 (CET)
  - Summer (DST): UTC+2 (CEST)
- Postal code: DK-4632 Bjæverskov

Bjæverskov is a town in Køge Municipality, with a population of 3,279 (1 January 2026) at the road between Køge and Ringsted about 10 kilometres west of Køge and 16 kilometres/10 miles east of Ringsted.

== History ==
In the Middle Ages an estate was located just west of Bjæverskov church. In 1999 Køge Museum made an archeological excavation on the site when Bjæverskovskatten (The Bjæverskov Treasure), a three-legged ore pot containing approx. 2550 coins and some jewelry from about 1254-59, was found.

== Notable people ==
- Anders Petersen (1827 in Bjæverskov – 1914) a school teacher and author of historical, genealogical and statistical books
- David Borchersen (born 1978 at Bjæverskov) a cricketer, a right-handed batsman who bowls right-arm medium pace
- Anita Madsen (born 1995) a Danish former competitive figure skater, lives in Bjæverskov
