= Hastrup =

Danish neighborhood

Coordinates: 55.44138°N 12.16564°E

Hastrup is a neighbourhood of Køge in Denmark located 2 to 3 kilometres south of central Køge.
