= Køge Municipality =

Køge Municipality Køge Kommune (Danish)
- Municipality
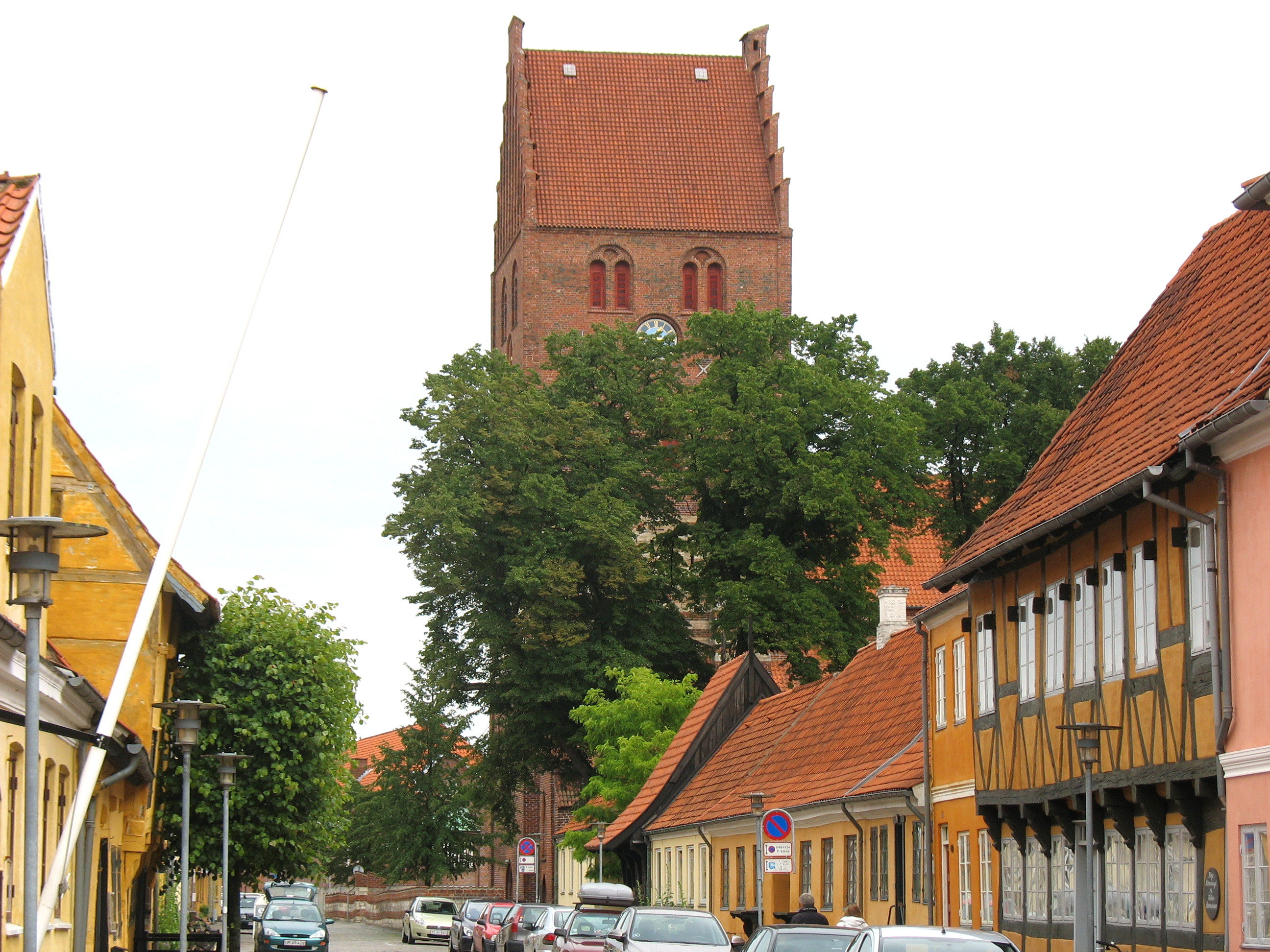
- A street in Køge

- Coat of arms

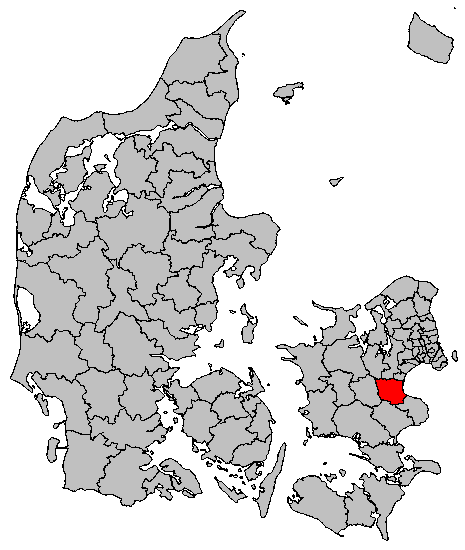
- Coordinates: 55°27′N 12°11′E
- Country: Denmark
- Region: Zealand
- Established: 1 January 2007
- Seat: Køge

Government
  - Mayor: Ken Kristensen (V)

Area
  - Total: 255.47 km^{2} (98.64 sq mi)

Population (1 January 2026)
  - Total: 63,962
  - Density: 250.37/km^{2} (648.46/sq mi)
- Time zone: UTC+1 (CET)
  - Summer (DST): UTC+2 (CEST)
- Municipal code: 259
- Website: www.koege.dk

Køge Municipality (Danish: Køge Kommune, Danish pronunciation: [ˈkʰøː(j)ə]) is a kommune in the Region Sjælland on the east coast of the island of Zealand approx. 40 km southwest of Copenhagen. The municipality covers an area of 255 km^{2} (98 sq. miles), and has a total population of 63,962 (2026). Until January 2007, its mayor was Torben Hansen, a member of the Social Democrats (Socialdemokraterne) political party, who died while still in office. He was replaced by Marie Stærke, who at age 27 was Denmark's youngest mayor at that time.

The main town and the site of its municipal council is the town of Køge. Suburbs inside the urban area of Køge include Køge Nord (Ølby Lyng and Ølsemagle Lyng) to the north and Herfølge to the south. Towns inside the municipality but outside the central urban area include Borup, Ejby, Bjæverskov, Lille Skensved, Lellinge and Algestrup.

As a result of Kommunalreformen ("The Municipal Reform" of 2007), on 1 January 2007, the prior Køge municipality was merged with Skovbo Municipality to form the new Køge municipality.

== Urban areas ==
The ten largest urban areas in the municipality are:

| # | Locality | Population |
|---|---|---|
| 1 | Køge | 38,840 |
| 2 | Borup | 5.063 |
| 3 | Bjæverskov | 3,279 |
| 4 | Ejby | 3,148 |
| 5 | Vemmedrup | 1,657 |
| 6 | Lille Skensved | 1,630 |
| 7 | Algestrup | 952 |
| 8 | Lellinge | 769 |
| 9 | Ølsemagle | 735 |
| 10 | Nørre Dalby | 534 |

== Politics ==
Køge's municipal council consists of 27 members, elected every four years.

=== Municipal council ===
Below are the municipal councils elected since the Municipal Reform of 2007.

| Election | Party | | | | | | | | | | | Total seats | Turnout | Elected mayor |
|---|---|---|---|---|---|---|---|---|---|---|---|---|---|---|
| Election | A | B | C | D | F | I | I | O | U | V | Ø | Total seats | Turnout | Elected mayor |
| 2005 | 11 | 1 | 2 | | 1 | 1 | | 3 | | 8 | | 27 | 70.2% | Marie Stærke (A) |
| 2009 | 9 | | 4 | 2 | 4 | | | 2 | | 6 | | 27 | 75.9% | Marie Stærke (A) |
| 2013 | 7 | | 2 | | 2 | | | 3 | 1 | 10 | 2 | 27 | 71.8% | Flemming Christensen (C) |
| 2017 | 10 | | 4 | | 3 | | 1 | 2 | | 6 | 1 | 27 | 72.6% | Marie Stærke (A) |
Data from Kmdvalg.dk 2005, 2009, 2013 and 2017

== Sister cities and towns ==
| Dundaga, Latvia; Espoo, Finland; Klaipėda, Lithuania; Kongsberg, Norway | Kristianstad, Sweden; Saudarkrokur, Iceland; Sjöbo, Sweden; Trittau, Germany |
