= Gammel Køgegård =

Manor house in Køge Municipality, Denmark

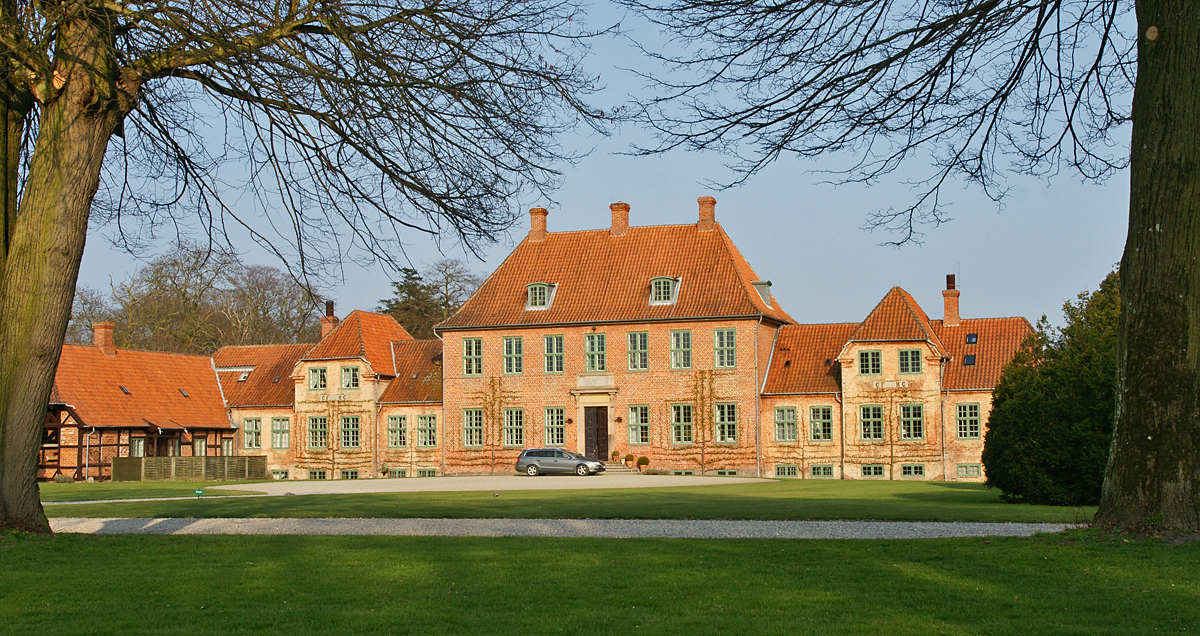
- Gammel Køgegård
- Interactive map of the Gammel Køgegård area

General information
- Architectural style: Neoclassical
- Location: Køge, Denmark
- Coordinates: 55°27′34.08″N 12°9′55.75″E
- Construction started: 1791
- Renovated: 1856

Gammel Køgegård is a manor house located just west of Køge, Denmark.

== History ==
=== Early history ===
Originally, Køge was located in the grounds of present-day Gammel Køgegård, approximately 1 km inland from the current town centre. Remains of a church have been found in the orchard of the estate. When sedimentation made the beach and marshlands along the coast suitable for building, the settlement relocated to the bay and Old Køge shrank to a few scattered houses.

Little is known about the earliest history of Gammel Køgegård. It was acquired by the noble Bille family in the 16th century. In 1603, Elisabeth Bille, who had inherited the family's possessions in Old Køge from her father, started construction of a house which would stand at the site for almost two hundred years.

Later in the century, the estate came under the ownership of the Skeel family and grew considerably.

=== The current house ===
In 1776 the property was acquired by Rasmus Carlsen, a local farmer and merchant, and his son Christen Rasmussen-Carlsen was in 1817 ennobled under the name Lange.

Christen Carlsen Lange's son, Hans Carlsen (1810–1887) took over the estate in 1833 from his mother, who had become a widow in 1818. In 1841 he was appointed Hofjægermester and shortly after married Clara Sophie Krag-Juel-Vind-Frijs (1822–1852) from Frijsenborg. The couple had three daughters and a son. Active in politics, Hans Carlsen Lange was a member of the Landstinget, appointed by the king, and briefly, in the Cabinet of Monrad, served as Minister of Interior Affairs.

Hans Carlsen's wife Clara died in 1852, and their son Jens Christen died just 19 years old in 1865. Their daughter Emmy therefore took over the estate after her father's death in 1887. She founded the Carlsen-Lange Family Trust which took over the property following her own death in 1912.

The property was listed in 1964.

== Architecture ==
The current Neoclassical main building dates from 1791. It consists of a two-storey main wing built in red brick under a red tile roof and two lower lateral wings. The latter were altered in 1856. An interconnected wing with timber framing is the only preserved part of the previous complex from 1603.

== Clara's Graveyard ==
The house is located in a park which is dissected by Køge Å. The park was redesigned with the assistance of C.Th. Sørensen in 1967. It contains one of the largest collections of rhododendrons in Denmark with many rare varieties.

East of Køge Å, about half a kilometre from the main building, lies Clara's Graveyard, a family burial ground named after Hans Carlsen's wife Clara Carlsen who died on 26 December 1852. It was inaugurated on the occasion of her funeral by titular bishop N. F. S. Grundtvig who had married Hans Carlsen's sister the previous year. A crypt was constructed at the site in 1855 which is the resting place of several family members, including Hans Carlsen's sister and Grundtvig. The last member of the family to be buried at the graveyard was Emmy Carlsen who died in 1912.

The park is open to the public every Wednesday, Saturday and Sunday from 14–18. Clara's Graveyard is open to visitors on 15 May (Emmy Carlsen's birthday) and 8 September (Grundtvig's birthday) every year, although only by prior arrangement with the estate office.

== Today ==
The estate is still owned by the Carlsen-Lange Foundation. It covers 625 hectares of forest and 350 hectares of farmland. The town of Køge runs a nature school in one of the buildings on the estate.

There is no public access to the main building which contains a collection of portrait paintings of the estate's owners from the 16th until the 20th century.

== Cultural references ==
In episode 16 of the television series, Gammel Køgegaard is used as a location for the home of Jytte's mother, where Alf Thyregod pays her a visit.
