= Rønnebæksholm =

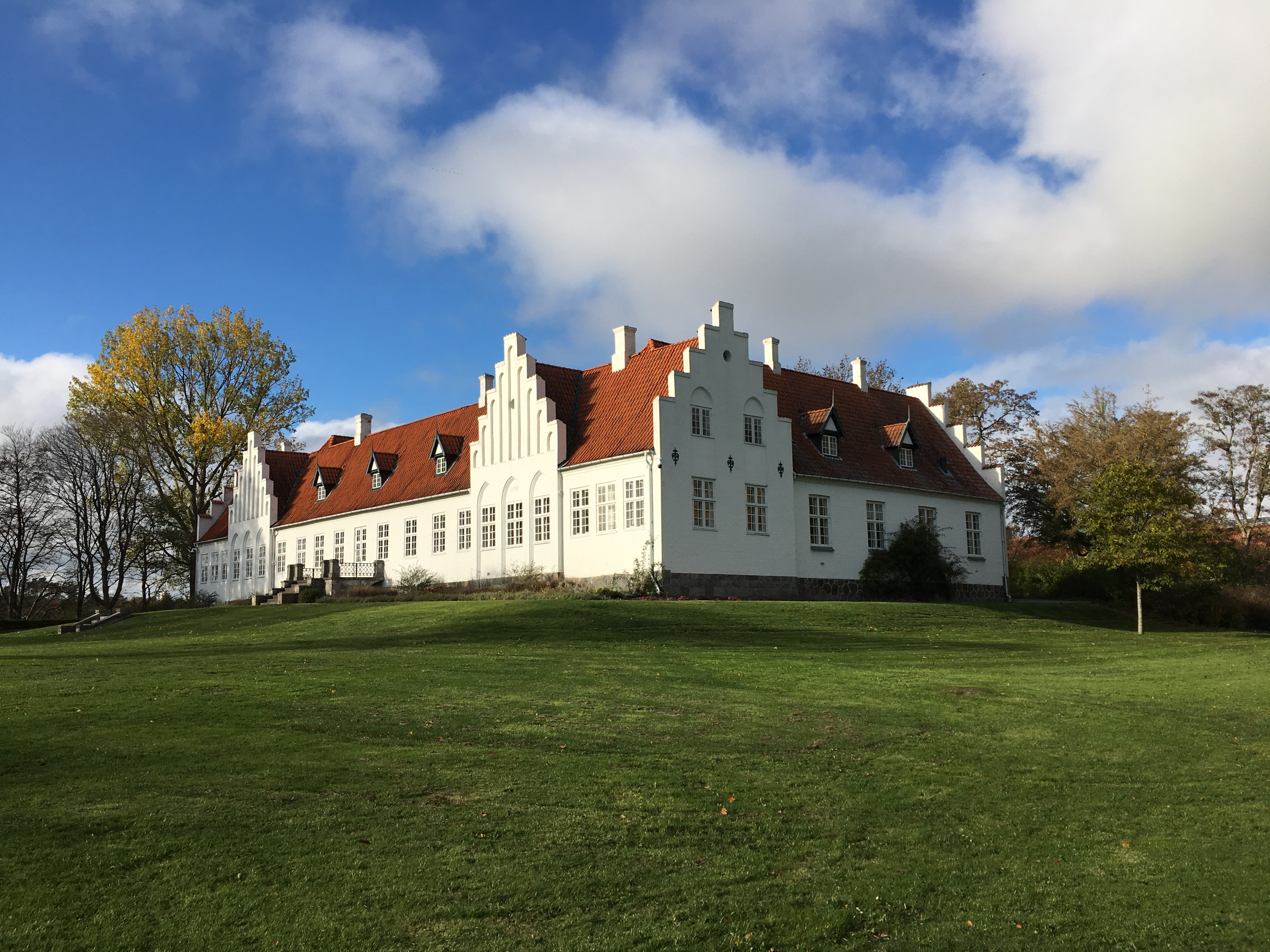
- The main building viewed from the garden

General information
- Location: Næstved Municipality
- Address: Rønnebæksholm 1, 4700 Næstved
- Country: Denmark
- Coordinates: 55°13′14″N 11°47′39″E
- Completed: 1734

Website
- https://roennebaeksholm.dk/

Rønnebæksholm is a former manor house located just outside Næstved in south-eastern Denmark. The estate covers 230.5 hectares of land. It was acquired by Næstved Municipality in 1998 and is now run as a cultural centre, hosting a wide range of cultural events, both indoor and outdoor, including art exhibitions, concerts, talks and theatrical performances.

Today, the Rønnebæksholm Arts and Culture Centre is a self-owning institution. The main building plays host to four to six exhibitions. The emphasis is on modern and contemporary visual arts.

== History ==
The estate is first mentioned in written sources dating back to 1321. Although the Due noble family had formerly owned the estate, from 1321 until 1399 it was owned by members of the Moltke family. In 1399, Fikke Moltke ceded the property to Margaret I, and it then remained in possession of the Danish monarchy until the 16th century.

In 1513, Christian II had Gert Bøsseskytte construct Denmark's first gunpowder factory on the estate lands. In 1571 the estate ceased to be a possession of the crown when Frederick II granted the lands to Caspar Paslick, a diplomat and nobleman. It remained in the Paslick family for three generations, until it was sold by Knud Paslick to Edel Urne in 1646. The estate was passed down to descendants of Edel Urne and her husband Pros Mund until 1727, when the family was forced to auction off the property. It was acquired by Johan Rantzau Mund and then Christoffer Tage. Tage was the first owner of the estate that was not a member of the nobility. Under his ownership, parts of the main building were renovated and the estate acquired several adjoining properties. Tage sold the property to Jens Müller in 1750, who owned the estate for just three years until his death. His widow, Barbara Marie Munthe, passed ownership of the property to her second husband, Christian Walterstorff.

The estate was then briefly owned by Carl Juel, before it was purchased in 1761 by Peter Collet. Peter died in 1763 after falling from his horse, and ownership was passed to his brother, Johan Collet. Johan sold the property in 1777 to Magnus Beringskjold, who was later accused of high treason and arrested Rønnebæksholm in 1781. He spend the rest of his life imprisoned at Bergenhus Fortress. After his arrest, the estate became property of his wife, Marie Christine von Cappelen. In 1782, she formally sold it to their son, Ditlev Beringskiold, who the following year was ennobled as Ditlev Wedelsparre for his faithful service to the crown, thus renouncing his father's name. Wedelsparre sold the property in 1798 to Joachim Moltke, who owned it until his death in 1820. It was then inherited by his widow, Ellen Brun de Neergaard who lived on the estate for 10 years until she sold it.

In 1840, the property was acquired by Harald Toft. That same year, he married Ane Marie Elise Carlsen and renovated the main building in a neo-gothic style. He died the next year, and his widow took charge of the estate. Marie was a well-known figure in theological circles and met N. F. S. Grundtvig around 1845. Marie and Grundvig married on 25 October 1851, less than a year after the death of his first wife. Marie had a pavilion built in the southeast corner of the estate for Grundtvig, but died before it was completed. On 15 May 1854, the couple's only child, Frederik Lange Grundtvig was born, and Marie died a few weeks later. Before marrying Grundtvig, she had bequeathed her entire estate to her daughter Haralda. After her death, the property therefore came into Haralda's ownership and Grundtvig moved out from the manor. The estate was passed down to successive decedents of Haralda Toft and her husband Peter Ferdinand Collet until it became public property. By the end of the 19th century, the vast majority of the village of Rønnebæk, except for a few ecclesiastical buildings, was owned by the estate.

The main building and stables were acquired by director Keld Riff Andersen in 1966. Næstved Municipality then acquired the surrounding land in 1994, and the main building and stables from Keld Riff Andersen in 1998.

=== List of owners ===
- Fikke Moltke (1350–1399)
- The crown (1399–1571)
- Caspar Paslick (1571–1597)
- Frederik Paslick (1597–1627)
- Knud Paslick (c. 1634–1646)
- Edel Urne (1646–1653)
- Niels Mund (1653–1723)
- Niels Vind (1723–1727)
- Johan Rantzau Mund (1727)
- Christoffer Tage (1727–1750)
- Jens Müller (1750–1753)
- Barbara Marie Müller née Munthe (1753–)
- Christian Walterstorff (–1755)
- Carl Juel (1755–1761)
- Peder Collet (1761–1763)
- Johan Collet (1763–1777)
- Magnus Beringskiold (1777–1781)
- Marie Christine von Cappelen (1781–1782)
- Ditlev Wedelsparre (1782–1798)
- Joachim Moltke (1798–1820)
- Ellen Brun de Neergaard (1820–)
- Harald Toft (1841–1842)
- Marie Toft née Carlsen (1842–1854)
- Haralda Toft (1854–1869)
- Peter Ferdinand Collet (1869–1896)
- Holger Peter Harald Collet (1896–1942)
- Polly Collet née Hegermann-Lindecrone (1942–1945)
- Carl Frederik Collet (1945–1975)
- Keld Riff Andersen (1966–1998, only estate building)
- Else Collet (1975–1985, estate lands)
- Peter Collet (1985–1994, estate lands)
- Næstved Municipality (1994–1998, estate lands)
- Næstved Municipality (1998–present, whole estate)

== Architecture ==
The three-winged building which exists today was originally constructed in 1734. This structure was remodelled in 1840–41 and again 1889–90.

=== Grundtvig Pavilion ===
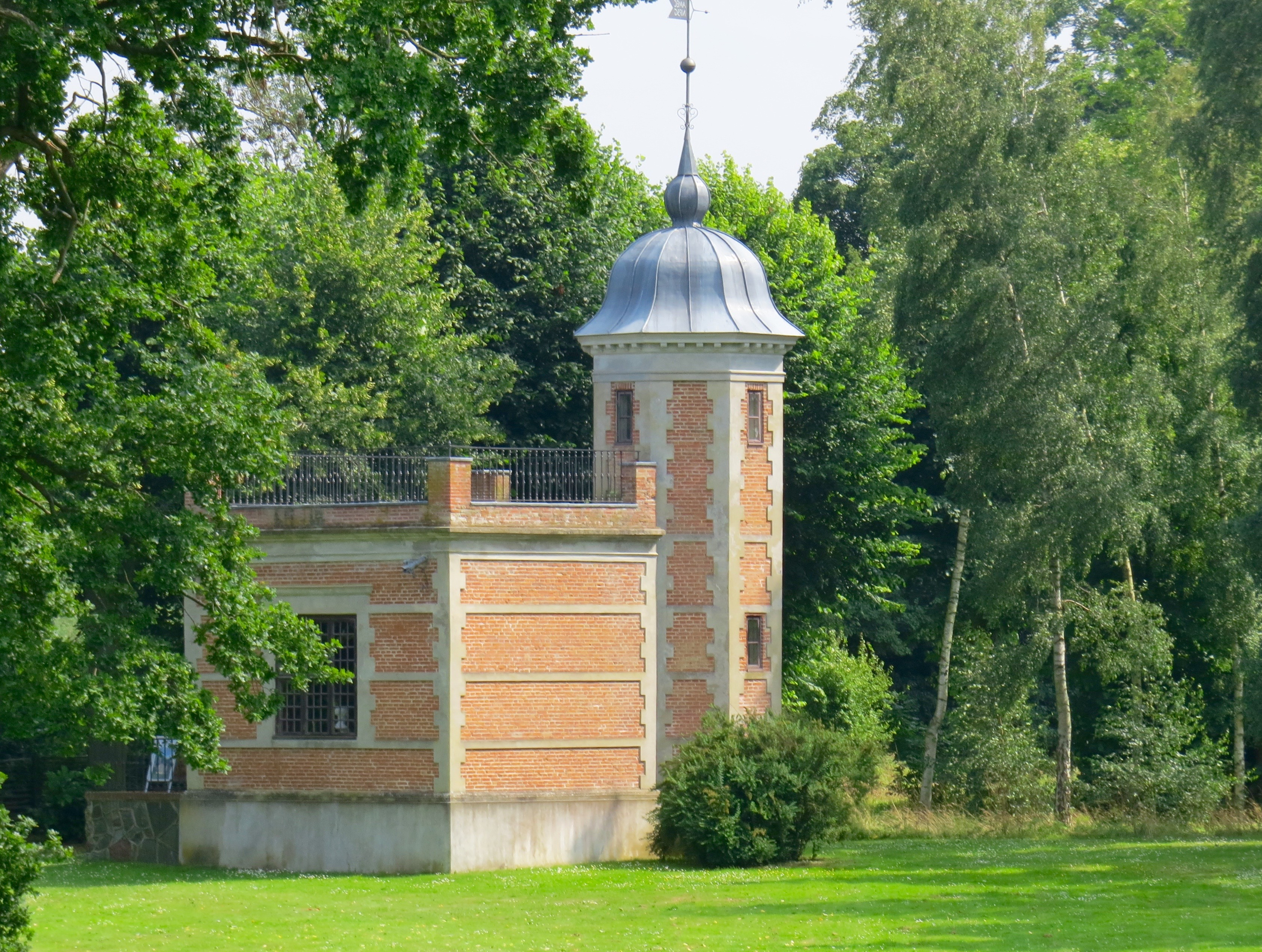
Grundtvig's Pavilion

The estate's grounds are most notable for the Grundtvig Pavilion, originally built for N.F.S. Grundtvig shortly after he married Marie Toft, the widow of Rønnebæksholm. Grundtvig gave it the name Venligheden (English: The Kindness). It was designed by Johan Daniel Herholdt, shortly before he went abroad on a longer journey. Its design shows influence from English Renaissance garden houses, a rare inspiration in Danish architecture of the time.

== See also ==
- Collett family
- List of historic houses in Denmark
- Listed buildings in Næstved Municipality
