= Køge =

- Town
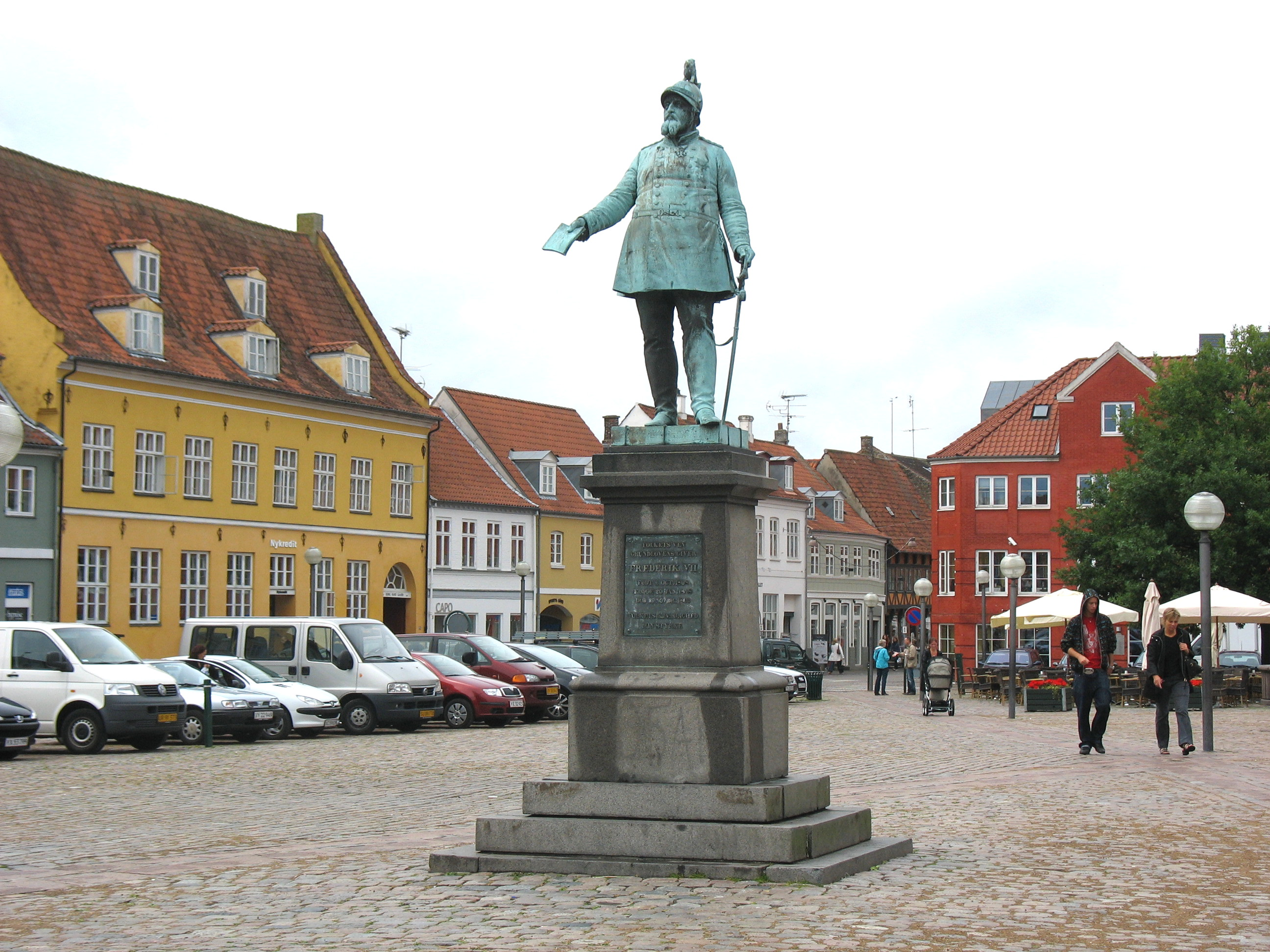
- Køge Torv with its statue of Frederick VII

- Coat of arms

- Location in Denmark Køge (Denmark Region Zealand)
- Coordinates: 55°27′22″N 12°10′47″E
- Country: Denmark
- Region: Zealand (Sjælland)
- Municipality: Køge
- City charter: 13th century
- Current municipality: 2007-01-01

Government
  - Mayor: Ken Kristensen

Area
  - Urban: 18.6 km^{2} (7.2 sq mi)
- Elevation: 3 m (9.8 ft)

Population (1 January 2026)
  - Urban: 38,840
  - Urban density: 2,090/km^{2} (5,410/sq mi)
  - Gender: 18,949 males and 19,891 females
- Demonym: Køgenser
- Time zone: UTC+1 (CET)
  - Summer (DST): UTC+1 (CEST)
- Postal code: 4600
- Area code: (+45) 56
- Website: koege.dk

Køge (Danish pronunciation: [ˈkʰøː(j)ə], older spelling Kjøge) is a Danish seaport on the coast of Køge Bugt (Bay of Køge) 39 km southwest of Copenhagen. It is the principal town and seat of Køge Municipality, Region Zealand, Denmark. In 2026, the urban area had a population of 38,840.

The natural harbour and strategic location have given Køge a long history as a market town. Today, that past is evident in a well-preserved old town centre with many half-timbered houses.

Køge is located in the Copenhagen metropolitan area and is connected to downtown Copenhagen by the E line of the S-train commuter rail system. Køge is also on the Copenhagen-Ringsted Line that was opened in June 2019. The new line positioned Køge as a central hub in Denmark's transport system.

== History ==
Like most Danish cities, the origins of Køge precede written history. Køge was first recognized as an official market town in 1288, as a Southern contrast to Roskilde, the ecclesiastical center at that time, and was an important merchant town during the late Middle Ages.

During the local witchhunt, called Køge Huskors (1608–1615), at least 15 people were convicted of witchcraft and burned at the stake. During the wars between Denmark and Sweden in the period of 1643–1720, the town suffered severely at the Battle of Køge Bay. In 1807, the town and surrounding area was the scene of the Battle of Køge between British and Danish troops. Køge remained a small town until the late 19th century, when industrial development and population growth began. Today, Køge forms the core of the 18th most populous urban area in Denmark.

== Geography ==
Køge is located at the back of Bay of Køge, demarcated by Copenhagen to the north and the Stevns Peninsula to the south, where Køge Å (Køge Creek) meets the sea.

Apart from Køge proper, the town's urban area consists of the suburbs of Køge Nord (Ølby Lyng and Ølsemagle Lyng) to the north and Hastrup and Herfølge to the south.

== Economy ==
The port is directly connected with the Scandinavian Transport Centre, a large business park on the northwestern outskirts of Køge, which hosts – among others – the headquarters and the Danish distribution centre of Netto, a multinational discount supermarket chain founded in Denmark.

== Culture ==
=== Museums ===
Køge Museum is located at 4 Nørregade in a preserved former merchant's house from the year 1619. Further down the street, at No. 29, lies KØS Museum of Art in Public Spaces. It is the only art museum in Denmark dedicated specifically to sketches and models for art works in the public realm. Among its holdings is the original model for The Little Mermaid in Copenhagen.

=== Architecture ===
The historical architecture of the town centre is one of the major attractions of Køge. The oldest dated half-timbered house in Denmark, which is also the oldest dated building of the nordic countries built neither for nobility nor for religious purposes, can be found in Køge. It was built in 1527. Originally a section of a row of hovels, it is now a part of the public library. Pictures can be found in the gallery.

Sankt Nicolai Church is located nearby. The tower of the church contains a lighthouse, which was the first one to be built in Denmark.

Køge Town Hall dates from 1552 and is the oldest town hall in Denmark still in use as such.

Køge Torv, the market square, is, with an area of almost 1 hectare (2.5 acres), the largest town square in Denmark outside Copenhagen and the largest and best-preserved medieval town square in Denmark. There are fair days on the square Wednesday and Saturday.

The Third largest Viking Ring Fortress was found near the village of Lellinge west of Køge.

Kjøge Miniby (Kjøge Mini-Town) is a historically correct model of the town from the year 1865 – built to a scale of 1:10.

=== Sports ===
The football club HB Køge was created through a merger of professional football between Herfølge Boldklub and Køge Boldklub in 2009. It currently plays in the Danish 1st Division. Their home ground is Køge Sports Park (Capelli Sport Stadium).

== Gallery ==
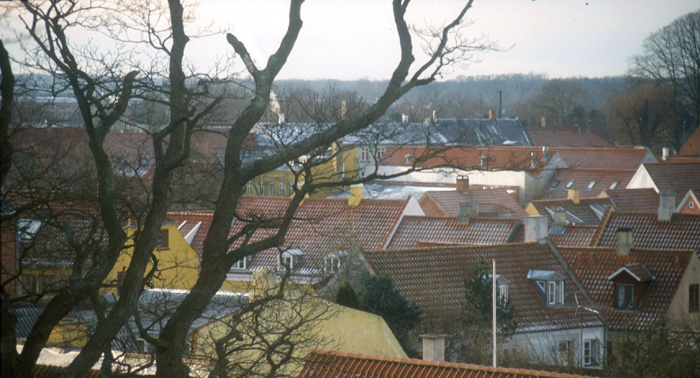
Køge in the winter

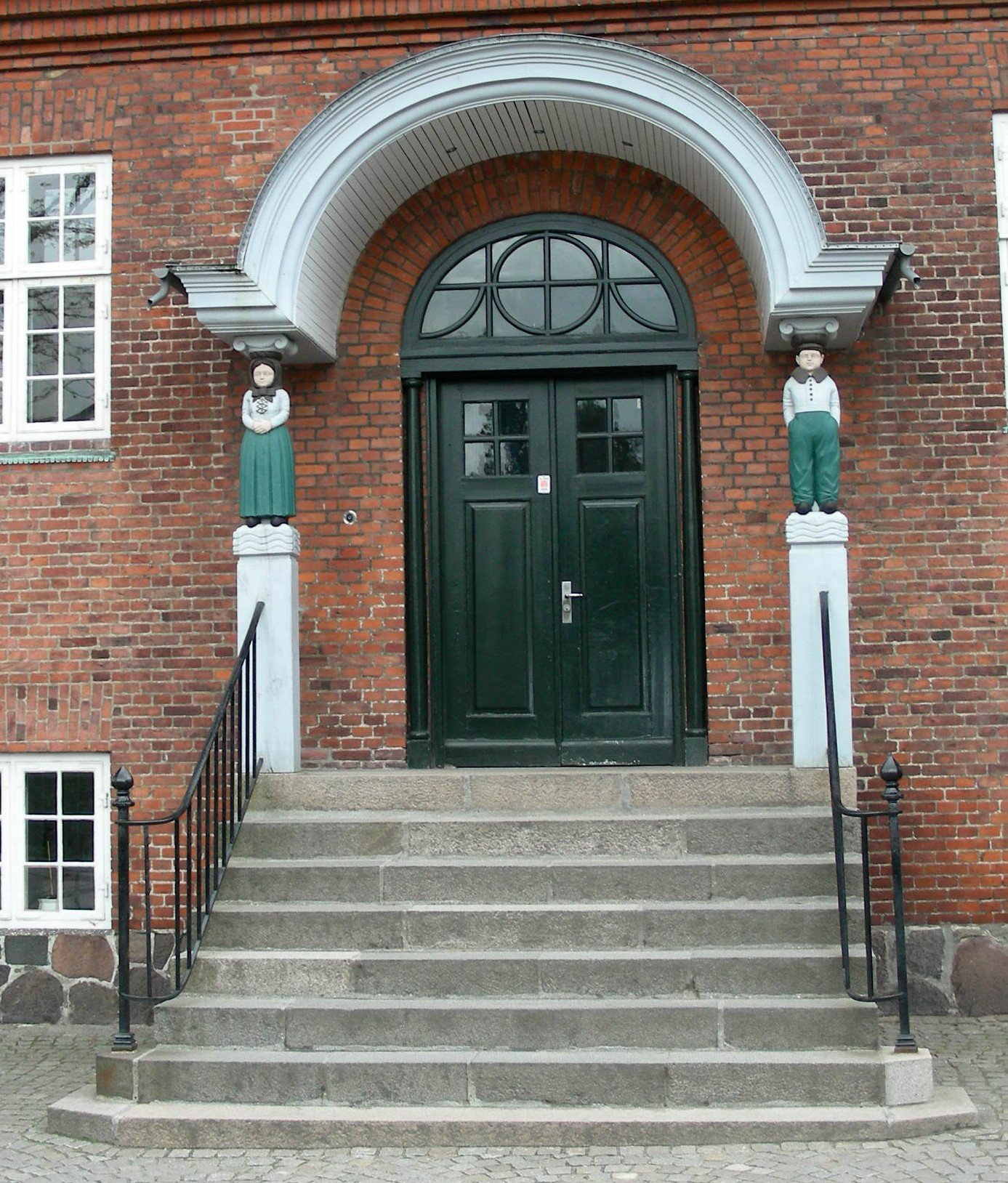
New entrance to the former Tøxens Skole in Køge (now Sankt Nicolai Skole Nord)

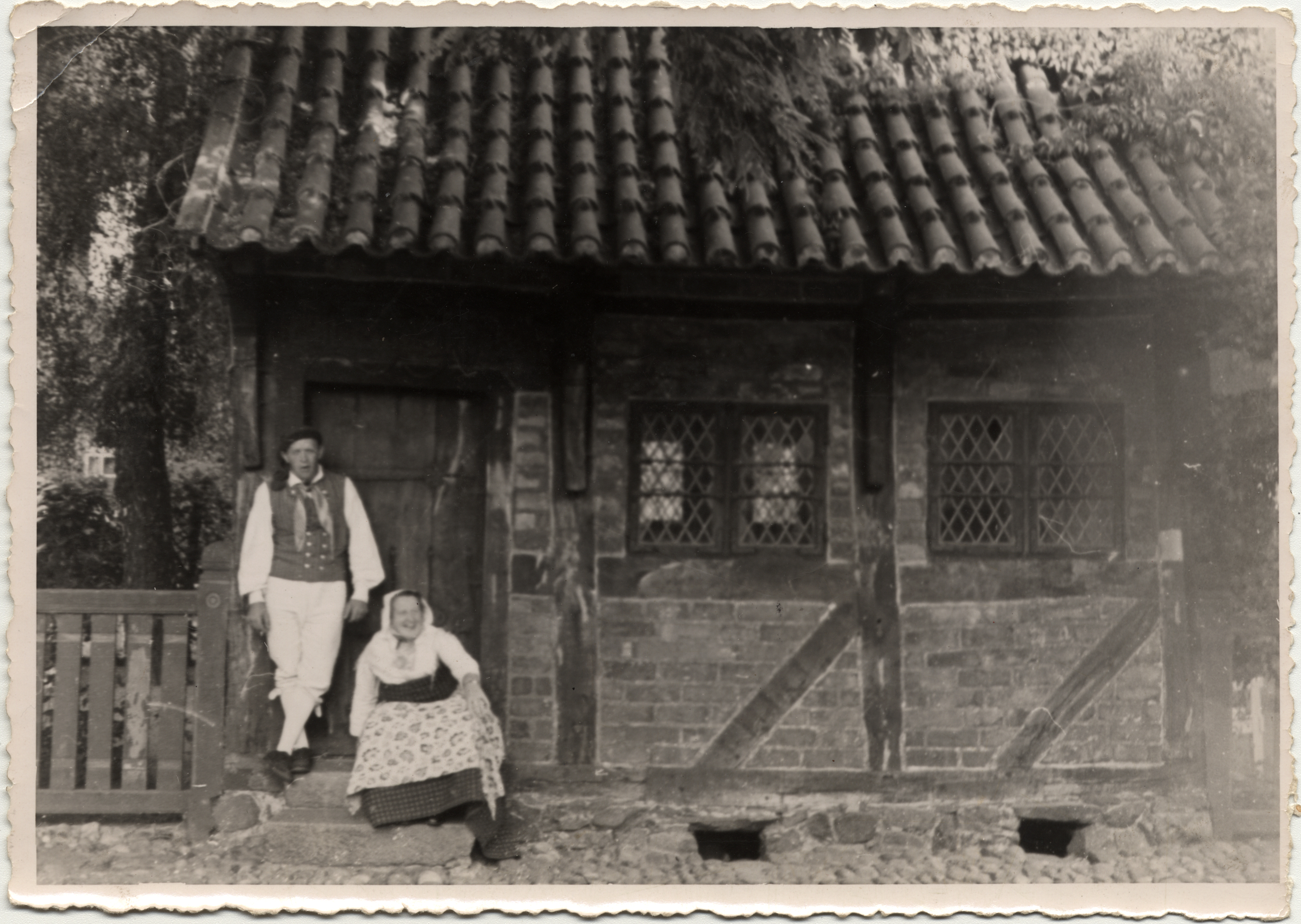
Oldest dated house in Køge, also the oldest dated half-timbered house in Denmark

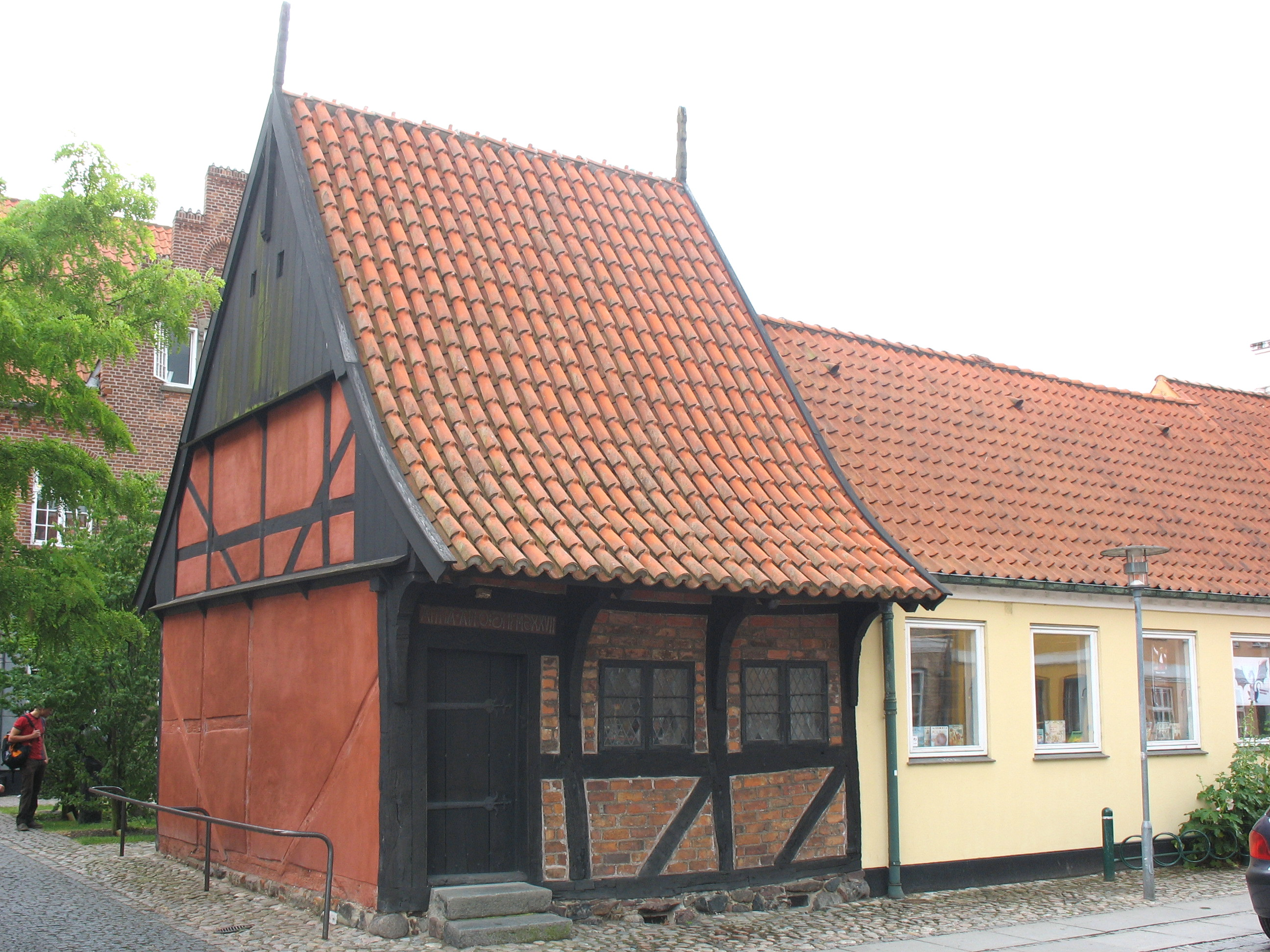
Modern photo of the oldest dated half-timbered house in Køge and Denmark

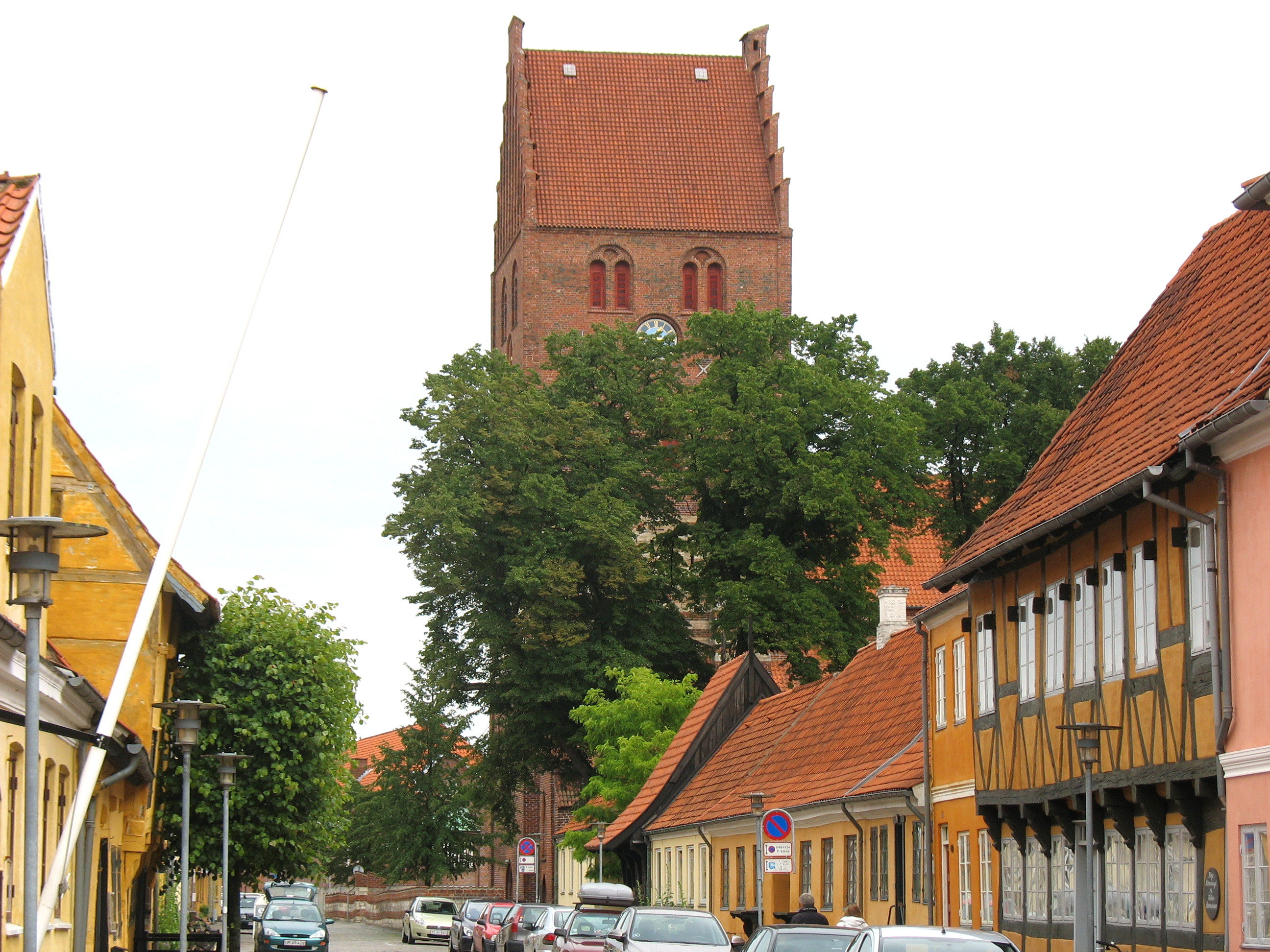
Looking down Kirkestræde (Church Street) in Køge. Køge's church (Sankt Nicolai Kirke is behind the trees)

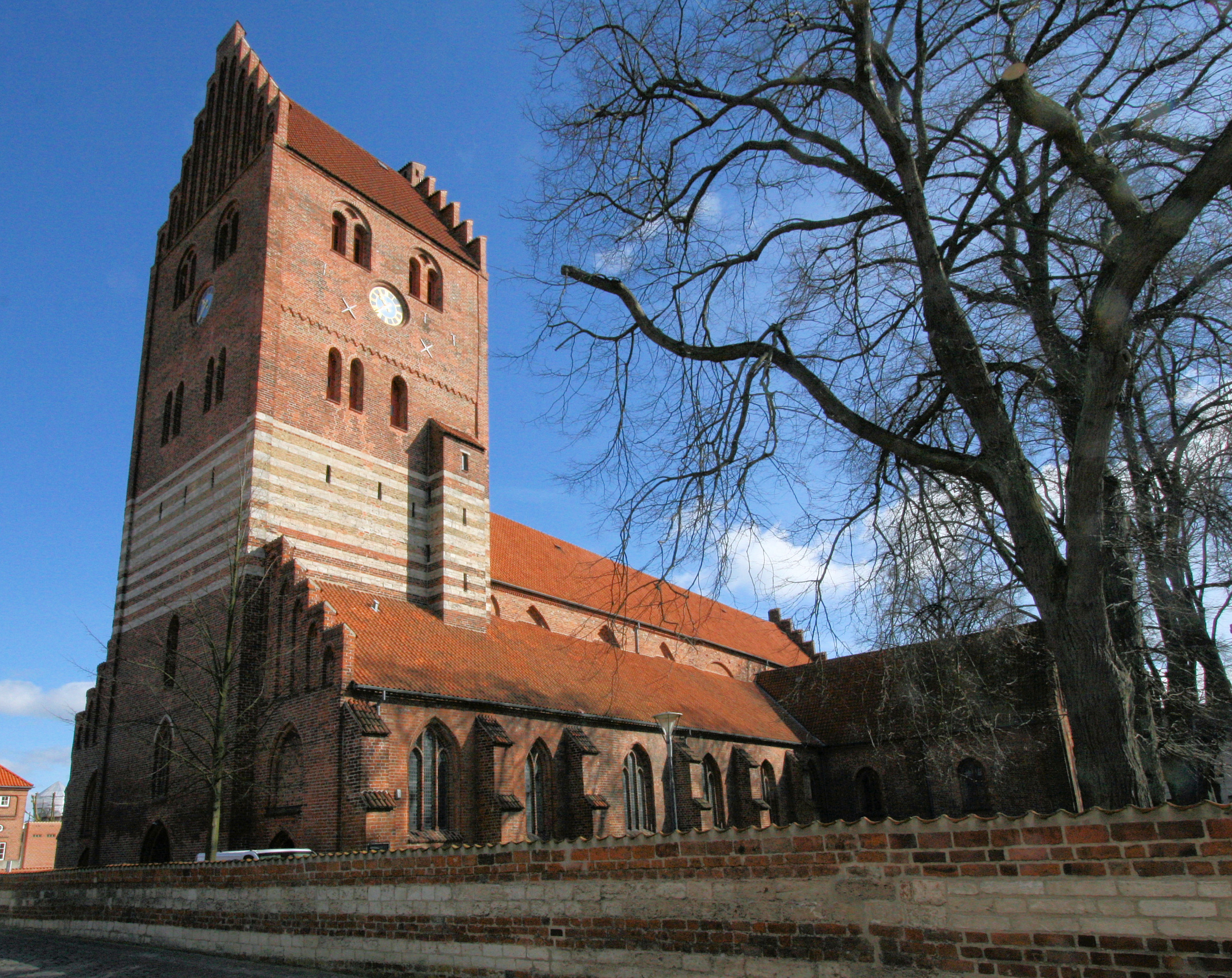
Køge church (Sankt Nicolai Kirke)

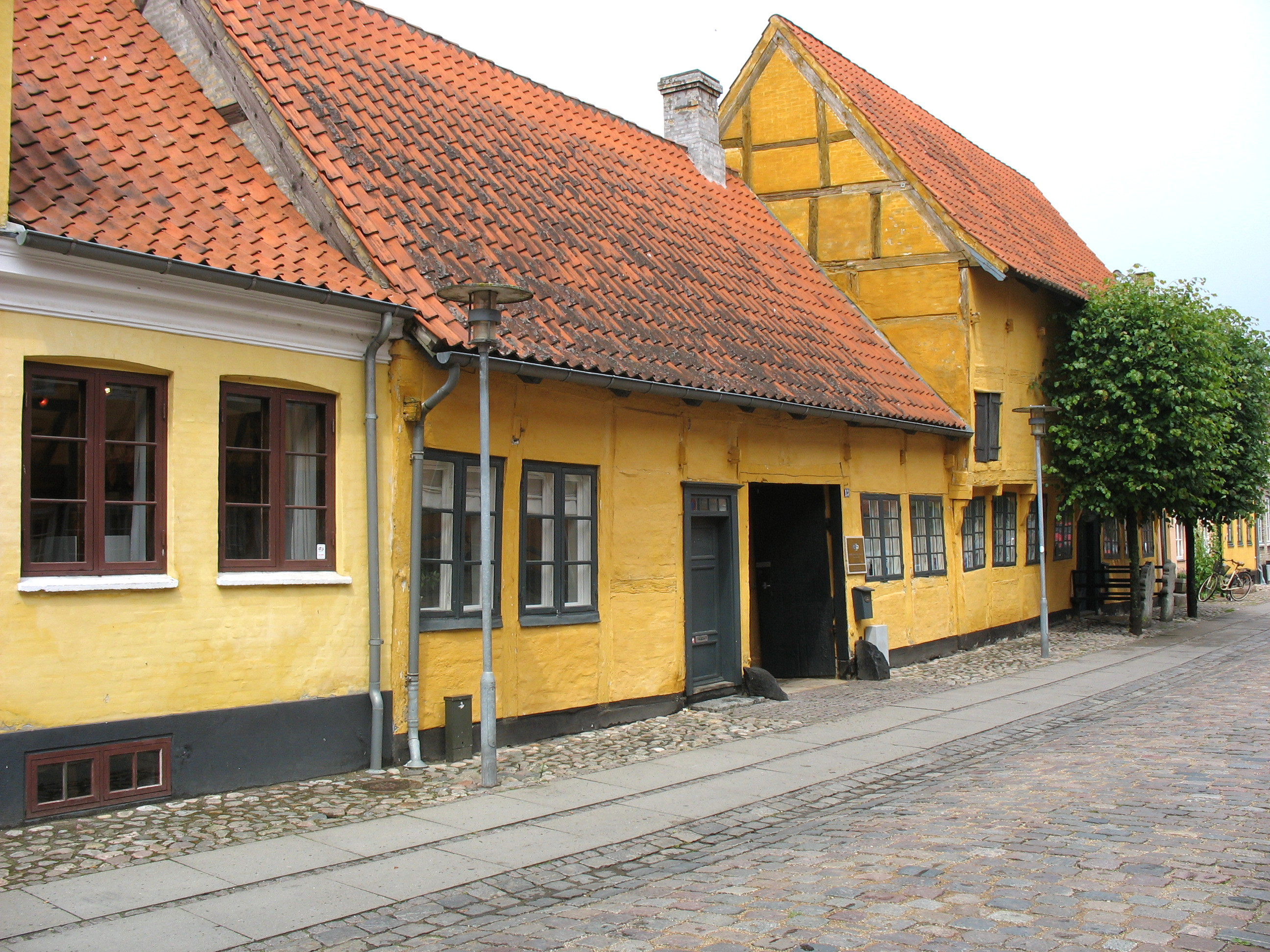
Old houses on Kirkestræde (Church Street) in Køge

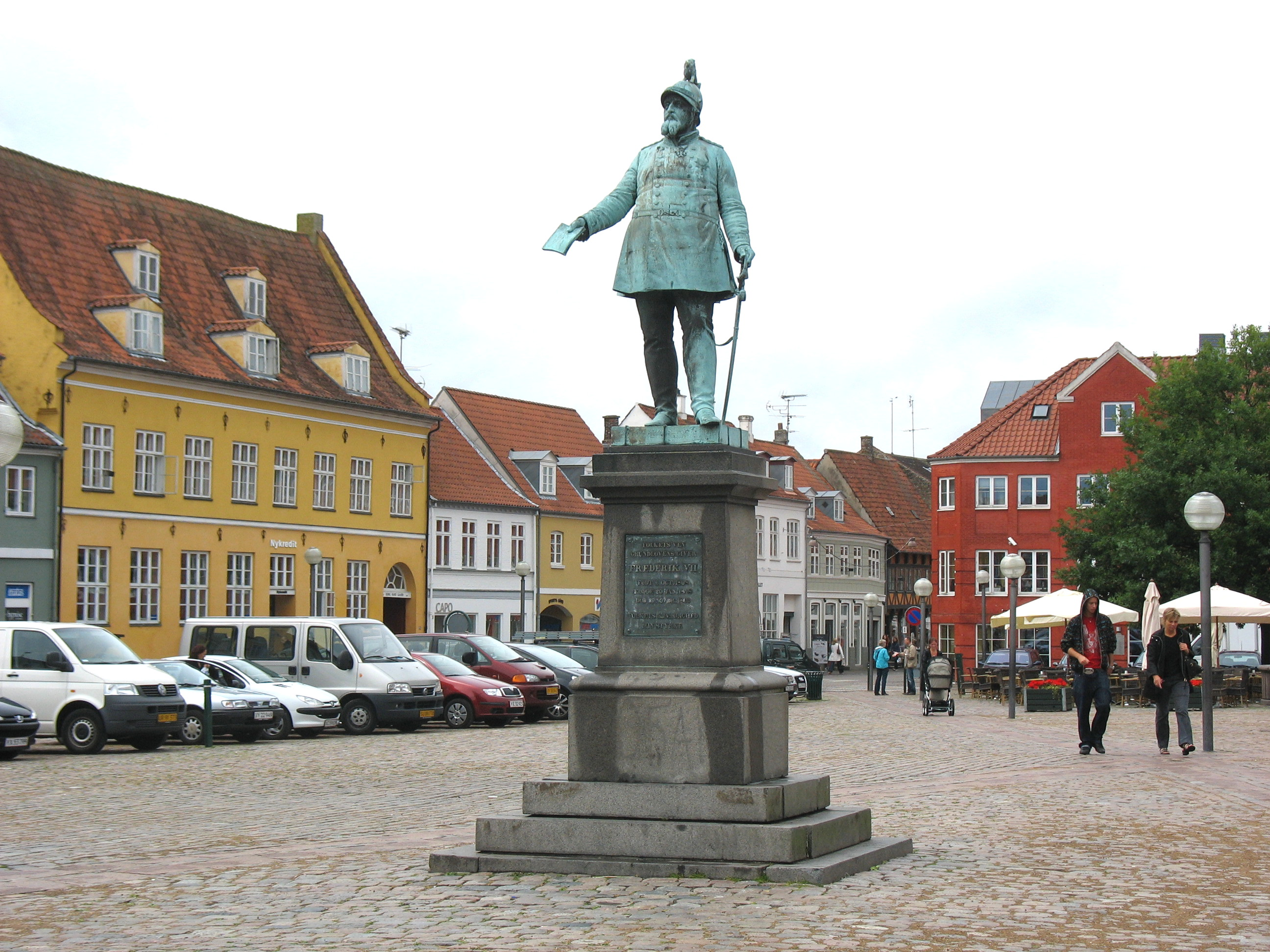
Statue of King Frederik VII in the centre of Køge's town square

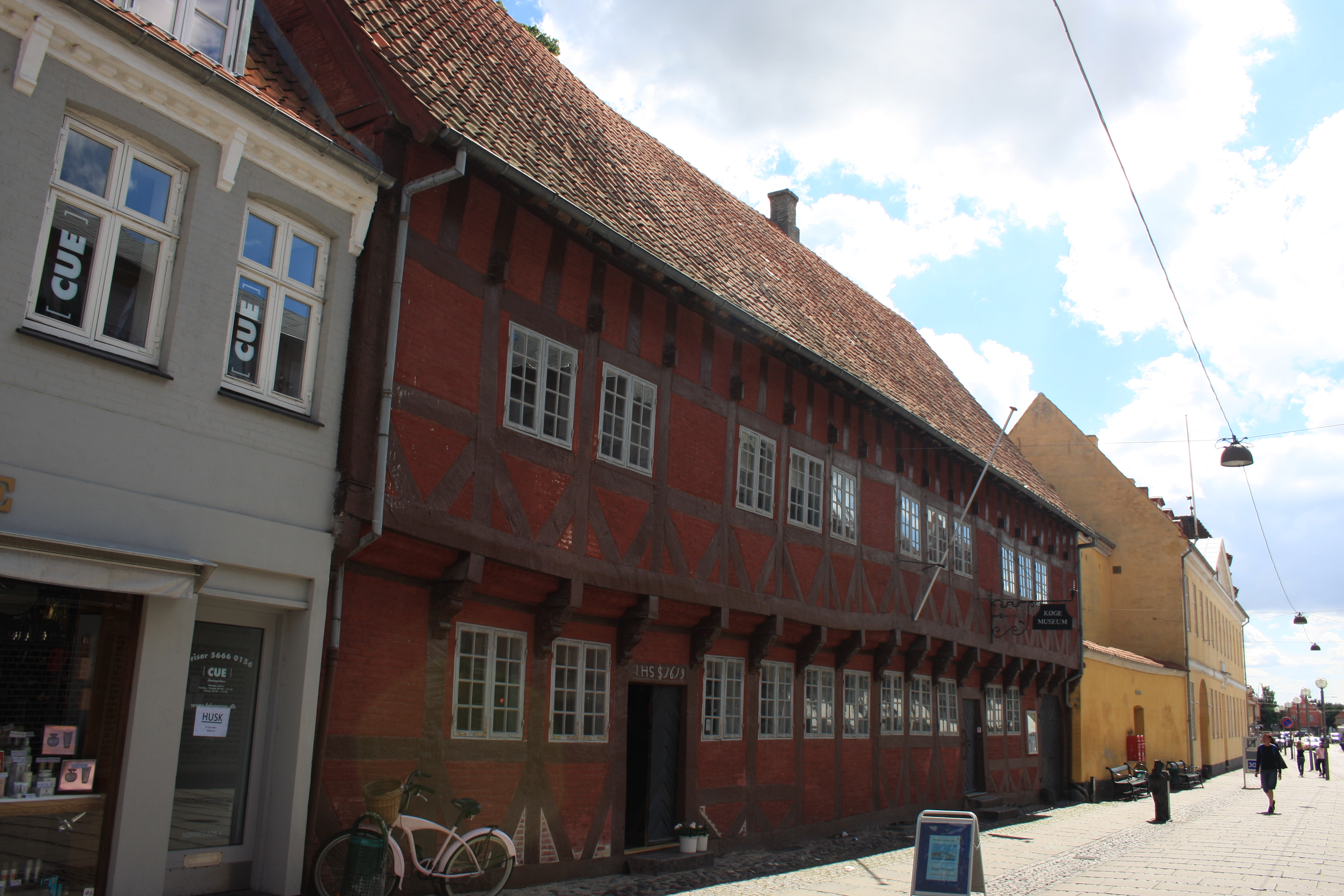
Køge Museum with the yellow painted town hall in the background

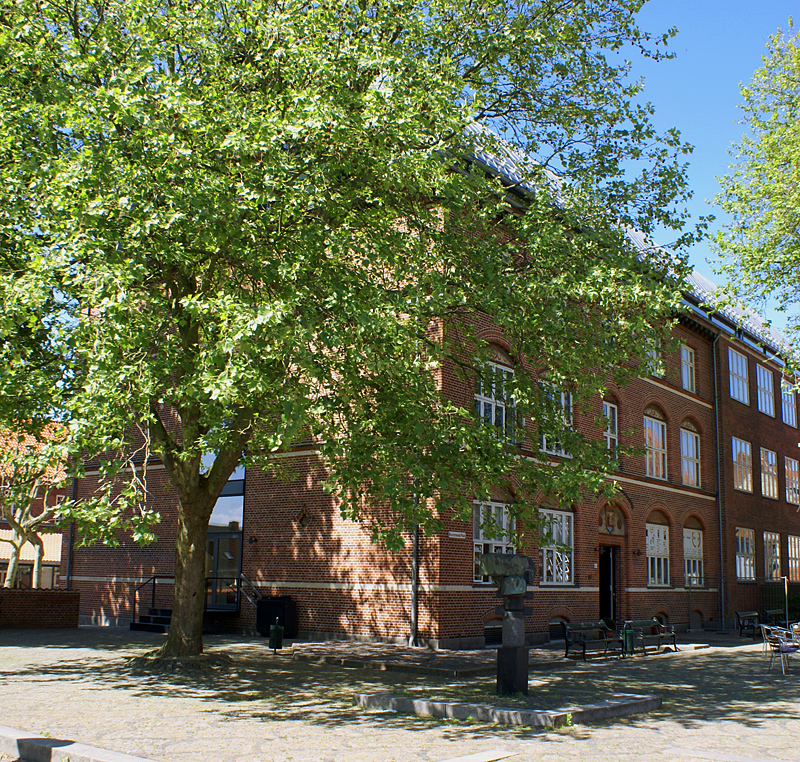
KØS - museum of art in public spaces

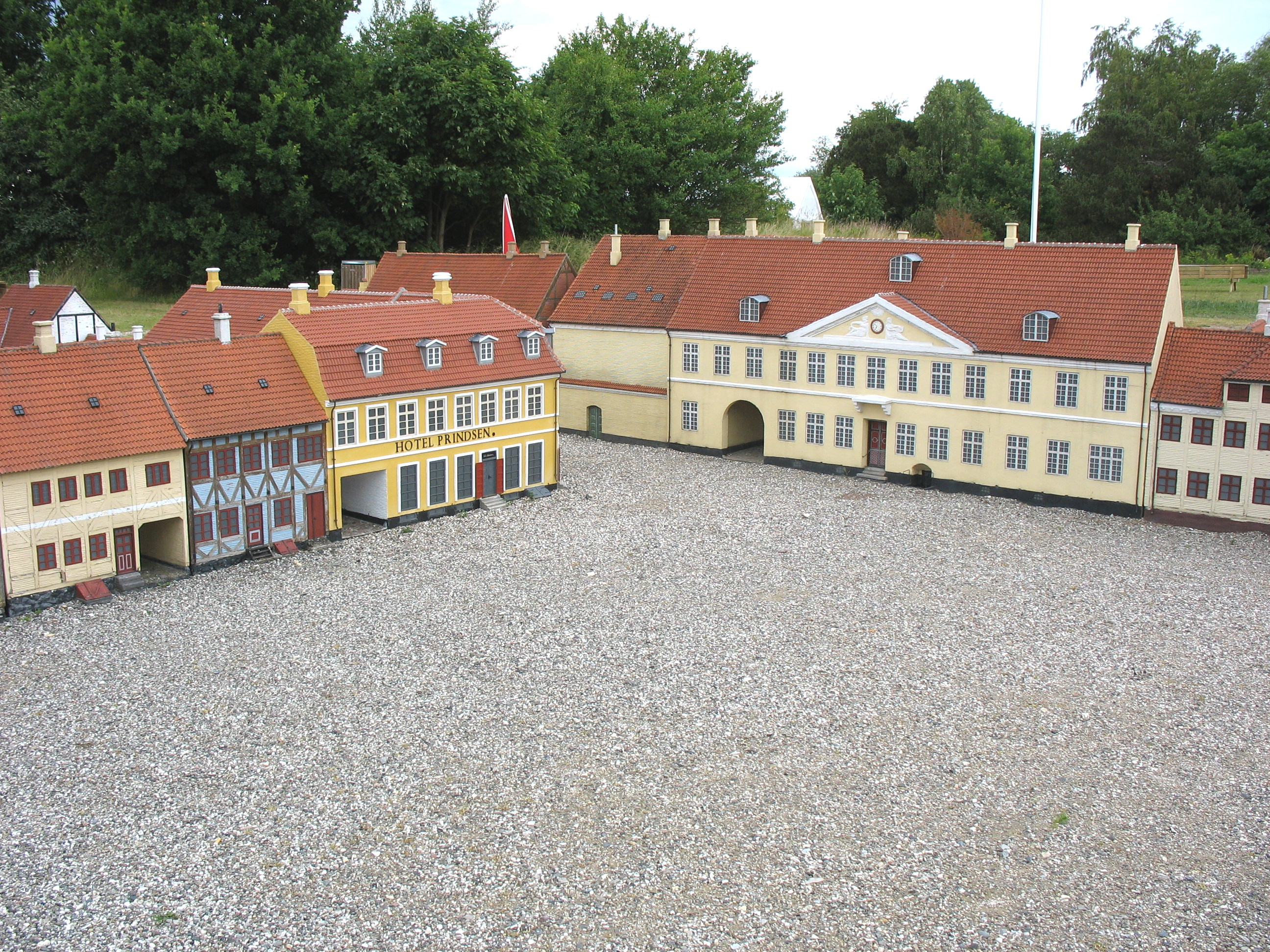
Part of Kjøge Miniby (Kjøge Mini-Town)

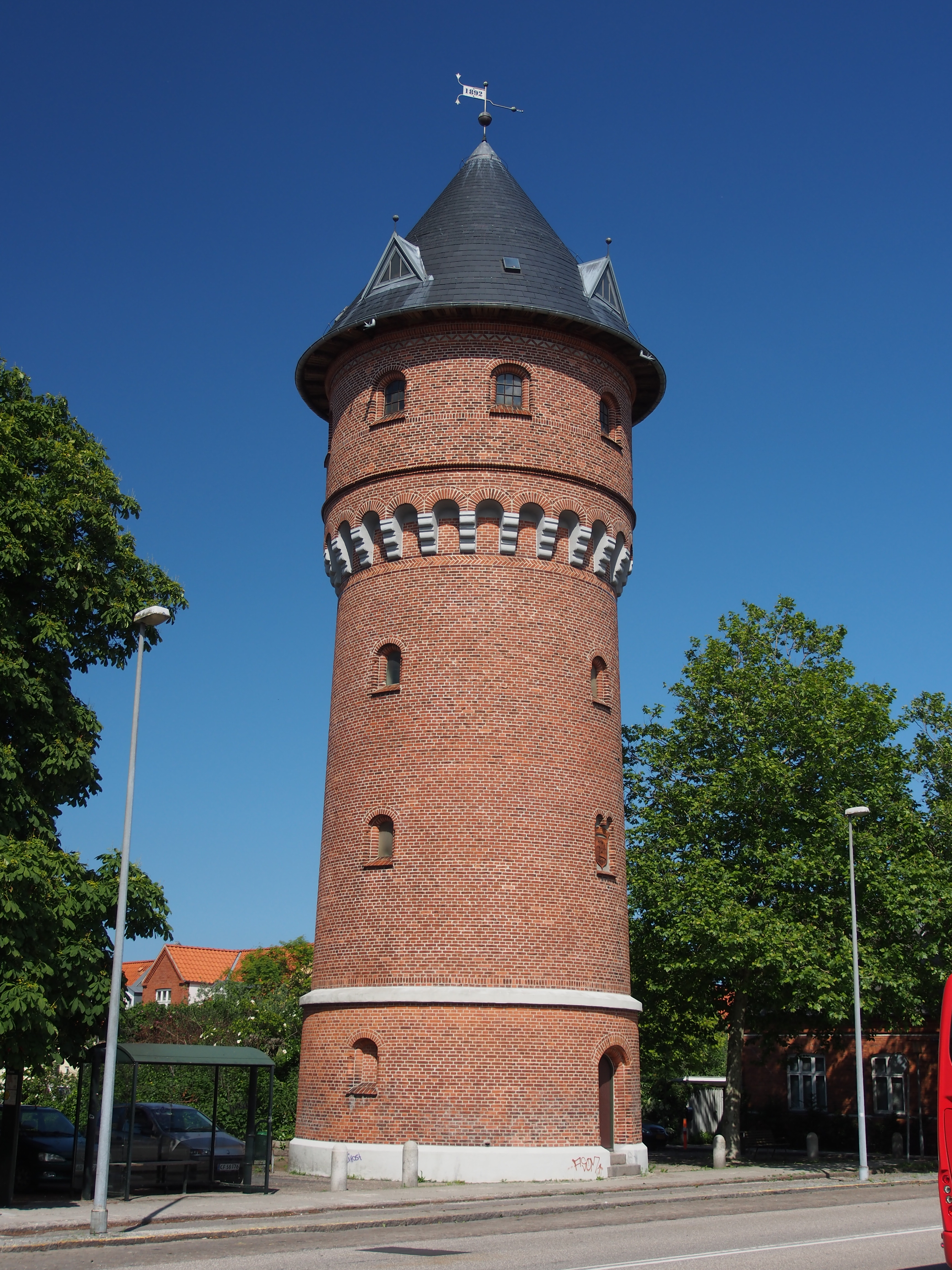
Water tower in Køge

== Transport ==
=== Roads ===
The partial Y interchange, where the Danish part of the motorway E20 meet the Danish part of the motorway E47 and E55, is located only few kilometers northwest of Køge.

=== Railway stations ===
Køge railway station is the principal railway station of the town. The Copenhagen S-train network has a line which begins at the station, which also offers regional trains to Roskilde and Næstved and local trains to the Stevns Peninsula. There are also an S-train station in the northern part of Ølby Lyng and a local train station in the southern suburb of Herfølge.

The Køge North railway station opened on 1 June 2019 and serves as an Intercity, regional and S-train station.

=== Port of Køge ===
The Port of Køge is one of the oldest ports in Denmark. It was modernised between 2005 and 2021. Since 2002, there has been a ferry connection to Rønne on the Baltic island of Bornholm, now operated by Bornholmslinjen.

== Notable people ==
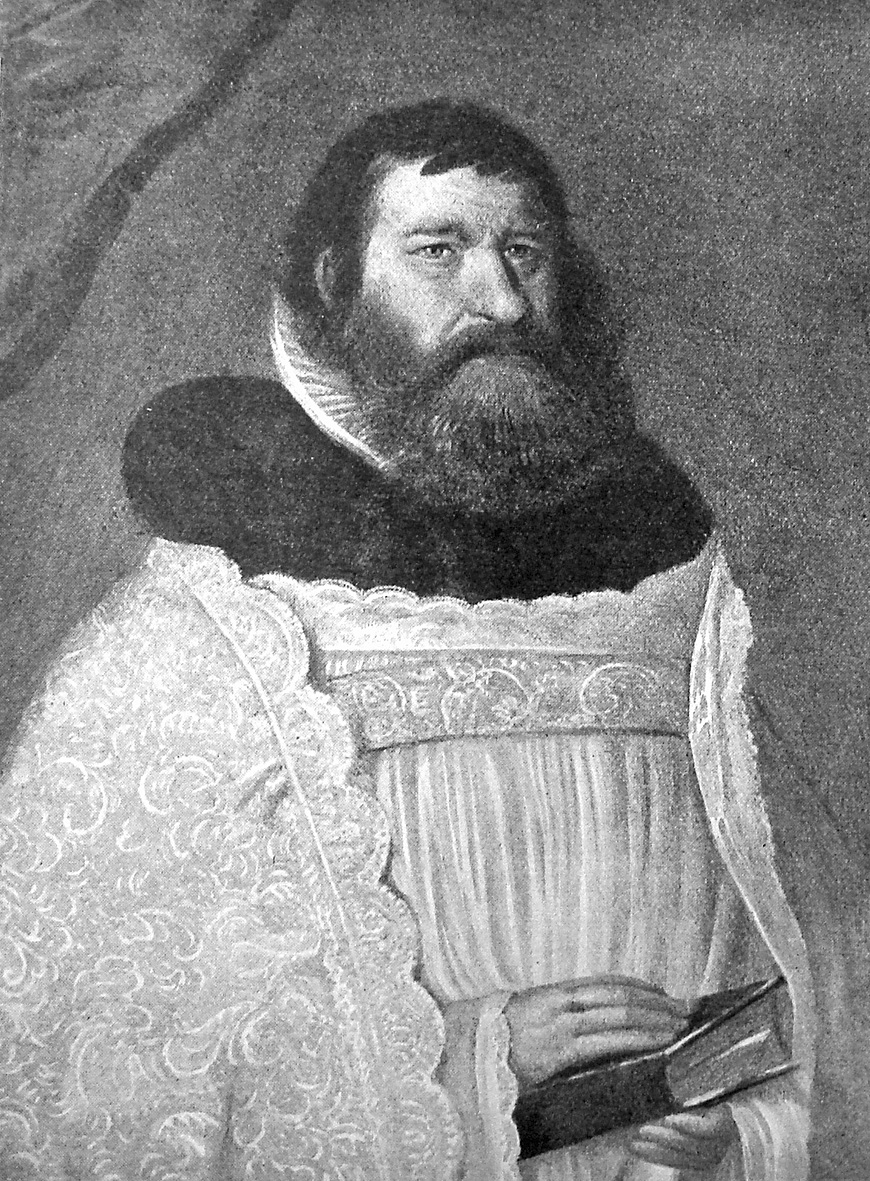
Jesper Brochmand

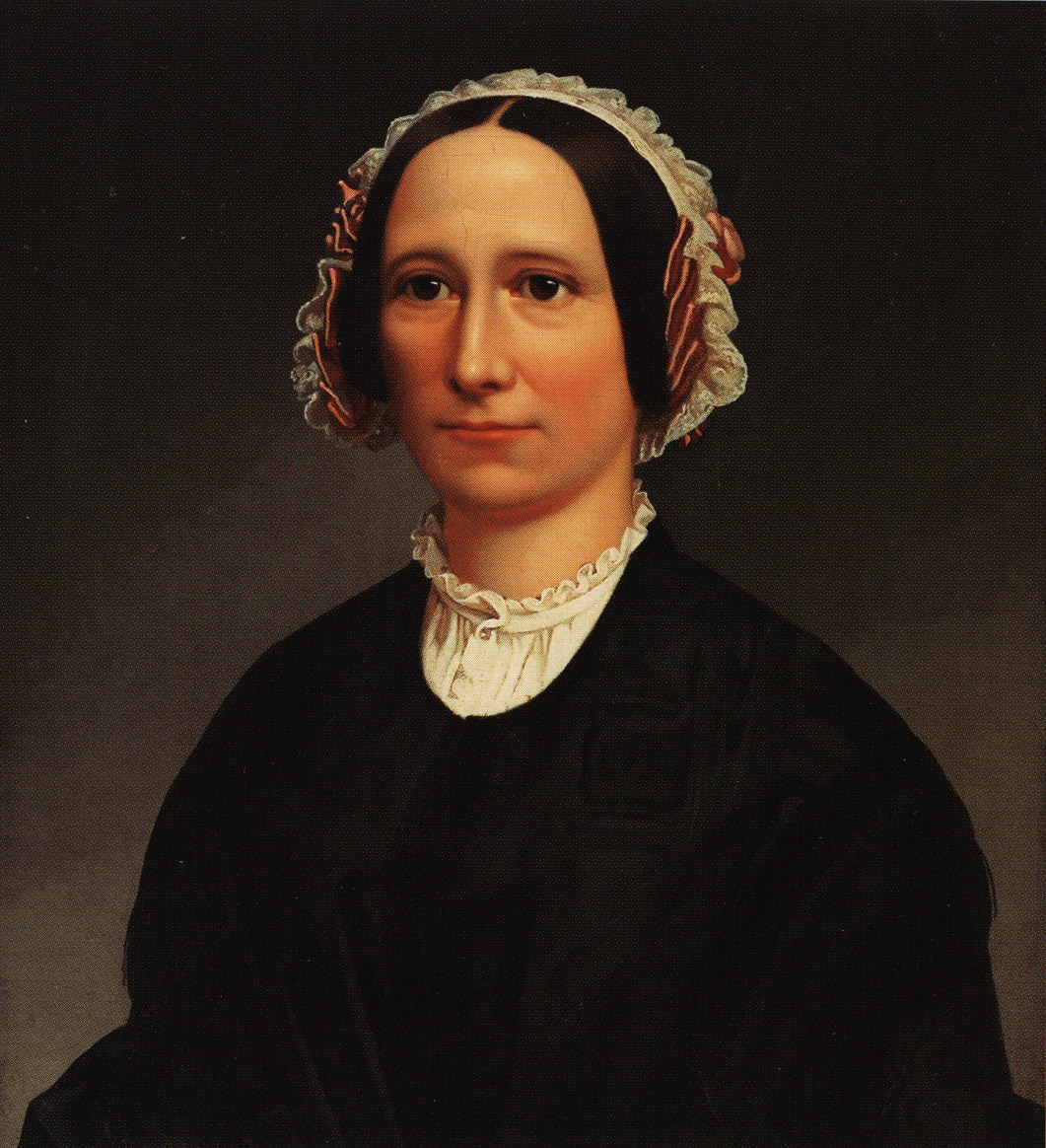
Marie Toft, 1845

- Jesper Brochmand (1585 in Køge - 1652) a Danish Lutheran clergyman, theologian and Bishop of the Diocese of Zealand
- Hans Holst (before 1619 - after 1640) a Danish woodcarver did work in St Nicholas Church
- Marie Toft (1813 in the Gammel Køgegård manor – 1854) a wealthy Danish landowner who managed Rønnebæksholm and wife of philosopher N. F. S. Grundtvig
- Carl Christian Amussen (1825–1902) emigrated to New Zealand 1857, then to Utah in 1868, where he was their first jeweler
- Emmy Drachmann (1854–1928) a Danish writer and the wife of Holger Drachmann
- Harald Bergstedt (1877-1965) a Danish writer, novelist, playwright and poet
- Finn Kjærsdam (born 1943) a Danish Land Surveyor, brought up in Køge
- Michael Falch (born 1956) a Danish singer, guitarist, author and actor
- Ulla Miilmann (born 1972) is the principal flautist of the DNSO, brought up in Vemmedrup
- Michael Qureshi (born 1976) discredited Danish journalist, used fake sources

=== Sport ===
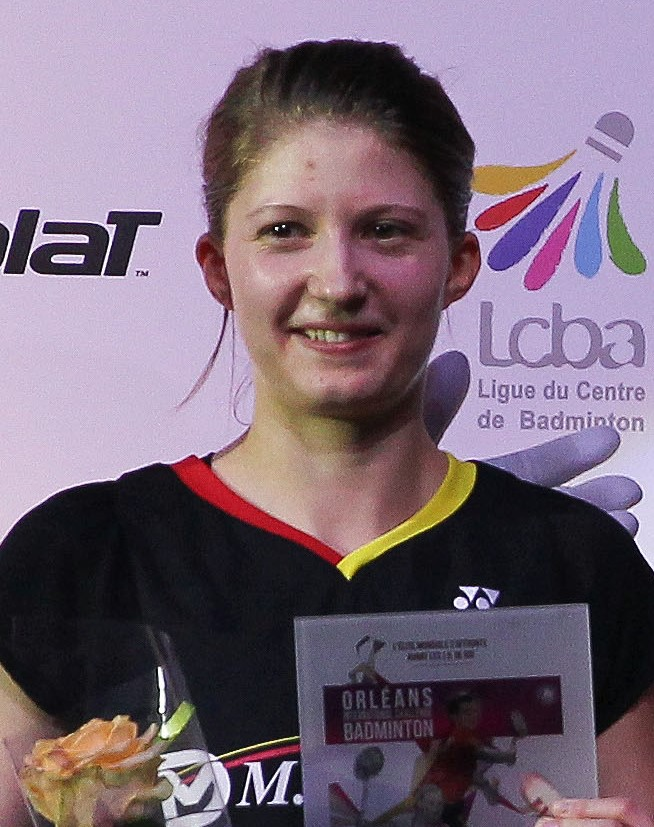
Lena Grebak, 2016

- Ove Frederiksen (1884–1966) a tennis player, competed at the 1912 Summer Olympics
- Hans Pedersen (1887 in Højelse near Køge – 1943) a Danish gymnast who competed in the 1912 and 1920 Summer Olympics
- Henry Larsen (1916–2002) rower, team bronze medallist 1948 Summer Olympics
- Børge Raahauge Nielsen (1920–2010) rower, team bronze medallist 1948 Summer Olympics
- Casper Ankergren (born 1979) a former football goalkeeper, 319 club caps
- Klaus Nielsen (born 1980) a pro. mountain biker, competed at the 2008 Summer Olympics
- Søren Larsen (born 1981) retired footballer, 229 club caps and 20 for Denmark
- Nicklas Pedersen (born 1987) a Danish former footballer with 250 club caps and 13 for Denmark, now U17 manager at HB Køge
- Lena Grebak (born 1991) a Danish female badminton player
- Emil Holst (born 1991) a Danish badminton player
- Sebastian Lander (born 1991) a road bicycle racer, won the Danish national road race championship in 2012

== See also ==
- Køge Stadion
- Gammel Køgegård
- Nearby towns: Greve Strand, Roskilde, Ringsted and Haslev.
- Chronicle of the Expulsion of the Grayfriars#Chapter 10 Concerning the Friary in Køge
