= 2025 Billund municipal election =

Municipal election in Denmark

← 2021	18 November 2025	2029 →

All 25 seats to the Billund municipal council 13 seats needed for a majority
- Turnout: 14,301 (67.9%) ▼0.5%
	First party	Second party	Third party
	V	A	Æ
Party	Venstre	Social Democrats	Denmark Democrats
Last election	10 seats, 37.8%	9 seats, 32.0%	Did not stand
Seats won	10	6	4
Seat change	0	▼3	▲4
Popular vote	5,215	3,346	2,002
Percentage	37.1%	23.8%	14.2%
Swing	▼0.7%	▼8.2%	New
	Fourth party	Fifth party	Sixth party
	F	C	O
Party	Green Left	Conservatives	Danish People's Party
Last election	0 seats, 0.9%	3 seats, 9.7%	2 seats, 8.9%
Seats won	2	2	1
Seat change	▲2	▼1	▼1
Popular vote	1,318	831	732
Percentage	9.4%	5.9%	5.2%
Swing	▲8.5%	▼3.8%	▼3.7%
Mayor before election
Stephanie Storbank
Venstre
Mayor after election
Stephanie Storbank
Venstre

The 2025 Billund Municipal election was held on November 18, 2025, to elect the 25 members to sit in the regional council for the Billund Municipal council, in the period of 2026 to 2029. Stephanie Storbank from Venstre, would secure re-election.

== Background ==
Following the 2021 election, Stephanie Storbank from Venstre became mayor for her first term. She ran for a second term.

== Electoral system ==
For elections to Danish municipalities, a number varying from 9 to 31 are chosen to be elected to the municipal council. The seats are then allocated using the D'Hondt method and a closed list proportional representation. Billund Municipality had 25 seats in 2025.

== Electoral alliances ==
=== Electoral Alliance 1 ===
Party		Political alignment
C	Conservatives	Centre-right
O	Danish People's Party	Right-wing to Far-right
Æ	Denmark Democrats	Right-wing to Far-right

=== Electoral Alliance 2 ===
Party		Political alignment
M	Moderates	Centre to Centre-right
V	Venstre	Centre-right

== Results by polling station ==
Division	A	C	F	M	N	O	V	Æ	Å
Division	%	%	%	%	%	%	%	%	%
Billund (Hans Jensensvej 6)	27.4	4.2	6.9	2.2	4.1	4.4	42.0	7.7	1.0
Sdr. Omme	21.5	12.3	5.3	1.0	0.3	4.8	18.4	35.7	0.7
Vorbasse	28.0	2.0	4.2	1.3	0.8	6.2	35.9	21.2	0.4
Filskov	15.3	3.3	3.0	2.4	0.7	6.3	53.0	15.7	0.3
St./Krogager	15.0	1.8	6.8	0.0	0.6	6.2	58.7	10.4	0.6
Grindsted	23.2	7.6	14.9	2.9	0.4	5.5	32.7	12.2	0.5
Hejnsvig	20.4	3.6	4.8	1.4	0.8	4.9	45.9	17.8	0.4

== Results ==
Party		Votes	%	+/-	Seats	+/-
Billund Municipality
V	Venstre	5,215	37.10	-0.68	10	0
A	Social Democrats	3,346	23.80	-8.15	6	-3
Æ	Denmark Democrats	2,002	14.24	New	4	New
F	Green Left	1,318	9.38	+8.49	2	+2
C	Conservatives	831	5.91	-3.78	2	-1
O	Danish People's Party	732	5.21	-3.69	1	-1
M	Moderates	309	2.20	New	0	New
N	Billund International	215	1.53	New	0	New
Å	The Alternative	90	0.64	New	0	New
Total		14,058	100	N/A	25	N/A
Invalid votes		51	0.24	-0.17		
Blank votes		192	0.91	+0.19		
Turnout		14,301	67.85	-0.48		
Source: valg.dk

== Opinion polls ==
Polling firm	Fieldwork date	Sample size	V	A	C	O	F	M	N	Å	Æ	Others	Lead
Epinion	4 Sep - 13 Oct 2025	444	39.3	23.5	5.0	7.5	7.0	1.7	–	0.0	15.6	0.4	15.8
2024 european parliament election	9 Jun 2024		25.6	14.7	8.3	8.8	8.1	6.4	–	1.5	13.8	–	10.9
2022 general election	1 Nov 2022		23.3	25.7	3.8	2.7	3.2	8.6	–	0.9	14.9	–	2.4
2021 regional election	16 Nov 2021		46.4	28.7	8.2	5.2	1.8	–	–	0.2	–	–	17.7
2021 municipal election	16 Nov 2021		37.8 (10)	32.0 (9)	9.7 (3)	8.9 (2)	0.9 (0)	–	–	–	–	–	5.8
