= 2021 Billund municipal election =

Municipal elections in Denmark

← 2017	16 November 2021	2025 →

All 25 seats to the Billund Municipal Council 13 seats needed for a majority
- Turnout: 14,182 (68.3%) ▼4.5pp
	First party	Second party	Third party
	V	A	C
Party	Venstre	Social Democrats	Conservatives
Last election	10 seats, 36.5%	7 seats, 27.9%	1 seat, 6.1%
Seats won	10	9	3
Seat change	0	▲2	▲2
Popular vote	5,267	4,455	1,351
Percentage	37.8%	32%	9.7%
Swing	▲1.3%	▲4.1%	▲3.6%
	Fourth party	Fifth party	Sixth party
	O	L	B
Party	Danish People's Party	Lokalpolitisk Forum	Social Liberals
Last election	3 seats, 11.4%	Did Not Stand	2 seats, 7.7%
Seats won	2	1	0
Seat change	▼1	▲1	▼2
Popular vote	1,240	588	222
Percentage	8.9%	2.6%	1.6%
Swing	▼2.5%	New	▼6.1%
Mayor before election
Ib Kristensen
Venstre
Mayor after election
Stephanie Storbank
Venstre

Billund Municipality can be categorized as a quite blue (Note: as in voting for parties of the blue bloc) municipality, having voted for parties of the blue bloc by 65%, the fifth most of the 98 municipalities in Denmark, in the 2019 Danish general election.

Ib Kristensen from Venstre had been mayor of Billund Municipality ever since the 2007 municipal reform. However, in September 2020, he announced that he would not stand for re-election, stating that he saw himself as too old. Already in November 2020, 37-year old Stephanie Storbank could announce that she had the support to become the new mayor candidate for Venstre in the election the following year.

In the election result, Venstre would increase their vote share by 1.3% and once again become the biggest party, although they didn't win any new seats. It was later announced that Venstre and the Social Democrats, who together had won 17 of the 25 seats, had reached an agreement that would see Stephanie Storbank become the new mayor.

== Electoral system ==
For elections to Danish municipalities, a number varying from 9 to 31 are chosen to be elected to the municipal council. The seats are then allocated using the D'Hondt method and a closed list proportional representation. Billund Municipality had 25 seats in 2021

Unlike in Danish General Elections, in elections to municipal councils, electoral alliances are allowed.

== Electoral alliances ==
=== Electoral Alliance 1 ===
Party		Political alignment
A	Social Democrats	Centre-left
F	Green Left	Centre-left to Left-wing

=== Electoral Alliance 2 ===
Party		Political alignment
C	Conservatives	Centre-right
D	New Right	Right-wing to Far-right

=== Electoral Alliance 3 ===
Party		Political alignment
L	Lokalpolitisk Forum	Local politics
O	Danish People's Party	Right-wing to Far-right

== Results by polling station ==
L = Lokalpolitisk Forum

Division	A	B	C	D	F	K	L	O	V
Division	%	%	%	%	%	%	%	%	%
Billund	35.2	3.6	5.7	1.7	1.0	0.2	15.8	4.9	31.9
Sdr. Omme	30.0	0.6	25.1	3.4	1.3	0.4	0.4	15.2	23.5
Vorbasse	35.0	1.2	4.8	3.2	1.3	5.0	3.2	9.5	36.7
Filskov	20.8	0.4	3.5	1.8	0.5	0.7	1.4	10.2	60.6
Hejnsvig	25.5	0.5	5.4	2.5	1.0	0.9	2.2	11.3	50.8
Grindsted	33.1	1.0	11.9	2.2	0.7	1.6	2.2	9.7	37.5
St./Krogager	20.9	0.5	3.4	2.7	0.4	0.4	1.1	5.6	65.1

== Results ==
Party		Votes	%	+/-	Seats	+/-
Billund Municipality
V	Venstre	5,267	37.78	+1.29	10	0
A	Social Democrats	4,455	31.95	+4.06	9	+2
C	Conservatives	1,351	9.69	+3.63	3	+2
O	Danish People's Party	1,240	8.89	-2.51	2	-1
L	Lokalpolitisk Forum	784	5.62	New	1	New
D	New Right	322	2.31	New	0	New
B	Social Liberals	222	1.59	-6.08	0	-2
K	Christian Democrats	178	1.28	New	0	New
F	Green Left	123	0.88	-1.53	0	0
Total		13,942	100	N/A	25	N/A
Invalid votes		85	0.41	+0.22		
Blank votes		155	0.75	+0.14		
Turnout		14,182	68.33	-4.48		
Source: valg.dk
