= Billund =

Billund may refer to:

- Billund, Denmark, a town
- Billund Municipality, a kommune in the Region of Southern Denmark
- Billund Airport, the airport near Billund, Denmark
