= Lisbjerg =

- Town
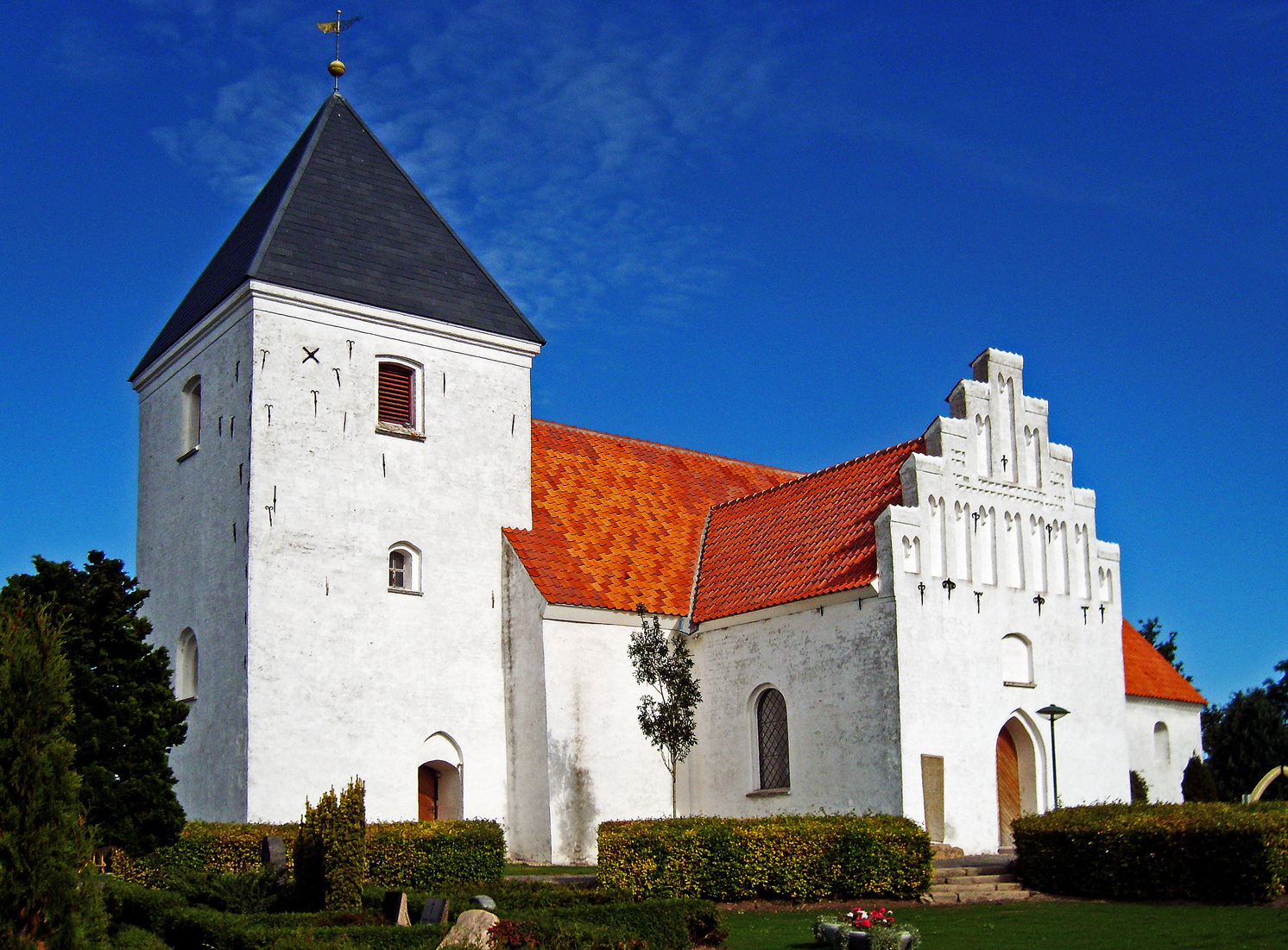
- Lisbjerg church

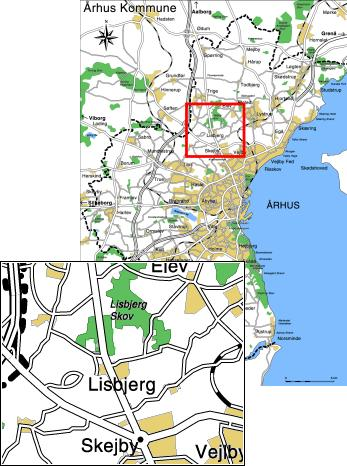
- Location relative to Aarhus
- Coordinates: 56°13′15″N 10°10′00″E
- Country: Denmark
- Region: Midtjylland
- Municipality: Aarhus
- Foundation: Nordic Bronze Age

Area
  - Urban: 0.7 km^{2} (0.27 sq mi)

Population (1. January 2026)
  - Urban: 2,102
  - Urban density: 3,000/km^{2} (7,800/sq mi)
- Time zone: UTC+1 (CET)
  - Summer (DST): UTC+1 (CEST)
- Area code: (+45)

Lisbjerg is a village and suburb 7 km north of the city center of Aarhus, Denmark. Lisbjerg has a population of 2,102 (1 January 2026).

Lisbjerg is situated on the northern slopes of the broad and flat valley of Egådalen, marking the northern limits of Aarhus. The village is cut through by the expressway of Randersvej, connecting the cities of Aarhus and Randers. East and northeast of the village lies the forest of Lisbjerg Skov and immediately north are the large camping grounds of Aarhus Camping and a large authentic Japanese garden. Lisbjerg Forbrændingen is an important incineration plant and hazardous waste treatment facility and works as a landmark for this area. Lisbjerg is an old settlement and boasts a 12th-century church, one of the oldest in Denmark, but there are also new residential quarters here and a large new residential area is under construction west of the old village center. The new quarter, known as Lisbjerg Bakke (Lisbjerg Hill), is built to accommodate 20-25,000 new residents when it is finished. Several houses, apartments and a school have already been built as of 2015 and in 2017, Aarhus light rail is intended to have its end station here.

The old village church originally housed a Romanesque golden altar. The altar was removed from the church in 1867 and is now on display at the National Museum of Denmark. Since 1989, Moesgaard Museum has been carrying out archaeological excavations around Lisbjerg church. They have found traces of an important late Viking Age farmstead in this area, possibly indicating continuity between the centers of importance before and after the introduction of Christianity in Denmark. Egådalen was once a brackish water fjord and the slopes of the valley have been populated since the earliest Stone Age.

== Gallery ==
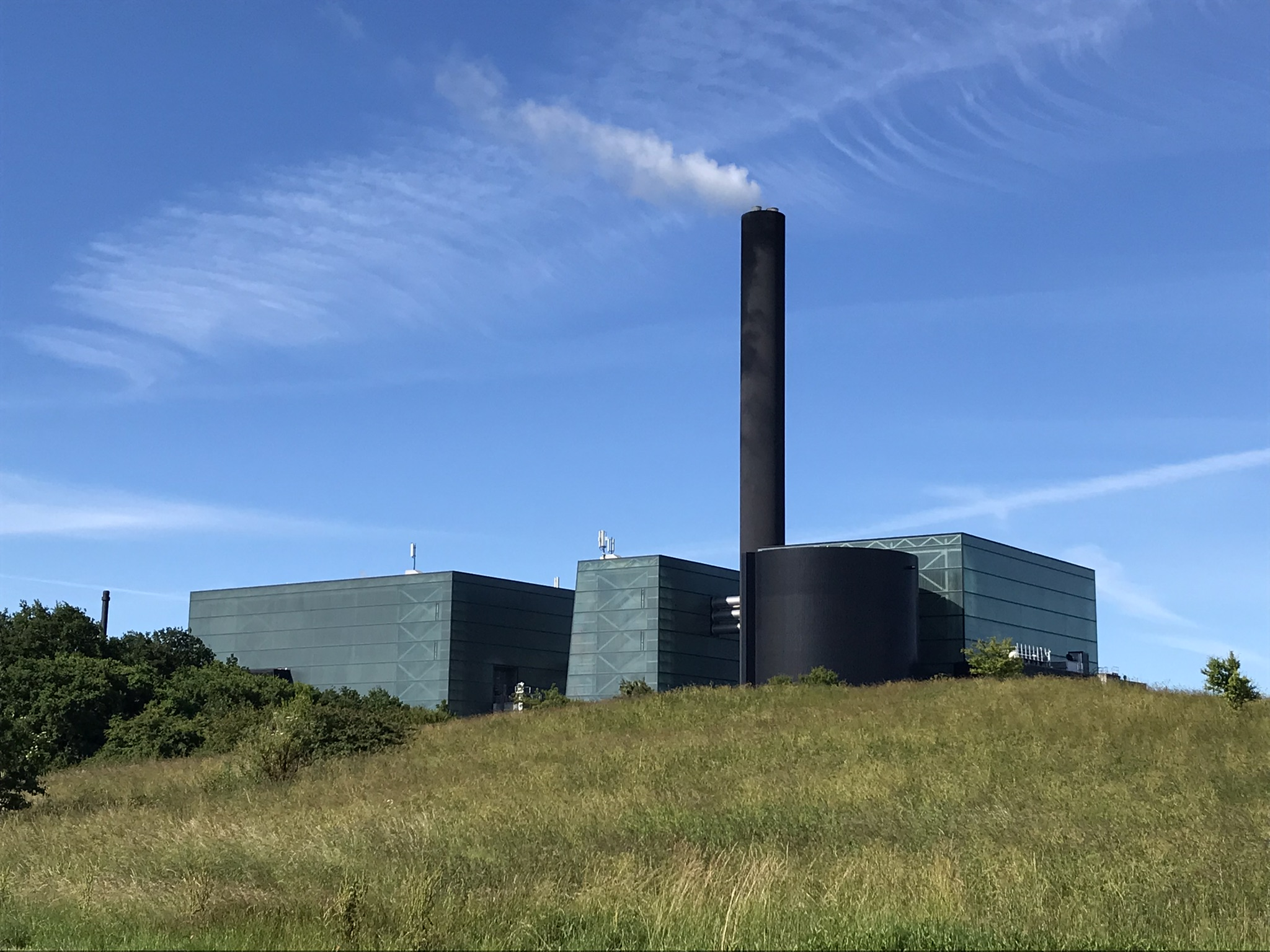
The incineration plant of Lisbjerg Forbrændingen is a landmark of the area.

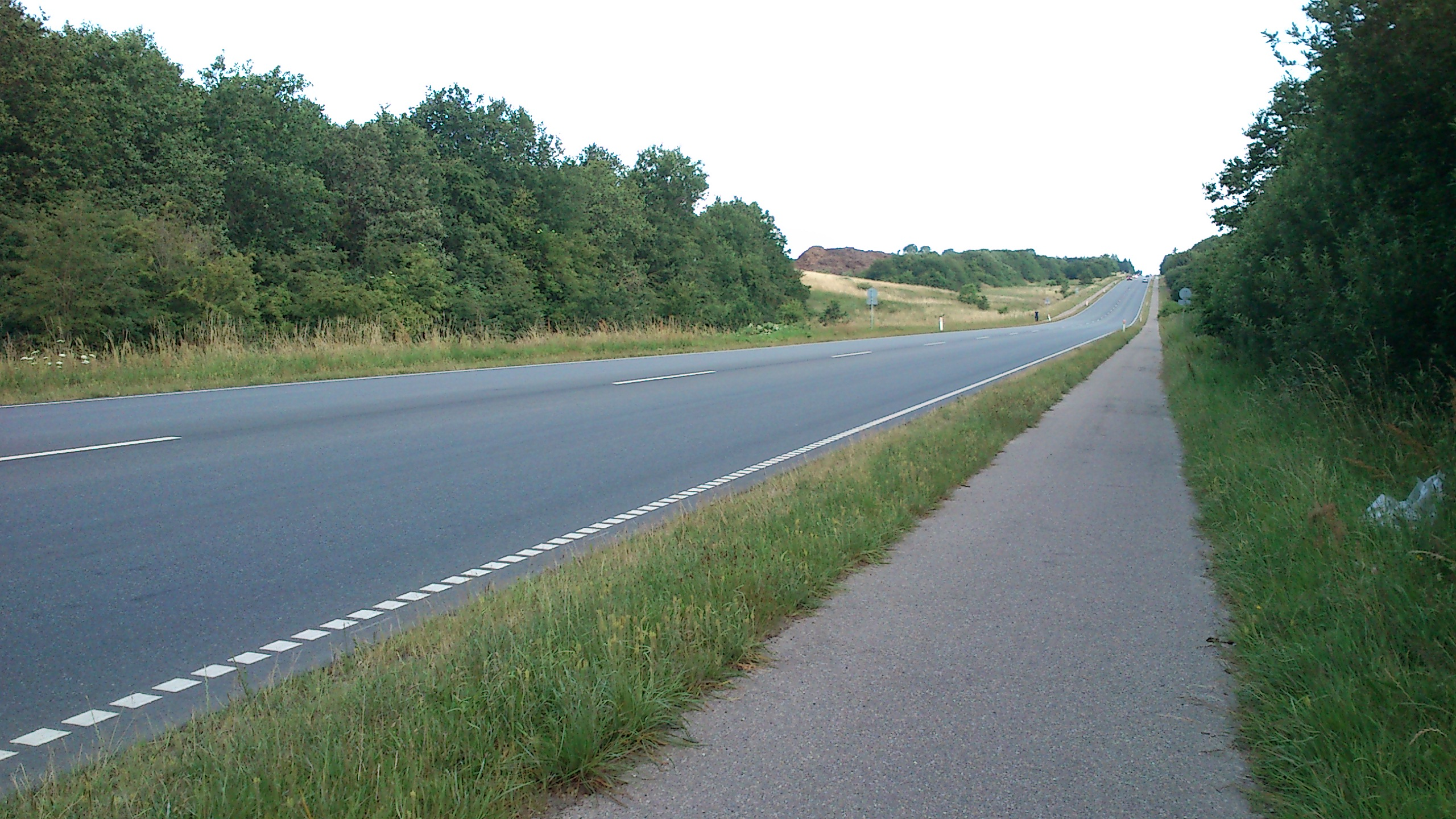
The main road of Randersvej cuts through Lisbjerg.

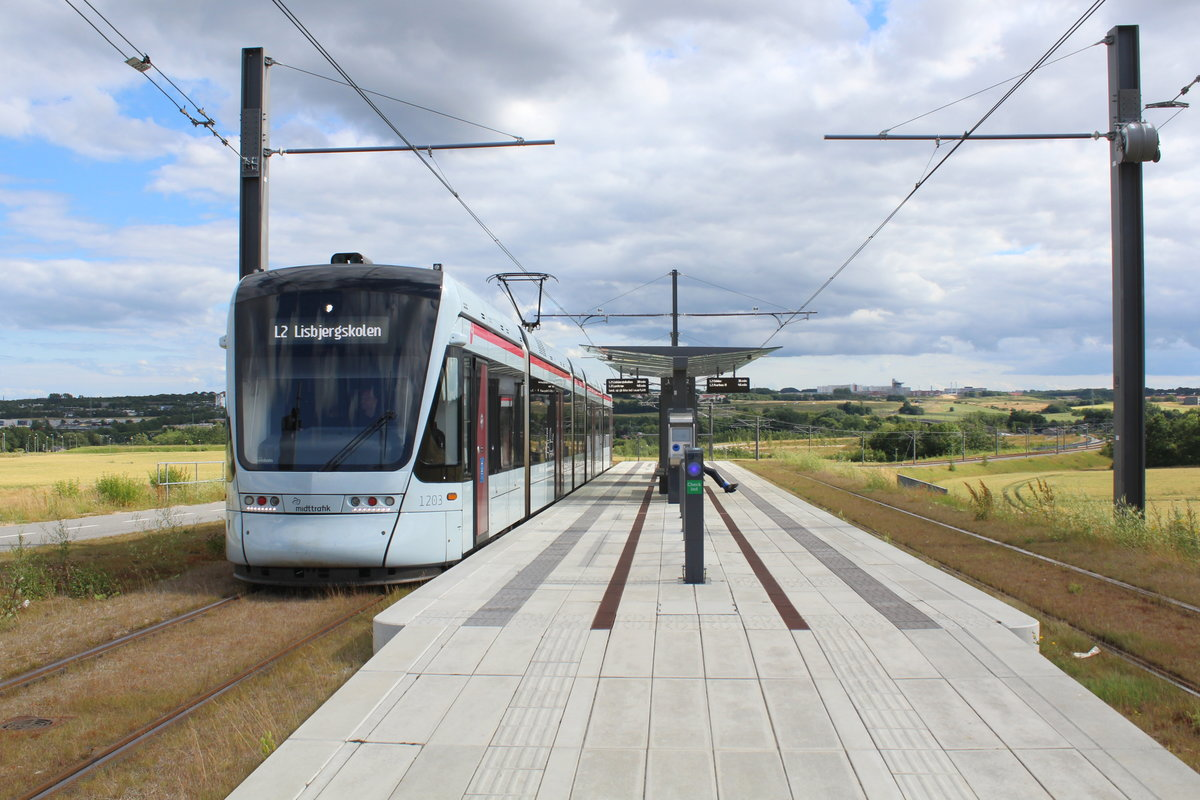
New Light rail connection

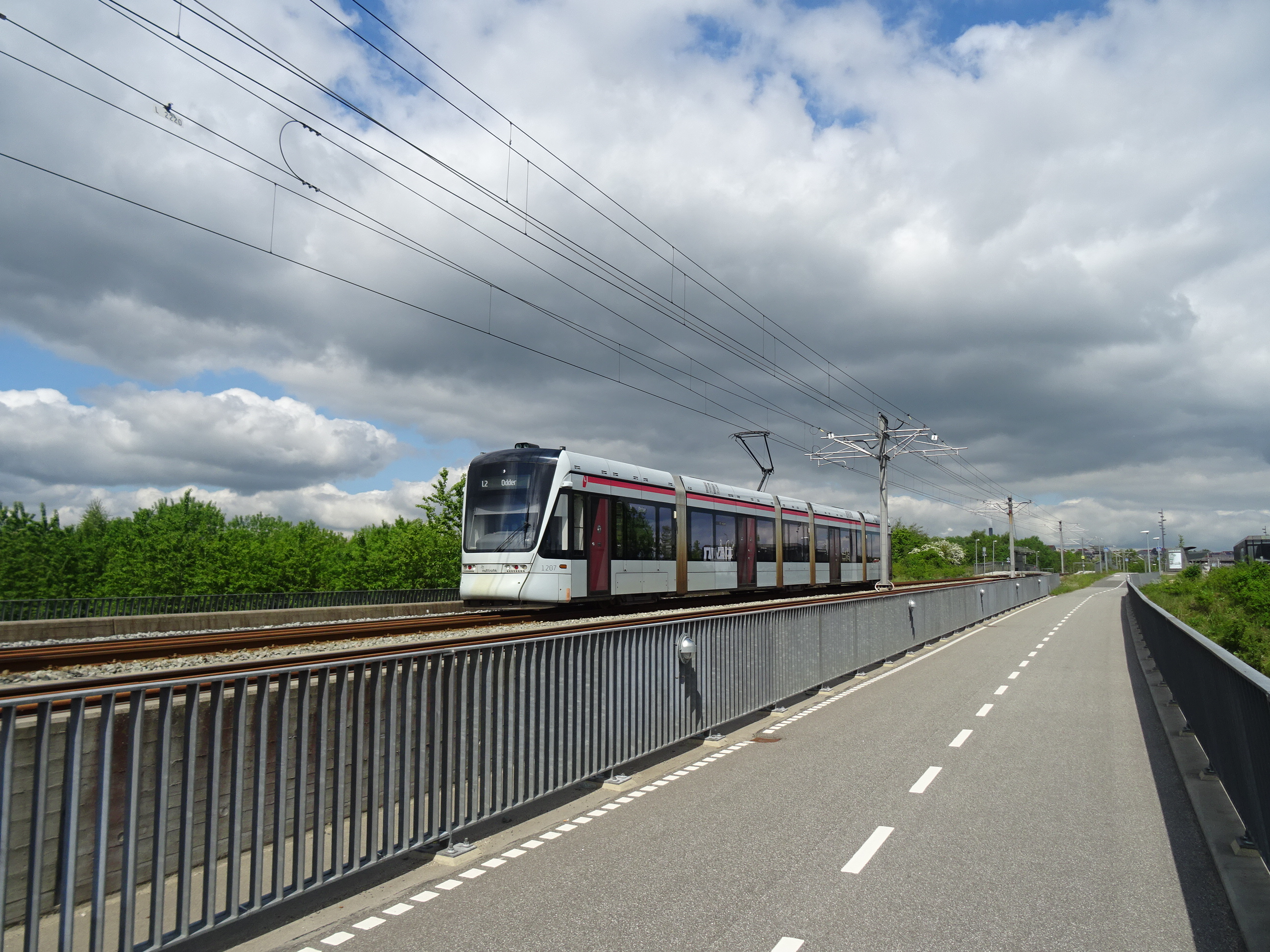
Bicycle road (Lisbjerg-Skejby Route)

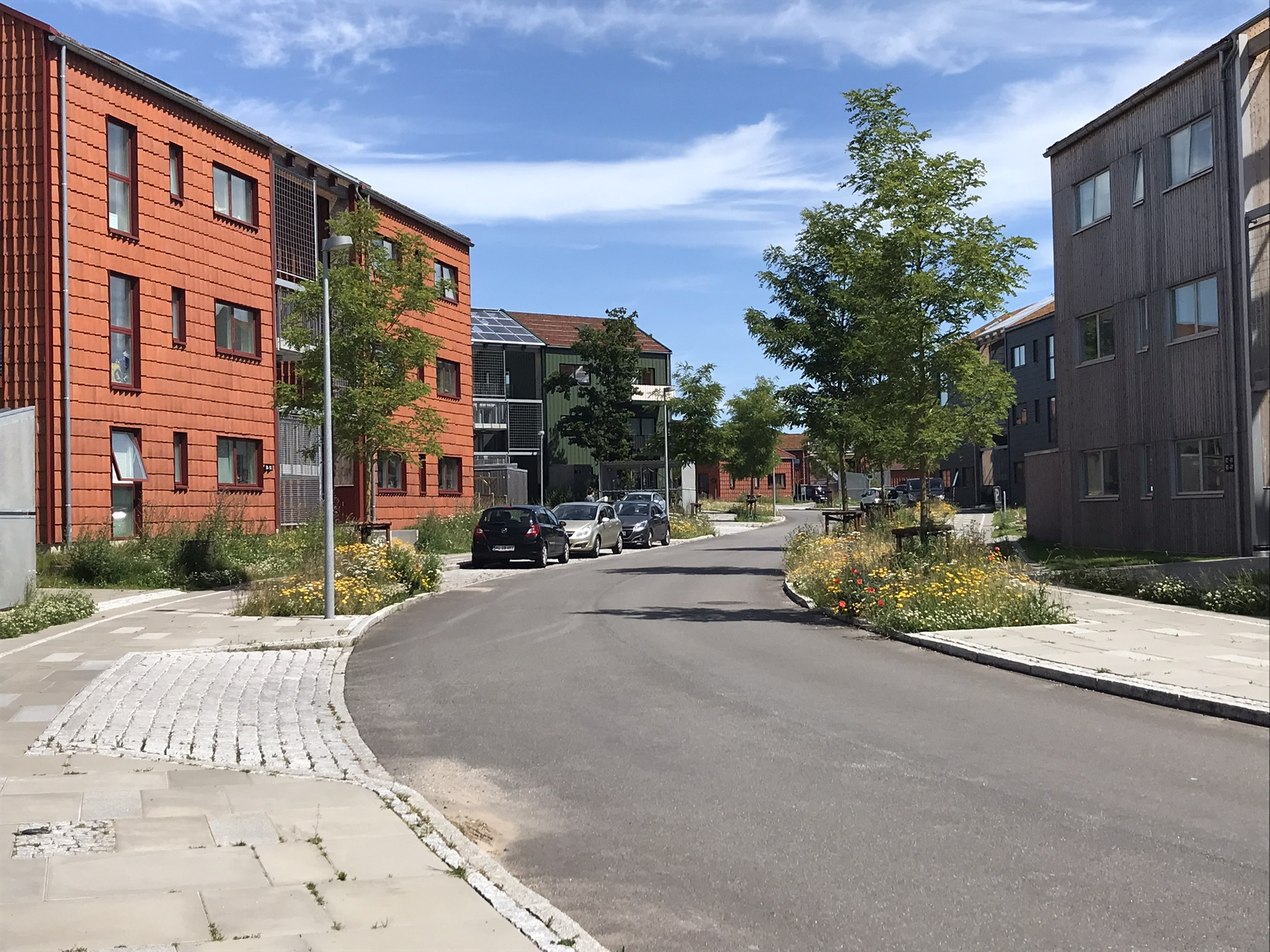
New roads and residential areas (built in 2022)

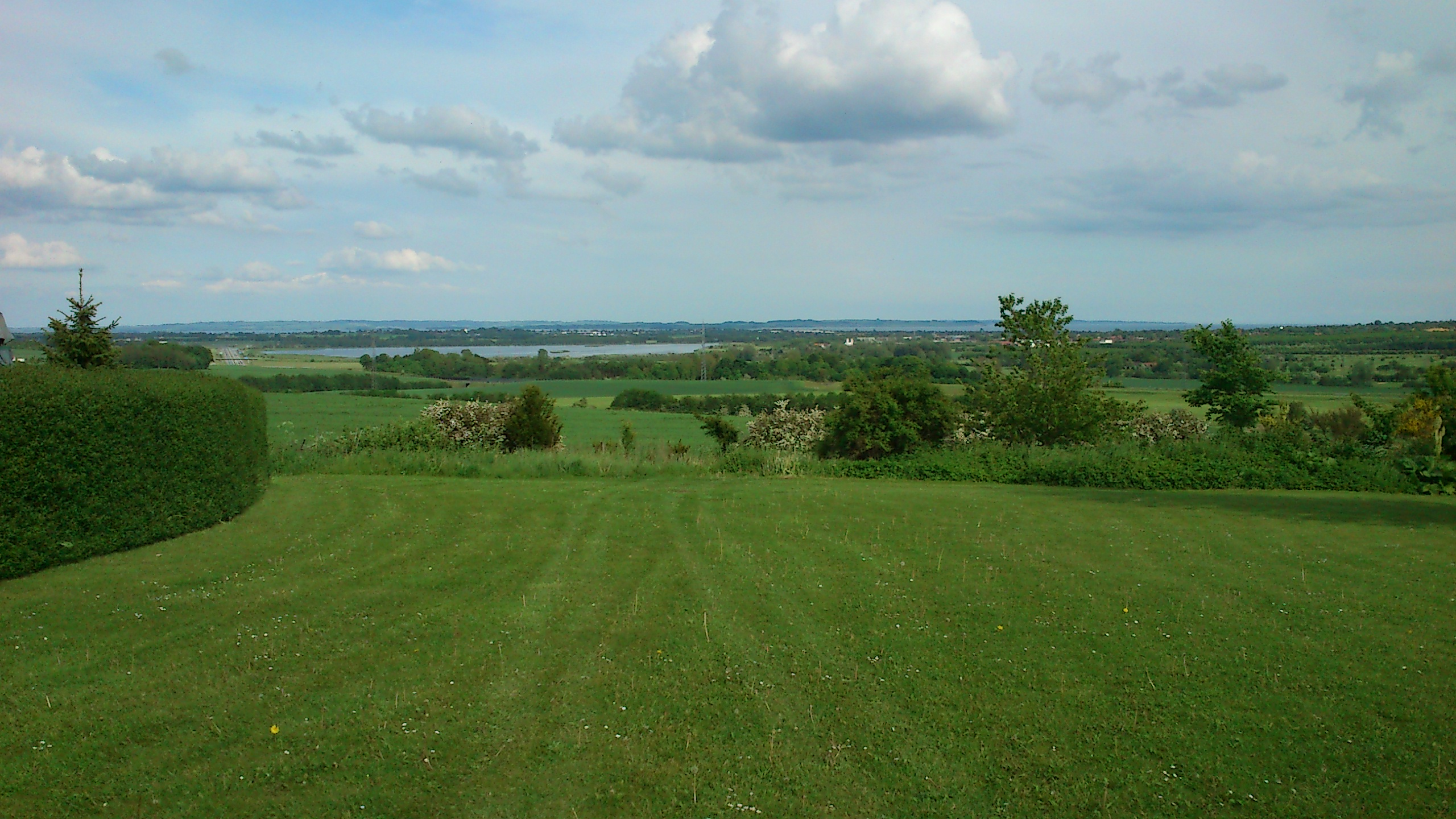
Lisbjerg offers a good view of the broad flat valley of Egådalen.

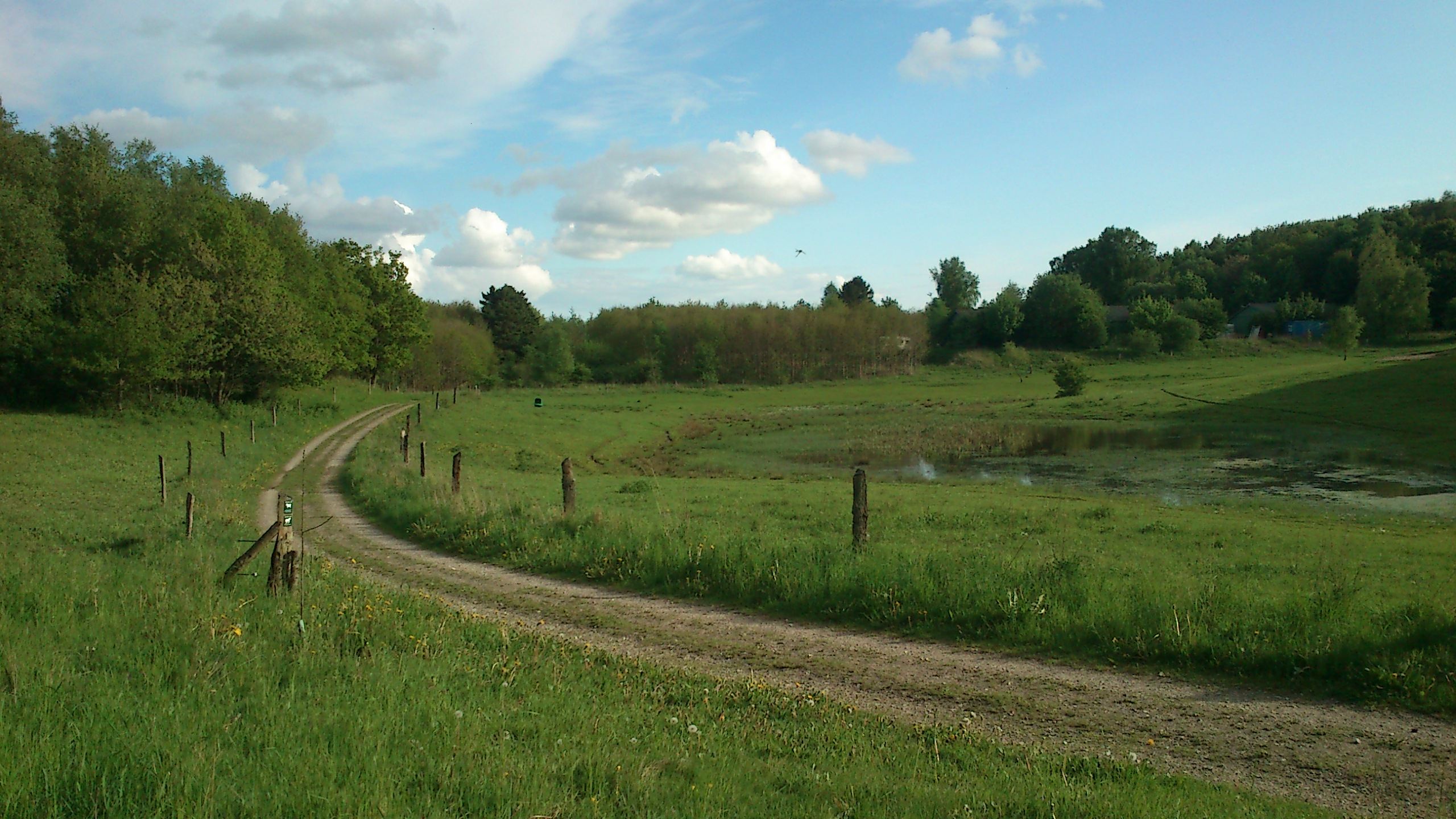
The forest of Lisbjerg Skov.

== History ==
=== Church and Viking Age farmstead ===
==== Farmstead ====
The farm excavated at Lisbjerg shows traces of three building phases, indicating that it existed for a significant time period. The phases were dated based on the style of some long houses found in the farmstead. Similar houses have been found at Gammel Hviding and Vilslev as well as the closing phase of Vorbasse. Relying on these parallels, the houses at Lisbjerg were placed no earlier than the beginning of the 11th century and no later than about 1100. A semi-spherical ceramic vessel type common in all phases of the farm was previously thought to have fallen out of use around 1000, but the long houses found at Lisbjerg are clearly a later development than Trelleborg-type houses of the late 10th century. The farmstead thus dates from the 11th century, which indicates that semi-spherical vessels remained in use after the year 1000 in Jutland.

In all three phases, the farm was at least partially surrounded by a fence. Relatively light in the earliest phase, by the latest it had developed into a substantial palisade surrounding a roughly rectangular patch of land of about 170 by 110 meters.

In addition to fences surrounding the farm area, a smaller one was found near the center of the farmstead. Owing to similarities with the palisade from the third phase, it is placed in the same time period. This fence would have partially surrounded the main farmhouse, traces of which have been found under the present stone church. The area inside this fence might be the "sheltered yard", a particular part of a farmstead which has special status in medieval law.

Two waste pits found from the farmstead area contained iron slag, while West Slav pottery highly popular in the Viking Age was found from a third. Yet another pit contained waste from metal crafts as well as glass of Roman and Byzantine origin.

==== Connection between farmstead and church ====
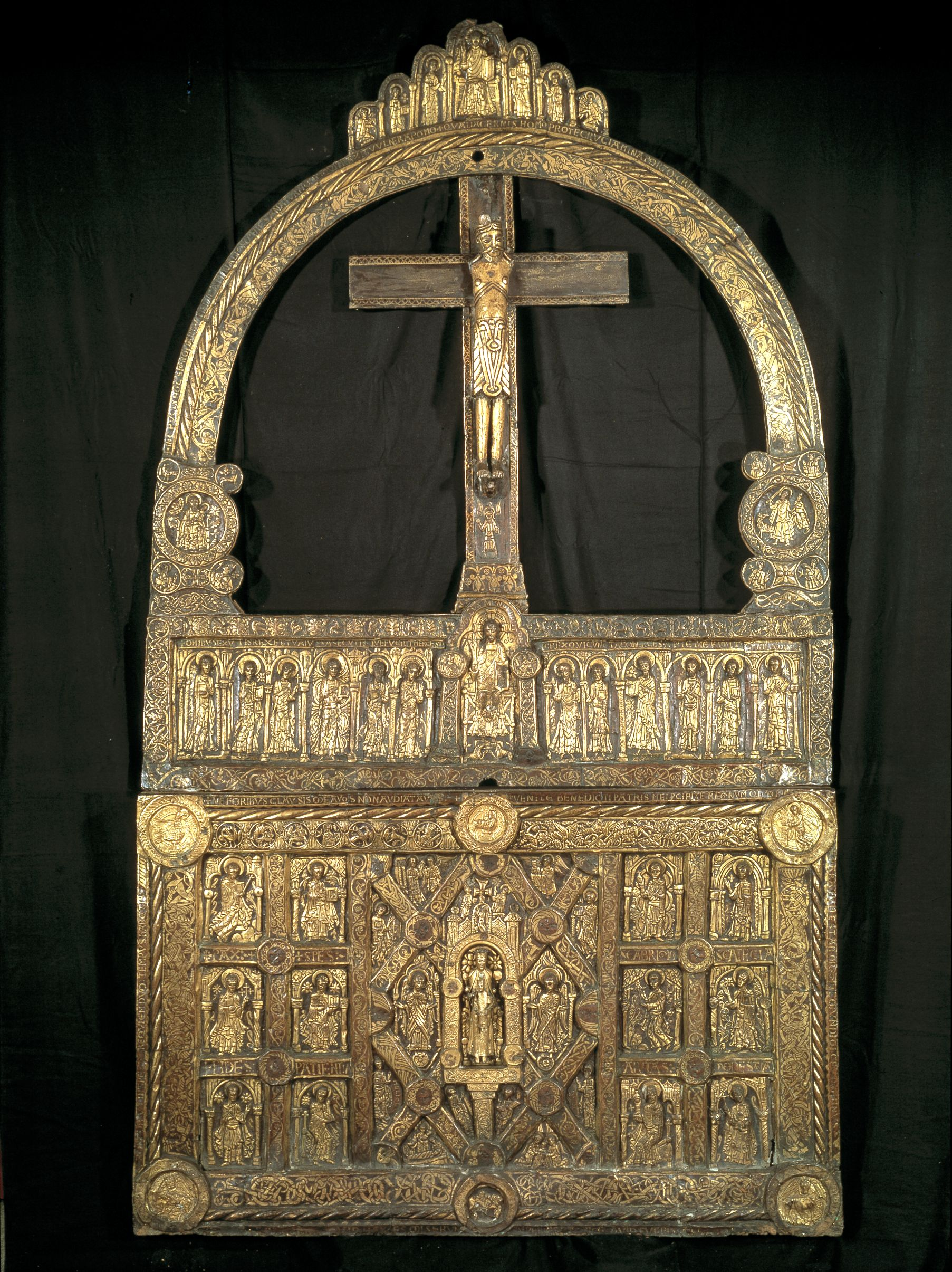
Golden altar from Lisbjerg stone church at the National Museum of Denmark

Under Lisbjerg stone church, remains of an earlier wooden church have been found in addition to the main farmhouse. The wooden church must have existed after the farmhouse, but before the 12th century stone church, which places it around the year 1100. The wooden church might have been located inside the farmstead after the removal of the main house. However, it is more likely that the wooden church was built only after the farmstead was demolished, as its orientation is different from the orientation of the fence surrounding the farmstead. In either case, their proximity in time implies a connection between the church and the farmstead. It is likely that the farm owner was involved in building the church.

==== Influence and importance ====
The particular importance of the Lisbjerg farm is emphasized by its large area and the strength of the surrounding palisade. Its isolated location on the east side of the important old road to Aarhus is also suitable for property belonging to a magnate or nobleman. Artifacts implying a contemporary village west of the road have been found. Moesgaard Museum has also found traces of a moat running across the road from Lisbjerg to Aarhus, which would have forced travelers to cross the stream of Egå just south of the village. The moat may have been used as a traffic control measure. It has not been dated, but a connection between the moat and the magnate farm at Lisbjerg is possible.

The farm may have had an important administrative function because the settlement at Lisbjerg has given its name to Lisbjerg herred, a division which already existed by the end of the 11th century. As the Lisbjerg settlement is located in the south-western part of the herred and far from its geographical center, it must have been all the more important in order to assume a central administrative role. If the farm owner at Lisbjerg was indeed powerful enough to hold authority over the whole herred, he would have been an obvious candidate for building a church upon the introduction of Christianity.

In general, placing the church on the site of an important farm can be associated with the continuity of power in the area. It is also possible that continuity of tradition or cult practices played a role, as pagan rituals may have been carried out at main houses of important farms during the Viking Age.

The farmstead was perhaps even a royal estate, given its location close to Aarhus, an important center of royal power. Upon the founding of the Diocese of Aarhus around 1060, the farm may have been donated to the church, perhaps becoming the bishop’s residence. This is supported by a written source from 1604 claiming that "Aarhus was moved in 1102 from Lisbjerg to the place where it now lies". If the statement is interpreted as referring to the relocation of the bishop’s residence to Aarhus, it would be reasonable to expect that the farmstead at Lisbjerg had become the bishop’s estate by 1102.

=== Bronze Age hoard ===
Lisbjerg area has also produced archaeological finds from the Bronze Age. In August 1933, a Late Bronze Age hoard was found in a gravel pit east of Nymølle farm near Lisbjerg. It includes three hanging vessels, five fibulas, a belt ornament, an awl, two casting jets and a piece of casting waste. The find has been dated to 1000-900 BC. It is significant as one of few Late Bronze Age hoards in the Aarhus area. Furthermore, the hoard contains equipment from at least three different women, which is very rare in all of Denmark.

== See also ==
- Christianization of Scandinavia
