= Sdr. Omme State Prison =

Open prison in Sdr. Omme, Denmark

Coordinates: 55°49′55″N 8°55′14″E

State Prison at Sdr. Omme
- Interactive map of State Prison at Sdr. Omme
- Location: Sdr. Omme, Region of Southern Denmark, Denmark.
- Status: Operational
- Population: 195
- Opened: 1933
- Managed by: The Danish Prison and Probation Service
- Warden: Thorsten H. Laursen

Sdr. Omme Prison (Danish: Sdr. Omme Fængsel), also known as the State Prison at Sdr. Omme (Danish: Statsfængslet ved Sdr. Omme), is an open prison located at Sdr. Omme in Denmark. The prison was established in 1933 as the State Workhouse at Sønder Omme (Danish: Statens Arbejdshus ved Sønder Omme) as a place where prison laborers took an active part in the cultivation of the moor and land on the prison ground. It became the State Prison at Sdr. Omme in 1973. Today the prison has about 1000 hectares of land and forestry and both plants and cattle are bred on the prison ground and surrounding areas.

== Capacity ==
The State Prison at Sdr. Omme mainly receives male offenders from Copenhagen and Jutland. It has space for 188 inmates, most of which are housed on the main unit of the prison. The remaining 22 are housed in a semi-open prison unit.

== Abuse treatment ==
The State Prison at Sdr. Omme also have a treatment and rehabilitation unit with a total capacity of 15. Here prisoners can get treatment for substance abuse around the clock. Some prisoners even have the option to get ambulatory treatment through external partners. In addition to drug rehabilitation treatment the prison also offers cognitive proficiency and anger management programs to prisoners.

== Employment ==
The prisoners at the State Prison at Sdr. Omme have the opportunity to work in a large range of different jobs during their imprisonment. The prisoners at this prison mostly work with either agriculture, forestry, horticulture, kitchen work and building maintenance.

== Education programs ==
The prisoners at the State Prison at Sdr. Omme can attend education programs in either Danish, Math, IT and other subjects inside the prison ground. Prisoners can also gain access to education outside the prison grounds based on their behavior, their sentence and whether they are a possible escape risk.
