= Filskov =

- Town
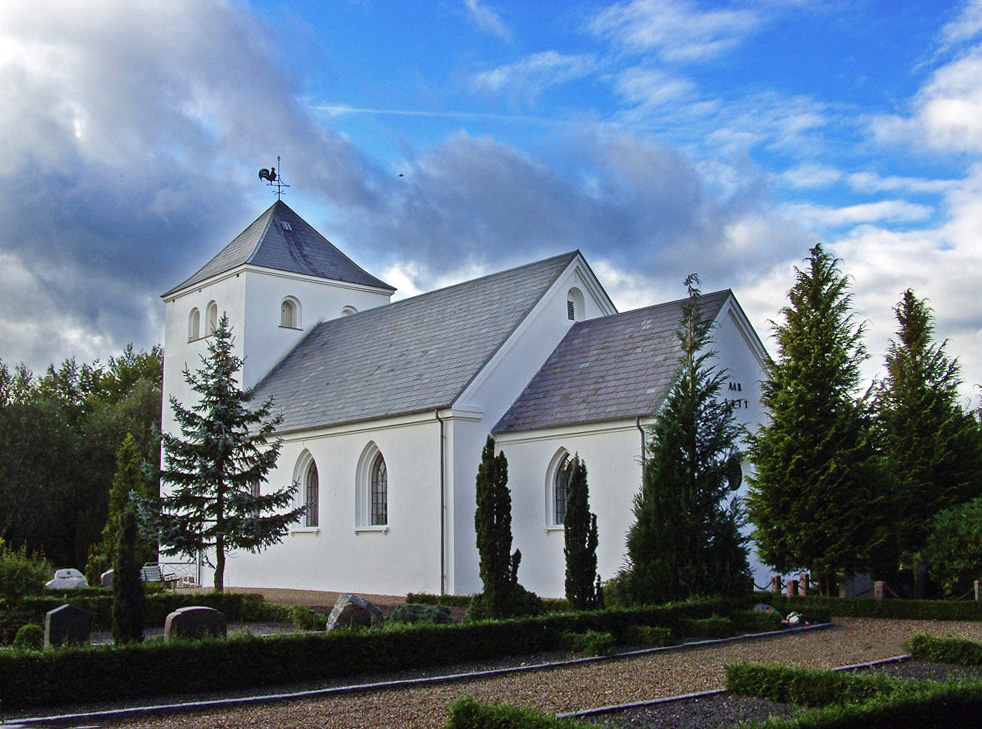
- Filskov Church

- Location in Denmark Filskov (Region of Southern Denmark)
- Coordinates: 55.81163°N 9.02765°E
- Country: Denmark
- Region: Region of Southern Denmark (Syddanmark)
- Municipality: Billund

Population (2026)
  - Total: 687
- Time zone: UTC+1 (CET)
  - Summer (DST): UTC+2 (CEST)
- Postal code: DK-7200 Filskov

Filskov is a town in Billund Municipality, Region of Southern Denmark in Denmark. It is located 39 km northwest of Vejle, 9 km east of Sønder Omme, 10 km northeast of Grindsted and 13 km northwest of Billund.

As of 1 January 2026, the population of Filskov was 687.

Filskov Church is located in the western part of the town. It was built in 1877 from drawings by the architect L.A. Winstrup. The tower was added in 1929.

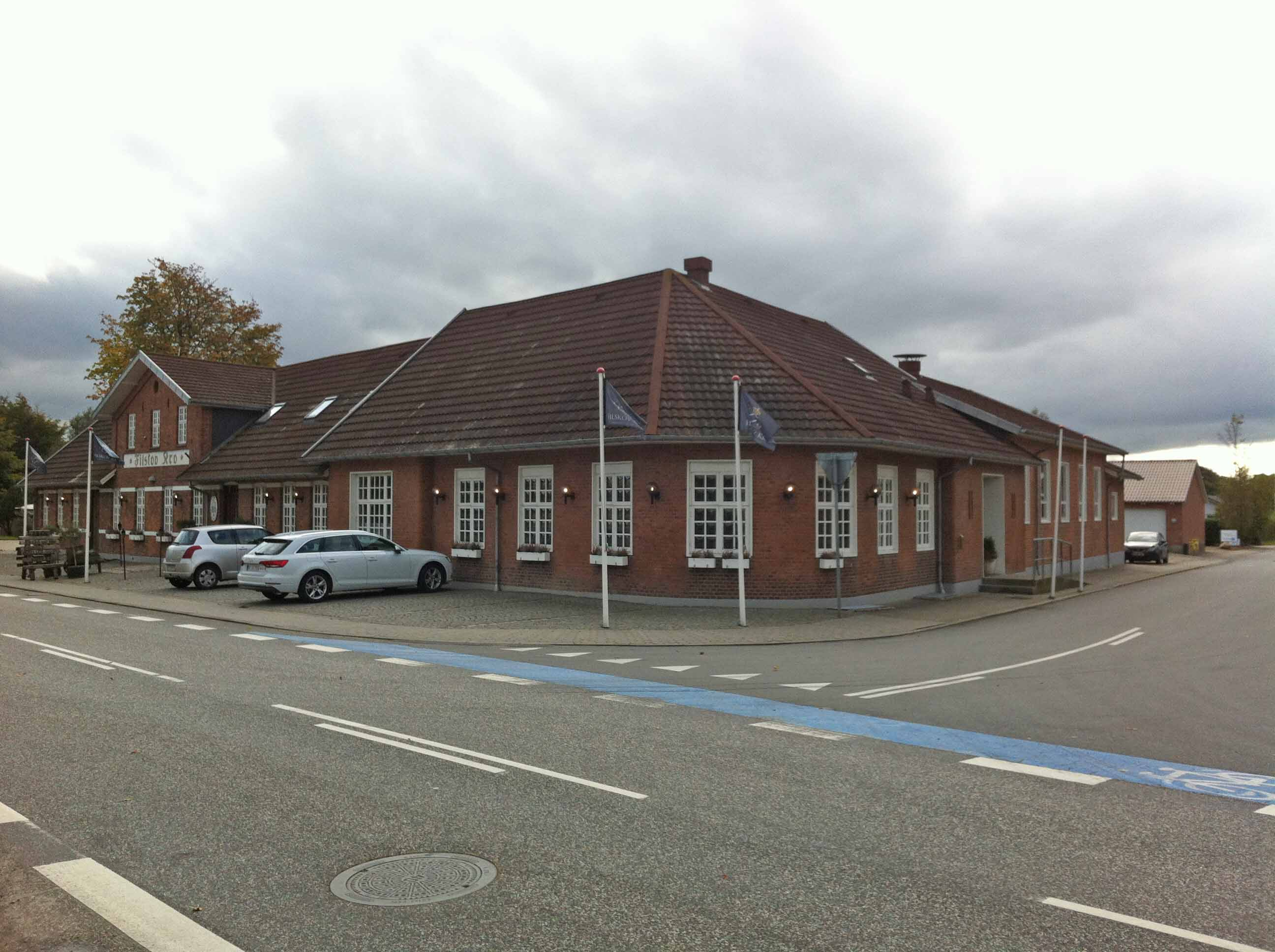
Filskov Kro (Filskov Inn)

Filskov Kro (Filskov Inn) is located in the eastern part of the town.

== Notable people ==
- Ole Kirk Christiansen (1891–1958), founder of The Lego Group.
