= Stenderup, Billund =

Stenderup
- Town
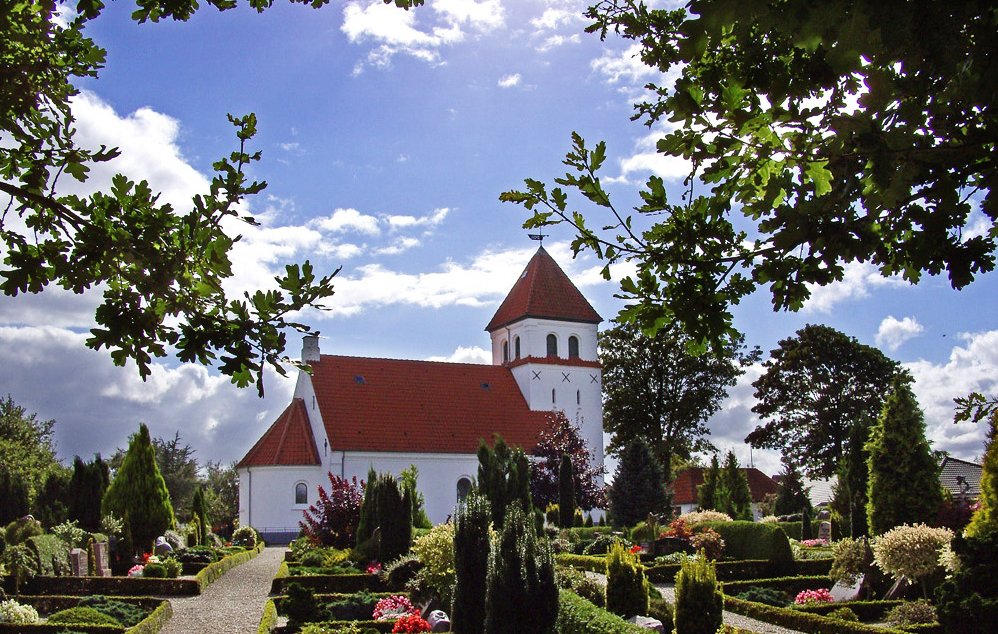
- Stenderup Church

- Location in Denmark Stenderup (Region of Southern Denmark)
- Coordinates: 55.69917°N 8.84127°E
- Country: Denmark
- Region: Region of Southern Denmark (Syddanmark)
- Municipality: Billund

Population (2026)
  - Total: 632
- Time zone: UTC+1 (CET)
  - Summer (DST): UTC+2 (CEST)
- Postal code: DK-7200 Stenderup

Stenderup or Stenderup-Kroager is a town in Billund Municipality, Region of Southern Denmark in Denmark. It is located 38 km northeast of Esbjerg, 9 km southwest of Grindsted and 21 km east of Billund.

As of 1 January 2026, the population of Stenderup was 632.
