= Lisbjerg Power Station =

Danish power plant

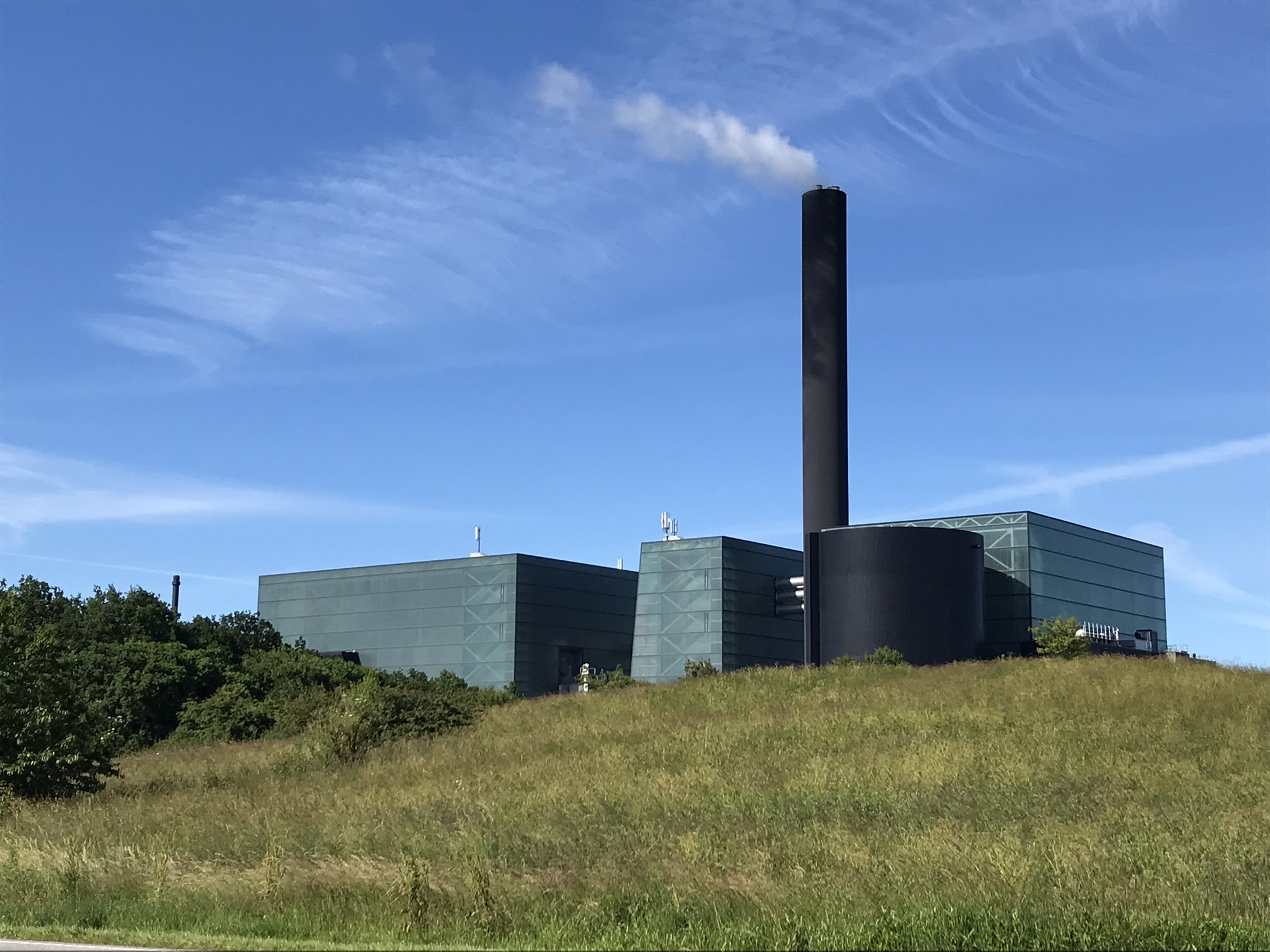
- Lisbjerg Power Station (2024)
- Official name: Lisbjerg Forbrændingen
- Country: Denmark
- Location: Lisbjerg, Denmark
- Coordinates: 56°13′40″N 10°09′30″E
- Construction began: 1976
- Commission date: 1978
- Owner: Aarhus Municipality
- Operator: Forsyningsselskabet Kredsløb

Thermal power station
- Primary fuel: Biomass (straw), Municipal waste
- Secondary fuel: Biomass (Wood chips)
- Cogeneration?: 153 MW total 77 MW from hay 76 MW from waste

Power generation
- Nameplate capacity: 54 MW total 37 MW from hay 18.9 MW from waste

External links
- Website: Kredsløb Energipark Lisbjerg
- Commons: Related media on Commons

Lisbjerg Power Station (Danish: Lisbjerg Forbrændingen) is a combined heat and power plant in Lisbjerg, Denmark. The power plant is composed of two units; a waste-to-power incinerator and a biomass plant, and is part of the larger waste treatment facility Kredsløb Energipark Lisbjerg. The official address is Ølstedvej 20-36, 8200 Aarhus N and it is managed by Forsyningsselskabet Kredsløb, as a part of the Teknik og Miljø (Technology and Environment) magistrate of Aarhus Municipality. The power station supplies electricity and district heating to Aarhus Municipality.

== History ==
The original waste-to-power incinerator was constructed in 1976-78 as a combined heat and power plant. The facility has been expanded and changed a number of times, most recently in 2014 to 2016.

In 2014, construction of a biomass plant (Biomassefyret Kraftvarmeværk) began as an addition to the existing facility. The biomass plant is a part of wider plan for Aarhus Municipality to transition to renewable energy sources. It will primarily burn hay, sourced from the local area. The two facilities share the same buildings and some of the infrastructure, but are managed as separate units, due to the differences in source and waste materials.

In 2025, Aarhus Municipality initiated a cooperation with international technology company Andritz AG for a carbon capture project at the power station. The aim is to capture 435.000 ton CO_{2} annually by 2029.

== Architecture ==
The architect firm Friis & Moltke designed the initial facility in 1978 and have since been involved in most major changes and renovations. The largest design change occurred in 2004 following a contest held in 1999 and won by Friis & Moltke. The old buildings were encased in a shell of concrete, steel and glass, which gives it a changing appearance depending on weather conditions. The overall design is divided in a "base" and a "glass shell" section. The base is a rigidly defined transport surface, somewhat lowered into the terrain and partially hidden. The glass shell is placed on the base and is a glass structure encasing the original concrete structure, while providing space for newer functions. A fissure in the shell makes room for the 110 meter chimney. The chaotic interior of boilers, pipes and machines can be discerned through the glass facade. Next to the power plant itself is a two story administration building, also with a glass facade, but in sharp contrast to the 4-5 times taller power plant structure.

Friis & Moltke also designed the addition of the biomass plant, which started construction in 2014 with completion in late 2016. The biomass plant is constructed in a similar style to the existing structure and the infrastructure is integrated; i.e. one shared chimney. The power plant is situated in hilly, undulating terrain and it is designed to fit the lines and colors of the surrounding landscape. It is prominently situated on a 70 meters tall hill and is a landmark visible from afar.

== Kredsløb Energipark Lisbjerg ==
Kredsløb Energipark Lisbjerg, is the name of the larger waste treatment facility, that includes the Lisbjeg power station. Other services comprise a recycling station, a toxic waste center, and a number of waste disposal systems, situated around the power plant. Annually, the waste treatment facility processes 670.000 metric tons of waste, of which 225.000 tons are used for energy production. It can process 23 tons of waste per hour and produces 76 MV heat for district heating and 18.9 MV electricity. Annually, it produces 470.000 MWh heat and 120.000 MWh electricity. The waste products are 40.000 tons of slag, 2700 tons of metal recyclables, and 7000 tons of residual waste from flue gas treatment. The flue gas waste is exported, while slag is used in place of gravel for road fill.

=== Biomass boiler ===
A new biomass combined heat and power plant was added to the Lisbjerg power plant in 2016. Construction began in 2014 and was completed in 2016. The biomass plant annually processes 230.000 metric tons of hay and has storage for 3168 haybales which cover 66 hours of production. The biomass plant is rated for 37 MV of electricity production and 77 MV of heating (110 MW primary energy). The plant is designed primarily for hay but can use up to 50% wood chips. Some 4% of the burned matter is converted to ash which is sold as fertilizer for agriculture. The plant is one of the largest of its kind in Denmark, and apart from electricity, it supplies district heating to 20% of Aarhus citizens.

== See also ==
- List of power stations in Denmark
