= Sun-Air of Scandinavia =

Regional airline of Denmark

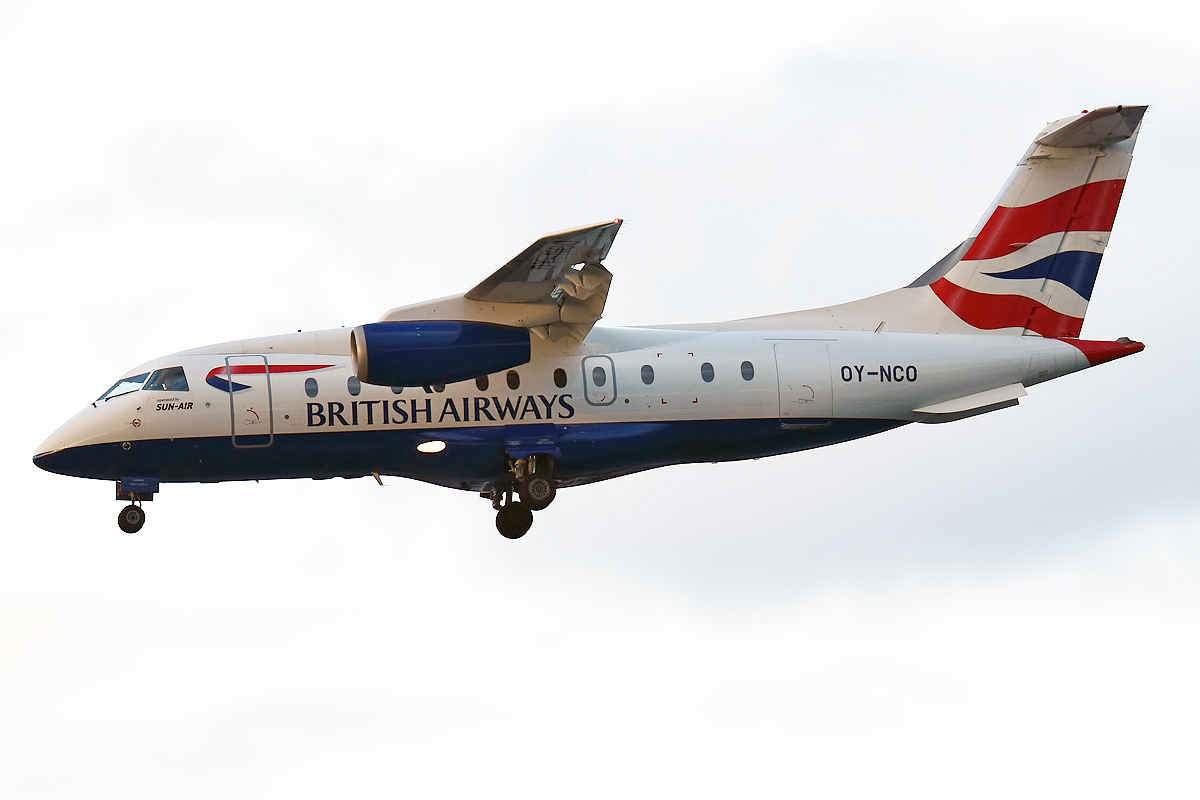
- Dornier 328JET
IATA	ICAO	Call sign
EZ	SUS	SUNSCAN
- Founded: 1978; 48 years ago
- Hubs: Billund Airport
- Fleet size: 11
- Destinations: 0 (scheduled)
- Headquarters: Billund, Denmark
- Key people: Niels Sundberg (Owner, CEO and pilot); Kristoffer Sundberg (co-CEO and pilot)
- Website: www.sun-air.dk

Logo used for British Airways services

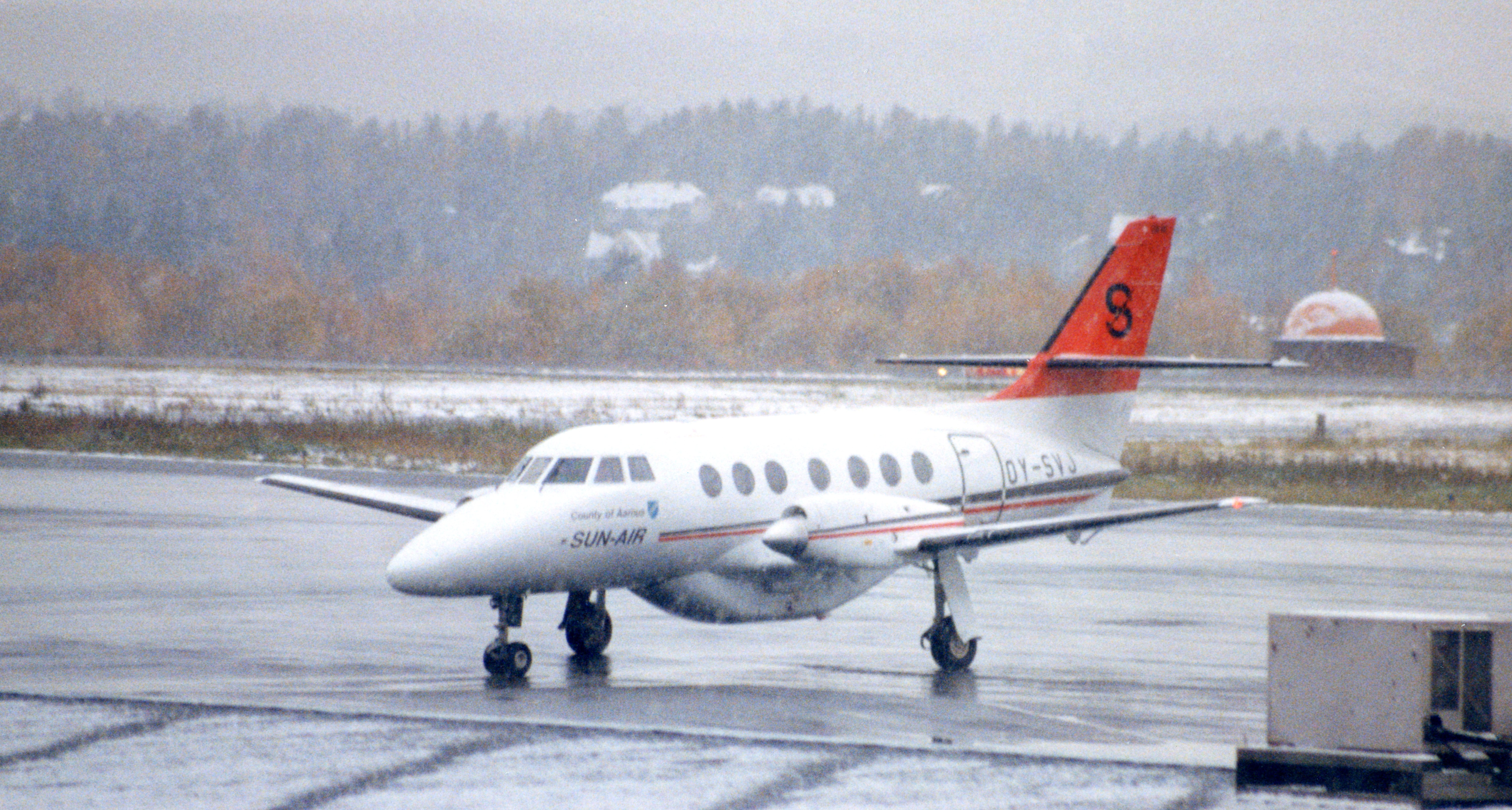
British Aerospace Jetstream 31s with which scheduled services were started

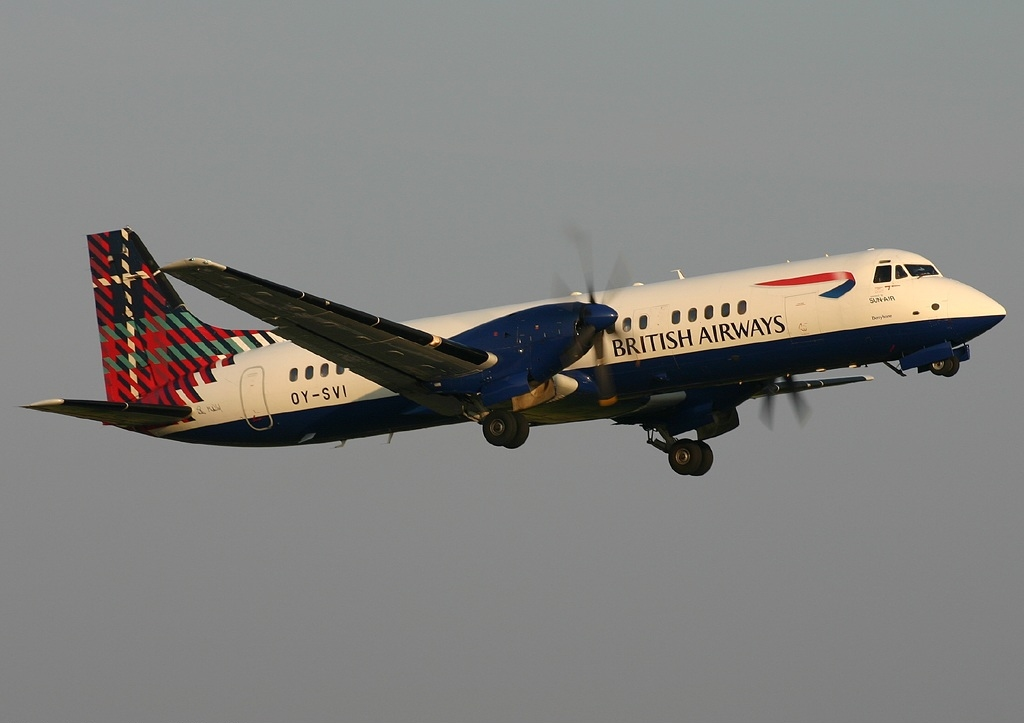
BAe ATP in the first British Airways livery in 2004

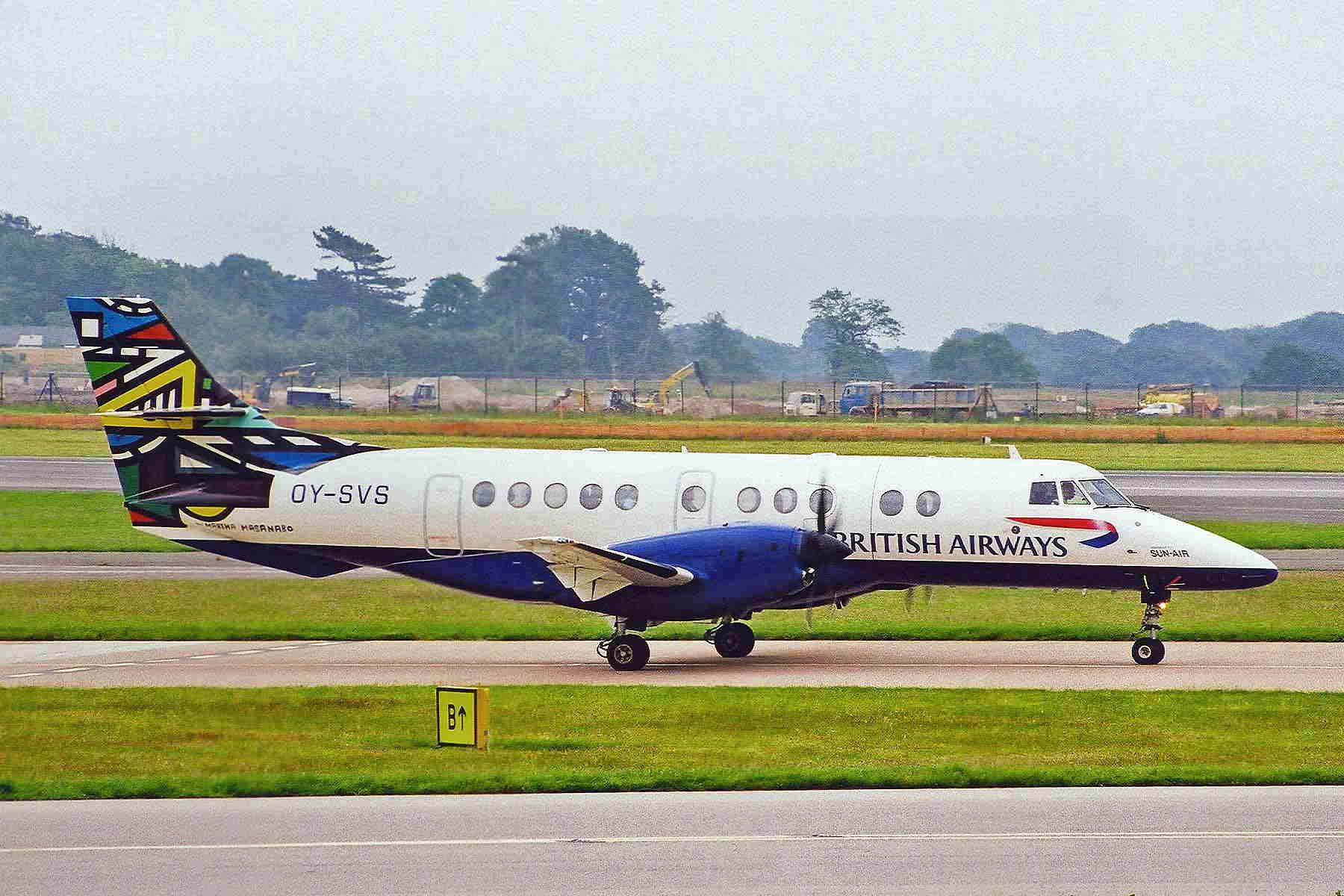
BAe Jetstream 41

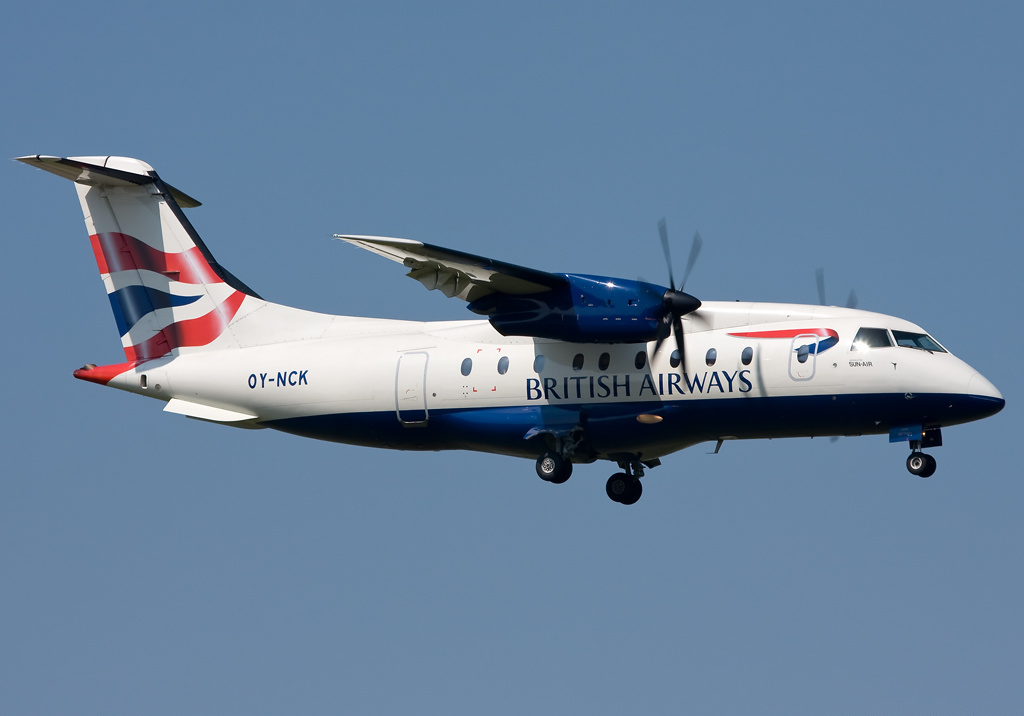
Dornier 328-100

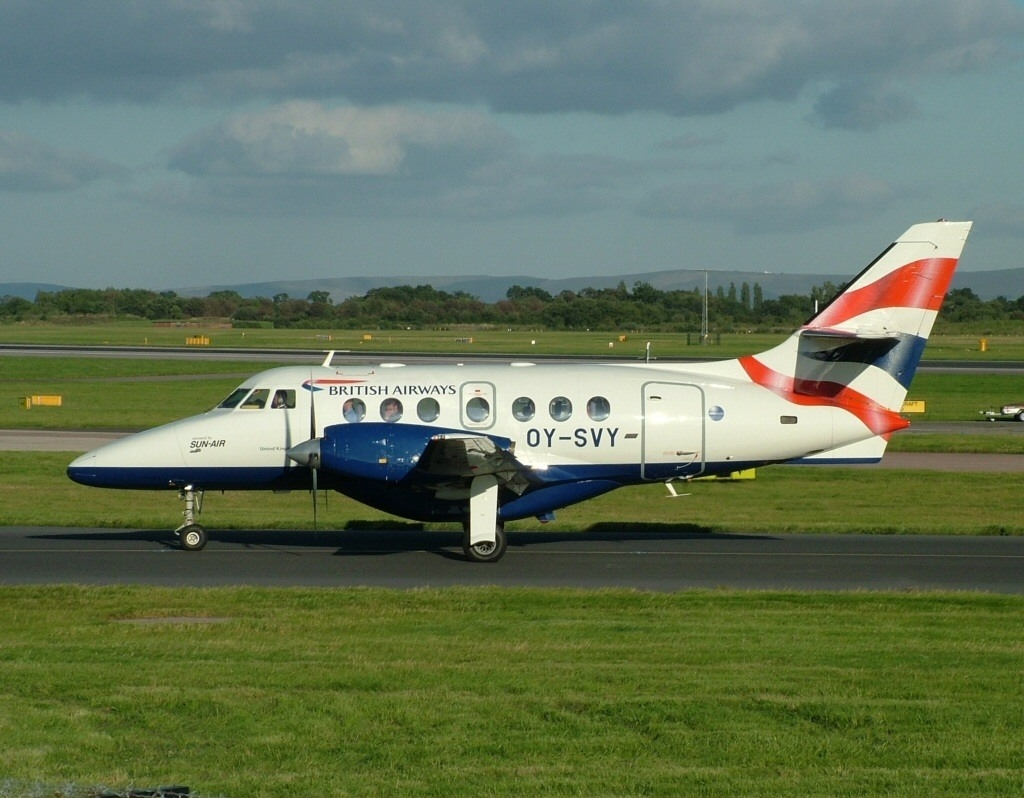
British Aerospace Jetstream 31s in the latest British Airways livery

Sun-Air of Scandinavia A/S, usually shortened Sun-Air, is a Danish charter airline headquartered in Billund, with its main base at Billund Airport. It used to operate scheduled services as a franchise of British Airways using their name and corporate design as British Airways - operated by SUN-AIR of Scandinavia A/S. The airline announced it would end its scheduled operations in March 2025 and concentrate on charter flights, air taxi services, specialist aerial work and aircraft brokerage services.

== History ==
=== Early years ===
The airline was established by Niels Sundberg in 1978 and commenced operations in that same year. The company initially operated solely as an air taxi and charter service. During 1987, the decision was taken to develop the company into a regional airline. Flights on Lufthansa behalf lasted from 1990 to 1991 when the air carrier went on operating on its own.

On 1 August 1996, Sun-Air became a franchisee of the large United Kingdom-based airline British Airways, being the first regional airline outside of the UK to commit to a franchise agreement with the airline. Starting that month, Sun-Air services would form a network linking with British Airways' own services at Copenhagen, Oslo and Stockholm. Under the British Airways franchisee arrangement, all scheduled services were operated under the British Airways Express brand. In accordance with this branding, Sun-Air's scheduled flights are operated with British Airways logo and trademark being prominently displayed on the fuselages. During the late 1990s, Danish artist Per Arnoldi designed the tail art for the new livery applied to Sun-Air's fleet; the livery has since been redesigned to incorporate the Union Jack flag on the tailfin instead. By 1996, the airline was conducting around 250 departures each week and carrying roughly 120,000 passengers annually; at the time, Sun-Air's fleet comprises ten 18-seat British Aerospace Jetstream 31s and two 30-seat British Aerospace Jetstream 41s.

=== Developments since the 2000s ===
Part of the reason Sun-Air had agreed to become a franchisee was to gain a strategic partner, particularly one that would be able and willing to assist in its growth and the acquisition of larger aircraft. During the late 1990s, Sun-Air initiated a long-term plan to introduce jet-powered airliners into its fleet by 2000. As a step towards this, and to help it handle increasing passenger traffic on its routes between Denmark and Britain, it acquired a pair of second-hand British Aerospace ATPs in late 1997. During 2001, in response to a complaint by Sun-Air, rival airlines Scandinavian Airlines and Maersk Air were fined around €52 million ($44 million) for engaging in anti-competitive behaviour following an investigation by the European Union.

During 2009, it was decided to restructure Sun-Air's charter division, leading to it being rebranded as JoinJet; Niels Sundberg's son, Kristoffer Sundberg, was appointed to head this subsidiary. Focusing largely on business jet operations, JoinJet taken steps to build an individual identity, including the adoption of a unique livery and distinct logo. It maintains a separate employee roster, which includes pilots, flight attendants, flight coordinators, and its own sales team.

According to Sun-Air, the company has traditionally placed an emphasis on providing passengers with a comprehensive service; as such, all scheduled flights have included provisions for meals, drinks, and luggage as default since 2009. The airline has been awarded multiple prizes related to its service quality, including the award of Best European Airline at the Danish Travel Awards.

In April 2014, Sun-Air launched a new daily services between Billund and Zürich in Switzerland, served by its Dornier 328Jets. During the 2010s, Sun-Air became the biggest civil operator of the 328JET. On 25 February 2017, British Airways terminated its flights from Bremen to London and Manchester which were both operated by Sun-Air; the latter had maintained a base for these routes at Bremen Airport.

During 2017, Kristoffer Sundberg took over as CEO of Sun-Air while Niels Sundberg remained chairman of the board. The airline is wholly owned by Niels Sundberg and had 175 employees as of 2019.

In the wake of the COVID-19 pandemic, Sun-Air terminated several routes. In January 2021, the company filed for insolvency for its German operational subsidiary Sun-Air of Germany and laid off most of its Germany based staff.

In March 2025, Sun-Air stopped its last remaining scheduled route between Billund Airport and London-City, ending 34 years of scheduled operations and their affiliation with British Airways. Citing a changed market, the airline uncovered plans to focus on any kind of not scheduled operations.

== Destinations ==
As of 2026, it only focuses on charter operations.

As of April 2024, Sun-Air served the following destinations as a British Airways franchisee:

Country	City	Airport	Notes
Belgium	Brussels	Brussels Airport	Terminated
Denmark	Aarhus	Aarhus Airport	Terminated
Denmark	Billund	Billund Airport	Terminated
France	Toulouse	Toulouse Airport	Terminated
Germany	Bremen	Bremen Airport	Terminated
Germany	Düsseldorf	Düsseldorf Airport	Terminated
Germany	Friedrichshafen	Friedrichshafen Airport	Terminated
Germany	Hamburg	Hamburg Airport	Terminated
Germany	Munich	Munich Airport	Terminated
Norway	Bergen	Bergen Airport, Flesland	Terminated
Norway	Oslo	Oslo Airport, Gardermoen	Terminated
Norway	Stavanger	Stavanger Airport, Sola	Terminated
Sweden	Gothenburg	Göteborg Landvetter Airport	Terminated
Sweden	Stockholm	Stockholm Bromma Airport	Terminated
United Kingdom	Cambridge	Cambridge City Airport	
United Kingdom	Kingston upon Hull	Humberside Airport	Terminated
United Kingdom	London	London City Airport	Terminated
United Kingdom	Manchester	Manchester Airport	Terminated

== Fleet ==
=== Current fleet ===
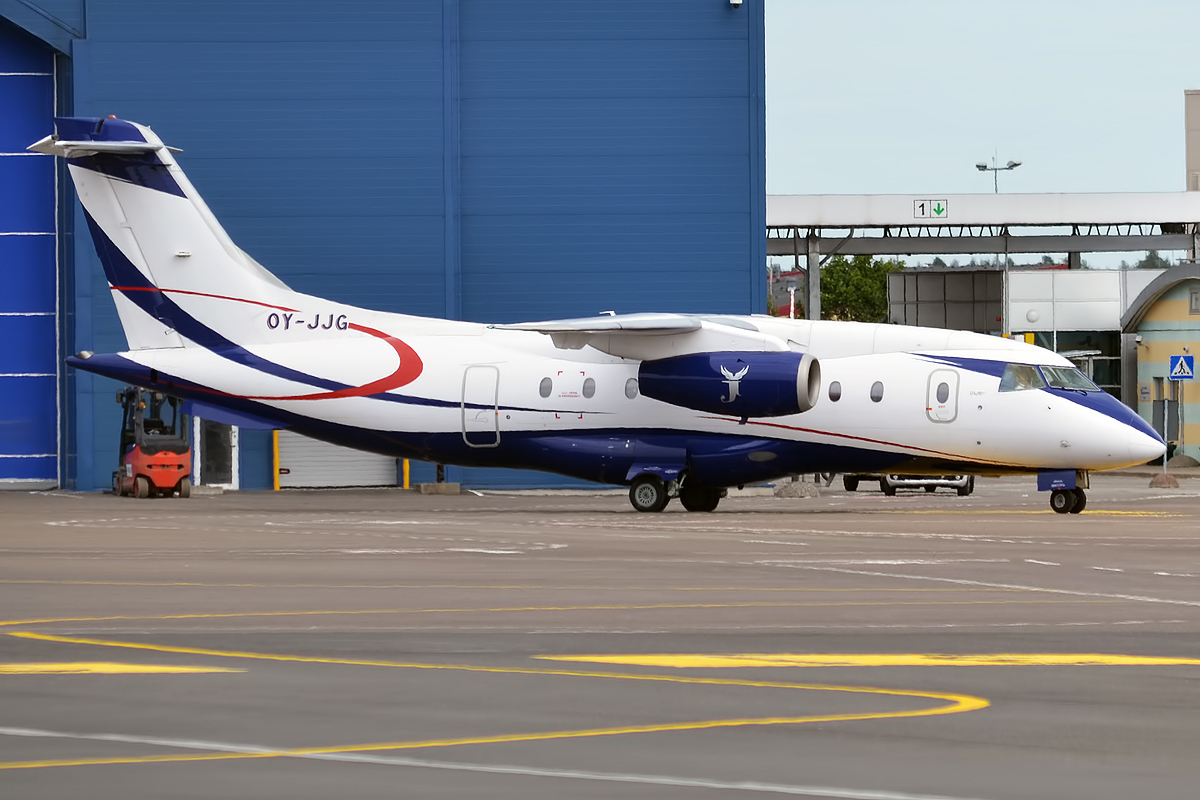
Dornier 328JET in Air Peace colours

As of July 2026, Sun-Air of Scandinavia operates the following aircraft:

Sun-Air fleet
Aircraft	Total	Passengers	Notes
Dornier 328JET	11	32	
Total	11		

=== Former fleet ===
As of October 2024, Sun-Air operated 8 Dornier 328JET (4 operated under British Airways franchise until March 2025, 3 operated for JoinJet and 1 stored)

== Subsidiaries ==
In 1993, Sun-Air opened its workshop at Aarhus Airport. During 1993, Sun-Air acquired 10% of Thisted-based North-West Air Service; over the following years, it would purchase the company outright. Sun-Air's maintenance division largely focuses on performing extensive aircraft overhauls, commonly replacing elements such as the landing gear, composite materials, wheels and brakes. Following the acquisition of aircraft maintenance company ScanTech (Scandinavian Aircraft Technologies A/S) in November 2014, maintenance of the company's Hawker Beechcraft aircraft was moved to the latter's facilities at Sindal Airport shortly thereafter. On 1 May 2016, Sun-Air Technic was formed by the merger of ScanTech and Sun–Air's workshops and warehouses. In 2015, Sun-Air acquired shares in Avex Technical, leading to the company cooperating with Avex Air in the South African market to perform aircraft maintenance and overhaul services.
