= Hejnsvig =

- Town
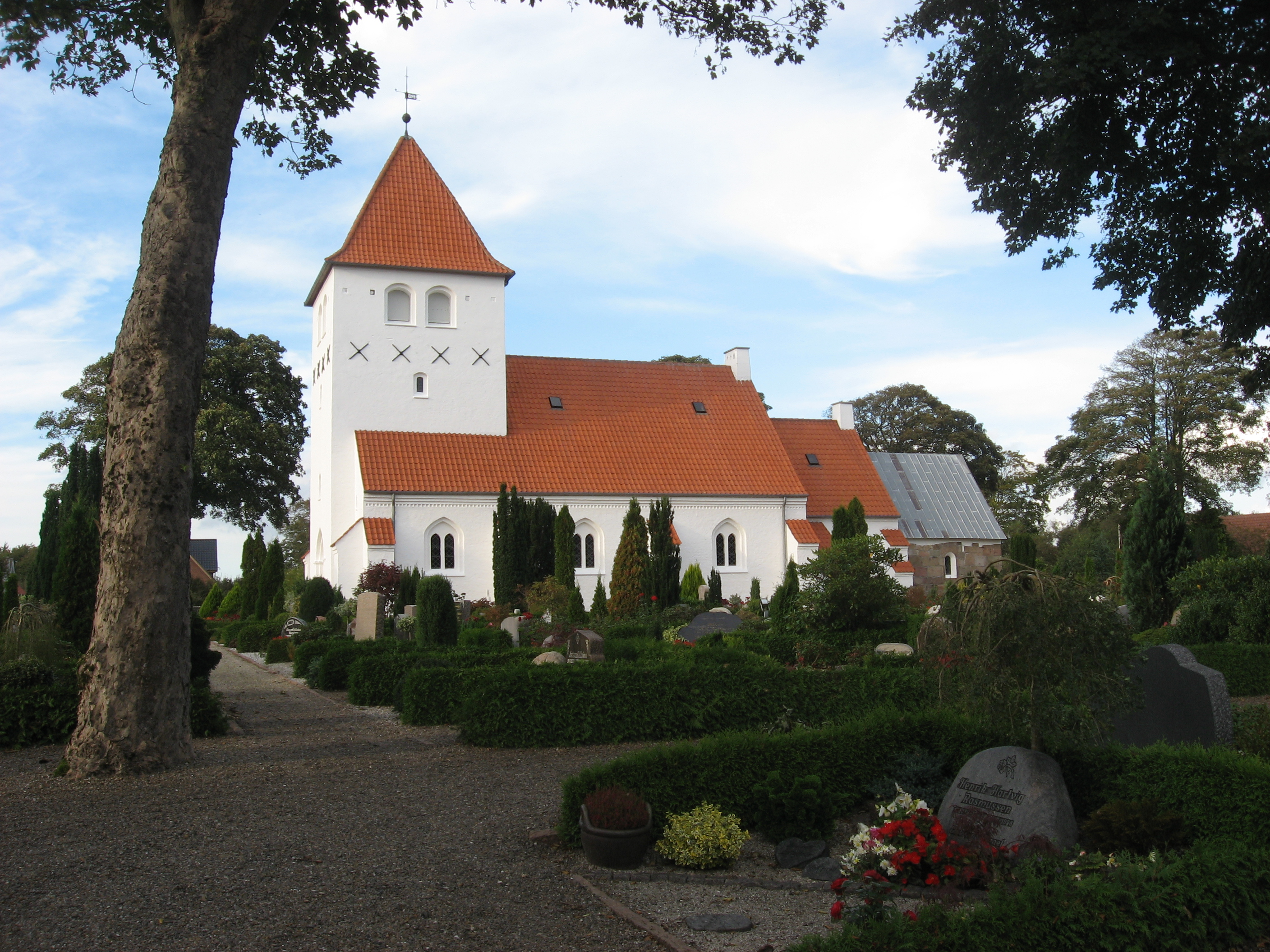
- Hejnsvig Church

- Location in Denmark Hejnsvig (Region of Southern Denmark)
- Coordinates: 55.69445°N 8.97705°E
- Country: Denmark
- Region: Region of Southern Denmark (Syddanmark)
- Municipality: Billund

Area
  - Urban: 0.9 km^{2} (0.35 sq mi)

Population (2026)
  - Urban: 1,019
  - Urban density: 1,100/km^{2} (2,900/sq mi)
- Time zone: UTC+1 (CET)
  - Summer (DST): UTC+2 (CEST)
- Postal code: DK-7200 Hejnsvig

Hejnsvig is a town in Billund Municipality, Region of Southern Denmark in Denmark. It is located 30 km northwest of Vejen, 10 km southwest of Billund and 11 km southeast of the municipal seat Grindsted .

As of 1 January 2026, the population of Hejnsvig was 1,019.

Hejnsvig Church is located in the town. It was built in the 14th century, when it replaced a church from the 13th century probably made of wood.

== Notable people ==
- Otto Brandenburg (1934–2007), musician and actor was born in Hejnsvig.
