= Billund Airport =

Billund Airport Billund Lufthavn

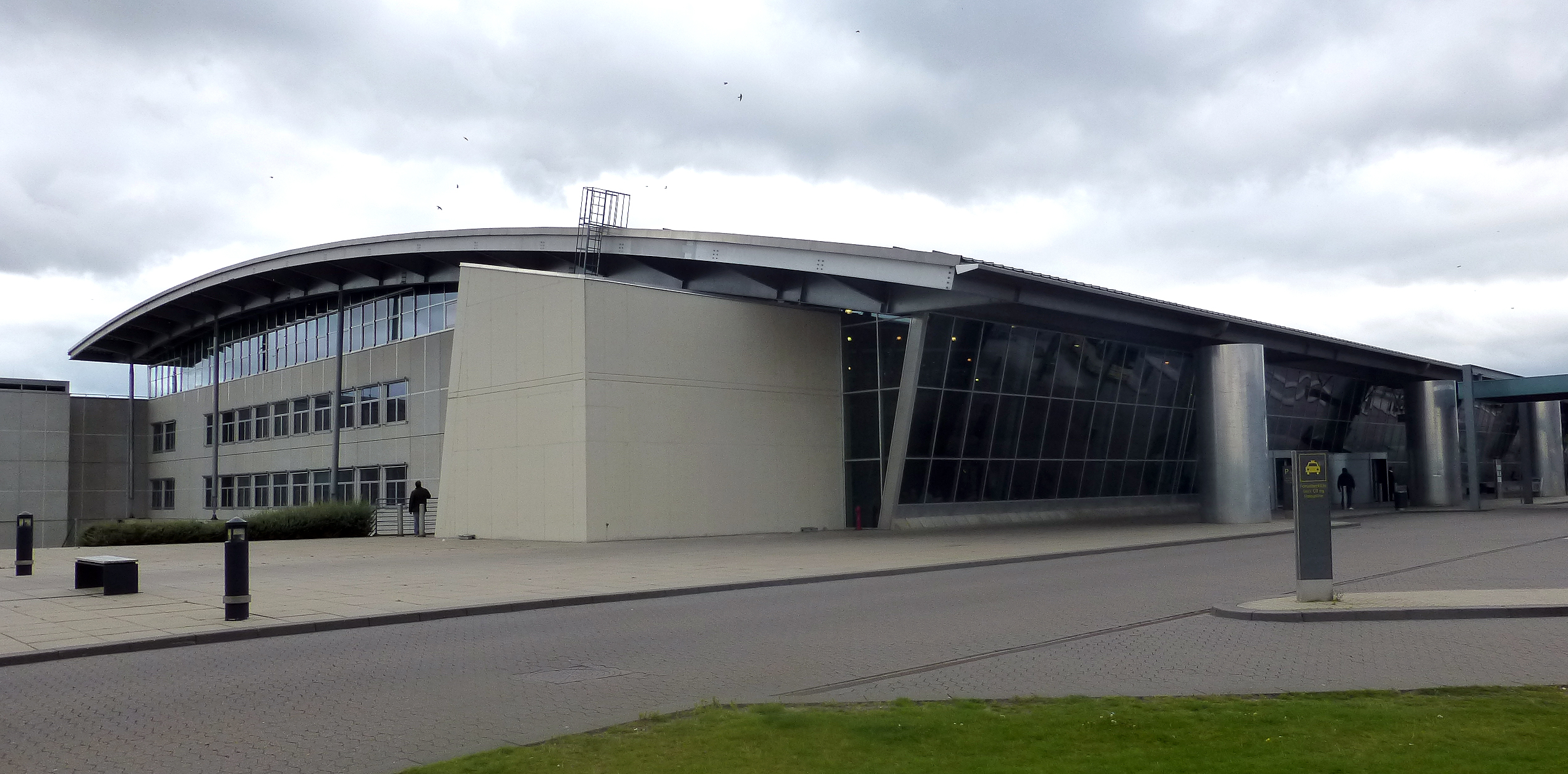
- IATA: BLL; ICAO: EKBI

Summary
- Airport type: Public
- Operator: Billund Lufthavn A/S
- Serves: Mid and Southern Denmark and Funen
- Location: Billund Municipality, Denmark
- Opened: 1 November 1964
- Hub for: Maersk Air Cargo
- Elevation AMSL: 247 ft (75 m)
- Coordinates: 55°44′25″N 009°09′07″E
- Website: bll.dk

Map
- Location in Denmark

Runways
Direction	Length		Surface
Direction	m	ft	Surface
09/27	3,100	10,172	Asphalt

Statistics (2019)
- Passengers: 3,739,267 ▲6.6%
- Source: AIP

Billund Airport (Danish: Billund Lufthavn) (IATA: BLL, ICAO: EKBI) is an international airport in Denmark. Located 1 nautical mile (1.9 km; 1.2 mi) northeast of Billund, it serves as one of the country's busiest air cargo centres, as well as a charter airline destination. It is the 10th busiest airport in the Nordic countries.

== History ==
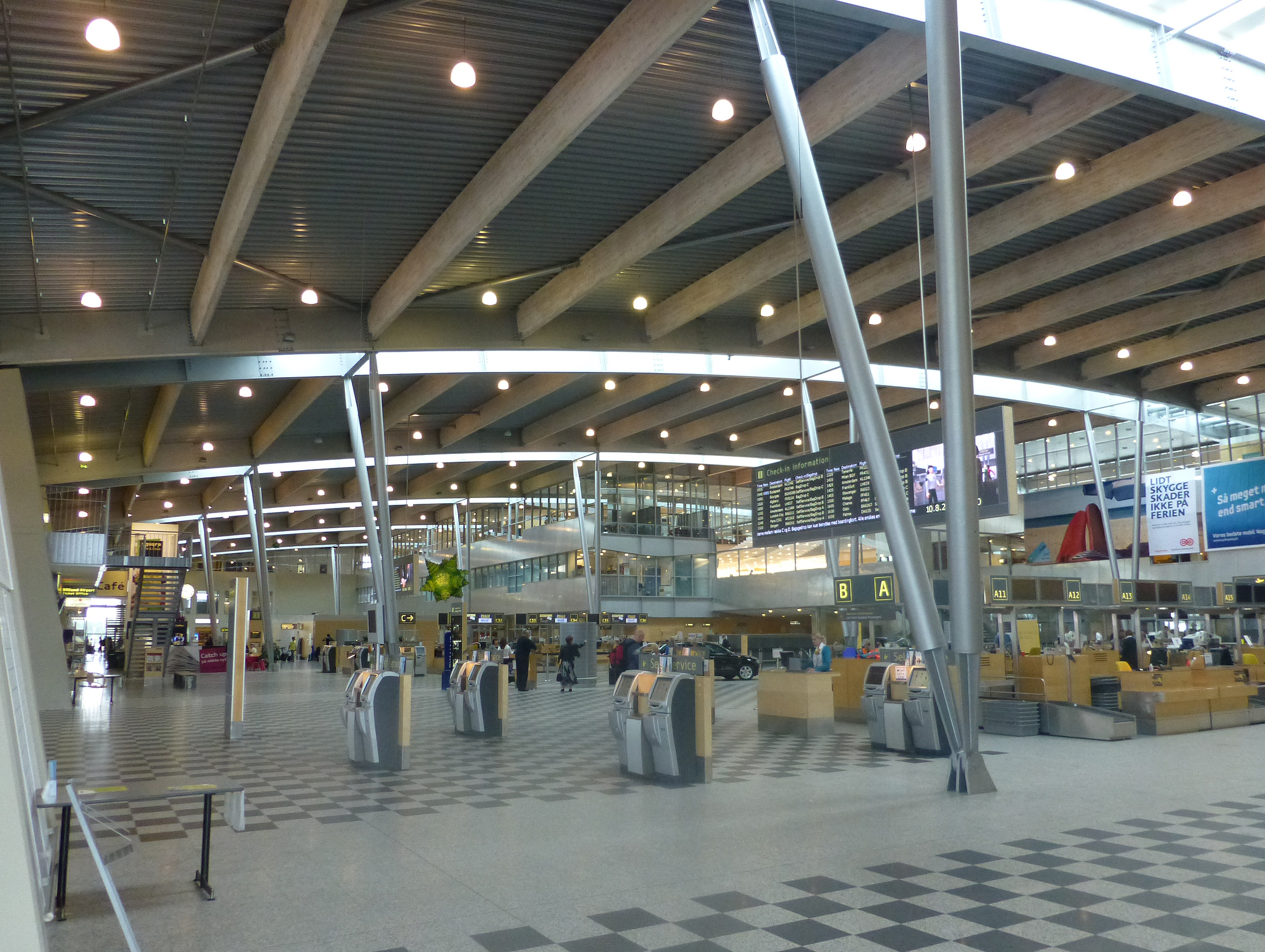
Check-in hall

=== Early years ===
Billund Airport had its beginning in 1961 when the son of the founder of the Lego Group, Godtfred Kirk Christiansen, established a private 800-meter long runway and hangar north of his factory in Billund. With Christiansen as a key driver, more of the neighbouring municipalities were included in the group of owners, and it was planned that the airport should be expanded to a regular public airport.

The construction of the new airport was carried out during 1964 and the airport opened on 1 November, with one runway at 1660 meters in length and 45 meters width, a small platform where aircraft could be served, and a control tower. Hans Erik Christensen, the former chief pilot at Lego, became director, and the passengers were handled in Lego's hangar until the first terminal building was opened in the spring of 1966. The airport was continuously expanded in the following years, with new facilities, terminal buildings, lounge, tax-free area, and hangars where LC Johansen's studio often participated as an architect (today called Johannsen Architects), while other work was carried out by the airport's own studio.

In 1997, they had an architectural competition for a new 430,000 ft^{2} (40,000 m^{2}) passenger terminal, designed to serve 3.5 million passengers a year, north of the original airport. KHR Architects won the assignment and completed the construction in co-operation with COWI, and at the end of May 2002 the new passenger terminal was put to use, as the first phase of the future expansion, which is scheduled to take place north of the start and runway, while air cargo services, business and private aviation will continue to be served from the existing buildings south of the runway. In connection with this expansion, the largest since the beginning of the airport, it was with effect from 1 January 1997 turned into a joint-stock company, Billund Airport A/S, with the former members Vejle County and municipalities Vejle, Kolding, Grindsted, Billund, and Give as shareholders.

=== Development since the 2000s ===
In 2014, Lego produced a limited Lego Architecture set of Billund Airport, which could only be bought in the departure hall's Lego store. In 2018, a new version of this set was released in limited quantities.

A new terminal was slated to open in the fall of 2019. It cost more than 100 million Danish kroner.

In late 2023, a theatre opened at the airport.

Billund Airport has experienced significant turnover in its scheduled international route network over several decades, with numerous routes launched by network, regional and low-cost carriers subsequently being reduced, suspended or discontinued.

The bankruptcy of Cimber Sterling on 3 May 2012 caused disruption to Billund Airport. The airport subsequently estimated that the collapse cost it approximately 300,000 passengers during 2012. In addition to temporarily leaving Billund without a domestic service to Copenhagen, the bankruptcy removed international connections including Oslo and Stockholm Arlanda, while several other Cimber Sterling routes had already been withdrawn before the collapse. Sun-Air subsequently moved to replace some of the lost regional capacity, including services to Oslo and Stockholm Bromma.

Sun-Air itself operated a substantial regional network from Billund Airport over several decades, primarily under its franchise agreement with British Airways. Earlier Sun-Air routes from Billund included services to destinations such as Cologne/Bonn, Birmingham, Nuremberg, Stuttgart and Kristiansund, while the airline also served destinations including Brussels, Düsseldorf, Helsinki, London City, Manchester and Paris–Charles de Gaulle. Several of these routes were later withdrawn as the airline's scheduled network gradually contracted.

The Billund–Brussels market in particular underwent repeated changes. Sun-Air operated flights between Billund and Brussels for a number of years before withdrawing, while Brussels Airlines later entered the route. Brussels Airlines subsequently suspended its Billund operation during the COVID-19 pandemic. Although the route was later reintroduced, the airline again suspended its Billund–Brussels service for 2024 because of aircraft capacity constraints.

Wizz Air also became an increasingly important operator at Billund Airport, but its network has repeatedly been expanded and reduced. During winter 2018, the airline suspended several Billund routes, including services to Gdańsk, Warsaw and Tuzla. The airline subsequently expanded substantially at Billund, but by the summer of 2023 its network had been reduced from 13 routes to four. The service between Billund and Tuzla was later discontinued following the closure of Wizz Air's base at Tuzla. Further Wizz Air network reductions followed as part of wider changes to the airline's European schedule.

The COVID-19 pandemic caused another major contraction in the airport's international network. Sun-Air suspended its scheduled operations from Billund Airport in March 2020. Its service to London City did not resume until September 2022, following an interruption of 906 days. The London City service eventually became Sun-Air's final scheduled passenger route.

Other network carriers also adjusted or withdrew their Billund operations in the years following the pandemic. Brussels Airlines returned to Billund Airport in 2023 but suspended its route to Brussels again for the 2024 season. Austrian Airlines also withdrew its Billund operation, reducing the number of Lufthansa Group airlines serving the airport.

The most significant recent contraction came in 2025. Ryanair announced the closure of its two-aircraft base at Billund Airport, with the base shutting at the end of the 2024–25 winter schedule in March 2025. The decision resulted in the withdrawal of a substantial part of the airline's Billund network and represented one of the largest single reductions in scheduled capacity at the airport in recent years. Billund Airport initially estimated that the Ryanair withdrawal could affect approximately 1.3 million annual passengers and around 25 routes.

At approximately the same time, Sun-Air ended scheduled passenger operations after around 35 years. Its final scheduled route between Billund and London City was discontinued in March 2025, with the airline citing structural changes in the business travel market and the reduced economic viability of scheduled regional operations.

The combined effect of the Ryanair withdrawal and other network reductions was reflected in Billund's traffic figures. Billund Airport handled approximately 3.06 million passengers in 2025, representing a decline of around 22 percent compared with the previous year.

Despite these repeated route closures, Billund Airport has also repeatedly replaced lost capacity through new airlines, additional frequencies and reopened routes. Its route history has therefore been characterised by alternating periods of substantial network expansion and contraction, with particularly significant reductions occurring around 2011–2012, during the COVID-19 pandemic and again in 2024–2025.

== Corporate affairs ==
In 2007, Vejle County was abolished after a municipality reform. Its 50% shareholding was then distributed among municipalities in the county leading to the following ownership:

Ownership distribution of Billund Airport
Owner	Percentage of shares
Vejle municipality	34.3%
Kolding municipality	25.9%
Billund municipality	15%
Horsens municipality	10.7%
Fredericia municipality	6.9%
Hedensted municipality	6.1%
Ikast-Brande municipality	1%
Billund Airport	0.1%

== Capabilities ==
The airport handles an average of more than three million passengers a year, and millions of pounds of cargo. The airport's main runway can handle airliners as large as the Boeing 747, although most passengers arrive on smaller aeroplanes, such as ATR-72s, Boeing 737s and Airbus A320s. Boeing 747 activity at this airport is almost exclusively limited to cargo flights.

== Airlines and destinations ==
=== Passenger ===
The following airlines operate regular scheduled and charter flights to and from Billund:

Airlines	Destinations
Air France	Paris–Charles de Gaulle
airBaltic	Riga
Atlantic Airways	Vágar; Seasonal charter: Ioannina
British Airways	London–Heathrow
DAT	Seasonal: Bornholm
Finnair	Seasonal: Helsinki
Icelandair	Seasonal: Reykjavik–Keflavík
KLM	Amsterdam
LOT Polish Airlines	Warsaw–Chopin
Lufthansa	Frankfurt
Norwegian Air Shuttle	Alicante, London–Gatwick, Málaga, Oslo; Seasonal: Barcelona, Bergamo, Chania, Edinburgh, Malta, Manchester (begins 1 April 2027), Naples, Nice, Palma de Mallorca, Porto, Rome–Fiumicino
Pegasus Airlines	Antalya
Scandinavian Airlines	Copenhagen, Oslo, Stockholm–Arlanda
SkyAlps	Seasonal: Bolzano
SunExpress	Seasonal: Antalya
TUI fly Belgium	Brussels (begins 27 March 2027)
Widerøe	Seasonal: Bergen
Wizz Air	Bucharest–Otopeni, Budapest, Gdańsk, Iași, Katowice, Tirana

=== Cargo ===
Airlines	Destinations
DHL Aviation	Leipzig/Halle
Maersk Air Cargo	Ezhou, Hangzhou
Turkish Cargo	Istanbul

== Ground transport ==
The road distance is to Billund 3 kilometres (2 mi), to Vejle 28 kilometres (17 mi), to Kolding 41 kilometres (25 mi), to Esbjerg 61 kilometres (38 mi) and to Aarhus 98 kilometres (61 mi). There are airport buses to Horsens, Skanderborg and Aarhus as well as Vejle, Give, Kolding, and Esbjerg.

== See also ==
- List of the busiest airports in the Nordic countries
