= Sønder Omme =

- Town
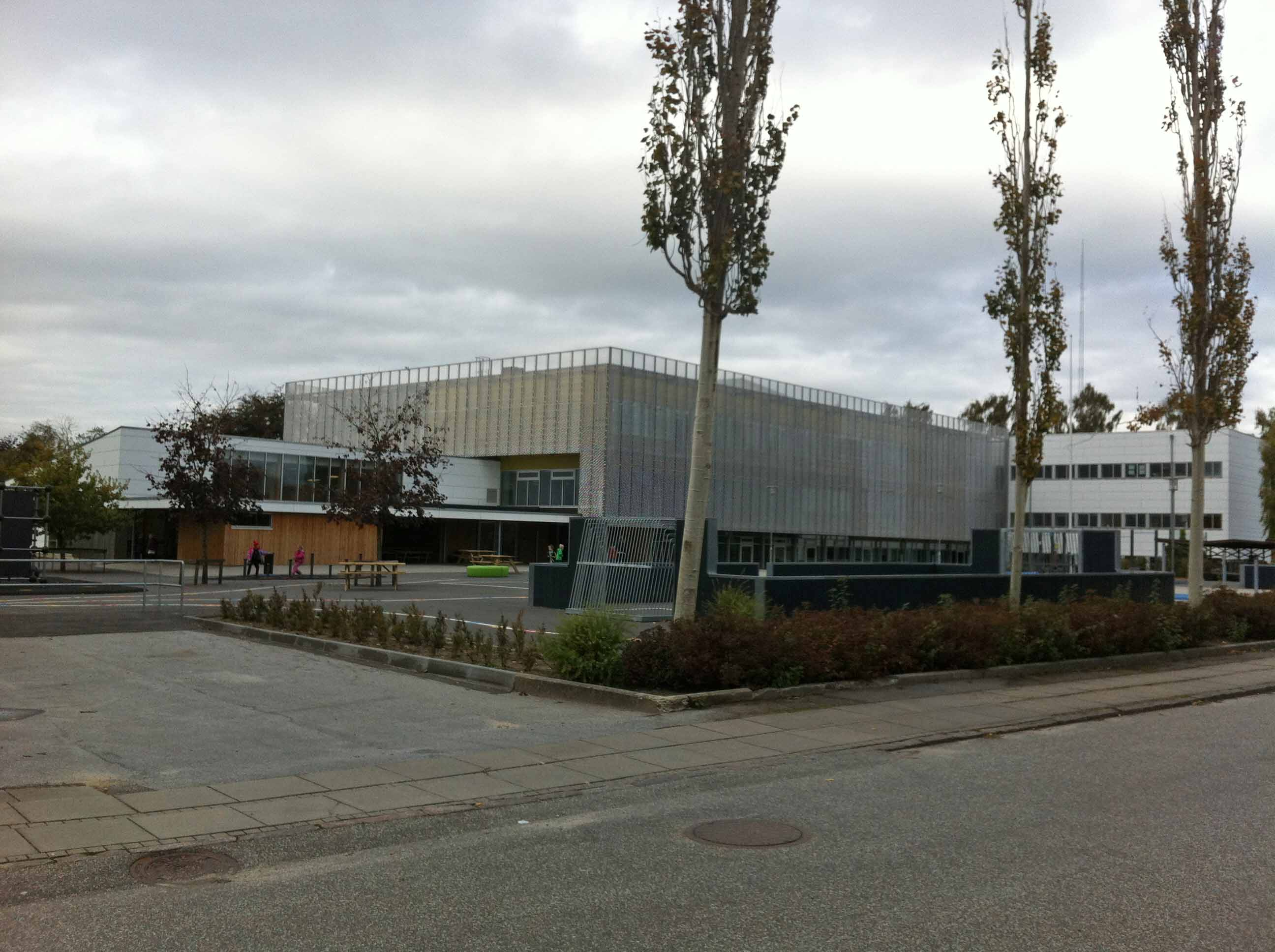
- Sønder Omme school

- Location in Denmark Sønder Omme (Region of Southern Denmark)
- Coordinates: 55.83714°N 8.89266°E
- Country: Denmark
- Region: Region of Southern Denmark (Syddanmark)
- Municipality: Billund

Area
  - Urban: 1.4 km^{2} (0.54 sq mi)

Population (2026)
  - Urban: 1,699
  - Urban density: 1,200/km^{2} (3,100/sq mi)
- Time zone: UTC+1 (CET)
  - Summer (DST): UTC+2 (CEST)
- Postal code: DK-7200 Sønder Omme

Sønder Omme often abbreviated to Sdr. Omme, is a town in Billund Municipality, Southern Denmark. It is located 10 km north of the municipal seat Grindsted.

As of 1 January 2026 the population of Sønder Omme was 1,699, making it the third largest town in Billund Municipality.

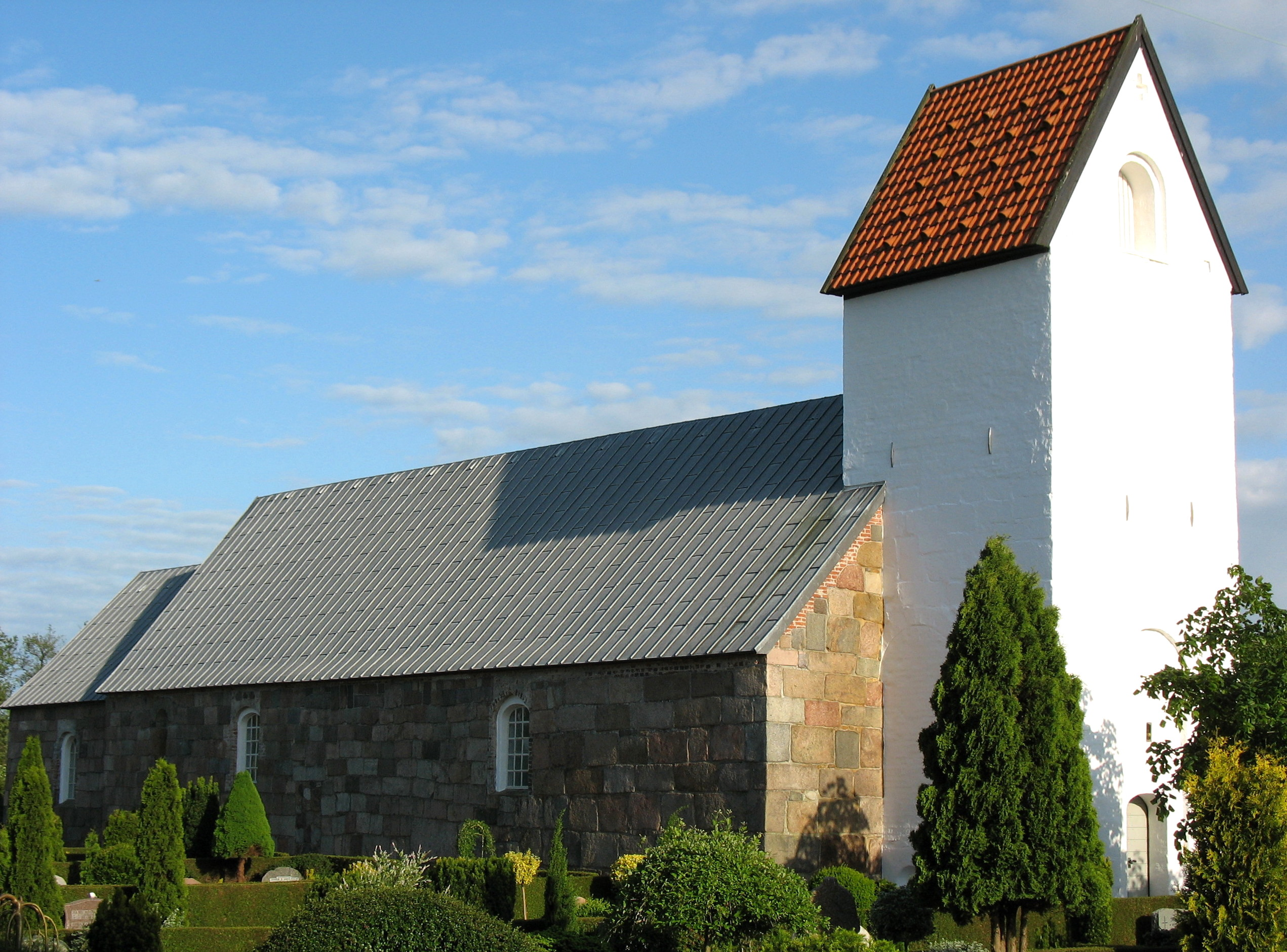
Sønder Omme Church

Sønder Omme Church was built in the Romanesque period of granit ashlar on granite foundations, and consists of a chancel and nave. The nave was extended in granite ashlar around the time of the Reformation.

Sdr. Omme Kro (Sdr. Omme Inn)

Sdr. Omme Kro (Sdr. Omme Inn) is a historical roadside inn located at the main street in the centre of the town.

Sdr. Omme State Prison is located 2 km southeast of the town.

== Notable people ==
- Morten Kirkskov (born 1963), actor.
