= Billund Municipality =

Billund Municipality Billund Kommune (Danish)
- Municipality
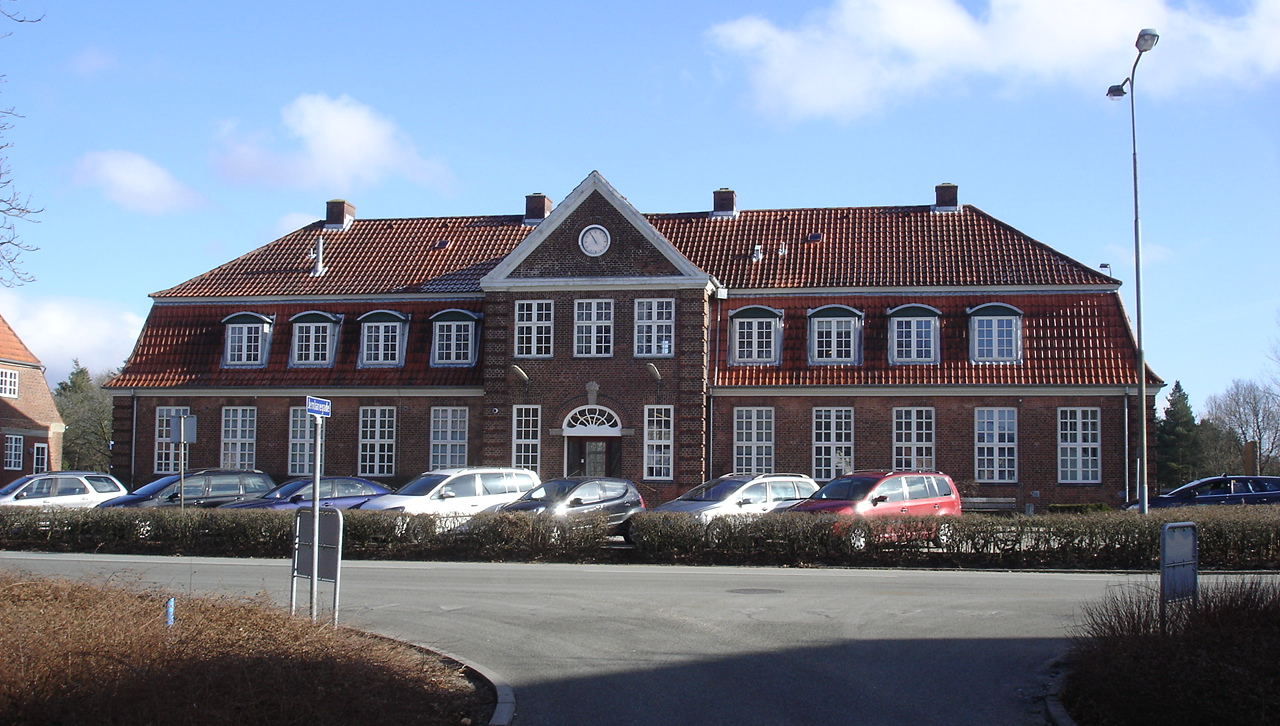
- Grindsted train station in the largest town of the municipality

- Coat of arms

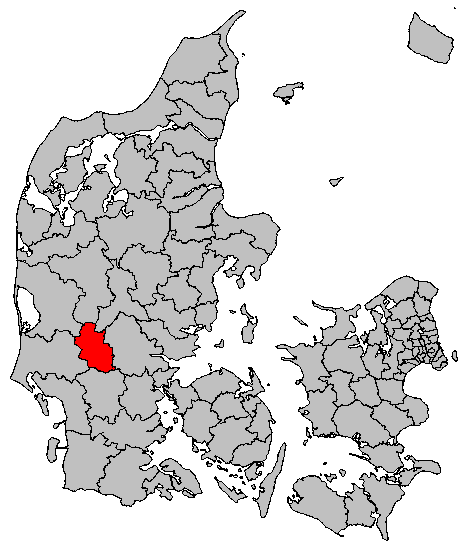
- Location in Denmark
- Coordinates: 55°43′55″N 8°57′22″E
- Country: Denmark
- Region: Southern Denmark
- Established: 1 January 2007

Government
  - Mayor: Stephanie Storbank

Area
  - Total: 536.51 km^{2} (207.15 sq mi)

Population (1 January 2026)
  - Total: 27,200
  - Density: 50.7/km^{2} (131/sq mi)
- Time zone: UTC+1 (CET)
  - Summer (DST): UTC+2 (CEST)
- Postal code: 7200
- Website: billund.dk

Church of Denmark parishes in the municipality. Not numbered: Lindeballe and Ringive parishes, where the eastern part of Billund Airport is located.

Billund Municipality (Danish: Billund Kommune) is a kommune in the centre of the Jutland Peninsula in Denmark. Formerly the municipality belonged to Ribe County, now part of the Region of Southern Denmark since 2007. The new, merged municipality covers an area of 540.18 km^{2}, and has a total population of 27,200 (2026). Its mayor is Stephanie Storbank, a member of Venstre (Liberal Party) political party. The site of its municipal council is the town of Grindsted, which is the largest town in the municipality followed by the city of Billund.

On 1 January 2007, as a result of Kommunalreformen ("The Municipal Reform" of 2007), approved by the lawmakers in Folketinget 16 June 2005, and, after the signature by the head of state, published in Lovtidende, and being in effect from 26 June 2005, the new municipality was formed. The old Billund municipality was combined with the former Grindsted Municipality and the eastern part of Billund Airport that was located in Give Municipality, with this area forming parts of Church of Denmark Lindeballe, and Ringive parishes. The first election to the municipal council in the new municipality (and the regional council in the new region) was held 15 November 2005, which was the regular date of elections once every four years.

The municipality is part of the Triangle Region and of the East Jutland metropolitan area, which had a total population of 1.378 million in 2016.

== Locations ==
Cities and villages in Billund Municipality
Name	Population (2024)
Grindsted	9,745
Billund	7,307
Sønder Omme	1,710
Vorbasse	1,261
Hejnsvig	1,003
Filskov	706
Stenderup	642

== Politics ==
Billund's municipal council consists of 25 members, elected every four years. The municipal council has five political committees.

=== Municipal council ===
Below are the municipal councils elected since the Municipal Reform of 2007.

Election	Party								Total seats	Turnout	Elected mayor
Election	A	B	C	E	F	L	O	V	Total seats	Turnout	Elected mayor
2005	7		3				1	14	25	71.1%	Ib Kristensen (V)
2009	6	1	3		3		2	10	25	67.7%	Ib Kristensen (V)
2013	7		2	1			2	13	25	74.1%	Ib Kristensen (V)
2017	7	2	1	2			3	10	25	72.8%	Ib Kristensen (V)
2021	9		3			1	2	10	25	68.3%	Stephanie Storbank (V)
Data from Kmdvalg.dk 2005, 2009, 2013, 2017 and 2021

== Economy ==
LEGO Group and Sun Air of Scandinavia have their head offices in Billund, Billund Municipality. The first Legoland has operated here since 1968.

== Twin towns – sister cities ==
Billund is twinned with:

- Hohenwestedt, Germany

== Sources ==
- Municipal mergers and neighbors: Eniro new municipalities map
- Billund and western Denmark
- Nuha Ansari, John D. Rambow, Denmark: The Guide for All Budgets, Rambow, 2002, Fodor's Denmark, 224 pages ISBN 0-676-90201-4
- Hogan, C.Michael, Egtved Girl Barrow, The Megalithic Portal, editor A. Burnham 4 October, 2007
