= Vorbasse =

- Town
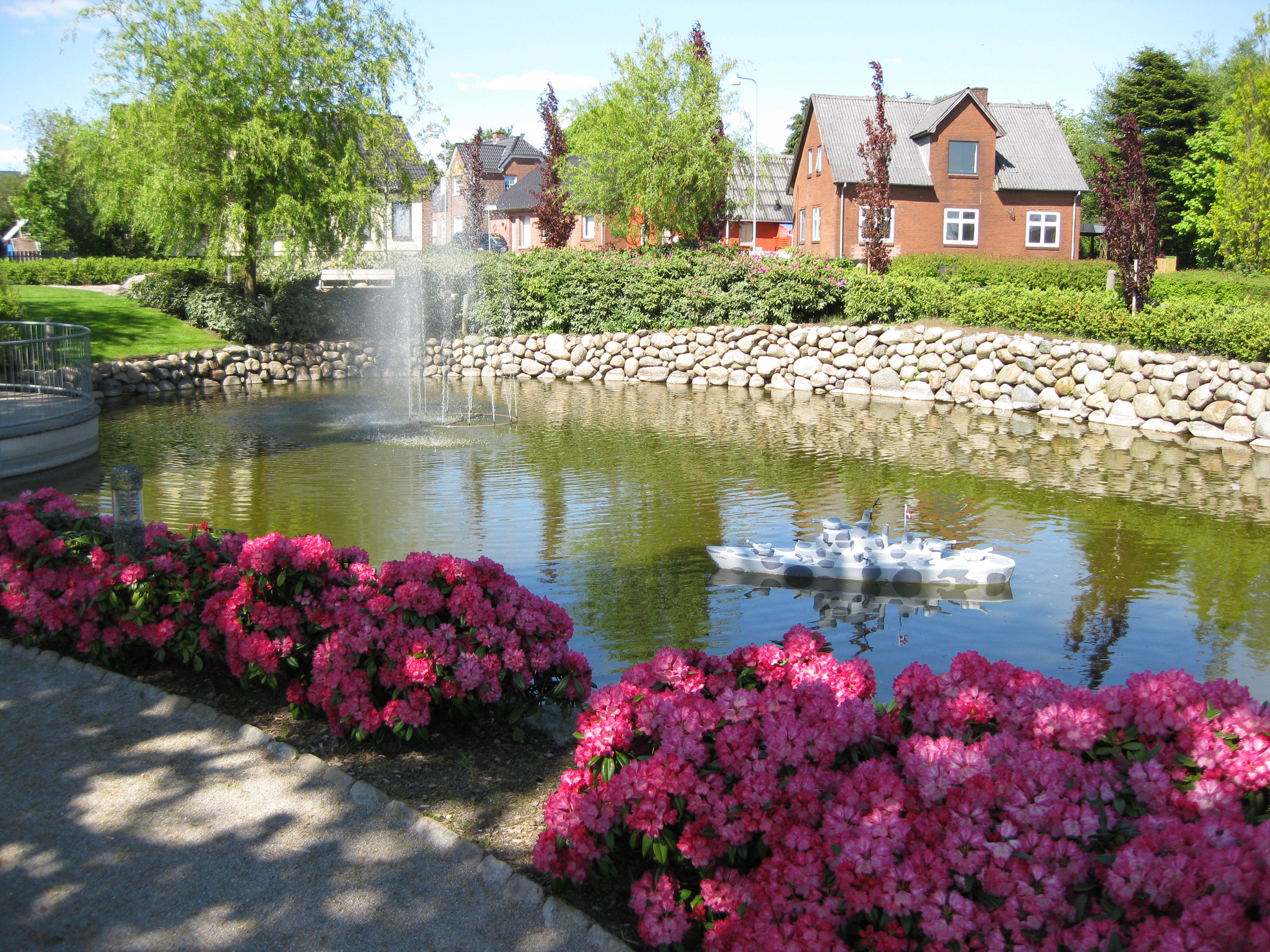
- Vorbasse Krigshavn

- Location in Region of Southern Denmark Vorbasse (Denmark)
- Coordinates: 55.63014°N 9.08063°E
- Country: Denmark
- Region: Southern Denmark (Syddanmark)
- Municipality: Billund Municipality

Area
  - Urban: 1.4 km^{2} (0.54 sq mi)

Population (2026)
  - Urban: 1,275
  - Urban density: 910/km^{2} (2,400/sq mi)
- Time zone: UTC+1 (CET)
  - Summer (DST): UTC+2 (CEST)
- Postal code: DK-6623 Vorbasse
- Website: www.vorbasse.dk

Vorbasse with a population of 1,275 (1 January 2026) is the 4th largest town in Billund Municipality, Region of Southern Denmark, Denmark.

The Vorbasse Market is the largest market in Denmark and has been running annually since 1730, with approximately 250,000 visitors. The town is also renowned for having its own little naval port, Vorbasse Krigshavn, actually a village pond dominated by the bridge of a former Russian submarine from 1988 until its removal during the 2003 renovation. It still harbours the model warship 'Labri', which is ceremonially launched every Easter.

In archaeology Vorbasse is well known for its large scale excavations of a settlement that had existed from the 1st century BC to the 11th century AD. The original settlement is located northeast of the modern town. The settlement consisted of a number of identical farms spread along a central street. The farm buildings, each set within its own large enclosure, contained a long house with generally sloping stone walls built without mortar and several smaller surrounding annexes. The roof of the long house tended to be curved with the centre being higher than the ends.

== Notable people ==
- Henrik Dam Kristensen (born 1957 in Vorbasse) a Danish politician and the current speaker of the Danish parliament
