= Grindsted =

- Town and municipal seat
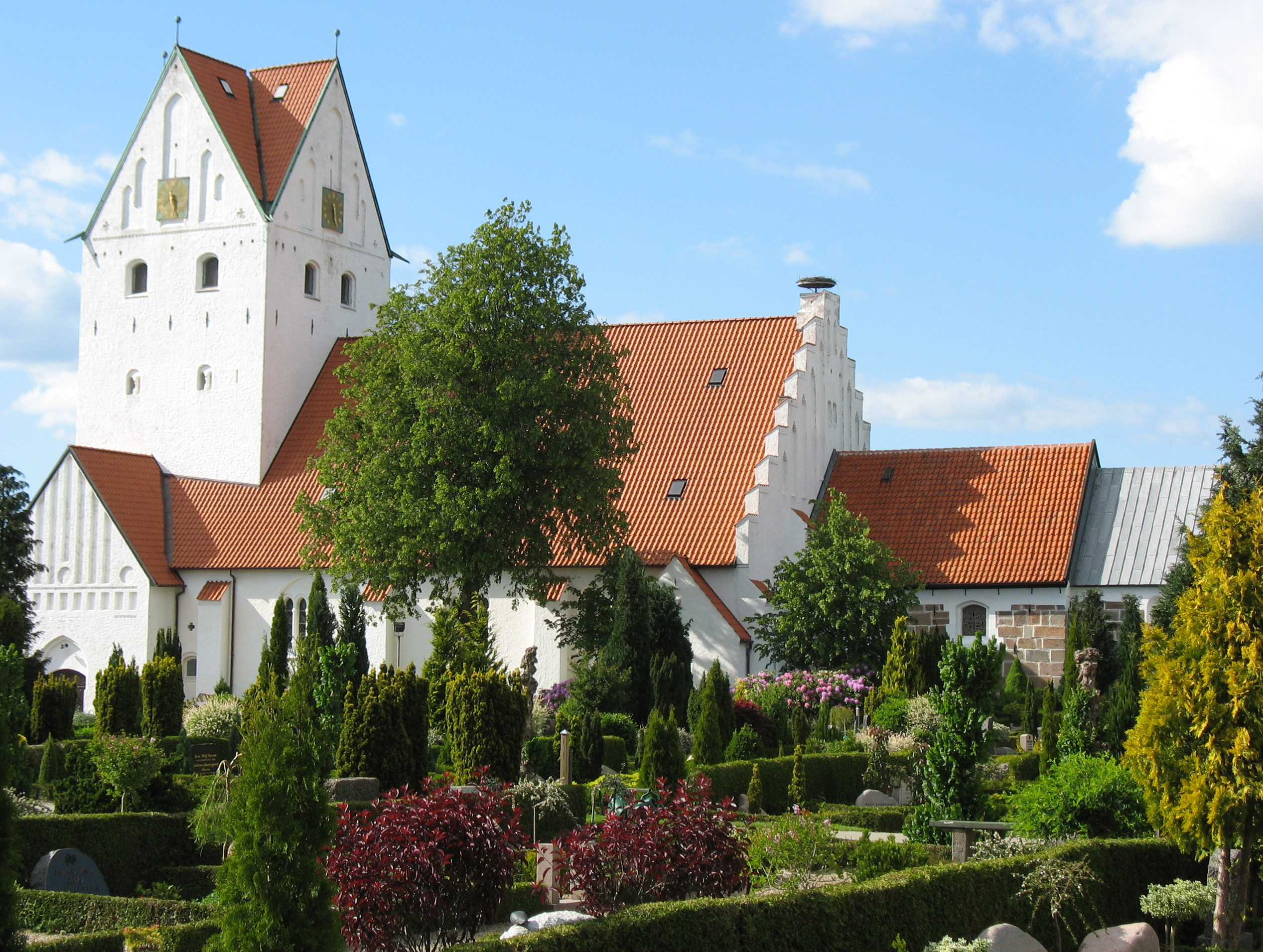
- Grinsted Church, which dates to the 12th century

- Location within Denmark Location within Region of Southern Denmark
- Coordinates: 55.75819°N 8.92617°E
- Country: Denmark
- Region: Region of Southern Denmark (Syddanmark)
- Municipality: Billund
- Founded: 14th century

Government
  - Mayor: Stephanie Storbank (Venstre)

Area
  - Urban: 8.5 km^{2} (3.3 sq mi)

Population (2026)
  - Urban: 9,789
  - Urban density: 1,200/km^{2} (3,000/sq mi)
  - Gender: 4,891 males and 4,898 females
- Postal code: DK-7200 Grindsted

Grindsted, with a population of 9,789 (1 January 2026), is the municipal seat and largest town of Billund Municipality, Denmark and belongs to the Region of Southern Denmark. It is located 42 km west of the major regional city of Vejle and 49 km northeast of the major harbour city Esbjerg. The postal code is 7200.

== History ==
Grindsted is first mentioned in the 14th century, and for several centuries was just a village on the heath. Until the middle of the 19th century, Grindsted was a small, remote, distinctly moorland village. The construction of the main road Vejle — Grindsted — Varde in 1864 brought some progress, which was increased by the later significant cultural works in the area, but it was not until the many railway installations during the First World War that caused the strong development which made Grindsted an important railway hub.

== Education ==
Grindsted has both private and public primary schools, upper secondary education and vocational education.

== Industry ==
In 1924, the chemical factory Grindstedværket was built in the city, and the industrial community gradually grew up, so that both the cement and textile industries came to the city. One of the main industries today is the DuPont factory, which traces its roots back to the original chemical factory named Grindstedværket (Grindsted Products) founded by the Lundsgaard brothers. Through acquisitions by De Danske Spritfabrikker, it became part of the Danisco corporation, but Danisco was acquired by DuPont in 2011; however, the factory only changed name on 14 May 2012. Products from Grindsted are still marketed under the Danisco logo and name.

== Sport ==
Grindsted Speedway Klub compete in the Danish Speedway League and the track called the Billund Municipality Stadium is located at Blåbjergvej 1, 7200.

The towns' handball club GGIF Grindsted secured promotion to the top division for the first time ever in 2024. They were relegated again 2 years later.

== Notable people ==
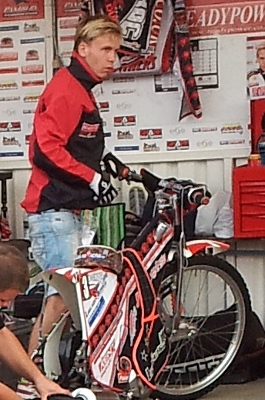
Michael Jepsen Jensen, 2012

- Ole Kirk Christiansen (1891 in Filskov, near Grindsted – 1958): a Danish carpenter; in 1932 he founded The Lego Group
- Hein Heinsen (born 1935 in Grindsted): a Danish artist who has contributed to the Lutheran art of Scandinavia
- Carsten Thomassen (born 1948 in Grindsted): a Danish mathematician
- Boye Habekost (born 1968 in Grindsted): a football coach and a former player with over 200 club caps
- Allan Gaarde (born 1975 in Grindsted): a former professional footballer, 299 club caps and 39 goals for AaB
- Kian Hansen (born 1989): Danish footballer, over 250 club caps, plays for FC Nordsjælland
- Michael Jepsen Jensen (born 1992 in Grindsted): a speedway rider

== Gallery ==
Grindsted Museum

Grindsted Realskole

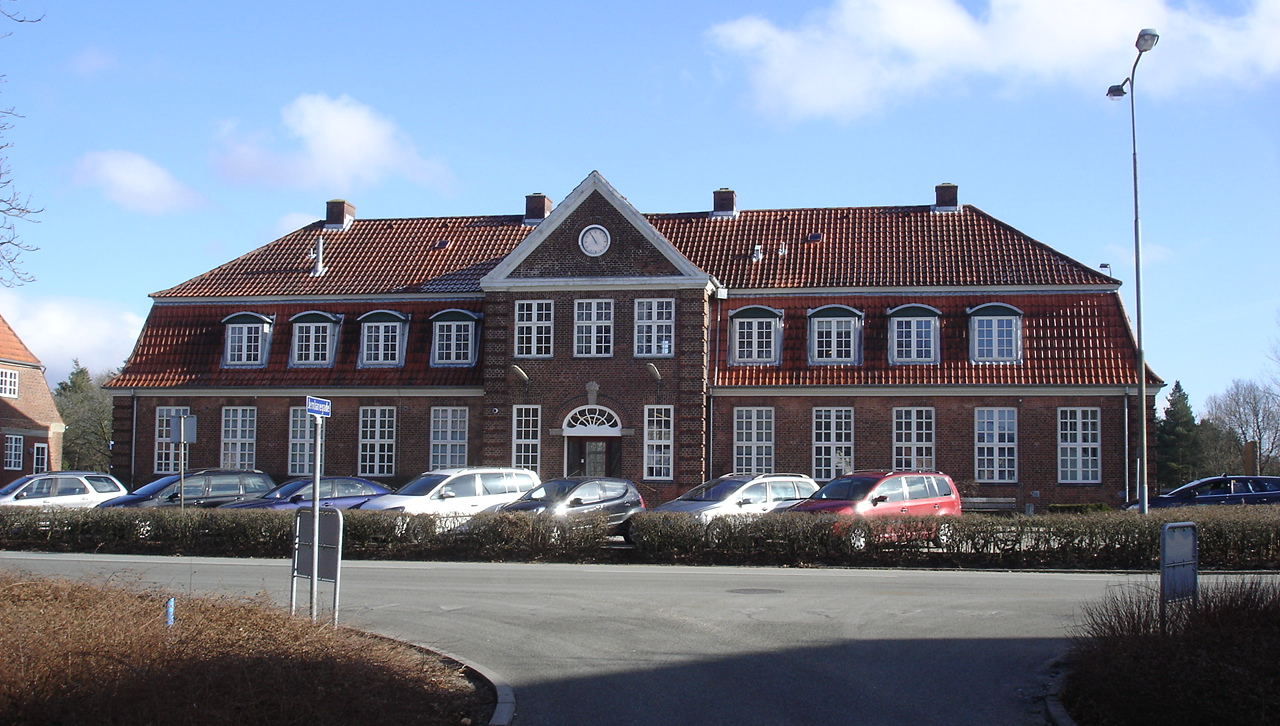
Grisdsted Railway Station

Grindsted water tower
