= List of Danes by net worth =

The following Forbes list of Danish billionaires is based on an annual assessment of wealth and assets compiled and published by Forbes magazine in 2024.

== 2024 Danish billionaires list ==
World rank	Name	Citizenship	Net worth (USD)	Source of wealth
159	Anders Holch Povlsen	Denmark	12.5 billion	Bestseller, Zalando, Asos
358	Niels Peter Louis-Hansen	Denmark	7.4 billion	Coloplast
424	Sofie Kirk Kristiansen	Denmark	6.5 billion	Lego
424	Thomas Kirk Kristiansen	Denmark	6.5 billion	Lego
424	Agnete Kirk Thinggaard	Denmark	6.5 billion	Lego
486	Kjeld Kirk Kristiansen (Note: Compared to lists from 2017 and earlier, his fortune was split into four equal parts: one for himself and one for each of his children, Sofie Kirk Kristiansen, Thomas Kirk Kristiansen and Agnete Kirk Thinggaard)	Denmark	6 billion	Lego
1380	Bent Jensen	Denmark	2.4 billion	Linak
2287	Benedicte Find	Denmark	1.3 billion	Coloplast
2287	Martin Møller Nielsen	Denmark	1.3 billion	Nordic Aviation Capital

== See also ==
- The World's Billionaires, annual Forbes list
- List of countries by the number of billionaires
- Danish weekly "Økonomisk Ugebrev" list of 100 richest Danes, November 2023 lists Danfoss (€10 bln.), Coloplast (€8 bln) and JYSK (€7 bln.) founders as among the ten richest Danes
