= Lego Foundation =

Danish foundation

The LEGO Foundation
- Founded: December 1986; 39 years ago
- Type: Foundation
- Location: Billund, Denmark
- Owner: Holds 25% ownership in the LEGO Group
- Key people: Thomas Kirk Kristiansen, Kjeld Kirk Kristiansen, Jørgen Vig Knudstorp
- Website: Legofoundation.com

The LEGO Foundation (LEGO Fonden) is a Danish foundation founded in December 1986 based in Billund. It is one of the country's ten largest charitable foundations. It owns 25% of the LEGO Group and has an equity of approximately 10 billion DKK.

Sidsel Marie Kristensen has been CEO of the LEGO Foundation since February 2023.

== Relationship with the LEGO Group ==
While legally independent, the LEGO Foundation is closely aligned with the LEGO Group and benefits from its brand reputation, expertise, and global reach. The Foundation's work is part of the wider LEGO ecosystem, and it collaborates with the company on product design, community engagement, and educational initiatives.

== Funding and impact ==
The LEGO Foundation is one of the world's largest private funders of early childhood development and education. In 2020, it awarded €152 million in funding, including major grants for COVID-19 response, humanitarian assistance, and global education programs. Around 7% of its funding that year went to universities, including Harvard, MIT, Cambridge, Oxford, and University of Copenhagen.

== See also ==
- Kirkbi
