= The Lego Story =

2012 film by Kim Pagel

- Directed by: Kim Pagel
- Written by: Ania de Sá Madsen; Helene Schjøtt; Kim Ace Nielsen
- Produced by: Kim Pagel; Thomas Pagel
- Edited by: Jimmi Johansen
- Music by: Andrew McKenna
- Production company: Lani Pixels
- Distributed by: YouTube
- Release date: August 13, 2012
- Running time: 17 minutes
- Country: Denmark
- Language: English

The Lego Story is a 2012 Danish animated short film directed by Kim Pagel. The 17-minute animation was produced by Kim Pagel and the Lego Group to celebrate its 80th anniversary.

== Plot ==
The short film is first set in Denmark and explores the origin and history of Lego through the experiences of the Kirk Kristiansen family. This includes Ole Kirk Christiansen, Godtfred Kirk Christiansen and Kjeld Kirk Kristiansen. They all took significant roles in changing and shaping the Danish Lego company to be what it is today. The short film conveys the significance of family, inspiring and supporting one another during tribulations and adversity. The company of Lego was founded by Ole Kirk Christiansen and his son Godtfred back in 1932. The word "Lego" derives from two Danish words, "leg godt", which translates to "play well" and in Latin translates to "I put together". The product of Lego was very different from what it is today. In the short film, the company started out making wooden toys in 1932. It was during this time Godtfred saved time and money by putting less work into making the toys. Ole Kirk Christiansen was not impressed and was in fact disappointed. Ole Kirk Christiansen got his son Godtfred to work on the toys again. That day they learnt an important lesson that the high quality of the toys and honesty of the customers were important. This led to the central idea that "Only the best is good enough". It was in 1946 when the plastic block was introduced which was later iterated and improved during the mid-1950s to become the modern Lego brick. This was also around the time the company introduced the Lego system.

== Voice cast ==
- Marc Graue as Kjeld Kirk Kristiansen, the grandson of Lego founder Ole Kirk Christiansen and third president of The LEGO Group who narrates the story.
  - Graue also voices a wholesaler.
- Mike Lane as Ole Kirk Christiansen, a carpenter and the founder of The LEGO Group.
- Matt Nolan as Godtfred Kirk Christiansen, the son of Lego founder Ole Kirk Christiansen and second president of The LEGO Group.
  - Alex Dean voices Godtfred as a child.
  - Nolan also provides the voices of a journeyman and a grocer.
- Jen Davis as Edith Nørregaard Knudsen, Godtfred Kirk Christiansen's wife.
  - Davis also voices Kjeld Kirk Kristiansen as a child and Hansine Kirstine Sörensen, Ole's wife.
- David Lodge voices a purchasing manager.

== Production ==
The production costs of the film were between DKK 5 and 10 million (Danish Krone) which approximately equaled to $0.85 and $1.7 million. Kjeld Kirk Kristiansen himself had involvement in the production for one year.

== Release and reception ==
Released in 2012, The LEGO Story won the Gold Award for animation at the Cannes Media and Television Awards.
