= BrainPop =

Educational video site

- Logo used since July 26, 2020
- Genre: Educational animation
- Founded: December 31, 1999; 26 years ago
- Founder: Avraham Kadar, M.D.
- Headquarters: New York City, U.S.
- Products: BrainPop, BrainPop Jr., BrainPop ELL, BrainPop Educators, BrainPop Español and BrainPop Français
- Owner: Kirkbi
- Website: www.brainpop.com

BrainPop (stylized as BrainPOP) is a group of educational websites founded in 1999 by Avraham Kadar and Chanan Kadmon, based in New York City. As of 2024, the websites host more than 1,000 short animated movies for students in grades K–8 (ages 5 to 14), together with quizzes and related materials, covering the subjects of science, social studies, English, math, engineering and technology, health, arts and music. In 2022, Kirkbi A/S, the private investment and holding company that owns a controlling stake in The Lego Group, acquired BrainPop.

BrainPop is used in schools and by homeschoolers in the U.S. and several other countries, where it offers videos in local languages that are designed for students in those countries. The site is available by subscription but has some free content, including a movie of the day, several movies from each topic area, educators' materials and games. Its content can also be accessed using its smartphone and tablet applications.

Most of the videos feature the characters Tim and Moby. The videos and other materials are aligned to state education standards and designed to engage students and assist teachers and homeschoolers. In addition to BrainPop.com for older children, the company offers BrainPop Jr. for younger children (grades K-3); BrainPop Español; BrainPop Français; BrainPop ELL for non-native speakers learning English; BrainPop Educators, a free site for teachers and parents to post materials like lesson plans and interact with BrainPop and each other; GameUp, a library of educational games; and My BrainPop, a tool for students and teachers to record learning accomplishments.

== Description of the site ==
=== Company history ===
Logo used from the website's launch until 2020

BrainPop.com LLC was founded in 1999 by Avraham Kadar, an immunologist and pediatrician, to explain medical concepts to his young patients using animation, and co-founded by Chanan Kadmon, who served as the company's president, acting CEO and an executive producer, leaving BrainPop in 2003. In 2009, Kadar reorganized the company as BrainPOP LLC. The BrainPop websites display animated, curriculum-based content that supports educators, and are intended to be fun and motivational for students to watch. The sites' movies cover the subjects of science, social studies, English, mathematics, engineering and technology, health, as well as arts and music. The sites also access educational games. As of 2022, BrainPop is used in two thirds of U.S. school districts and in many schools outside the U.S., as well as by parents, homeschoolers and others. Kadar served as CEO from BrainPop's founding until 2019, when Scott Kirkpatrick was named CEO. As of 2011, BrainPop hosted more than 11 million unique visits each month. BrainPop uses an in-house team of educators, animators and writers to produce and continually update the sites, incorporating teacher and parent input.

The site's resources include BrainPop.com, for grades 3–8 and up (ages 9 and up) and BrainPop Jr., for grades K-3 (ages 5 to 9). The sites also offer movies in several languages for regional markets aligned to local educational standards. The site's interactive resource for teachers and homeschoolers, BrainPop Educators, features tips, tools and best practices by and for educators. My BrainPop is a tool for students and teachers to record learning accomplishments, and teachers can track students' progress. In 2009, BrainPop introduced BrainPop ELL (originally called BrainPop ESL), targeted at students learning English as a second language. Schools and parents can use the site to help shape the student's curriculum. BrainPop's free GameUp website contains online games from third-party game publishers that coordinate with the BrainPop, BrainPop Jr. and BrainPop ELL curricula.

BrainPop movies may be used to introduce a new lesson or topic, to illustrate complex subject matter concisely, or for review before a test. Content is aligned to USA state education standards and is searchable by topic or state standard. In addition to movies, the site displays quizzes, educational games, experiments and other related content that students can use interactively to reinforce the lessons in the movies. BrainPop products are compatible with PCs, Macs, projectors and interactive whiteboards, as well as applications for tablets and smart phones. No downloading, installation or special hardware is required. The movies feature recurring characters such as the robot Moby, Tim (a teenager, at BrainPop) and Annie (a younger girl, at BrainPop Jr.). Most of the movies begin with the characters responding to correspondence and end humorously, often with Tim getting annoyed at Moby or vice versa.

After the outbreak of the COVID-19 pandemic, BrainPOP offered free access to the site to affected families, teachers and schools. According to Kadar, traffic and subscriptions to its websites greatly increased.

On October 11, 2022, Kirkbi A/S, the private investment and holding company that owns a controlling stake in Lego, acquired BrainPop for $875 million. Kirkpatrick continued to act as BrainPOP's CEO, and Kadar remained on the board of directors; the same team continued to operate BrainPop independently. BrainPop was a nominee for a Shorty Award in 2025. In 2026, the Trump administration posted a video depicting the BrainPop characters Tim and Moby wearing MAGA hats and promoting the administration's efforts to dismantle the U.S. Department of Education; the post drew a Community Note on X stating that the administration's video is not a publication of BrainPop, which "creates non-partisan" animations "and prohibits unauthorized use of its characters". BrainPop responded to the video by posting a lesson with Tim and Moby introducing the topic of copyright.

=== Reputation ===
"BrainPOP has built a reputation for quality, thoughtfulness, and robust support for teachers". BrainPop and its products have earned numerous awards and recognition from Common Sense Media, Association of Educational Publishers, District Administration magazine, Forbes magazine, Association for Library Service to Children, Association of Educational Publishers, Digital Innovation in Learning Awards, Tech & Learning Magazine, the KAPi Awards, the CODiE Awards, Apps for Homeschooling, International Serious Play Awards, Learning Magazine, EdNet's Best, Teacher's Choice Awards, eSchool News, Homeschool.com, Apple Education, the Interactive Media Awards, Teachers With Apps and Distinguished Achievement Awards, Media & Methods. A 2009 multi-grade study by SEG research, entitled "A Study of the Effectiveness of BrainPop", involved over 1,000 students in schools in Palm Beach County, Florida and New York City. The BrainPop-financed study concluded, "Students in classes using BrainPop made significant improvements compared to students in classes not using BrainPop."

Reviews for the websites and movies have been favorable. A review in Common Sense Media commented: "BrainPOP is a standard-bearer for quality, self-directed online educational content. … A year's subscription is worth it because there's at least a year's worth of content for a kid to explore on BrainPOP." A homeschooler wrote in Curriculum Choice: "The videos are very funny, plus they explain information in a way that is easy for kids to understand and remember. … [The quizzes are] a quick and easy way for me to see whether [the students] really grasped the material." A review in The Reading Matrix stated:

These presentations provide meaningful, standard-driven instruction and assessment [due] to the exceptional quality. … One of the best features that teachers like about BrainPop is its ease of use. … [T]he layout, webinars, and free tutorials make navigating through the tremendous amount of information a cinch. … [A] State Standards Tool … allows educators to search their state standards in order to fit different activities with appropriate standards. … [The] interactive characters … help explain concepts, design experiments, and show students how to acquire a particular skill or use the information given. … Tim and Moby have personalities of their own and are relatable, trustworthy friends to their viewers. … [the] site allows students to teach themselves.

Schools recommend the product. A teacher wrote to eSchool News, "This product has made my students excited to take the quiz after the video. How many teachers can say that about their students?" Praising a BrainPop video about Ada Lovelace, Wired magazine wrote, "After reading more about her life and her work, I still feel it is best summarized by BrainPop's Ada Lovelace video, which is designed for kids." Another reviewer felt that a good feature of BrainPop's movies is their brevity: "just enough to capture and engage children." After budgetary cuts caused the cancellation of a Michigan school's subscription to BrainPop in 2014, teachers raised money from students to bring it back in 2015.

The educational site connexions.org wrote: "I recommend this site to teachers who want to inform and entertain their students. The videos are a unique educational tool with loveable [sic] characters. … BrainPop will not only enliven the classroom, but the site is dependable with lessons following state and grade-level standards." In 2011, Canada's Teach Magazine wrote that the movies are presented "in a fun format. … BrainPop movies can be used to introduce new lessons or topics or to illustrate complex themes". In 2015, Yahoo! Tech selected BrainPop for its list of "Eleven Great Digital Homework Helpers for Your Kids", and SheKnows Media listed it among its top educational sites for kids.

In 2010, The New York Times wrote of the company's free smartphone and tablet application: "BrainPop is a worthy app, featuring a new brief educational cartoon every day. The cartoon is followed by a quick quiz that will at times challenge even a grown-up." ChannelproSMB recommended BrainPop's phone and tablet application, as has Family Circle, Common Sense Media Cool mother Tech and The Educator's Room. ADDitude Magazine selected the app as one of three apps to "sharpen reading skills".

== BrainPop characters ==
Tim and Moby are the main characters in most BrainPop movies.

=== Tim ===
Tim is a teenager and does most of the talking in, and narrates, the movies. He understands what Moby says. The design on his shirt usually matches the topic being covered. At the beginning of each video, Tim reads a letter from someone asking about the topic. Often at the end of the movies, Moby will humorously annoy Tim, or vice versa.

=== Moby ===
Moby is an orange humanoid robot who communicates in beeping noises. The three lights on his chest light up when he beeps, and Tim typically translates what Moby says. Moby is Tim's friend but loves to annoy him. Moby helps out by fetching things for Tim and asking questions about the topic they are discussing. As a robot, Moby can do things that people are unable to do, such as changing his hand into a freeze-ray, sending himself back in time, removing his head and using lasers. Some of the movies, such as the Earth, Radar and Milky Way videos, imply that Moby is of an extraterrestrial origin. However, the Leonardo da Vinci movie implies that he was invented by Leonardo.

=== Other characters ===
Cassie and Rita are two teenage girls who are mainly featured in comics that accompany many of the movies in the "FYI" section. They also occasionally appear in the main movies and even narrate a few of them. Like Moby, Cassie enjoys annoying Tim, while some of the movies imply that Rita has a romantic interest in Tim and that he returns her feelings.

Bob is a rat with a broken tail and a patched chest. He is featured in, and often conducts, experiments called "Experiments with Bob the Ex-Lab Rat", which relate to mostly science movies.

Gary and gary are a father and son featured in comics called "How To With Gary and gary", which show how to do something safely. The capitalized "Gary" is the father, and the lowercase "gary" is the son.

== BrainPop Jr. ==
BrainPop Jr. was launched on September 4, 2006. It is similar to BrainPop in subject areas, but the movies are geared towards grades K-3 (age 5–9). The hosts are Moby and a little girl named Annie. Like the regular BrainPop, the site offers a free "Movie of the Week", as well as several free movies in the different curricular areas. Common Sense Media called "BrainPop Jr. "a high-quality educational site that kids can navigate easily on their own. This interactive site includes videos, audio prompts and graphics familiar to kids in an ideal format for young learners. Kids can take their enjoyment of videos to the next, more effective, level and do something with what they've just watched online … [and explore] sub-categories, like the science and math sections. If your K-3 child likes to learn things online, this site is worth the subscription fee." Common Sense Media also praised the free movies' video quality and topic variety, and writing, "The videos cover a lot of ground but are easy to follow and fun to watch; they'll explain things slowly and deliberately and at a level that's appropriate for young elementary school kids [but] it will be largely up to parents to get kids engaged in further exploration of the material."

=== Characters in BrainPop Jr. ===
Annie is a young girl who narrates the movies. She wears red framed glasses and also works with Moby. Annie has a teenage sister named Mia. Annie is implied to be Hispanic; her dog's name is Señor Maurice, and Annie sometimes refers to her father as "Papi".

Moby also appears as Annie's sidekick in BrainPop Jr.

== BrainPop Educators and BrainPop ELL ==
BrainPop Educators was introduced in 2008. It is an online community of 125,000 teachers, and parents who use BrainPop. This free site offers answer keys to activity pages, graphic organizers, professional development materials, posters, clipart and other resources for educators. It also allows educators to collaborate and share resources, such as lesson plans, organizers and activities for students. The site also offers video tutorials and webinars. My BrainPop, added in 2013, is a tool for students and teachers to record learning accomplishments from game play, activities, quizzes and other content.

BrainPop ELL (English as a second language) is a website launched in 2009 that displays animated videos providing grammar and vocabulary instruction and interactive exercises for non-native English speakers of all ages. Each video contains an animated story, an introduction to new vocabulary, and an illustration of relevant grammar topics. The narrator is a boy named Ben, who is accompanied by Moby the robot. The videos provide a series of increasingly challenging contextualized language and content exercises for English learners, starting with beginner levels and progressing to advanced levels. Students may select review activities, such as “Words, Words, Words”, a vocabulary exercise that uses flashcards and includes a pronunciation guide; "Hear it, Say it", to reinforce vocabulary and speaking; "Read it", for reading comprehension; and "Write it", for writing practice. There are also games and quizzes to review ideas from the videos. Internet-based websites have been shown to be useful tools to supplement in-class instruction for English language learners. Education Week recommends BrainPop ELL, writing that it "helps build background knowledge and concrete visual examples."

== GameUp ==
In 2011, BrainPop launched its educational games site, GameUp, which contains a collection of free online games from third-party game publishers and BrainPop's designers that help teach a variety of subjects and coordinate with the BrainPop, BrainPop Jr. and BrainPop ELL curricula. BrainPop partners with developer organizations and community developers to continually expand and improve the site's content and align the games with academic standards. More than 100 games were featured on the site by 2014 based on the Common Core State Standards Initiative. GameUp aims to help teachers use educational games in the classroom to engage and motivate students. It is supported by BrainPop Educators.

New Media Consortium wrote: "GameUp features top online educational gaming titles as well as support and supplementary materials to educators. GameUp titles come from an impressive collection of organizations such as Nobelprize.org, iCivics, JASON Project, Mangahigh, and National Council of Teachers of Mathematics, to name a few." Edutopia, Education Week and The Wall Street Journal are among other sources that recommend GameUp. BrainPop "curates their games very carefully and considers a wide range of factors, from a game's curricular value to the length of experience appropriate for classroom use, and thoughtfully pairs games with supplemental lessons and materials that allow teachers to quickly and easily integrate the games into their classrooms."

== See also ==
- Educational animation
