= Padda (disambiguation) =

Padda is a genus of finches from Indonesia

Padda can also refer to:

== Places ==
- Padda, Kapurthala, a village in India
- Padda Island in Antarctica

== People ==
- Jaimal Singh Padda, an Indian poet and communist activist
- Bali Padda, a British businessman
- Aneet Padda, an Indian actress
