= Sofie Kirk Kristiansen =

Danish billionaire businesswoman

- Born: 18 November 1976 (age 49); Billund, Denmark
- Education: Aarhus University
- Parent: Kjeld Kirk Kristiansen

Sofie Kirk Kristiansen (born 18 November 1976) is a Danish fourth-generation owner of the Lego Group. Together with her father Kjeld, sister Agnete and brother Thomas, they split ownership of a 75% stake in the company.

Sofie Kirk Kristiansen holds a B.A. degree from the department of ethnography at the Aarhus University. She is the daughter of former Lego CEOs Kjeld Kirk Kristiansen, granddaughter of Godtfred Kirk Christiansen, and great-granddaughter of the company founder Ole Kirk Christiansen. As of 2022, the family is considered to be the richest family in Denmark, with an estimated $32.8 billion of Denmark’s $57 billion total billionaire wealth.

Sofie Kristiansen owns a large hunting lodge between Holsted and Hovborg in South Jutland. Kristiansen owns the Strathconon Estate, in the Highlands of Scotland, which was purchased by her father in 1995. She expanded this in 2025, by purchasing another 3,525 hectares of land, part of the neighbouring Scatwell Estate.

Sofie Kristiansen was married to Christopher Kiær Thomsen, but the couple divorced in 2014.

Sofie Kristiansen made the 2022 Forbes Billionaires List with an estimated wealth of $8.2 billion and occupied the 267th position.
