= Megamall =

Megamall, Mega Mall, or Mega mall may refer to:

- A very large shopping mall worldwide, in Asia Pacific defined as one with over 1.5 million sq. ft. of net leasable area

== Shopping centers with "mega" in the name ==
- MEGA Family Shopping Centre, a chain of shopping centers anchored by IKEA stores, across Russia
- MEGA Alma-Ata, Almaty, Kazakhstan
- Mega Mall (Bucharest), Romania
- Mega Mall (Sofia), Bulgaria
- Mid Valley Megamall, Kuala Lumpur, Malaysia
- SM Megamall, Manila, Philippines

== Other large shopping centers ==
- American Dream Meadowlands, New Jersey, USA
- Mall of America, Minnesota, USA
- West Edmonton Mall, Edmonton, Alberta, Canada

== Other ==
- Mega Mall Story, a simulation game
- Megamall (film), a 2009 documentary on the controversial Palisades Center, New York
