= Webby Awards =

Award for online content

The Webby Awards
- Logo
- Awarded for: "Excellence on the Internet including Websites, Interactive Advertising, Online Film & Video and Mobile content."
- Presented by: International Academy of Digital Arts and Sciences
- First award: 1996; 30 years ago
- Website: webbyawards.com

The Webby Awards (colloquially referred to as the Webbys) are awards for excellence on the Internet presented annually by the International Academy of Digital Arts and Sciences, a judging body composed of over three thousand industry experts and technology innovators. Categories include websites, advertising and media, online film and video, mobile sites and apps, and social.

Two winners are selected in each category, one by members of The International Academy of Digital Arts and Sciences, and one by the public who cast their votes during Webby People's Voice voting. Each winner presents a five-word acceptance speech, a trademark of the annual awards show.

In its early years, the award was hailed as the "Internet's highest honor" and was associated with the phrase "The Oscars of the Internet".

== History ==
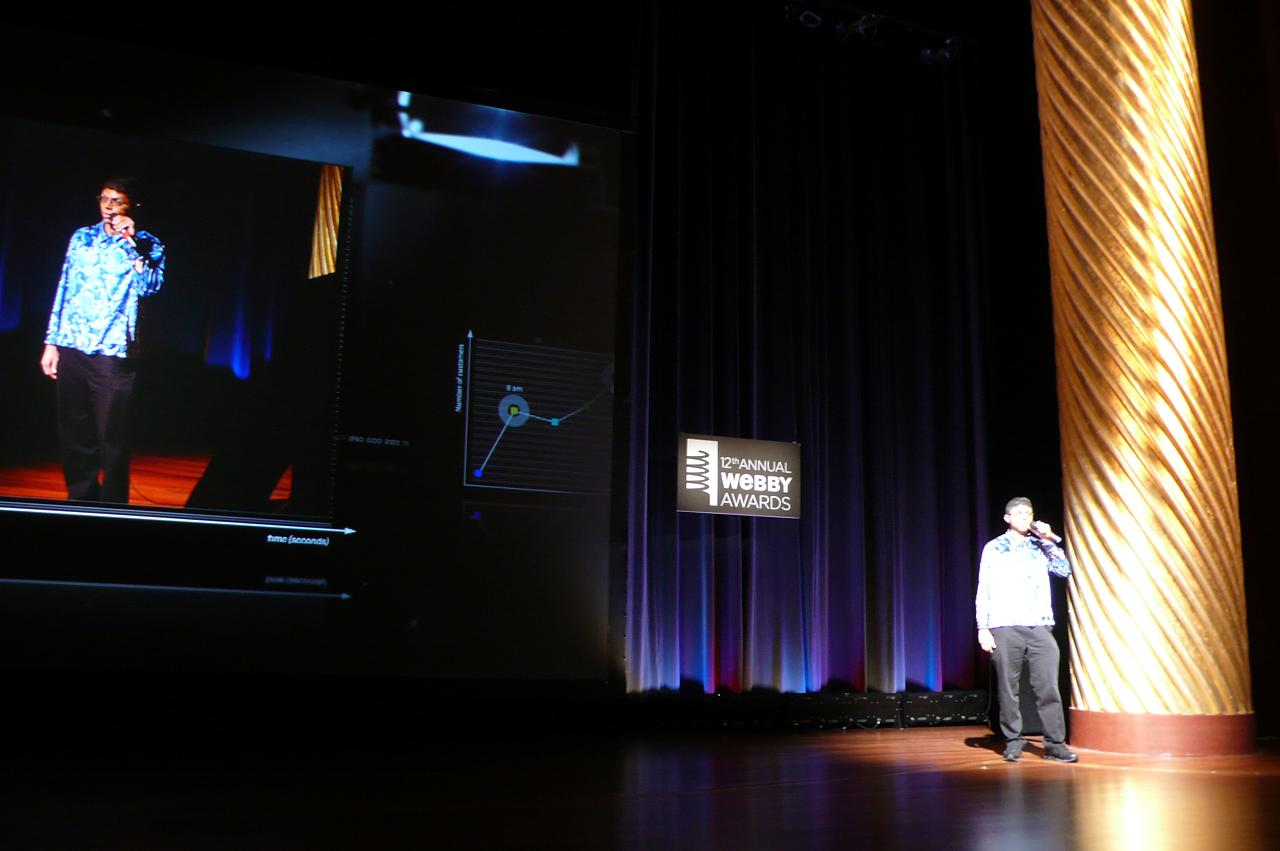
2008 Webby Awards, Chocolate Rain

In its early years, the organization was one of several vying to be the premiere internet awards show. Both the Webbys and the Cool Site of the Year Awards would compare themselves to the Oscars, as did media outlets including The New York Times and Canada's Globe & Mail.

The winners of the First Annual Webby Awards in 1995 were presented by John Brancato and Michael Ferris, writers for Columbia Pictures. It was held at the Hollywood Roosevelt Hotel. The televised Webby Awards were sponsored by the Academy of Web Design and Cool Site of the Day. The first Webby Awards were produced by Kay Dangaard at the Hollywood Roosevelt Hotel as a nod to the first site of the Academy of Motion Picture Arts and Sciences (Oscars). That first year, they were called "Webbie" Awards. The first "Site of the Year" winner was the pioneer webisodic serial The Spot.

The modern Webby Awards were co-founded by Tiffany Shlain, a filmmaker, when she was hired by The Web Magazine to re-establish them, and were first held in San Francisco in 1997. They quickly became known for its requirement that winners give their acceptance speeches in five words. After this, the awards became more successful than the magazine and IDG closed the publication. Shlain and co-founder Maya Draisin Farrah continued to run The Webby Awards until 2004.

The International Academy of Digital Arts and Sciences, which selects the winners of The Webby Awards, was established in 1998 by co-founders Tiffany Shlain, Spencer Ante and Maya Draisin. Members of the Academy include Kevin Spacey, Grimes, Questlove, Internet inventor Vint Cerf, Instagram's Head of Fashion Partnerships Eva Chen, comedian Jimmy Kimmel, Twitter founder Biz Stone, Vice Media co-founder and CEO Shane Smith, Tumblr's David Karp, Director of Harvard's Berkman Klein Center for Internet & Society Susan P. Crawford, Refinery29's Executive Creative Director Piera Gelardi, and CEO and co-founder of Gimlet Media Alex Blumberg.

The Webby Awards is owned and operated by the Webby Media Group, a division of Recognition Media, which also owns and produces the Lovie Awards in Europe and Netted by the Webbys, a daily email publication launched in 2009. David-Michel Davies, CEO of Webby Media Group, current Executive Director of the Webby Awards and co-founder of Internet Week New York, was named Executive Director of the Webby Awards in 2005.

In 2009, the 13th Annual Webby Awards received nearly 10,000 entries from all 50 US states and over 60 countries. That same year, more than 500,000 votes were cast in The Webby People's Voice Awards. In 2012, the 16th Annual Webby awards received 1.5 million votes from more than 200 countries for the People's Voice awards. In 2015, the 19th Annual Webby Awards received nearly 13,000 entries from all 50 U.S. states and over 60 countries worldwide.

In 2007, the 11th Annual Webby Awards introduced new categories for Online Film & Video and Mobile Sites & Apps, expanding the awards beyond websites and interactive advertising.

In 2008, the Webby Media Group co-founded Internet Week New York with the office of Mayor Bloomberg.

At the 16th Annual Webby Awards in 2012, held at the Hammerstein Ballroom in New York City, New York City mayor Michael Bloomberg received the Lifetime Achievement Award, presented by Tumblr founder David Karp. The ceremony also featured a tribute to the late Apple co-founder Steve Jobs, with video messages from President Obama, President Clinton, and Bono.

In 2015, the awards introduced the Social Movement of the Year category; the inaugural honoree was Black Lives Matter, with co-founder Opal Tometi delivering the five-word acceptance speech "Stay turnt: Black Lives Matter," presented by filmmaker Spike Lee. At the 20th Annual ceremony in 2016, Kim Kardashian received the inaugural Break the Internet Award, and satirical publication The Onion was honored with the Lifetime Achievement Award after accumulating a record 39 Webby wins.

== Nomination process ==
The 2000 awards began the transition to nominee submissions. Previously, nominees had been selected by an internal committee.

As early as 2017, organizations wanting to nominate themselves were charged $395 for a single entry. An "ad campaign entry" would cost $595. By 2024, those fees had risen to $495 and $675, respectively.

Executive Academy Members with category-specific expertise evaluate the shortlisted entries based on the appropriate Website, Advertising & Media, Online Film & Video, Mobile Sites & Apps, and Social category criteria, and cast ballots to determine Webby Honorees, Nominees and Webby Winners. Deloitte provides vote tabulation consulting for the Webby Awards.

In addition to the award given in each category by the International Academy of Digital Arts and Sciences, another winner is selected in each category as determined by the general public during People's Voice voting. Winners of both the Academy-selected and People's Voice-selected awards are invited to the Webbys.

== Awards granted ==
The Webby Awards are presented in over a hundred categories among all four types of entries. A website can be entered in multiple categories and receive multiple awards. In each category, two awards are handed out: a Webby Award selected by The International Academy of Digital Arts and Sciences, and a People's Voice Award selected by the general public.

== Ceremony ==
Between 2005 and 2019, the Webby Awards were presented in New York City. Many of the ceremony hosts are comedians and comedic actors. Comedian Rob Corddry hosted the ceremony from 2005 to 2007. Seth Meyers of Saturday Night Live hosted in 2008 and 2009, B.J. Novak of the sitcom The Office in 2010, and Lisa Kudrow in 2011. Comedian, actor, and writer Patton Oswalt hosted from 2012 to 2014. Comedian Hannibal Buress hosted in 2015.

Ceremony hosts from 2016 to 2019 included Nick Offerman (2016), Joel McHale (2017), Amber Ruffin (2018), and Jenny Slate (2019).

In 2020, due to the COVID-19 pandemic, the planned New York City ceremony was canceled and the 24th Annual Webby Awards were held as a virtual event titled "WFH: Webbys From Home," hosted by Patton Oswalt. The event was dedicated to individuals and organizations using the internet in response to the pandemic.

The Webbys are famous for limiting recipients to five-word speeches, which are often humorous, although some exceed the limit. In 2005 when accepting his Lifetime Achievement Award, former Vice President Al Gore's speech was "Please don't recount this vote." He was introduced by Vint Cerf who used the same format to state, "We all invented the Internet." In 2013, the creator of the Graphics Interchange Format (GIF), Steve Wilhite, accepted his Webby and delivered his now famous five-word speech, "It's pronounced 'Jif' not 'Gif'."

== Criticism ==
The Webbys have been criticized for their pay-to-enter and pay-to-attend policy (winners and nominees also have to pay to attend the award ceremony), and thus for not taking most websites into consideration before distributing their awards. Gawker, its Valleywag column, and others, have called the awards a scam, with Valleywag saying, "...somewhere along the way, the organizers figured out that this goofy charade could be milked for profit."

In response, Webby Awards executive director David-Michel Davies told the Wall Street Journal that entry fees "provide the best and most sustainable model for ensuring that our judging process remains consistent and rigorous and is not dependent on things like sponsorships that can fluctuate from year to year."

== Anthem Awards ==
In 2021, the Webby organization started a new line of awards, the Anthem Awards, to honor the purpose and mission-driven work of people, companies and organizations worldwide. The finalists and winners are selected by the International Academy of Digital Arts and Sciences.

The awards were founded by The Webby Awards in partnership with the Ad Council, Born This Way Foundation, Feeding America, GLAAD, Mozilla, NAACP, NRDC, WWF, and XQ.

A portion of program revenue is directed to the Anthem Fund, a grant program supporting emerging organizations working to advance the recognized cause areas. Each winner is invited to record a one-sentence "Call to Action" speech, a tradition established at the inaugural ceremony.

The inaugural awards ceremony was held on February 28, 2022, as a virtual event hosted by actor Jay Ellis. Special Achievement honorees at the inaugural ceremony included tennis player Naomi Osaka, recognized for her advocacy around mental health and racial justice, and filmmaker Adam McKay. Other inaugural winners included Airbnb, the It Gets Better Project, the Lego Foundation, HBO Max, Nike, Netflix, the United Nations, The New York Times's 1619 Project, and Sesame Workshop, among others.

The awards recognize work across seven cause areas: diversity, equity and Inclusion; education, art and culture; health; human and civil rights; humanitarian action and services; responsible technology; and sustainability, environment and climate. Submissions are accepted from both for-profit and non-profit organizations, organized into eight entry sections: Campaigns; Content & Media; Community Engagement; Corporate Social Responsibility; Fundraising & Resource Development; Individual Recognition; Industry Specific Programs; and Product Innovation or Service. Unlike many digital-focused awards, work in any medium is eligible, including grassroots organizing, awareness campaigns, and digital movements.

=== Winners ===
==== 1st Annual Anthem Awards (2022) ====
The inaugural Anthem Awards ceremony was held virtually in February 2022, hosted by actor Jay Ellis, drawing nearly 2,500 entries from 36 countries. Winners included Color of Change, CNN, GLAAD, HBO Max, Netflix, The New York Times's 1619 Project, Planned Parenthood, Sesame Workshop, The Daily Show with Trevor Noah, RuPaul's Drag Race, Airbnb, the It Gets Better Project, the Lego Foundation, Nike, the United Nations, and Sandy Hook Promise. Special Achievement honorees included Naomi Osaka, filmmaker Adam McKay, and Jane Goodall, who received the inaugural Lifetime Achievement honor.

==== 2nd Annual Anthem Awards (2023) ====
The 2nd Annual Anthem Awards ceremony was held in New York City in February 2023, drawing over 2,000 entries from 44 countries. Winners included Rihanna's Clara Lionel Foundation, Michelle Obama's When We All Vote, the Solomon R. Guggenheim Museum, Planned Parenthood, Sesame Street, the ACLU, GLAAD, NASA, and UNHCR. Special Achievement honorees included Gloria Steinem, Ben Cohen and Jerry Greenfield of Ben & Jerry's, Billy Porter, Gabrielle Giffords, Amanda Gorman, and Oleksandra Matviichuk on behalf of the Center for Civil Liberties and the people of Ukraine.

==== 3rd Annual Anthem Awards (2024) ====
The 3rd Annual Anthem Awards ceremony was held in New York City in January 2024, drawing over 2,000 entries from 44 countries. Winners included Taylor Swift with Vote.org, the Elton John AIDS Foundation, The Daily Show with Trevor Noah, SiriusXM, Rare Beauty, the ACLU, Planned Parenthood, World Central Kitchen, AARP, UNICEF, and the It Gets Better Project. Special Achievement honorees included Matt Damon, Kevin Bacon, Jesse Tyler Ferguson, Selma Blair, Misty Copeland, Aurora James, Jesper Brodin of IKEA, and community activist Leon Ford.

==== 4th Annual Anthem Awards (2024) ====
The 4th Annual Anthem Awards winners were announced in November 2024, drawing over 2,300 entries from 34 countries. Winners included Rare Beauty by Selena Gomez, Jelly Roll with the Power to the Patients campaign, Becky G with NPR's Tiny Desk Concerts, Google, the George Lucas Educational Foundation, Amazon Music, GLAAD, and the Clinton Global Initiative. Special Achievement honorees included Teun van de Keuken of Tony's Chocolonely, Padma Lakshmi, and Christy Turlington Burns.

== See also ==
- Shorty Awards
- The Streamer Awards
- Streamy Awards
- List of web awards
