= Learning Resource Metadata Initiative =

Common vocabulary project

The Learning Resource Metadata Initiative (LRMI) is a project led by Creative Commons (CC) and the Association of Educational Publishers (AEP) to establish a common vocabulary for describing learning resources.
