= Kirkbi =

Family office of the Kristiansens

Kirkbi A/S
- Type: Private
- Industry: Family office
- Founded: April 1, 1995; 31 years ago
- Headquarters: Billund, Denmark
- Key people: Thomas Kirk Kristiansen (chairman); Søren Thorup Sørensen (CEO)
- Operating income: ▼13.61 billion kr. (2022)
- Net income: ▼10.67 billion kr. (2022)
- AUM: 97.00 billion kr. (2022)
- Total assets: ▲165.64 billion kr. (2022)
- Total equity: ▲139.50 billion kr. (2022)
- Owners: Kjeld Kirk Kristiansen; Thomas Kirk Kristiansen; Agnete Kirk Thinggaard; Sofie Kirk Kristiansen
- Number of employees: 208 (2022)
- Subsidiaries: The Lego Group (75%); Merlin Entertainments (47.5%); BrainPop
- Website: kirkbi.com

Kirkbi A/S is a Danish investment management company headquartered in Billund, Denmark, that serves as a family office to manage the fortune of the Kristiansen family, the current owners of the Lego Group. It owns 75% of The Lego Group, 47.5% of Merlin Entertainments, and 100% of BrainPop.

Kirkbi has additional offices in Copenhagen as well as Baar in Switzerland.

== History ==
Kirkbi was established on 1 April 1995, as a family office for the Kristiansen family, who are owners of the Lego Group. Its primary function is safeguarding the Lego brand and providing a creative platform for children. It also functions as the custodian of the Kristiansen family's wealth. It appoints one person from each generation as its active owner. After the death of Godtfred Kirk Christiansen, his son Kjeld took over.

Kirkbi also serves as an investment company for the Kristiansen family. Its investment activities can be split between core capital and thematic capital. Core capital includes real estate, equity, and fixed income assets, while thematic capital focuses on renewable energy investments. Notable companies that Kirbi has invested in for its core capital portfolio include Armacell, Falck, ISS A/S and Nilfisk. Kirkrbi also financed the Lego campus, which acts as the headquarters of the Lego Group.

In 2007, Kjeld bought out Gunhild's share of Kirkbi, leaving Kjeld and his children as the sole owners of Kirkbi and the Lego Group. Gunhild formed Kirk Kapital.

In 2005, the Lego Group sold Legoland to Merlin Entertainments during a time of financial distress. At the same time, Blackstone Inc. and Kirkbi acquired Merlin Entertainments for $105 million, with Kirkbi taking a 30% stake. In 2013, Merlin Entertainments held a $5.6 billion initial public offering, becoming a listed company. In 2019, Kirkbi, Blackstone, and CPP Investment Board took Merlin Entertainments private for $7.6 billion. This led to Kirkbi increasing its ownership of Merlin Entertainments to almost 50%.

In 2021, Kirkbi reported a profit of DKr 27 billion, quadrupling that of 2020, which was DKr 6.4 billion. The gains mainly came from its equity portfolio, with a return of 23.3%. However, it lost money regarding its stake in Merlin Entertainments due to COVID-19 lockdowns and its investments in fixed income and green energy. In 2022, Kirkbi invested US$40 million in Icelandic medical technology company Kerecis as part of a US$100 million financing round that valued the company at US$620 million.

On 1 May 2023, Kjeld passed ownership of Kirkbi to his son, Thomas Kirk Kristiansen, who now serves as the Chairman of Kirkbi and the Lego Group. 75% of Kirkbi shares will be split between the fourth generation of Thomas and his two sisters, Agnete and Sofie, where each will have around 25% each. Their father will hold 22.5%.

On 1 December 2023, Sofie sold 4 million shares in Kirkbi for $930 million.

On 12 April 2025, Kirkbi vice president Michael Halbye, who was considered to be the "boss" of Kirkbi, died in a skiing accident in Switzerland.

== See also ==
- Kirkbi AG v Ritvik Holdings Inc
