= Armacell =

Foam and insulation company based in Luxembourg

Armacell International S.A.
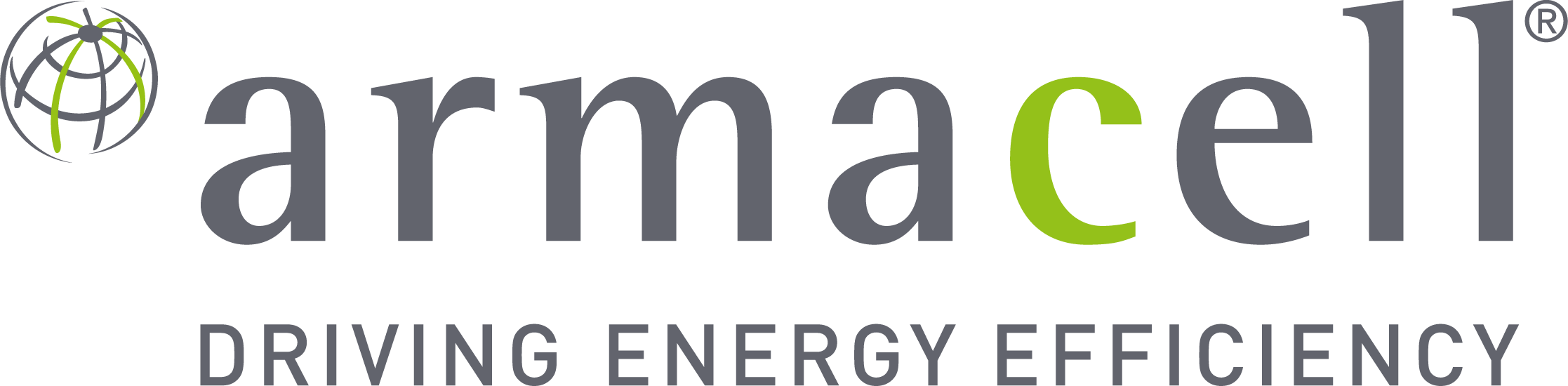

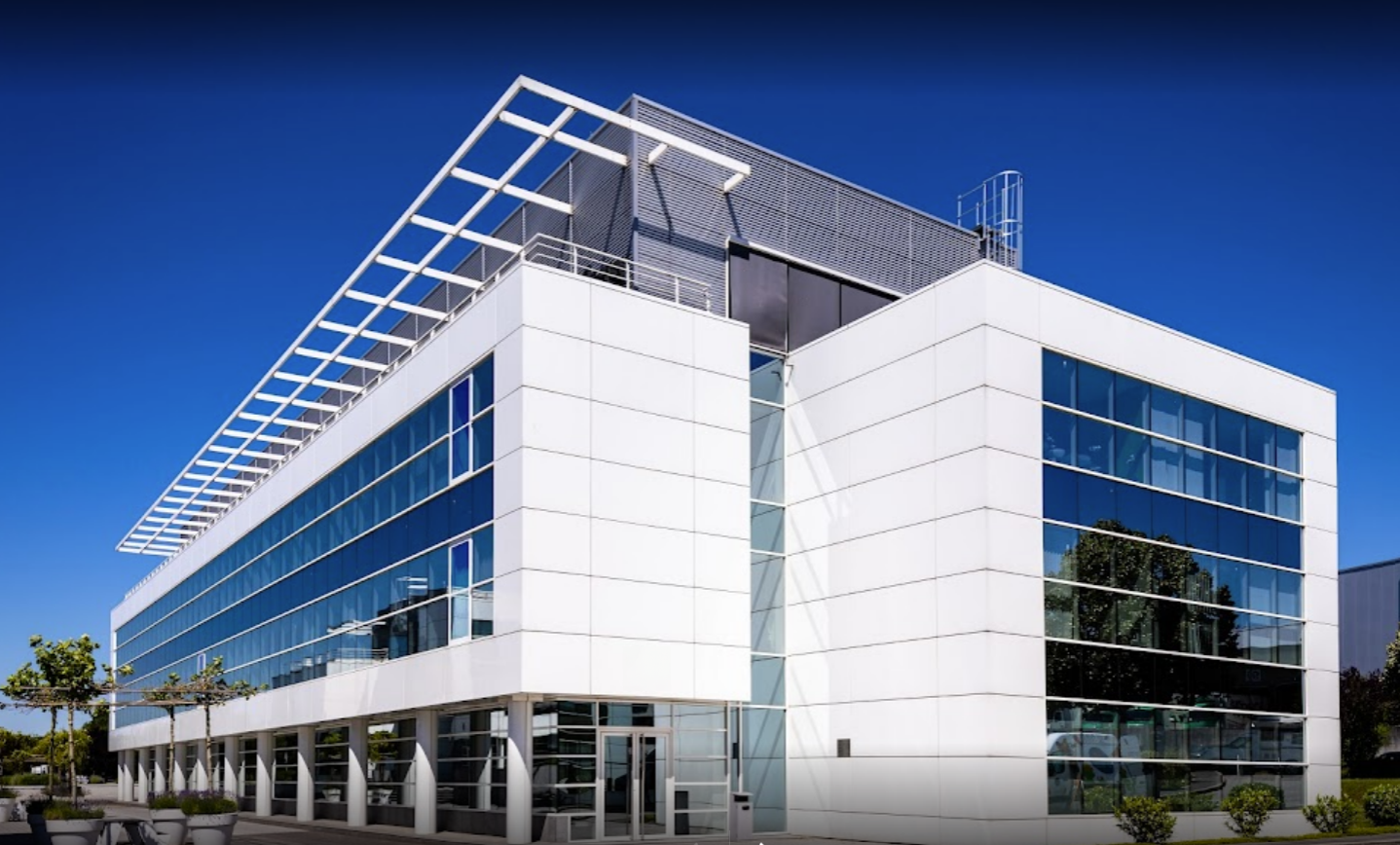
- Armacell Headquarters
- Industry: Chemicals
- Founded: 2000
- Headquarters: Luxembourg
- Key people: Laurent Musy (CEO)
- Products: Thermal, low-temperature and cryogenic industrial insulation materials
- Number of employees: 3,372
- Website: armacell.com

Armacell is a manufacturer and supplier of industrial foams and flexible insulation materials, based in Luxembourg. It has over 3,100 employees and 26 production plants in 20 countries.

== History ==
Armacell was the insulator manufacturing division of Armstrong World Industries, until a management buyout in June 2000. Founder Thomas Armstrong created the division in 1899, when Armstrong World Industries, started producing insulated corkboard and brick. In 1954, the division experienced success after launching Armaflex, a flexible technical insulator for pipe connections.

In 1960, Armstrong World Industries laid the foundation for Armstrong Kork GmbH in Germany to produce flooring. The company opened its first distribution office in Düsseldorf as part of their expansion in Europe. This became the foundation of Armstrong's European headquarters.

A new factory was erected in Münster in 1967, to handle increasing demand for Armaflex. The 1973 oil crisis led to innovations in heating-system insulators. Growth was propelled by West Germany's "Energieeinsparverordnung", a law obliging building owners to construct buildings that use as little energy for heating as possible.

In 1984, Swiss company Rothrist and its brand Tubolit were taken-over, adding insulations based on polyethylene to the range of products.

In 1991, the Münster site was equipped as a center for advanced research for insulation solutions. In June 2000, the insulation division became independent company Armacell International Holding, with all rights to Armaflex and Tubolit. In 2001, Armacell founded a new company division with a focus on technical foams.

At the end of 2019, the financial investor Blackstone sold the majority of the capital in Armacell to PAI partners, while the minority shareholder Kirkbi, who has held a stake in Armacell since 2016, increased its stake at the same time.

=== Expansion and acquisitions ===
The company expanded into Asia the following year, acquired a Thai producer of technical insulation and founded a new division for technical foams. In 2004, Armacell acquired Ensolite and Oletex and the associated facilities from the US-American RBX group. In 2005, Armacell took over American foam slab stock producer Monarch Rubber and Fagerdala Benelux S.A., a European producer of thermoplastic foams. In 2008, Armacell purchased MDS Leuze, a manufacturer of blank-sheet cable coatings and PropaCene.
