= Niels Christiansen =

Danish businessman

Niels B. Christiansen
- Born: 12 April 1966 (age 60); Sonderborg, Denmark
- Education: Technical University of Denmark (BA, MS); INSEAD (MBA)
- Occupation: Businessman
- Known for: Former CEO of Danfoss; CEO of Lego
- Title: President and CEO of The Lego Group
- Term: October 2017 – present
- Predecessor: Bali Padda

Niels B. Christiansen (born 12 April 1966) is a Danish businessman who is the president and chief executive officer of The Lego Group.

Christiansen was managing director and chief executive officer of Danfoss from October 2008 to July 2017, when he was succeeded by Kim Fausing. In August 2017, Lego announced that Christiansen would take over as chief executive officer in October. From January 2025, Christiansen has also been CEO of LEGO Holding.

== Education ==
As a student from Aabenraa State School, Christiansen graduated as a civil engineer from the Technical University of Denmark in 1991. He completed an MBA from INSEAD in 1993.

== Career ==
Christiansen was a management consultant at McKinsey from 1991 to 1995 and vice president of corporate development at the Hilti Corporation from 1995 to 1997, before being employed by GN netcom. From 2000 to 2003, he was the managing director and chief executive officer of GN Netcom, and from 2003 to 2004, he was the group executive vice president of GN Store Nord.

In 2004, Christiansen joined Danfoss, holding positions at the company such as COO (2005–2006), deputy managing director (2006–2008), and managing director and chief executive officer (2008–2017).

In October 2017, he became the managing director and chief executive officer of the LEGO Group.

In January 2025, he became the chief executive officer of LEGO Holding.

== Other board posts ==
Christiansen was chairman of Demant A/S. He is a member of the boards of Tetra Laval Group and of Coloplast A/S.
