= Martin Møller Nielsen =

Danish billionaire and businessperson

- Born: August 1964 (age 61)
- Known for: Founder, Nordic Aviation Capital

Martin Møller Nielsen (born August 1964) is a Swiss-based Danish billionaire businessman and the founder of Nordic Aviation Capital (NAC).

== Career ==
Møller founded NAC in Skive, Denmark in 1990. In 2015, he sold a 67% stake in the company to the private equity firms EQT and Kirkbi in a deal that valued the firm at $3.3 billion. As of 2022 Martin Møller is no longer a shareholder in NAC.

By 2016, NAC operated a fleet of 275 aircraft, leased to 30 regional airlines, including Air Berlin and Etihad. In 2021, the Sunday Times Rich List estimated his net worth to be £809 million.

Following his exit from NAC, Møller established Axiom Group, a family office that managers investments across various industries. In 2022, Axiom Group sold its remaining stake in Nordic Aviation Capital as part of a restructuring plan. He currently lives in Lugano, Switzerland.
