= Bali Padda =

British-Indian businessman (born 1956)

- Born: 1956 (age 69–70); Punjab, India
- Known for: The Timberland Company (2001–2002); The Lego Group (2002–2017)
- Title: President of The Lego Group
- Term: January 2017 - October 2017
- Predecessor: Jørgen Vig Knudstorp
- Successor: Niels Christiansen

Bali Padda is a British-Indian businessman who was briefly the CEO of The Lego Group. Prior to this role, he was Lego's chief operations officer. He inherited the role of CEO from Jørgen Vig Knudstorp, who stepped down to lead the LEGO Brand Group in January 2017. He was the first non-Danish top-level executive to run the 84-year-old company.

== Early life ==
Born in Punjab, Padda's parents migrated to the UK from Mumbai in search of a better life when he was 12. He dropped out of school and took up odd jobs at the age of 16.

He joined the LEGO Group in 2002 as Head of Market Oriented Packing based in Enfield, USA. Bali Padda came from a Customer Service & Supplier Relations background with GlaxoWellcome and Timberland before joining the LEGO Group.

Eight months after becoming CEO of LEGO, it was announced in August 2017, that Padda would be replaced by Niels Christiansen, effective from October 2017. The replacement was due to Padda's age.
