= Jørgen Vig Knudstorp =

Danish businessman (born 1968)

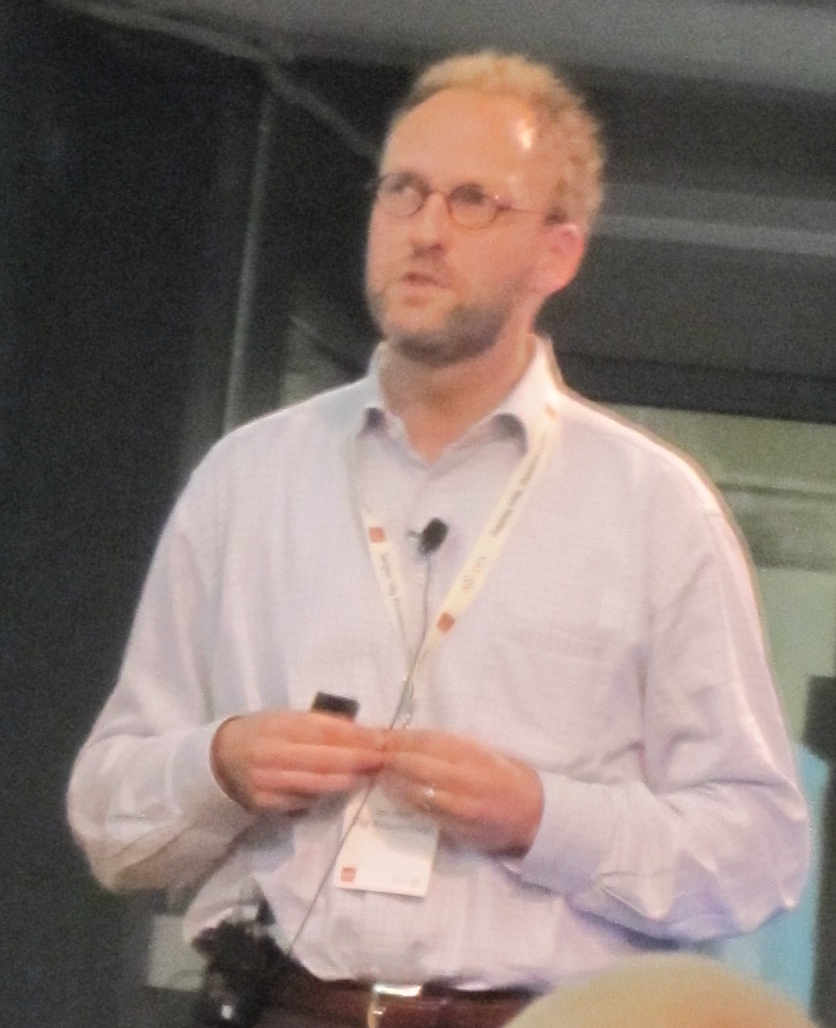
- Born: 21 November 1968 (age 57); Fredericia, Denmark
- Education: Aarhus University (BEcon, MS, PhD)
- Occupations: Businessman; business executive; consultant
- Title: President and CEO of The Lego Group (2004–2017)
- Spouse: Vanessa Knudstorp
- Children: 4

Jørgen Vig Knudstorp (born 21 November 1968) is a Danish businessman who is the Chairman of the Foundation and Supervisory Boards at IMD Business School since 1 January 2026. He currently serves as Deputy chair of the LEGO Foundation and chair of BrainPOP Education Inc. He is also lead independent director of Starbucks Corporation and a member of Nike's board of directors.

== Early years ==
Knudstorp was born on 21 November 1968 in Fredericia, Denmark. He graduated from Fredericia Gymnasium before attending Aarhus University.

After obtaining his undergraduate degree in economics, Knudstorp began an academic career as a researcher at his alma mater as well as obtaining a master's degree (1995) and a PhD (1998) in Economics from Aarhus University. He stayed in academia, but worked as a business consultant from 1998 to 2000.

== LEGO career ==
Jørgen Vig Knudstorp joined the LEGO Group in 2001 after working as a McKinsey & Company consultant and university researcher at Aarhus University. In 2004, he was selected as the company's next leader. He was the second person from outside the family of Ole Kirk Christiansen to lead the company (the first one being Vagn Holck Andersen between 1973 and 1979), and is widely credited with turning it around from failure.

Under Knudstorp's tenure, LEGO's yearly income went from a loss to drawing a notable profit. In 2016, the company experienced a 600% increase in turnover, from 6.3 billion to 37.9 billion. In December 2016, it was announced that Knudstorp would step down as CEO of LEGO, and instead take the position of chairman of the group. He was succeeded by Bali Padda.

== Positions outside Lego ==
In January 2017, Starbucks nominated Knudstorp to its board of directors. He joined the board of Merlin Entertainments in 2019.

== Personal life ==
Knudstorp is married to a medical doctor, Vanessa, with whom he has four children.
