= Padda, Kapurthala =

Padde bet
- Village
- Location in Punjab, India Padde bet (India)
- Coordinates: 31.464367°N 75.303317°E
- Country: India
- State: Punjab
- District: Kapurthala

Government
  - Type: Panchayati raj (India)
  - Body: Gram panchayat

Population (2011)
  - Total: 1,057
- Sex ratio 553/504♂/♀

Languages
  - Official: Punjabi
  - Other spoken: Hindi
- Time zone: UTC+5:30 (IST)
- PIN: 144804
- Telephone code: 01822
- ISO 3166 code: IN-PB
- Vehicle registration: PB-09
- Website: kapurthala.gov.in

Padde bet is a village in Kapurthala district of Punjab State, India. It is located 15 kilometres (9.3 mi) from Kapurthala, which is both district and sub-district headquarters of Padda. The village is administrated by a Sarpanch who is an elected representative of village as per the constitution of India and Panchayati raj (India).

== Demography ==
According to the report published by Census India in 2011, Padda has 244 houses with total population of 1,057 persons of which 553 are male and 504 females. Literacy rate of Padda is 71.70%, lower than the state average of 75.84%. The population of children in the age group 0–6 years is 110 which is 10.41% of total population. Child sex ratio is approximately 1000, higher than the state average of 846.

== Population data ==
| Particulars | Total | Male | Female |
|---|---|---|---|
| Total No. of Houses | 244 | - | - |
| Population | 1,057 | 553 | 504 |
| Child (0-6) | 110 | 55 | 55 |
| Schedule Caste | 270 | 133 | 137 |
| Schedule Tribe | 0 | 0 | 0 |
| Literacy | 71.70 % | 76.10 % | 66.82 % |
| Total Workers | 413 | 345 | 68 |
| Main Worker | 340 | 0 | 0 |
| Marginal Worker | 73 | 43 | 30 |
