= Agnete Kirk Thinggaard =

Danish dressage rider

Personal information
- Born: Agnete Kirk Kristiansen; 18 May 1983 (age 43)
- Education: Aarhus University
- Spouse: Claus Thinggaard (m. 2008; div. 2022)
- Children: 3
- Parent: Kjeld Kirk Kristiansen
- Relatives: Ole Kirk Christiansen (great-grandfather); Sofie Kirk Kristiansen (sister); Thomas Kirk Kristiansen (brother)
Medal record
Equestrian
Representing Denmark
European Championships
Silver medal – second place	2017 Gothenburg	Team dressage

Agnete Kirk Thinggaard (née : Kristiansen; born 18 May 1983) is a Danish Olympic dressage rider. Representing Denmark, she competed at the 2016 Summer Olympics in Rio de Janeiro where she finished 26th in the individual and 6th in the team competition.

Kirk Thinggaard also competed at two editions of Dressage World Cup finals (in 2015 and 2016), achieving 11th and 9th place, respectively. Through 2020, she had made 103 starts in FEI-recognized events.

She is the youngest daughter of former Lego CEO Kjeld Kirk Kristiansen, the granddaughter of Godtfred Kirk Christiansen and great-granddaughter of the company founder Ole Kirk Christiansen. Together with her father, sister Sofie and brother Thomas, they split ownership of a 75% stake in the company. According to Forbes, her net worth was estimated at $8 billion as of 2021. According to Olympedia, she may be the wealthiest Olympian of all time.

She married Claus Thinggaard in 2008 with whom she has three daughters. The couple divorced in 2022. She has a bachelor's degree in psychology from Aarhus University.
