= Association of Educational Publishers =

U.S. based non-profitable organization

- Abbreviation: AEP
- Successor: Association of American Publishers
- Type: Non-profit organization
- Purpose: Education policy and advocacy
- Location: United States
- Region served: United States
- Official language: English
- Formerly called: Educational Press Association of America

The Association of Educational Publishers (AEP) was a U.S. non-profit organization for educational publishers. It was active in public awareness campaigns on effective educational resources, as well as aiding communication between educational organizations, such as policy makers, teachers, educational foundations and associations, and the education media. It was founded in 1895 as Educational Press Association of America and was primarily a university-based association for most of its history. More information about the history and development of Educational Periodicals, Publishing companies and Educational Press Associations was recorded at the meeting of Experts in the Educational Press in Geneva, 14–18 July 1958.

The AEP merged with the school division of the Association of American Publishers in 2013.
