= Godtfred Kirk Christiansen =

Danish businessperson and second generation owner of The Lego Group

G. K. Christiansen
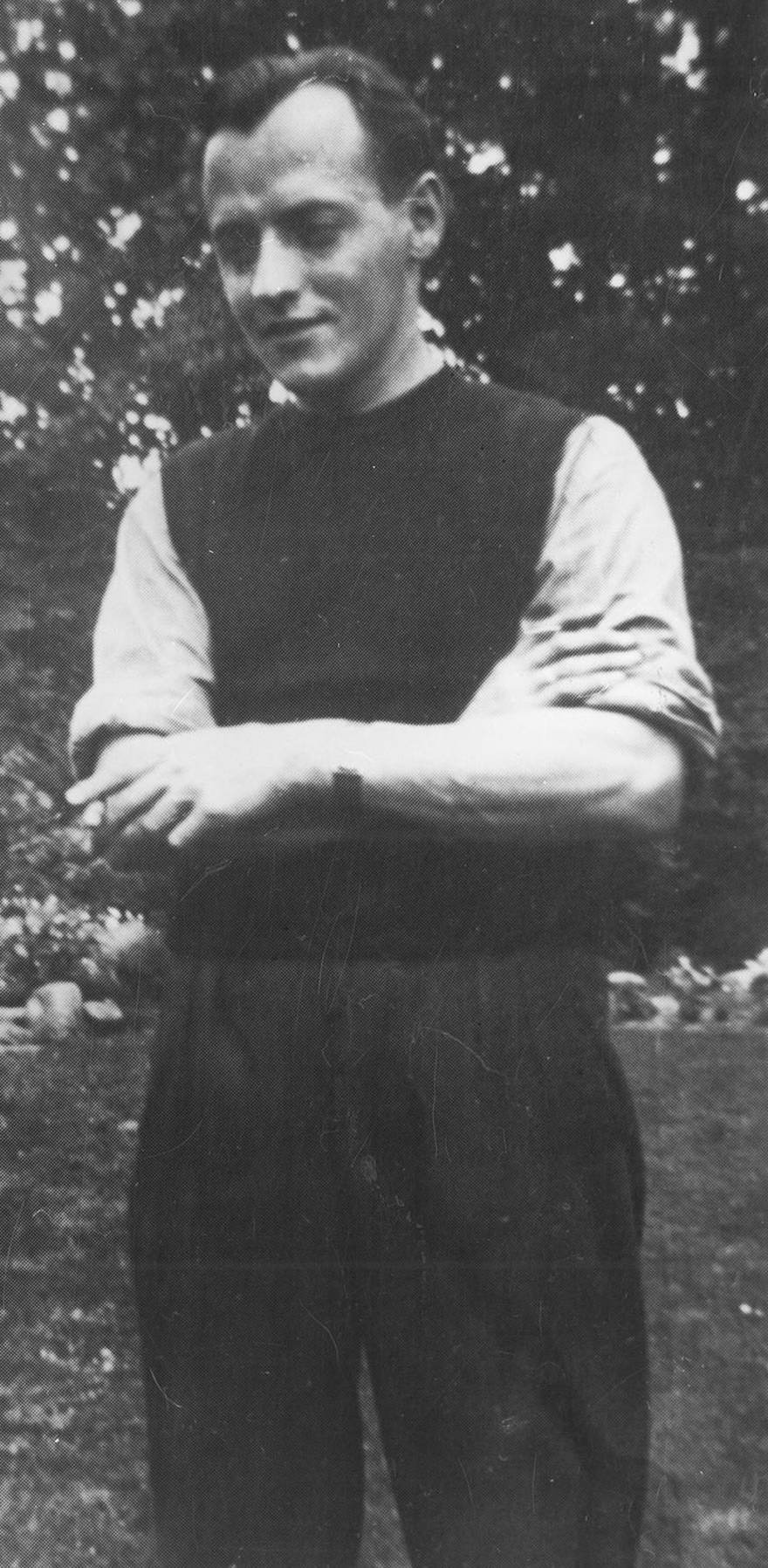
- Christiansen in 1950
- Born: 8 July 1920; Billund, Denmark
- Died: 13 July 1995 (aged 75); Billund, Denmark
- Resting place: Grene Churchyard, Billund, Denmark
- Occupation: Businessperson
- Known for: Managing Director of the Lego Group.
- Spouse: Edith Kirk Christiansen (m. 1944)
- Children: 3; including Kjeld
- Father: Ole Kirk Christiansen
- Relatives: Agnete Kirk Thinggaard (granddaughter)

Godtfred Kirk Christiansen (8 July 1920 – 13 July 1995) was a Danish businessman who was the managing director of the Lego Group from 1957 to 1973. He was the third son of company founder Ole Kirk Christiansen and took over as managing director in 1957, eventually becoming the sole owner. Godtfred is credited with playing a pivotal role in the development of the Lego brick design and patented it in 1958. He also created the Lego System in Play, the cornerstone of the Lego construction toy. Godtfred stepped down as Leader of the company in 1973. His son Kjeld Kirk Christiansen became president in 1979.

== Early life ==
Godtfred Kirk Christiansen was born on 8 July 1920 into a poor family and received limited formal education. He was the third son of five siblings. His father Ole Kirk Christiansen owned the Billund Woodworking and Carpentry Shop, a small family business based in Billund, which produced wooden furniture and built property.

In 1924, at the age of four, Godtfred and his brother Karl Georg accidentally caused a fire and burned the woodworking shop to the ground. Godtfred later recalled, "My first contribution to the company – not that I'm proud of it – was when my brother Karl Georg and I lit the glue heater. Unfortunately some wood shavings caught fire – and the whole building burned to the ground."

During the 1930s, the business suffered from the impact of the Great Depression, and Godtfred's father focused on the production of household essentials, such as ironing boards, stepladders and small wooden toys. In 1932, when Godtfred was 12, his father founded the toymaking company that would become The Lego Group. Godtfred showed a particular interest in his father's business and helped out in the woodworking shop when he was not attending school. On one occasion, Godtfred tried to save the company money by applying only two coats of varnish to a batch of wooden ducks instead of the usual three; his father was displeased with this and made him retrieve and re-varnish the entire batch by himself. Godtfred later said that this punishment taught him an important lesson about maintaining high-quality production.

In 1937, at the age of 17, Godtfred had started to design wooden toys. From 1939 to 1940, while studying at Haslev Technical College on the Danish island of Zealand, Godtfred sent sketches for wooden toys to his father as ideas for new products.

== Business career ==
=== Early career ===
Godtfred took increasing responsibility in his father's business and in 1950, he became Junior Vice President of the company on his 30th birthday. Motivated by his ambition to better understand the business, he embarked on a sales trip in 1951, accompanied by his wife, Edith, which involved visiting all the customers in southern Jutland. This resulted in Godtfred winning several orders and also helped him to understand how products were displayed in shops. In 1952, he experienced a major disagreement with his father, who wanted to expand the factory. As a result, Godtfred resigned, but father and son later put aside their differences and he resumed his position.

=== Lego brick ===
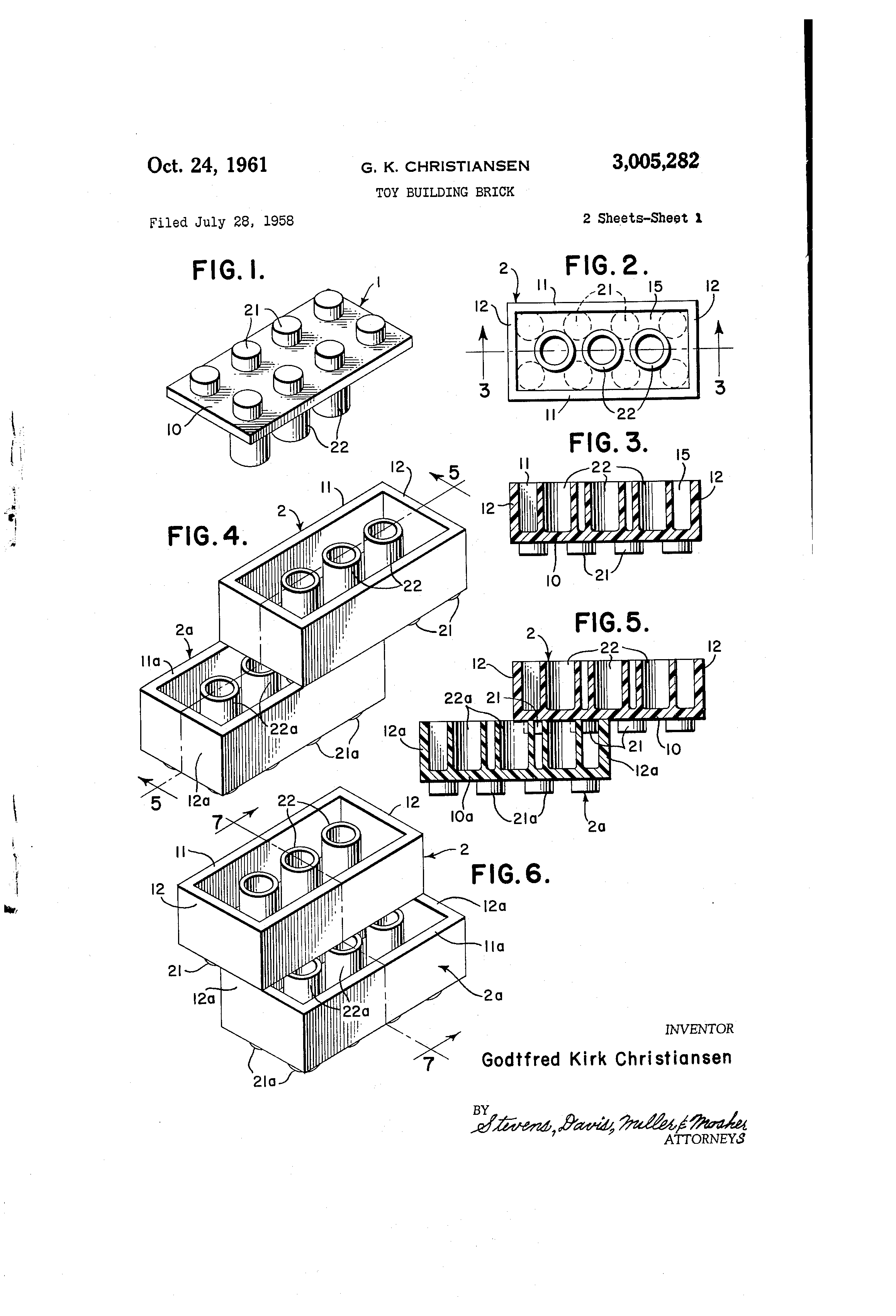
1961 US Patent drawing for the Lego brick (the original was filed in Copenhagen in 1958)

In 1946, the business made the first move towards the production of plastic toys with the purchase of a plastic injection moulding machine. This led to the introduction of a plastic product called the Automatic Binding Brick, which was in production by 1949. Ole and Godtfred were inspired by the design of a stackable cube with two rows of four studs designed by Hilary Fisher Page. The design was modified by the Christiansens and in 1953, the modified plastic bricks were given the name "Lego bricks". Unfortunately, initial sales were poor, as the bricks were not very sturdy and did not stick together very well.

In 1958, Godtfred played a pivotal role in the development of the modern Lego brick. On 28 January 1958, Godtfred sat in a meeting with his brother, Karl Georg, and Axel Thomson, the head of the sales office in Germany, and they discussed the complaints that they had received regarding the lack of sturdiness and clutch power of the bricks. After discussing several solutions, Godtfred sketched some ideas on paper and finally handed a design to Ove Nielsen, the head of the Lego moulding shop. The design was for a new brick with two inner clutch tubes. On his way back from the patent office, Godtfred then considered whether three inner tubes would work more effectively. He asked Ove Nielsen to create a new sample, which was sent to the patent office. This design featuring the three inner clutch tubes was finally patented on 28 January 1958 and became the iconic design for the modern Lego brick.

=== Lego system ===
Godtfred is credited with defining the Lego System in Play, which became the cornerstone of the modern Lego construction toy. In 1954, he made a visit to a toy exhibition in Britain, where he met Troels Petersen, purchasing manager for the toy department of Magasin du Nord in Copenhagen. When Peterson commented that the toy industry had no system, Godtfred was inspired to invent a system that could be used in play and spent several months developing his idea. He defined six principles named the "Principles of Play" which included affordability, durability and suitability for boys and girls. Using these principles as a benchmark, he reviewed the company's portfolio of products and finally considered that the Lego brick conformed to all six principles and offered the most possibilities in terms of establishing a system of play.

Over the course of a year, Godtfred developed a single, integrated town theme that would allow children to create buildings and accessorise them. In 1955 Godtfred summarised the concept behind the system, "Our idea is to prepare the child for life, appealing to its imagination and developing the creative urge and joy of creation that are the driving force in every human being." The System of Play was launched in February 1955 at the Nuremberg Toy Fair. Despite early mixed reviews, it eventually achieved success in Denmark and later in Germany. The Lego System in Play eventually became the core focus of the business. Godtfred explained the system by stating that, "all elements fit together, can be used in multiple ways, can be built together. This means that bricks bought years ago will fit perfectly with bricks bought in the future."

In the following years, Godtfred continued to refine the system by defining its boundaries. He protected the integrity of the system by limiting the range of shapes and colours produced. The product range increased but it was strictly controlled by ensuring that all products consisted of these limited shapes and colours. This highly focused, expandable and integrated system eventually outlived its many competitors.

=== Ownership ===
Godtfred was appointed managing director in 1957 and became the head of the company after his father died in the following year. In February 1960, after a fire destroyed the woodworking factory, Godtfred decided to discontinue the company's manufacturing of wooden toys and focus exclusively on producing plastic bricks. The Lego bricks were becoming more widely known throughout Western Europe, whereas the wooden toys were only sold in Denmark. Godtfred's brothers, Karl Georg and Gerhardt, did not agree with Godtfred's decision and decided to leave the company. Consequently, Godtfred bought their shares in the company and became the sole owner.

=== Legoland ===
In the mid-1960s, a rising interest in model building resulted in an increasing number of visitors to the Lego factory. Visitors were given access to the factory and model exhibition, but eventually the growing number of visitors placed too much pressure on the company. Godtfred decided to solve the problem by exhibiting the models outdoors and asked Arnold Boutrup, a chief designer of a store in Copenhagen, to create a park. An area of land in Billund was transformed to create Miniland, a landscape of houses created with Lego bricks. The new park covered 14 acres and was built next to the Lego factory. Legoland Billund opened on 7 June 1968 and became a success, becoming one of the largest attractions in Denmark.

=== Late career ===
In 1973, Godtfred stepped down as managing director to take the position of chairman of the Board of Directors of Lego System A/S. The role of managing director was assumed by Vagn Holck Andersen from 1973 to 1979, until Godtfred's son, Kjeld Kirk Kristiansen took over as CEO in 1979. Godtfred continued in his role as chairman of the Board of Directors until April 1993.

== Family ==
Godtfred was married to Edith Kirk Christiansen, with whom he had three children, Gunhild Kirk Johansen, Kjeld Kirk Kristiansen and Hanne Christiansen. Box art designs for Lego products from the 1950s show all three of their children playing with Lego bricks.

== Death ==
Christiansen died on 13 July 1995 at the age of 75 at his home in Billund; his son Kjeld Kirk Kristiansen took over the company after his death.
