= Thomas Kirk Kristiansen =

Danish billionaire businessman

- Born: 18 February 1979 (age 47); Billund, Denmark
- Education: Aarhus Business College
- Title: Chairman of Kirkbi and The Lego Group
- Parent: Kjeld Kirk Kristiansen

Thomas Kirk Kristiansen (born 18 February 1979) is a Danish fourth-generation owner of the Lego Group. Together with his father Kjeld, and sisters Agnete and Sofie, they split ownership of a 75% stake in the company.

Among the children of Kjeld Kirk Kristiansen, Thomas is the most active in managing the company. In 2007, he joined the board of directors of the LEGO Foundation. In 2016, he became deputy chairman of the company, and in 2020 he was appointed chairman of the board of directors.

On 1 May 2023, his father passed the title of chairman of Kirkbi and the Lego Group to Thomas.

Thomas Kristiansen made the 2025 Forbes billionaires list with an estimated wealth of $7.7 billion, and occupied the 439th position as of 20 July 2025.

Thomas is married to the tournament rider Signe Kirk Kristiansen, with whom he has a daughter.
