= MEGA Alma-Ata =

- МЕGA Алма-Ата
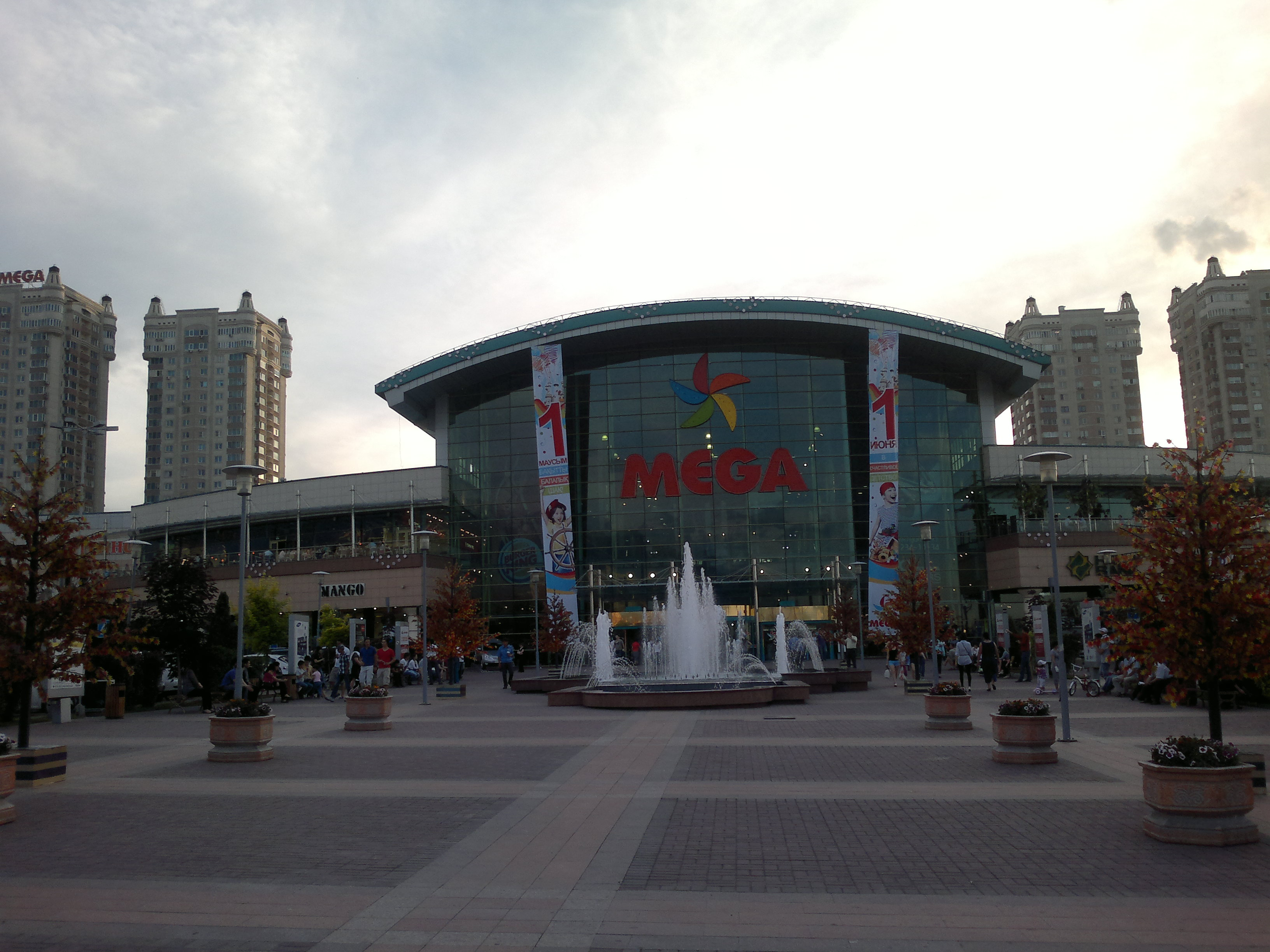
- Location: Almaty, Kazakhstan
- Coordinates: 43.2025°N 76.8921°E
- Address: 247a Rozykbaeva Street; 263 Rozykbaeva Street
- Opened: 25 October 2006 (MEGA Alma-Ata); 2 November 2013 (MEGA Alma-Ata 2)
- Owner: MEGA
- Architect: Chapman Taylor
- Floor area: 180,000 m2
- Floors: 3
- Parking: 1,734
- Website: mega.kz

The MEGA Alma-Ata (Kazakh: МЕGA Алма-Ата) is a large shopping and entertainment center in Almaty, Kazakhstan.

== History ==
MEGA Alma-Ata was opened on 25 October 2006 and is located at 247a Rozybakiev Street. The total area of the center is 175,300 m^{2}, and the commercial area is 80,470 m^{2}. The total amount to the project was 70 million dollars, and its implementation took 2.5 years. After its opening, the mall became the largest shopping and entertainment complex in Central Asia.

=== Mega Alma-Ata 2 ===
On 2 November 2013, MEGA Alma-Ata was expanded and the additional space was named MEGA Alma-Ata 2. The total area of it is 75 793 m^{2}, and the commercial area is 35 298 m^{2}. It houses 120 boutiques, 15 different cafes and restaurants, underground parking (21,243 m^{2}) and parking for 1,000 spaces.

During an opening ceremony of MEGA Alma-Ata 2, a world record was set for cooking and eating bauyrsaks: ten chefs cooked 667 kg bauyrsaks, which were completely eaten by visitors in two hours. The record was recorded by a judge of the Guinness Book of Records in the category "The largest number of cooked and eaten donuts".

== Structure ==
The shopping center has a hypermarket with an area of 6100 m^{2}, a hypermarket of household appliances (1800 m^{2}), a hypermarket for children's goods (2500 m^{2}), a food court for 700 seats, 20 cafes and restaurants, a 15-screen multiplex cinema, a total area of 8.5 thousand sq m, a climbing wall 16 m high, ice skating rink with an area of 638 m^{2}. The number of boutiques in the center reaches 120. There is an underground parking for 1,100 spaces with an area of 13,500 m^{2}.

== Visitors ==
According to Astana group, MEGA Alma-Ata is visited by about 10,000,000 visitors a year and, after the opening of the second stage, it is planned that the number of visitors will reach 15,000,000. On the day of the 6th anniversary of the mall, 57,000 people visited it.
