= Kjeld Kirk Kristiansen =

Danish billionaire and businessman

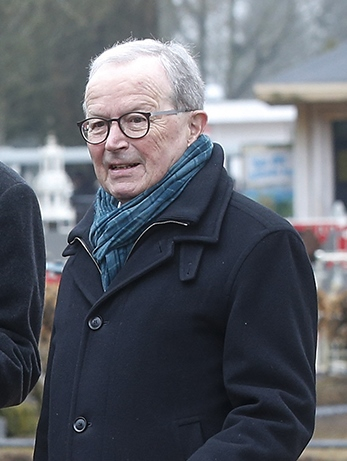
- Kristiansen in 2018
- Born: 27 December 1947 (age 78); Billund, Denmark
- Education: Aarhus University (BA); IMD Business School (MBA)
- Title: President and CEO of the Lego Group (1979–2004)
- Spouse: Camilla Kristiansen
- Children: Sofie; Thomas; Agnete
- Father: Godtfred Kirk Christiansen
- Relatives: Ole Kirk Christiansen (grandfather)

Kjeld Kirk Kristiansen R.1 (Danish: [ˈkʰelˀ ˈkʰiɐ̯k kʰʁeˈstjænˀsn̩, - kʰʁæˈ-]; born 27 December 1947) is a Danish businessman who was the president and chief executive officer of the Lego Group from 1979 to 2004. According to Forbes, Kristiansen has an estimated net worth of US$6.8 billion as of December 2025. He is the grandson of Lego founder Ole Kirk Christiansen.

== Early life and education ==
Kristiansen was born 27 December 1947 in Billund, Denmark. His father, Godtfred Kirk Christiansen, worked with his grandfather, Ole Kirk Christiansen, in the family business: Lego. As a child, he often inspired and tested new model concepts and their building instructions. He also appeared on many of the company's packages and marketing materials.

Kristiansen graduated with a bachelor's degree from Aarhus University. In 1972, he received an MBA from IMD Business School in Switzerland.

== Business career ==
In 1979, Kristiansen became president and CEO of the Lego Group. He introduced themes, minifigures, LEGO.com, Lego Mindstorms and licensed properties. In 2004, he stepped down as president and CEO to focus on his role as owner of the Lego Group and vice-chairman of the board, while maintaining his role as chairman of the board of KIRKBI A/S, Lego Holding A/S and the Lego Foundation. Lego is privately held and is controlled by the Kristiansen family and their foundations.

== Personal life ==
Kristiansen and his wife, Camilla, live in Denmark and have three children: Thomas Kirk Kristiansen, Sofie Kirk Kristiansen, and Agnete Kirk Thinggaard, a Danish Olympic dressage rider.

In 1995, Kristiansen bought Strathconon Estate, in the highlands of Scotland, covering 60,000 acres (24,000 ha). He later bought the neighbouring Scardroy and Ledgowan estates.

== Awards ==
He has received many awards in his professional career.

- Knight 1st Class (Officer) of Denmark's Order of the Dannebrog
- 1996: The Freedom Prize from the Max Schmidheiny Foundation, Switzerland
- 1996: Distinguished Family Business Award from the International Institute for Management Development (IMD), Switzerland
- Moran (Peony) insignia of the Order of Civil Merit from the Korean government
- Founder's Award from Dean Kamen
- 2008: he was inducted in the National Toy Hall of Fame. The Toy Hall of Fame was established in 1984 to recognize those people who have contributed most significantly to the toy industry. Past inductees include Ole Kirk Christiansen, Kjeld's grandfather and Lego founder, inducted in 1989.

== See also ==
- List of billionaires
