= The Lego Group =

Danish multinational toy company

Coordinates: 55°44′00″N 09°07′15″E

Lego A/S
- Logo used since 1998

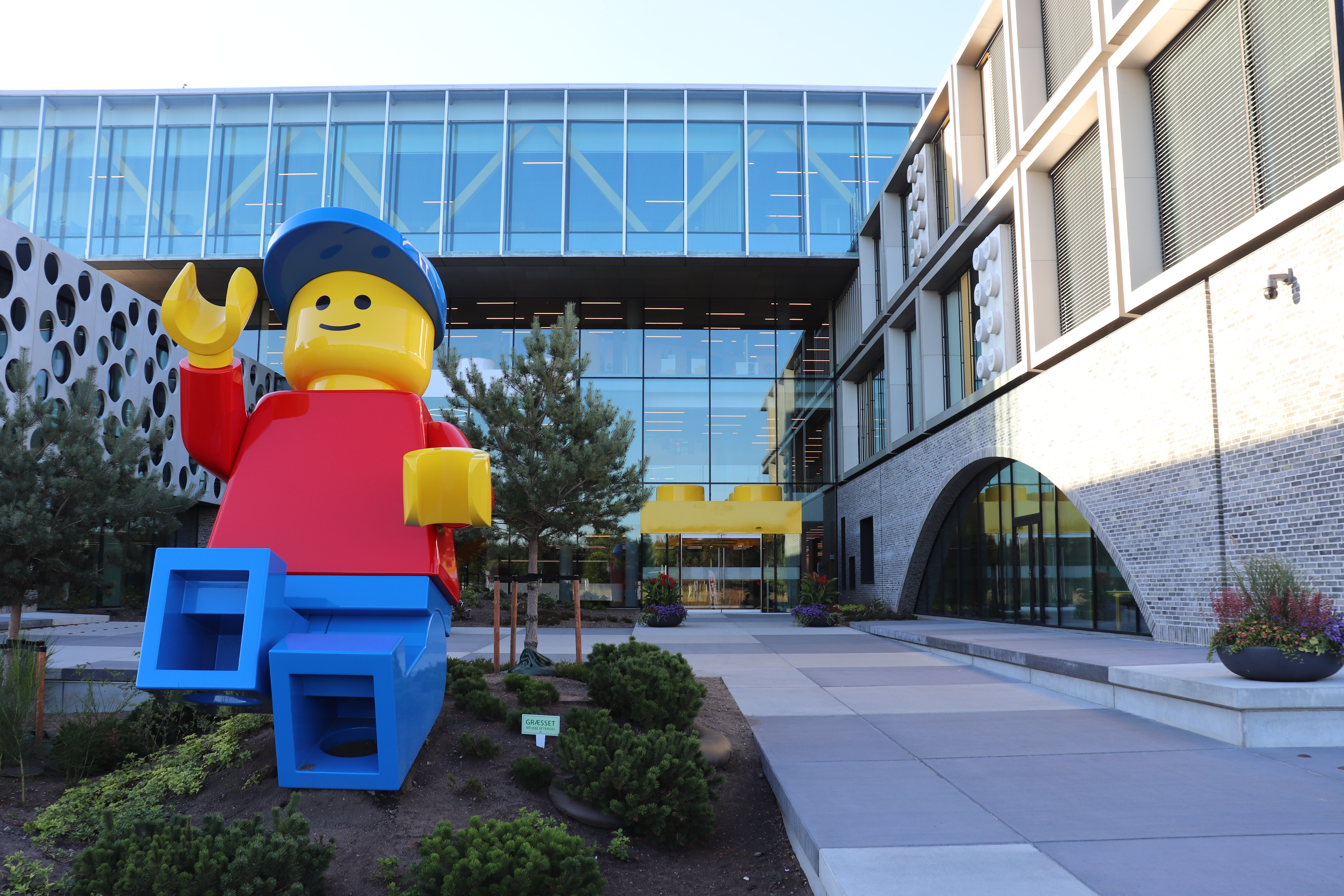
- Trade name: The Lego Group
- Type: Private
- Industry: Toys
- Founded: 10 August 1932; 94 years ago
- Founder: Ole Kirk Christiansen
- Headquarters: Lego Campus, Billund, Denmark
- Number of locations: 42 offices (2017)
- Area served: Worldwide
- Key people: Thomas Kirk Kristiansen; (chairman); Niels B. Christiansen; (CEO)
- Products: Lego
- Revenue: ▲74.3 billion kr. (2024)
- Operating income: ▲18.7 billion kr. (2024)
- Net income: ▲13.8 billion kr. (2024)
- Total assets: ▲68.7 billion kr. (2024)
- Owners: Kirkbi (75%); The Lego Foundation (25%)
- Number of employees: ▲31,282 (2024)
- Parent: Kirkbi
- Website: lego.com

Lego A/S, also known as the Lego Group, is a Danish construction toy manufacturer and media company based in Billund. It manufactures Lego-branded toys, consisting mostly of interlocking acrylonitrile butadiene styrene (ABS) plastic and rubber bricks. The Lego Group has also built several amusement parks around the world, each known as Legoland, and operates numerous retail stores.

The name Lego is derived from the Danish phrase leg godt, meaning "play well". The company was founded in 1932 by Ole Kirk Christiansen. In the first half of 2015, the Lego Group became the world's largest toy company by revenue, with sales amounting to US$2.1 billion, surpassing Mattel, which had US$1.9 billion in sales. As of 2025, the company is owned by the Kristiansen family via their family office, with backing from investment firm Kirkbi.

== History ==
The Lego company was founded in 1932 by Ole Kirk Christiansen, a carpenter whose primary business of producing household goods had suffered due to the Great Depression. Initially producing wooden toys, the company later developed a system of interlocking bricks. Manufacturing of plastic Lego bricks began in Denmark in 1947. After a fire in the woodworking department, Ole's son, Godtfred, decided to stop the production of wooden toys and solely focus on plastic products and the Lego system. In 1961, Christiansen built the beginning of Billund Airport to facilitate the sale of Lego toys around the world.

In North America, Samsonite managed the Lego brand from 1961 until 1972 (United States) and 1986 (Canada).

The name Lego is a contraction of the Danish words "Leg godt" (English: "Play well"). However, the name also means in Latin either "I collect", "I compose", "I choose", or "I read". These additional meanings, the first three of which are very relevant, only made sense when the company started making plastic blocks with studs (Lego blocks) that could be put together.

In 1995, the company's ruling Kristiansen/Christiansen family began running the Lego Group through the Kirkbi investment firm.

The basic Lego brick has remained unchanged since its patent, and this enduring design has been associated with the toy's widespread popularity. These bricks have become a recognizable part of childhood in many parts of the world. The Lego Group, which has remained family-owned by the Christiansen family, was among the first inductees to the U.S. National Toy Hall of Fame in 1998. Additionally, it was recognized as "Toy of the Century" by several organizations in 2000. Lego bricks have been utilized in various creative projects, including large-scale replicas of famous monuments such as the Eiffel Tower and Mount Rushmore, as well as modern art installations.

In the 21st century, the Lego brand expanded into various electronic games, including a series of Minifigure-based action-adventure games inspired by popular cultural franchises such as Star Wars, Batman, Marvel Comics, and the Harry Potter series. The brand also released The Lego Movie (2014), a computer-animated feature film centered on the adventures of Lego minifigures. A spin-off, The Lego Batman Movie (2017), focused on Batman, introduced in the original film.

In May 2025, the company moved its North American headquarters to Boston.

In January 2026, the Lego Group announced the Smart Play system at CES, introducing Smart Bricks, Smart Tags, and Smart Minifigures with embedded electronics designed to enable interactive play without screens. The system uses near-field magnetic positioning and a Bluetooth-based protocol called BrickNet to allow components to recognize and interact with each other.

== Trademark and patents ==
Since the expiry of the last standing Lego patent in 1989, several companies have produced interlocking bricks that are similar to Lego bricks. The toy company Tyco Toys produced such bricks for a time; other competitors include Mega Bloks and Best-Lock. These competitor products are typically "compatible" with Lego bricks, and are often marketed at a lower cost than Lego sets.

One such competitor is Coko, manufactured by Chinese company Tianjin Coko Toy Co., Ltd. In 2002, Lego Group's Swiss subsidiary Interlego AG sued the company for copyright infringement. A trial court found many Coko bricks to be infringing; Coko was ordered to cease manufacture of the infringing bricks, publish a formal apology in the Beijing Daily, and pay a small fee in damages to Interlego. On appeal, the Beijing High People's Court upheld the trial court's ruling.

In 2003, the Lego Group won a lawsuit in Norway against the marketing group Biltema for its sale of Coko products, because the company used product confusion for marketing purposes.

Also in 2003, a large shipment of Lego-like products marketed under the name "Enlighten" was seized by Finnish customs authorities. The packaging of the Enlighten products was similar to official Lego packaging. Their Chinese manufacturer failed to appear in court, and thus The Lego Group won a default action ordering the destruction of the shipment. The Lego Group footed the bill for the disposal of the 54,000 sets, citing a desire to avoid brand confusion and protect consumers from potentially inferior products.

In 2004, Best-Lock defeated a patent challenge from The Lego Group in the Oberlandesgericht, Hamburg.

The Lego Group attempted to trademark the "Lego Indicia", the studded appearance of the Lego brick, hoping to stop production of Mega Brands. On 24 May 2002, the Federal Court of Canada dismissed the case, asserting the design was functional and therefore ineligible for trademark protection. The Lego Group's appeal was dismissed by the Federal Court of Appeal on 14 July 2003. In October 2005, the Supreme Court ruled unanimously that "Trademark law should not be used to perpetuate monopoly rights enjoyed under now-expired patents" and held that Mega Bloks could continue to manufacture their bricks.

Because of fierce competition from copycat products, the company has always responded by being proactive in its patenting and has over 600 United States–granted design patents to its name.

== Financial results ==
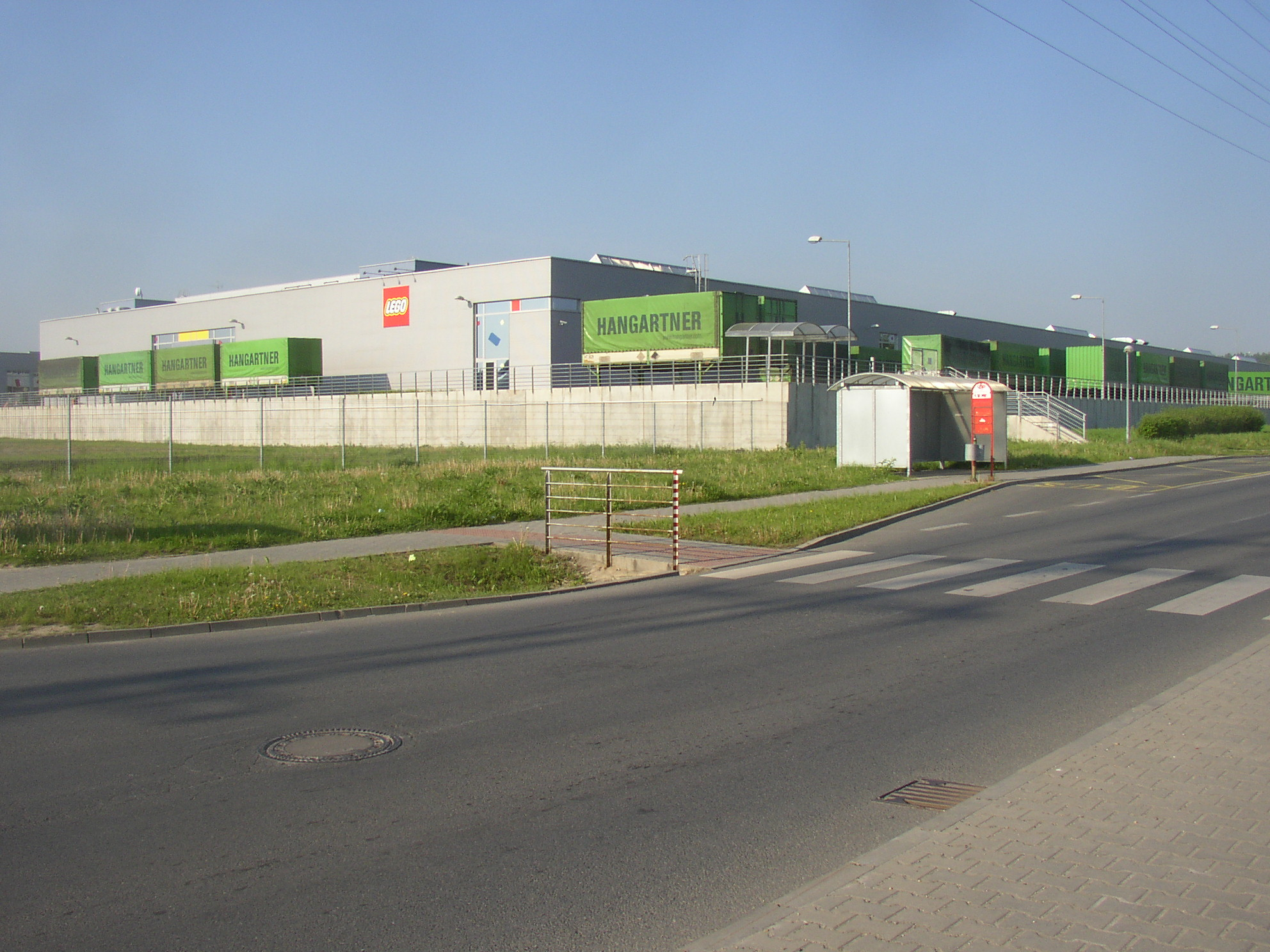
Lego factory in Kladno, Czech Republic, established in 2000. This is one of several sites in the world where Lego toys are manufactured (Denmark, Hungary, China and Mexico are the others).

In 2003, the Lego Group faced a budget deficit of kr. 1.4 billion (US$220 million at then-current exchange rates; equal to €175 million), causing Poul Plougmann to be replaced by Kjeld Kirk Kristiansen as president. In the following year, almost one thousand employees were laid off, due to budget cuts. However, in October 2004, on reporting an even larger deficit, Kristiansen also stepped down as president, while placing kr. 800 million of his private funds into the company.

In 2005, the Lego Group reported a 2004 net loss of kr. 1,931 million on a total turnover, including Legoland amusement parks, of kr. 7,934 million.

For 2005, the company returned a profit of kr. 702 million, having increased its revenue by 12% to kr. 7,050 million in 2005 against kr. 315 million in 2004. It also cut expenditures and disposed of amusement parks and a factory in Switzerland.

In 2011, sales for the company grew 11%, rising from US$2,847 million in 2010 to US$3,495 million in 2011. Profit for the 2011 fiscal year increased from US$661 million to US$776 million. The increased profit was due to the enormous popularity of the new brand Ninjago, which became the company's biggest product introduction ever.

In 2012, it was reported that the Lego Group had become the world's most valuable toy company ahead of Mattel with a value of over US$14.6 billion.

The Lego Group delivered a turnover of kr. 14,142 million in the first half of 2015 with an increase of 18% compared with the same period in 2014 measured in local currency (i.e. excluding the impact of foreign exchange rate changes). Net profit for the first half of 2015 was kr. 3,553 million compared with kr. 2,715 million for the first half of 2014. First half-year sales were driven by double-digit growth across all geographical regions and strong product innovation on themes such as Lego Ninjago, Lego Elves and Lego Creator.

The Lego Group announced on 4 September 2017 its intention to cut 1,400 jobs following reduced revenue and profit in the first half of the year, the first reported decrease in 13 years. The revenue losses are due to a more competitive environment, where the company has to compete not only against its traditional competitors Hasbro and Mattel, but also against technology companies such as Sony or Microsoft as more children use mobile devices for entertainment. The job cuts account for 8 per cent of the company's total workforce. In May 2018, the company made it to Forbes Top 100 World's Most Valuable Brands 2018, being 97th on the list.

== Legoland ==
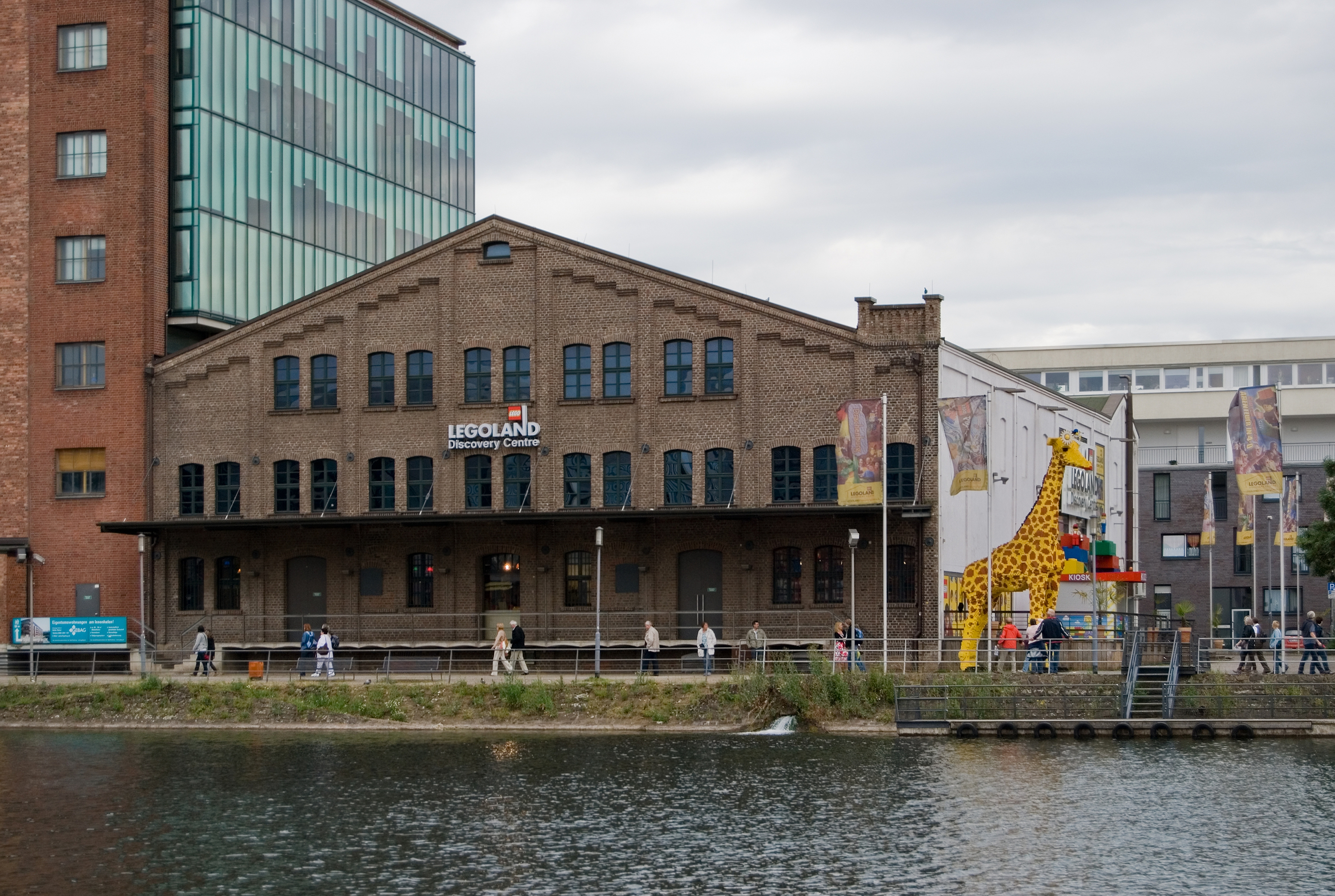
Legoland Discovery Centre in Duisburg, Germany

The Lego Group has built eleven amusement parks around the world, each known as Legoland. Each park features large-scale Lego models of famous landmarks and miniature Lego models of famous cities, along with Lego-themed rides. The first Legoland park was built in the Lego Group's home town of Billund in Denmark in 1968. This was followed by Legoland Windsor Resort in Windsor, England, Legoland California in Carlsbad, United States and Legoland Deutschland Resort in Günzburg, Germany. In addition, Legoland Sierksdorf was opened in 1973 but soon closed in 1976.

In July 2005, the Lego Group announced that it had reached a deal with private investment company Blackstone Inc. to sell all four parks for €375 million to the Blackstone subsidiary Merlin Entertainments. Under the terms of the deal, the Lego Group would take a 30% share in Merlin Entertainments and positions on their board. The sale of the theme parks was part of a wider strategy to restructure the company to focus on the core business of toy products.

In 2010, Merlin Entertainments opened the first Legoland water park at the Legoland California site. On 15 October 2011, Merlin Entertainments opened their first new Legoland park, Legoland Florida, in Winter Haven, Florida. It is the largest Legoland opened to date at 145 acres, and only one of the Legoland parks opened in the United States. The other Legoland (opened at a later date) water park was opened near the same location on 26 May 2012 after only four months of construction.

Merlin Entertainments opened their second new Legoland park in Iskandar Puteri, Malaysia under the name Legoland Malaysia Resort on 22 September 2012. It is the first Legoland in Asia and was quickly followed by another Lego-themed water park in the same area. The first Lego hotel has also opened near the site. People who stay in the hotel will also get tickets to the theme park and water park. The September 2016 they opened Legoland Dubai. In addition, they opened four new Legoland Discovery Centres, which take the Legoland concept and scale it down to suit a retail park environment.

Legoland Japan Resort was opened in 2017 in Nagoya, Japan.

Legoland Water Park Gardaland in Castelnuovo del Garda, Italy and Legoland New York in Goshen, New York, the largest of ten Legoland parks as of 2024, was opened in 2021.

In June 2019, the Lego Group purchased the remaining shares in Merlin Entertainments which they did not own and privatised the company. This returned the operation of the Legoland parks to the control of the Lego Group.

== Retail stores ==
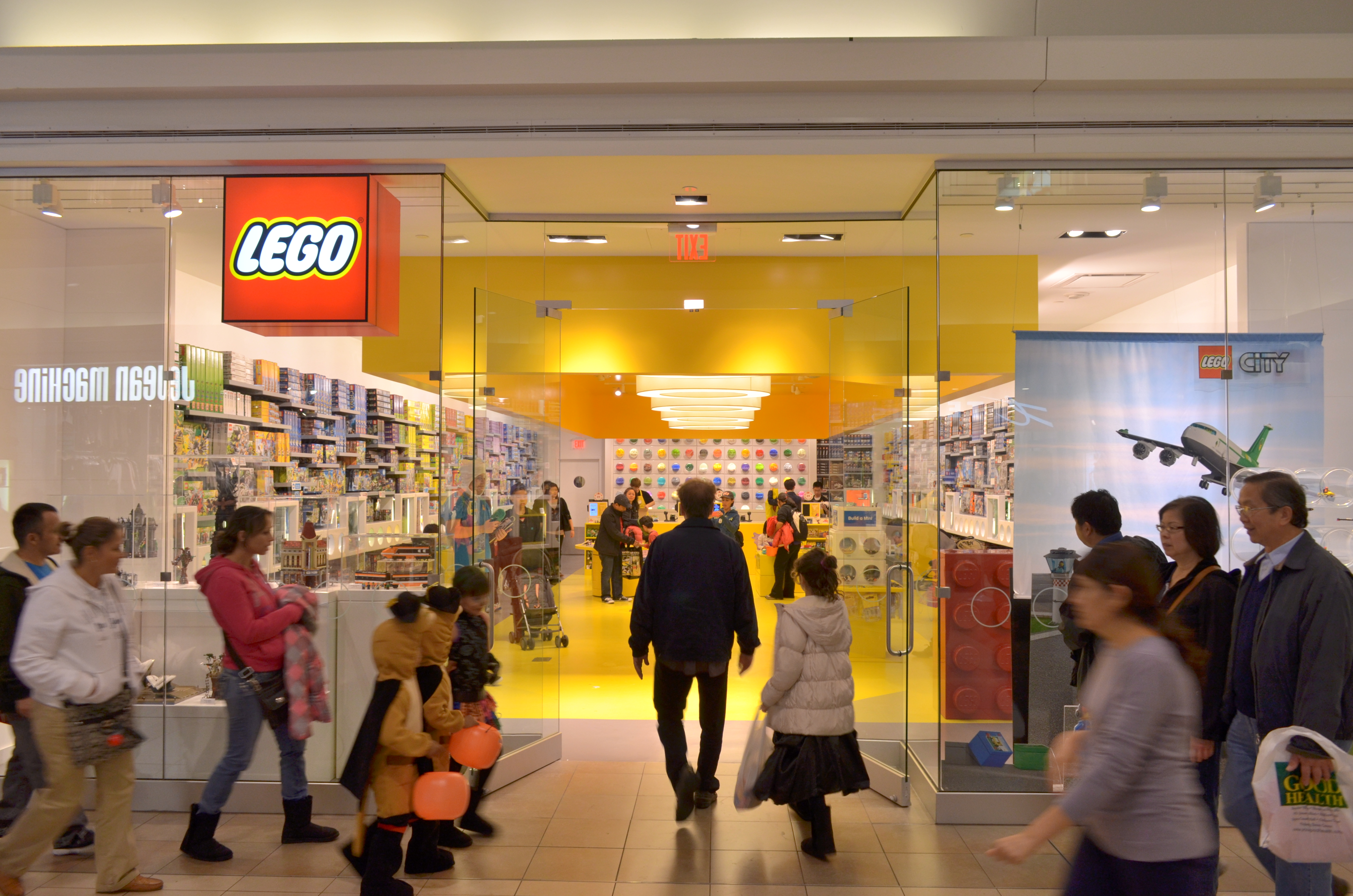
A Lego retail store in Canada

The Lego Group operates 211 Lego Brand stores in North America and Europe (13 in Canada, 121 in the United States, 2 in Austria, 2 in Belgium, 1 in Czech Republic, 4 in Denmark, 9 in France, 18 in Germany, 2 in Ireland, 4 in the Netherlands, 8 in Poland, 1 in Spain, 1 in Sweden, 1 in Switzerland, 24 in the United Kingdom). The Lego Group also franchised its store brand known as "Certified Stores", to third-party vendors such as the Majid Al Futtaim Group, which opened 6 stores in 2015 (4 in the United Arab Emirates, and 2 in Kuwait). As of 2023, there is a total of 424 stores operated by franchisees, mostly in Australia, Asia, and South America.

The Lego Group offers free "Lego Passports" at its stores, which contain blank pages to fill with rubber stamped designs that are available at different Lego retail locations. Each store has its own custom stamp.

=== Europe ===
In October 2002, the Lego Group introduced a significant change in its direct retail policy with the opening of the first so-called "Lego Brand Store" in Cologne, Germany. The second, in Milton Keynes, UK, followed quickly – several dozen more opened worldwide over the next few years, and most of the existing stores have been remodelled on the new "Brand Store" template. One of the distinctive features of these new stores is the inclusion of a "Pick-A-Brick" system that allows customers to buy individual bricks in bulk quantities. The opening of most of these stores, including the 2003 opening of one in the Birmingham Bull Ring shopping centre in England, have been marked by the production of a new, special, limited edition, commemorative Lego Duplo piece.

Lego opened the first brand store in its home country, Denmark, in Copenhagen on 13 December 2010. In 2016, three certified stores opened in Italy: one in Milan, one in the Orio Center, a shopping mall near the Milan Bergamo Airport in Bergamo, and another in Verona. On 18 August 2022, Ireland's first Lego store was opened in Dublin on Grafton Street. On 2 December 2022, an official store was opened in Brescia, bringing the total number of Lego stores in Italy to 29. In 2025, there were a total of 77 stores in Europe, which are operated by Lego itself. In London at Leicester Square, there is the former largest Lego store in the world, with an area of 805 m^{2}. The first Lego store is expected to open doors in Sofia, Bulgaria, on 19 December 2023 in the largest shopping centre in the city's Paradise Center. On 4 July 2026, Kazakhstan's first official Lego Certified Store opened in Almaty at the MEGA Alma-Ata shopping mall.

=== North America ===
In 1992, when the Mall of America opened in Bloomington, Minnesota, one of its premier attractions was the Lego Imagination Center (LIC), a large Lego store with displays of Lego sculptures and a play area with bins of bricks to build with. The store inventory includes a large selection of Lego sets for sale, including those advertised in Lego catalogues as "Not Available in Any Store". A second imagination centre opened at the Disney Springs (formerly Downtown Disney) at Walt Disney World in Orlando, Florida. Between 1999 and 2005, Lego opened 24 further stores in North America in 23 states. As of 2026, 121 Lego stores are operating in North America in 42 US states and 13 Lego stores are operating in five Canadian provinces. These stores sell various Lego merchandise, including minifigures, Pick-a-Brick, and custom packaged minifigures.

=== Asia ===
==== India ====
The first Lego store in India was opened in Chennai, Tamil Nadu in March 2014 by Funskool, under licence from the Lego Group. India's only operating Lego store in 2023 opened in Mumbai International Airport duty-free in 2021. The first Lego Group certified store in India opened in May 2025 in Gurgaon, Haryana.

==== Israel ====
The first Lego store in Israel was opened on the third floor of the Dizengoff Center in July 2022 and later in Cinema City Rishon-LeZion

== Lego Interactive ==
Lego Interactive (formerly Lego Media and later Lego Software) was the video game publishing division of the Lego Group. The company was founded as Lego Media in 1996 and headquartered in London, England. In February 1999, Lego Media announced their move into the girls' software industry, starting with Lego Friends. On December 10, 2001, the company entered into a worldwide three-year agreement with Electronic Arts to co-publish and distribute new and past titles. Eventually, the Lego Group opted out of the video game business and Lego Interactive was shut down in 2004. Former Lego Interactive staff opened Giant Interactive Entertainment to publish future Lego titles, which later became part of TT Games.

Lego Media also operated a motion picture division, which produced the BBC children's series Little Robots for Cosgrove Hall Films. In 2003, this division was rebranded to Create TV and Film Limited and became independent from the Lego Group under Lego's majority owner Kirkbi A/S, which allowed Create TV and Film to branch onto other projects. The company later produced Bionicle: Mask of Light, Bionicle 2: Legends of Metru Nui and Bionicle 3: Web of Shadows for Creative Capers Entertainment. In 2005, Kirkbi A/S sold Create TV and Film to its chief executive officer, Vanessa Chapman, and the company was renamed Create Media Ventures Limited. The sale included Little Robots but excluded the Bionicle movies, which were retained by the Lego Group. Create was later dissolved in August 2016.

== Production ==
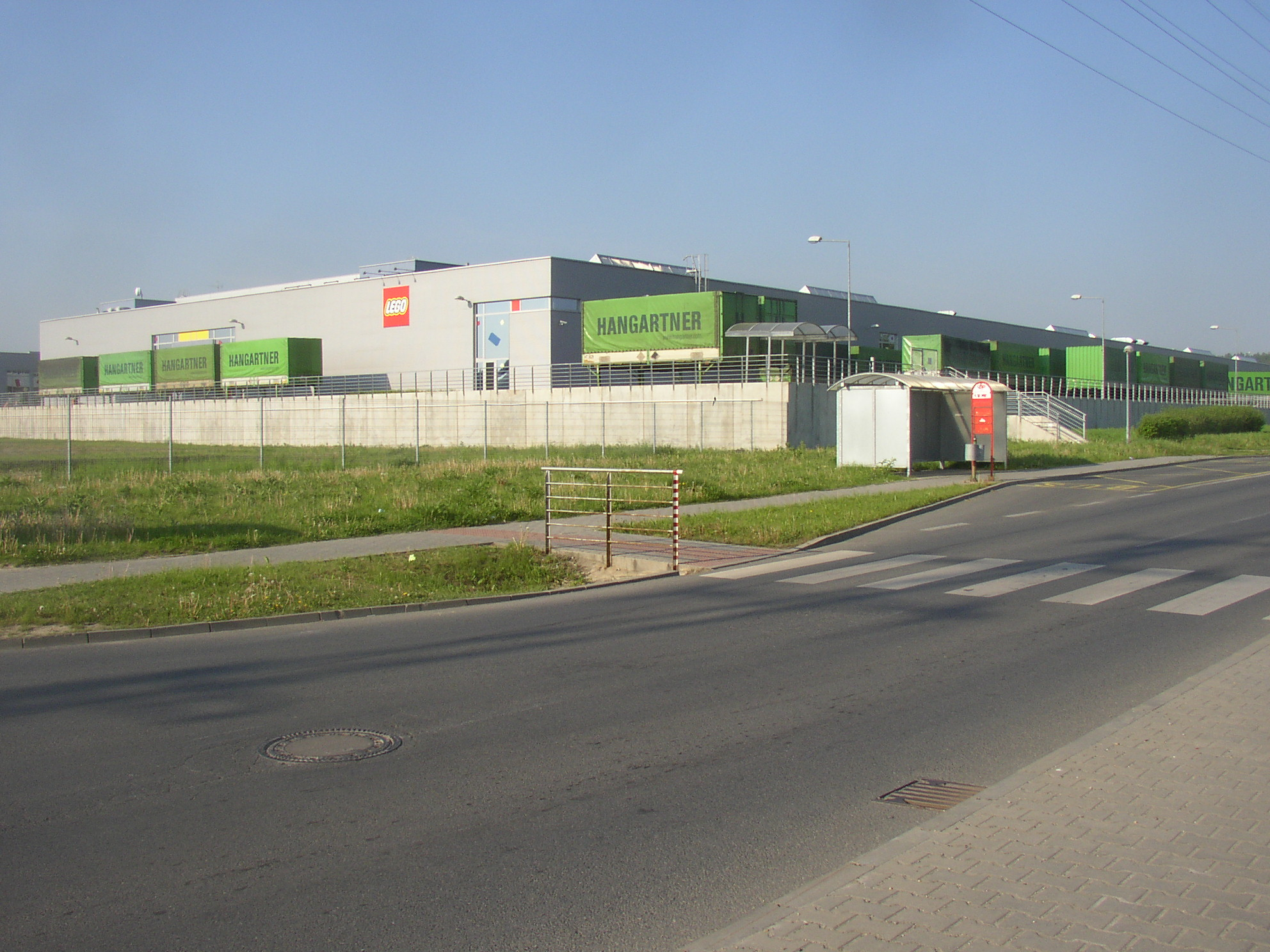
Lego factory in Kladno, Czech Republic, photographed in 2008

The Lego Group operates factories in Denmark, Hungary, the Czech Republic, Mexico, China and Vietnam. The company has organised its manufacturing and distribution network around its main regional markets. Its sixth factory opened in Vietnam in April 2025, while a seventh, in Chesterfield County, Virginia, United States, is scheduled to open in 2027.

Lego bricks are manufactured using injection moulding. The factories in Monterrey, Nyíregyháza, Jiaxing, and Ho Chi Minh City handle moulding, processing and packaging. The factory in Billund focuses on moulding, while Kladno specialises in processing and packaging.

Monterrey is Lego's largest factory by employment and produced more than 149 million sets in 2025. In September 2026, the company announced a further expansion expected to increase its production capacity by 35%. An expansion of the Nyíregyháza factory completed in 2025 increased its production capacity by 30%.

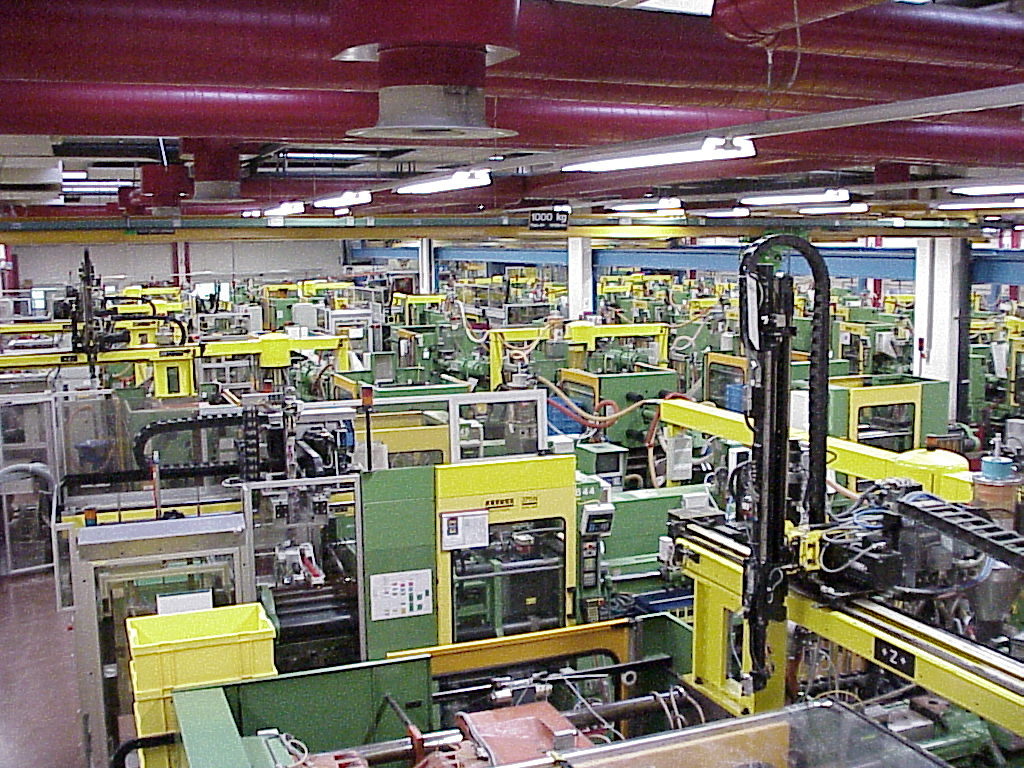
A Lego injection moulding plant in Neuhof, an area of Baar, Switzerland

The Kladno factory opened in 2000 and is Lego's largest packaging site in Europe. It can package up to four million sets per week during peak periods. The factory also assembles minifigures and builds large models for Legoland parks and Lego stores worldwide. Its engineers develop packaging equipment used at other Lego factories.

Lego opened its first company-operated brick-moulding factory outside Denmark in 1974, in Baar, Switzerland. The Baar plant closed in 2004, followed by the factory in Willisau in 2006.

== Environmental issues ==
In 2014, Lego announced that it would not renew its promotional contract with Shell following a Greenpeace campaign protesting Shell's plans to drill in the Arctic. Lego CEO Jørgen Vig Knudstorp expressed frustration at the company being used to target Shell, while Greenpeace insisted that firms like Lego should also consider their business partners' environmental impact.

Lego acknowledges the impact of its operations on the environment, in particular in areas such as climate change, resource and energy use and waste. The weathering of Lego bricks in the ocean over large timeframes results in smoothing, discoloration and fouling of the plastic surface. This, along with the deformation of the structure of the brick and the chemical additives that release microplastics into water, can potentially damage marine life. Despite these issues, all manufacturing sites are certified according to the environmental standard ISO 14001. The first Borkum Riffgrund 1 wind turbines off the coast of Germany began producing electricity in February 2015, which would help the Lego Group reach its goal of being based 100% on renewable energy by 2020.

The company claims to recycle 90% of its waste and that it has made its operations nearly one-third more energy efficient over the five years ending on 31 December 2013. It is seeking alternatives to crude oil as the raw material for its bricks. In June 2015, this resulted in the establishment of the Lego Sustainable Materials Centre, which is expected to recruit more than 100 employees, as a significant step towards the 2030 ambition of finding and implementing sustainable alternatives to current materials.

In 2023, online magazine Wired reported that Lego has faced challenges in transitioning from traditional acrylonitrile-butadiene-styrene plastic to more sustainable materials due to the difficulties in achieving the necessary durability and production efficiency. Despite previous commitments to reduce plastic waste, the company's recent efforts to create bricks from recycled plastic bottles did not result in the anticipated sustainable alternatives, as the production process resulted in a total increase of 1.6 tCO2e to 1.8 tCO2e from the previous year, a higher carbon footprint than anticipated.

In 2024, investigative journalism by Danish news broadcaster DR revealed that the Kirk Kristiansen family, owners of Lego, operate three private jets that have flown over 1,000 times between 2020 and 2023, often to destinations linked to vacations and events related to the family's hobby of horse riding. As private aviation is emitting considerable amounts of greenhouse gasses, reports raise concerns about the contrast between the family's private activities and Lego's public commitment to sustainability.

In 2025, Lego opened up a $1 billion factory in Vietnam that plans to run entirely on clean energy. Along with the opening, the company planted 50,000 trees, twice the number it cut to clear land for the factory. News cooperative Associated Press reported that the five buildings which make up the factory meet high energy efficiency standards. It is the first Lego factory to replace single-use plastic bags with paper alternatives for packaging, with the company reaching a worldwide total of 56% of plastic bags replaced.

The company stays committed with its plans to reduce their overall carbon emissions by 37% by 2032, and pledge to achieve net-zero GHG emissions by 2050.

== Gender equality and human rights ==
In January 2014, a handwritten letter to Lego from a seven-year-old American girl, Charlotte Benjamin, received widespread attention in the media. In it, the young author complained that there were "more Lego boy people and barely any Lego girls" and observed that "all the girls did was sit at home, go to the beach, and shop, and they had no jobs, but the boys went on adventures, worked, saved people … even swam with sharks".

In June 2014, it was announced that Lego would be launching a new "Research Institute" collection featuring female scientists including a female chemist, palaeontologist, and astronomer. The science-themed project was selected as the latest Lego Ideas winner and was submitted by Ellen Kooijman, a geochemist in Stockholm. Lego denied claims that the set was introduced to placate criticism of the company by activists, pointing to its Lego Ideas origins. The Research Institute range sold out within a week of its online release in August 2014. The BBC's Tom de Castella reported that Kooijman was pleased with the set's final design, despite the addition of face makeup to her original proposal, and that Becky Francis, professor of education and social justice at King's College London, who had been "very, very disappointed" by Lego Friends, is a fan.

In June 2021, Lego released a set entitled "Everyone Is Awesome" to celebrate and recognize the LGBTQ+ community, including pieces in the colours of the Rainbow flag.

In October 2021, Lego Group launched a campaign called "Ready for Girls" as part of its celebration of the UN's International Day of the Girl. The company also announced its plan to remove gender stereotypes from the toys following a review of a study commissioned by the Geena Davis Institute on Gender in Media.

On 3 March 2022, during the 2022 Russian invasion of Ukraine, the Lego Foundation stated it would donate approximately US$16.5 million to organizations including UNICEF, Save the Children, and the Danish Red Cross for emergency relief efforts.

In April 2022, The Lego Foundation announced the launch of the company's $20 million play-based learning initiative. The grant programme, launched as part of Autism Acceptance Month, is in support of innovative play-based learning for developmentally challenged children and, in turn, will award funding to 25 enterprises in support of innovative learning for autistic children and children with ADHD.

In June 2025, The Lego Group launched the "She Built That" campaign. A song named after the campaign based on "It's Like That" by Run-DMC was released.

In November 2025, The Lego Group signed a multi-year partnership with F1 Academy, a female-only Formula 4–level single-seater racing championship founded by the Formula One Group. As part of the partnership, The Lego Group will support Dutch driver Esmee Kosterman from the 2026 F1 Academy season with a Lego-liveried car.

== Logos ==
Below are historical images of the Lego logo throughout the company's existence.

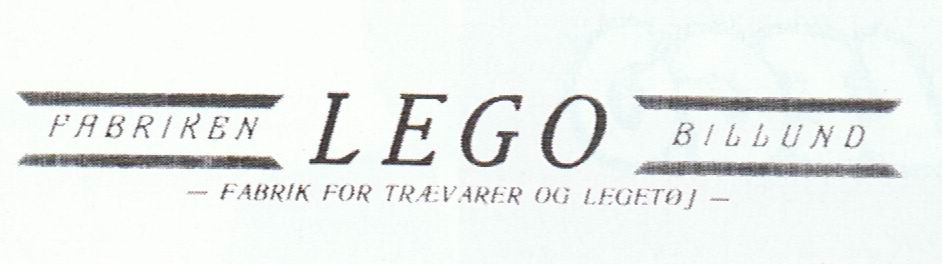
1936–1946

1948–1950

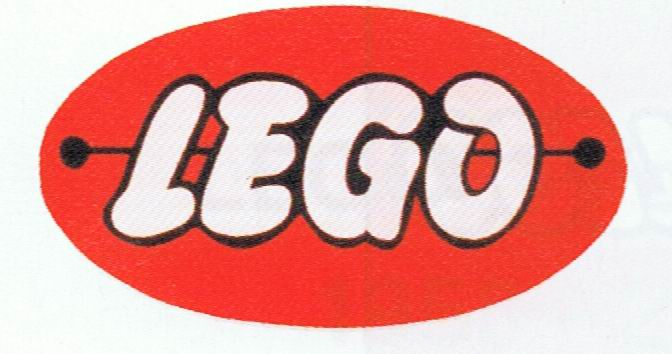
1953–1954

1954–1959

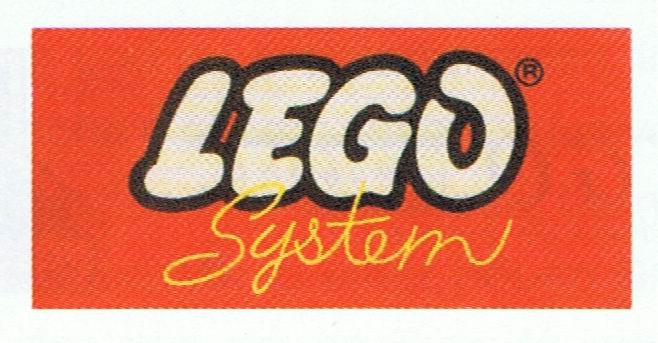
1959–1964

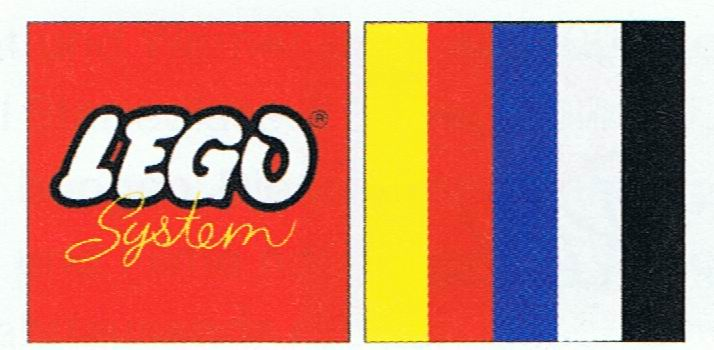
1964–1972

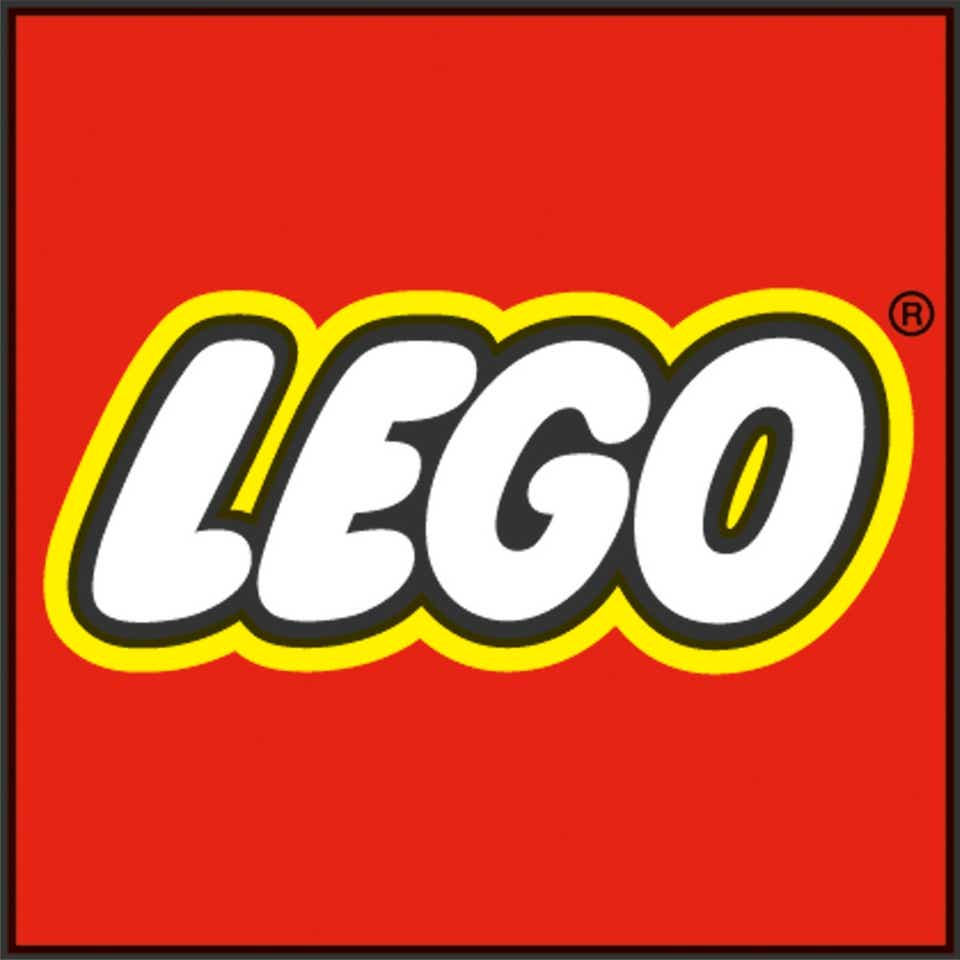
1972–1998

1998–present

== See also ==
- List of game manufacturers
- Fisher-Price
- Bandai
- Hasbro
- Mattel
- Spin Master
- MGA Entertainment
- TOMY
