= Ole Kirk Christiansen =

Founder of The Lego Group (1891–1958)

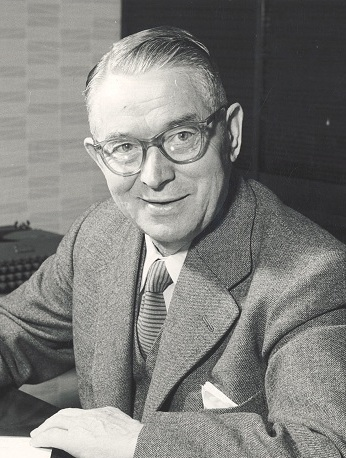
- Christiansen in 1957
- Born: 7 April 1891; Omvraa Mark, Filskov, Denmark
- Died: 11 March 1958 (aged 66); Billund, Denmark
- Resting place: Grene kirkegård, Billund, Denmark
- Occupations: Carpenter, Toy maker
- Known for: Founding the Lego Group
- Spouses: Kirstine Sörensen (m. 1916; died 1932) Sofie Jörgensen (m. 1934)
- Children: 5, including Godtfred

Ole Kirk Christiansen (born Ole Kirk Kristiansen; (Note: He was named Kristiansen on his birth certificate. He used both spellings, but used the name Christiansen more often.) 7 April 1891 – 11 March 1958) was a Danish carpenter and toy maker. In 1932, he founded the construction toy company Lego, later known as the Lego Group. Christiansen transformed his small woodworking shop, which initially sold household products, into a manufacturer of wooden toys. By 1934, he had officially named the company Lego and established its fundamental principles. The business shifted to producing plastic bricks after the acquisition of a plastic moulding injection machine in 1947. Following his death in 1958, the company's management was handed over to his son, Godtfred.

== Early years ==
Christiansen was born on 7 April 1891 in Omvraa Mark, Filskov, South Jutland, Denmark, which is 20 km northwest of Billund. He was one of 13 children of a farm labourer. His parents were Jens Niels Christiansen and Kirstine Christiansen. Although his family was poor, Christiansen was able to receive a basic high-school education. It was while he was working as a farmhand from the age of six that Christiansen developed a fascination with whittling wood, in between the two days per week that he attended school. In 1905, when Christiansen was 14, he began working as an apprentice for his older brother, Kristian Bonde Christiansen. In 1911, after his apprenticeship, he served in the military and studied at Haslev Technical School. After, he travelled abroad and went to work in carpentry in Germany and Norway before returning to Denmark.

== Wood-working business ==
In 1916, Christiansen returned to Denmark and settled in Billund. He bought a carpentry shop with the money he had saved and named it Billund Maskinsnedkeri og Tømreforretning (Billund Woodworking and Carpentry Shop). During the late 1920s, the business focused on restoring and developing new buildings and also producing household goods for the local community. In 1924, Christiansen's business was almost destroyed when his sons, Karl Georg and Godtfred, caused a fire to break out by accidentally setting fire to wood shavings in the workshop while trying to light a hot glue machine. Consequently, both the workshop and the family home burned down. Following this event, Christiansen decided to expand his business and employed an architect to build a larger workshop and family home. The construction of the house, which is situated on Hovedgaden in Billund, was completed in 1924 with two stone lions placed at its entrance. By 1930, Christiansen employed a small workforce to maintain his growing business.

== Family and personal life ==
While establishing his business, Christiansen met Kirstine Sörensen, the daughter of a local cheese-maker. They married in 1916 and had four children. Sörensen died in 1932 after the birth of their fourth child. Two years later, Christiansen married Sofie Jörgensen and they had one daughter. Christiansen was a member of the Church Association for the Inner Mission in Denmark.

== Beginnings of Lego ==
During the early 1930s, Christiansen's business was impacted by the onset of the Great Depression in Denmark. The drop in farming prices resulted in many of his customers being unable to afford his products. This decline in business forced Christiansen to lay off staff in early 1932 until only seven employees remained. The primary income, which was from sales of ladders and ironing boards, was shrinking in demand. Eventually, Christiansen had to dismiss his last worker. In order to sell more products, he made the decision to produce cheap wooden products, including wooden toys. With the business slipping into bankruptcy, he refused to stop producing toys when his siblings requested this as part of a bailout loan. He decided to officially found an unnamed company (later to become Lego) in 1932.

Christiansen's company moved primarily to the production of wooden toys, such as yo-yos, pull-along animals and trucks. He consequently decided to focus his products on the development of children. With this decision, Christiansen defined the core philosophy of the company, which was expressed in its name in 1934. Lego is a shortened form of the Danish word Leg godt, meaning "play well". The company eventually became known as The Lego Group. Years later, he said, "Not until the day when I said to myself, 'You must make a choice between carpentry and toys' did I find the real answer."

Christiansen made his toy products from birch wood that had been cut from the forest, dried out for two years and then dried in a kiln for three weeks. The toys were put together, sealed, sanded and primed before being painted with three coats of varnish. Although he struggled to sell his household products and wooden toys due to the poverty levels of people living in the local community, he continued to produce toys, sometimes exchanging them for food. By 1935, the toy range included a variety of animals, including a pull-along wooden duck, which has since seen numerous variations.

== 1940s and 1950s ==
Christiansen maintained his business through the Great Depression and Nazi Germany's occupation of Denmark in World War II. In 1942, the company experienced another setback. A short circuit created an electrical fire, which resulted in the loss of his factory and his entire stock and blueprints. Following this, he decided to start again out of a sense of responsibility towards his workforce. In 1944, his new factory now incorporated an assembly line.

At the end of World War II, many traditional materials used in the manufacture of products were not readily available, so manufacturers looked for other cheap, plastic alternatives. In 1947, the Lego company was the first toy manufacturer in Denmark to purchase a plastic injection moulding machine, which was so expensive that it cost more than twice the previous year's profits. This transition into producing plastic toys was challenging for Christiansen, as he had spent his life working with wood. By 1949, the business was producing a plastic product called the Automatic Binding Brick. In 1950, Christiansen's son Godtfred was named Junior Managing Director and the company spent the next decade focusing on the development of the plastic brick, which was modified from a self-locking building brick invented by Hilary Fisher Page. Despite poor sales in the early 1950s, the company eventually developed a plastic brick using acrylonitrile butadiene styrene (ABS), which was necessary for achieving the "clutch power" or friction that holds two bricks together. This design for the Lego brick was patented in Copenhagen on 28 January 1958.

== Death ==
On 11 March 1958, Christiansen experienced a cardiac arrest and died at the age of 66. His third son Godtfred took over the company until his death in 1995. Ole died just before his son used the Automatic Binding Brick as the basis for the company's "System of Play", which was the foundation of the modern Lego building toy.

== Legacy ==
Billund’s central square (Ole Kirks Plads) is named after Christiansen; the Lego House, which is located at this square, contains an exhibit commemorating Christiansen's legacy. In 1964, Ole Kirk's Foundation, a charitable foundation in Denmark was established in his memory. On 6 September 2023, Parco Ole Kirk Kristiansen, a park located in a northwest area of Rome was named after Christiansen in an official naming ceremony.
