= Lego Con =

Former virtual event hosted by Lego

- The logo for the event
- Genre: Lego
- Frequency: Annual
- Venue: Online
- Years active: 2
- Inaugurated: June 26, 2021; 5 years ago
- Most recent: June 18, 2022; 4 years ago
- Organiser: The Lego Group

Lego Con (stylised as LEGO CON) was a virtual event hosted by The Lego Group in 2021 and 2022. The content of it included interviews, polls, product reveals, and building challenges.

The event was livestreamed annually from the Lego House museum in Billund, Denmark during the month of June. In December 2022, it was announced that the convention would not return for 2023.
