= Architecture Studio (Lego) =

2013 Lego set

- Promotional image
- Type: Lego set
- Inception: August 1, 2013
- Manufacturer: The Lego Group
- Available: No

The Architecture Studio is a discontinued Lego set released in 2013. Part of the larger Lego Architecture line of sets, it was intended for older audiences and designed to demonstrate different methods and principles of architecture. The set included 1,210 white and transparent pieces and came with a guidebook created by architectural companies instead of a regular instruction manual. It was discontinued in 2017.

The set received divided reviews and inspired debate among architectural critics. Some praised the simplistic elements of the set, while others criticized it, believing it in fact limited creativity.

== Overview ==
The Architecture Studio, which the Lego Group said was designed to help builders "explore the ideas and principles of architecture", was part of the Lego Architecture product line, which was started by the company in 2008 and originally based on the work of artist Adam Reed Tucker. Sets in the theme are typically recreations of real-world buildings. The Architecture Studio set was intended for those aged 16 and over and contained 1,210 pieces, all either colored white or transparent. 76 unique types of parts are included in it. In the United States, the set was priced at $149.99, while in the United Kingdom, it was priced at £149.99.

Rather than an instruction manual for any specific build, it instead came with a guidebook with essays and tutorials teaching different architectural principles. The guidebook, which contained around 270 pages, was edited by Christopher Turner and written in collaboration with architectural firms MAD Architects, REX, SOM, Sou Fujimoto Architects, Safdie Architects, and Tham & Videgård Arkitekter. While the set was being developed, Danish architectural firm KRADS assisted the Lego Group with securing the companies to work on it. Ideas and techniques suggested in it include building sideways, creating designs at smaller scales while still representing larger buildings, and creating structures in smaller modules which can then be connected together. Topics such as mass, density, negative space, repetition, symmetry, and interiors are also discussed, with real-world buildings created by the firms used as examples.

Michael McNally, brand relations director at the Lego Group, stated that the set's use of white gave it a "sketchbook" feel that could represent different styles of architecture accurately, also noting that the uniqueness of a set featuring parts only in one color could give it more novelty for collectors. Although intended for adults, she believed the set could also be used by students seeking a career in architecture.

The set itself was designed by Lego Group employees Rok Zgalin Kobe and Steen Sig Andersen and was released in the United States on August 1, 2013. Before this, it was available early at Barnes & Noble stores, where it was the subject of community building events. The set later saw a wider release in the United Kingdom and Europe in August 2014.

The Architecture Studio was cited as an example of the company's increased focus on their community of adult fans as well as the use of Lego as an educational tool, and was available for over four years until it was discontinued in December 2017.

== Reception and analysis ==
Oliver Wainwright, writing for The Guardian, felt the set was "limiting" and did not "[encourage] any architectural investigation". He also called the book the set came with "jumbled" and "hastily edited". The Huffington Post called the set was "beautiful, fun and engaging", but also deemed it unnecessary and designed in a way that tried to distance itself from being a toy, stating its creative principles "[did not need] a 272-page book to explain". They also found the set to be overpriced. Both sources noted the product's lack of color was likely chosen to make it more for adults, although The Huffington Post described it as "philosophical". Jimmy Stamp, writing for the Smithsonian, admitted it was "a must-have for collectors", but was also critical of the set due to the more basic and professional style of it, which she believed limited creativity, stating it was "more text book than toy box".

In contrast to such criticism, Christopher Hawthorne, writing for the Los Angeles Times, found the set to be "closer in spirit" to older Lego sets, and spoke positively of its limited color scheme. Harry Wallop of The Daily Telegraph also spoke positively of the set, feeling that builds made with it "looked like professional models fit for a modern city", although like The Huffington Post, they also felt the set was overpriced. John Brownlee of Fast Company felt the book and its coverage of architecture was among the highlights of it, noting that it brought to mind "some of the funky, beautifully designed textbooks aimed at [...] kids in the 1970s and 1980s". He also reviewed the set itself positively, highlighting the different ways the set could be used and stating, "Lego has long turned imaginative kids into builders, but the Lego Architecture Studio is the set that will help turn those builders into the designers and architects of tomorrow". David Agrell of Popular Mechanics additionally wrote a positive review of the set, in particular highlighting its lack of regular instructions.

Queensland University of Technology professor Dan Hunter felt the set "hearkened back to the earliest days of Lego" and noted it could see genuine use from architects and architecture students. He also cited the use of the color white in the set as unique in that it did not resemble any specific building material. However, he noted that sets from the Architecture product line have previously been criticized for their prices when compared to other Lego themes, specifically those intended for children. Kyle Vanhemert of Wired found the set to be "a brilliant concept", stating that it "doesn't just encourage imagination but demands it." Unlike some other reviewers, he found the price of the set worth it due to the creativity he believed it could inspire, also noting the potential educational value.

Television personality Martha Stewart and artist Stefan Sagmeister both wrote brief reviews of the set for The New York Times Magazine. Both were mostly positive, with Stewart stating she found the set appealing due to her interest in contemporary architecture. Sagmeister, while also positive, admitted he "probably wouldn't buy the set himself".

James Haldane and Finn Williams, writing for The Architectural Review, debated the quality of the set, with Williams also hosting a promotional event for the set at a Lego Store in London. Haldane gave the set a negative review, arguing that it would have benefited from more color and was limited to "a narrow segment of twentieth-century modernism". In contrast, Williams argued the set brought the Lego brand back to its basics and that the simplicity of it would in fact inspire creativity.

== Usage ==
Kyle Vanhemert of Wired sent copies of the set to Snøhetta, SHoP Architects, and SOM to see what they would build with it. In response, all three architecture firms created special designs with the set, which included customized parts, as well as frozen and melted elements. SHoP Architects co-founder Gregg Pasquarelli built a model with customized bricks inspired by the Japanese architectural movement of Metabolism, while Snøhetta designed a tower created to balance with gravity, and SOM created a building frozen in a block of ice.

Designs using the set created by architectural firms and schools were displayed at a 2015 exhibition held at the Museum of Science and Industry in Chicago, Illinois featuring the work of Adam Reed Tucker. The sets were provided by the museum itself. Many of the creations in the 2015 book The Lego Architect by Tom Alphin, which features ideas for Lego builds made with different styles of architecture, can also be built using the set.

In 2022, the Architecture Studio set was used in a study by Istanbul Technical University about the use of virtual reality in architecture. The set was chosen due to the large inventory of parts it provided. Participants in the study were asked to design structures using parts from the set in real life, before designing similar ones in a virtual reality program. The study found that both resulted in similar design processes, although the ability for the user to change their scale when building virtually was considered to be beneficial.
