= Proteam =

Proteam may refer to:

- Proteam Motorsport, an Italian auto racing team.
- Proteam, a former Swedish educational company, acquired by Vittra.
- UCI ProTeam, a type of cycling team licensed to compete on the UCI World Tour
