= Lego Architecture =

Lego theme

- Sub‑themes: Landmark series Architect series Skyline series
- Subject: Buildings
- Availability: 2008–present
- Total sets: 67
- Official website

Lego Architecture is a Lego theme that aims to "celebrate the past, present and future of architecture through the Lego Brick". The brand includes a series of sets designed by "Architectural Artist" Adam Reed Tucker, and each contain the pieces and instructions to build a model of a famous architectural building or city skyline in micro-scale.

== Development ==
Adam Reed Tucker earned a degree in architecture at Kansas State University in 1996. While there, he sought a method to join his two passions of art and architecture, and hit upon the idea of using Lego bricks. From this, he founded Brickstructures, Inc., and began to design and build models of famous landmarks. His work was noticed by The Lego Group, and together they formed a partnership to release some of his models as commercially available Lego sets under the Lego Architecture brand.

== Architecture sets ==
According to BrickLink, The Lego Group has released 64 playsets as part of the Lego Architecture theme.

Sets in the product line contain a premium booklet, that, besides the build instructions, also includes various information and pictures of the building itself.

By the beginning of 2009, six sets had been released in the range, under two 'series'. Within the 'Landmark Series' are models of the Sears Tower (21000), John Hancock Center (21001), the Empire State Building (21002), and the Space Needle (21003). Within the 'Architect Series' are models of the Guggenheim Museum (21004) and Fallingwater (21005).

In the beginning of July 2010, a seventh set, the White House (21006), was released. An eighth set (21007) was released in November 2010: New York's Rockefeller Center. The ninth set (21009), Farnsworth House (Plano, Illinois), was released in April 2011. A tenth set (21008), The Burj Khalifa, was released in June 2011. The Willis Tower (21000) was also released in 2011, this kit was a re-issue of the original Sears Tower kit; the only change was the printed tile to reflect the building's renaming.

An eleventh and twelfth set, the Robie House (21010) and the Brandenburg Gate (21011) were released in September 2011.

In January 2012, it was announced that the next Architecture set would be 21012 Sydney Opera House. The set was released in March 2012.

In June 2012, Big Ben (21013) was released. In July 2012, the Namdaemun Gate (renamed Sungnyemun Gate) (21016) was released. In September 2012, the Villa Savoye (21014) was released. The Eames House (21015) and Glass House were scheduled and then canceled, as it never came out as a set. The company tried to add the Eames House in again with set number (21025), but nothing could be done to put it in production.

In June 2013, the Leaning Tower of Pisa (21015) was announced for the Lego Architecture series. Its set number (21015) replaced the original Eames House after it was canceled. United Nations Headquarters (21018) came out next. In October 2013, Marina Bay Sands and the Eiffel Tower were both announced.

Set	Series	Name	Location	Released	Number of pieces	Retired	Image
21000	Landmark	Sears Tower	(United States) Chicago	2008	69	2014	Lego Architecture Sears Tower
21000	Landmark	Willis Tower	(United States) Chicago	2011	69	2014	
21001	Landmark	John Hancock Center	(United States) Chicago	2008	69	2012	Lego Architecture John Hancock Center
21002	Landmark	Empire State Building	(United States) New York City	2009	77	2015	
21003	Landmark	Seattle Space Needle	(United States) Seattle	2009	57	2016	Lego Architecture Space Needle
21004	Architect	Solomon R. Guggenheim Museum	(United States) New York City	2009	208	2014	Lego Architecture Guggenheim
21005	Architect	Fallingwater	(United States) Mill Run, Pennsylvania	2009	811	2015	
21006	Architect	The White House	(United States) Washington, D.C.	2010	560	2017	Lego Architecture White House
21007	Architect	Rockefeller Center	(United States) New York City	2010	240	2014	Lego Architecture Rockefeller Center
21008	Landmark	Burj Khalifa	(United Arab Emirates) Dubai	2011	208	2014	
21009	Architect	Farnsworth House	(United States) Plano, Illinois	2011	546	2015	Lego Architecture Farnsworth House
21010	Architect	Robie House	(United States) Chicago	2011	2,276	2014	Lego Architecture Robie House
21011	Landmark	Brandenburg Gate	(Germany) Berlin	2011	363	2016	Lego Architecture Brandenburg Gate
21012	Architect	Sydney Opera House	(Australia) Sydney	2012	270	2015	Lego Architecture Sydney Opera House
21013	Landmark	Big Ben	(United Kingdom) London	2012	346	2017	Lego Architecture Big Ben
21014	Architect	Villa Savoye	(France) Paris	2012	660	2016	Lego Architecture Villa Savoye
21015	Landmark	The Leaning Tower of Pisa	(Italy) Pisa	2013	345	2016	Lego Architecture Leaning Tower of Pisa
21016	Landmark	Sungnyemun	(South Korea) Seoul	2012	325	2014	Lego Architecture Sungnyemun
21017	Architect	Imperial Hotel	(Japan) Tokyo	2013	1,188	2016	Lego Architecture Imperial Hotel
21018	Landmark	United Nations Headquarters	(United States) New York City	2013	597	2016	Lego Architecture United Nations
21019	Landmark	The Eiffel Tower	(France) Paris	2014	321	2019	Lego Architecture Eiffel Tower
21020	Landmark	Trevi Fountain	(Italy) Rome	2014	731	2017	Lego Architecture Trevi Fountain
21021 (limited edition)	Landmark	Marina Bay Sands	Singapore	2014	602	2016	
21022	Landmark	Lincoln Memorial	(United States) Washington, D.C.	2015	274	2017	
21023	Landmark	Flatiron Building	(United States) New York City	2015	471	2017	
21024	Landmark	Louvre	(France) Paris	2015	695	2019	Lego Architecture Louvre
21025	Architect	Eames House	(United States) Los Angeles			Never released	
21026	Skyline	Venice	Italy	2016	212	2018	Lego Architecture Venice
21027	Skyline	Berlin	Germany	2016	289	2018	Lego Architecture Berlin
21028	Skyline	New York City	United States	2016	598	2025	Lego Architecture New York City
21029	Landmark	Buckingham Palace	(United Kingdom) London	2016	780	2019	
21030	Landmark	United States Capitol Building	(United States) Washington, D.C.	2016	1,032	2020	Lego Architecture U.S. Capitol
21031	Landmark	Burj Khalifa	(United Arab Emirates) Dubai	2016	333	2018	
21032	Skyline	Sydney	Australia	2017	361	2019	Lego Architecture Sydney
21033	Skyline	Chicago	United States	2017	444	2019	Lego Architecture Chicago
21034	Skyline	London	United Kingdom	2017	468	-	Lego Architecture London
21035	Landmark	Solomon R. Guggenheim Museum	(United States) New York City	2017	744	2019	
21036	Landmark	Arc de Triomphe	(France) Paris	2017	386	2019	
21037 (Lego House exclusive)	Landmark	Lego House	Billund, Denmark	2017	774	2020	Lego Architecture Lego House
21038	Skyline	Las Vegas	United States	2018	487	Replaced (Note: Due to the 2017 Mandalay Bay hotel massacre, the Mandalay Bay was replaced by Bellagio and released as set #21047.)	
21039	Skyline	Shanghai	China	2018	597	2021	Lego Architecture Shanghai
21041	Landmark	Great Wall of China	China	2018	551	2020	Lego Architecture Great Wall of China
21042	Landmark	Statue of Liberty	(United States) New York City	2018	1,685	-	Lego Architecture Statue of Liberty
21043	Skyline	San Francisco	United States	2019	565	2021	Lego Architecture San Francisco
21044	Skyline	Paris	France	2019	649	2025	Lego Architecture Paris
21045	Landmark	Trafalgar Square	(United Kingdom) London	2019	1,197	2022	Lego Architecture Trafalgar Square
21046	Landmark	Empire State Building	(United States) New York City	2019	1,767	2022	Lego Architecture Empire State Building
21047	Skyline	Las Vegas	United States	2018	501	2021	Lego Architecture Las Vegas
21050		Studio	—N/a	2013	1,210	2017	
21051	Skyline	Tokyo	Japan	2020	547	2022	Lego Architecture Tokyo
21052	Skyline	Dubai	United Arab Emirates	2020	740	2022	Lego Architecture Dubai
21054	Landmark	The White House	(United States) Washington, D.C.	2020	1,483	2023	Lego Architecture White House 2
21055 (European markets only)	Landmark	Burj Khalifa	(United Arab Emirates) Dubai	2019	333	2022 (Note: not retired in UAE)	
21056	Landmark	Taj Mahal	(India) Agra	2021	2,022	2024	Lego Architecture Taj Mahal
21057	Skyline	Singapore	Singapore	2022	827	2024	
21058	Landmark	Great Pyramid of Giza	(Egypt) Cairo	2022	1,476	-	Lego Architecture Great Pyramid of Giza
21060	Landmark	Himeji Castle	(Japan) Himeji	2023	2,125	-	Lego Himeji Castle Architecture 21060
21061	Landmark	Notre-Dame de Paris	(France) Paris	2024	4,383	-	Lego_Notre-Dame_De_Paris_21061
21062	Landmark	Trevi Fountain	(Italy) Rome	2025	1,880	-	
21063	Landmark	Neuschwanstein Castle	Germany	2025	3,455	-	LEGO Neuschwanstein Castle build
21064	Skyline	Paris – City of Love	(France) Paris	2025	958	-	
21065	Landmark	Sagrada Família	(Spain) Barcelona	2026	12,060	-	
21066	Skyline	New York City – The Big Apple	(United States) New York City	2026	1,435	-	
21067	Landmark	Tower Bridge	(United Kingdom) London	2026	3,745	-	

Special editions
Set	Name	Location	Released	Number of pieces	Comments	Image
4000002	LOM Moulding	(Mexico) Monterrey	2011	174	Given to employees.	
4000005	KOM Moulding	Billund, Denmark	2012	315	Given to employees. Kornmarken Factory is the first and largest Lego moulding and production factory.	
4000006	Kladno Campus	(Czech Republic) Kladno	2012	250	Given to employees.	
4000009	HMV Production	Billund, Denmark	2013	285	Given to employees. HMV is the name of the packing factory at Lego Billund, which this set is based on.	
4000010	LEGO House	Billund, Denmark	2014	250	Only sold at the Lego House in Billund. Lego House opened in Billund in 2017.	Lego House
4000011	Nyíregyháza Factory	(Hungary) Nyíregyháza	2014	327	Given to employees. Lego model of the Nyíregyháza Factory.	
4000015	LOM Moulding B	(Mexico) Monterrey	2014	215	Given to employees. Additional packing building, which expands the footprint of the existing facility.	
4000016	Billund Airport	Billund, Denmark	2014	281	Only sold at Billund Airport. This set was made for the 50th anniversary of the Airport.	
4000018	Kladno Campus	(Czech Republic) Kladno	2015	412	Given to employees. Kladno campus is the name of building C at the Czech Lego factory, which this set is based on.	
4000023	Jiaxing Factory	(mainland China) China	2016	407	Given to employees. Set of the Lego factory in Jiaxing, China.	
40199	Billund Airport	Billund, Denmark	2018	286	Only sold at Billund Airport. New edition from 4000016, only 10,000 units sold, no longer available.	
4000038	Lego Campus	Billund, Denmark	2022	1,494	Given to employees. Released to celebrate the grand opening of the Lego Campus on April 5, 2022.	

== Impact ==
The product range has been reviewed favorably by many commentators. Journalist Jenny Williams said "The scale on these kits is pretty small, though, so don't expect exquisite detail. But creating with Lego bricks is quite a fun way to pay homage to great architects".

== In popular media ==
A near-exact replica of set 21006, The White House, appears in the eight story arc of the Japanese manga series JoJo's Bizarre Adventure, JoJolion, where it used by the villain character Poor Tom to activate his "stand" power, "Ozon Baby".
