= Lalandia =

Holiday resort chain in Denmark

Lalandia is the name of three Danish holiday resorts owned by Parken Sport & Entertainment. The original Lalandia Rødby is located in Rødbyhavn, with additional activity centres in Billund (2009) and Søndervig (2022).

== Lalandia Rødby ==
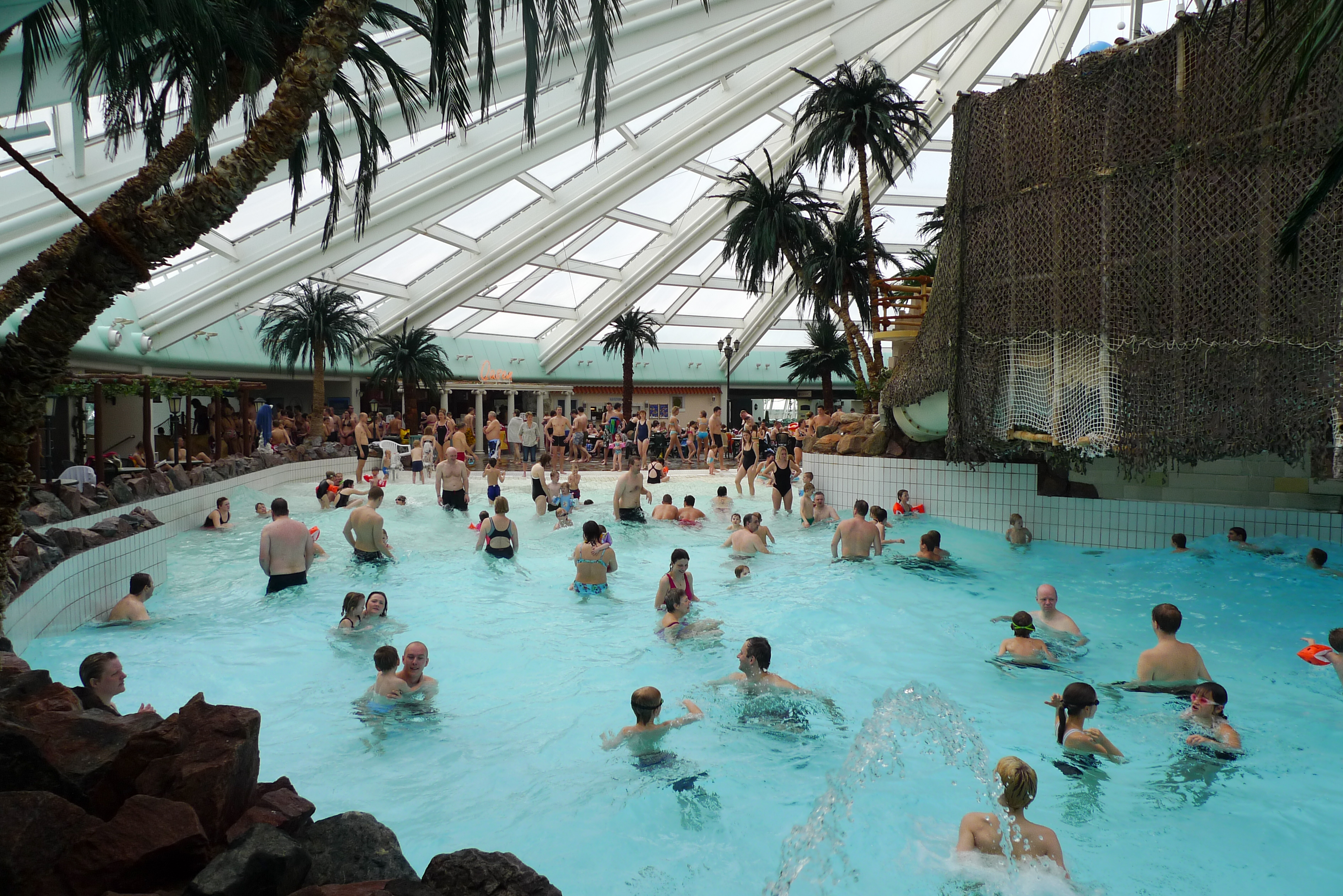
Pool at Lalandia Rødby in 2009

Lalandia Rødby mainly consists of a giant indoor water park, with four body slides and a wild river. The Aquadome is the major focal point of Lalandia where children and adults can participate in many water activities in 7,400 m^{2} of heated pools. There are three large indoor pools for swimming and water play. One of the pools, the Wave Pool, produces waves once an hour for the enjoyment of bathers. Other activities include: soccer, indoor skating, miniature golf, badminton, tennis and other sport activities. In July 2013, the Aquadome Lalandia Rødby was listed as Denmark's tenth most popular attraction with 512,000 visitors in 2012. Lalandia Billund came in sixth with 620,000 visitors.

=== History ===
Lalandia Rødby was established in 1988 in Rødby. Since the establishment it has been expanded several times with more vacation houses. Lalandia is named after the island of Lolland in Denmark on which it is situated.

== Lalandia Billund ==
Lalandia Billund opened on 24 April 2009. The Lalandia Aquadome in Billund is Scandinavia's largest waterpark measuring 10,000 m^{2}. The water slides include "Tornado" that uses 4-person dinghies, head-first racing "Octopus Racers" and 102-metre "Twister".

== Lalandia Søndervig ==
Lalandia Søndervig opened in 2022 with an Aquadome and other attractions.
