= Billund railway line =

Planned railway line in Denmark

Overview
- Status: Cancelled
- Locale: Billund, Denmark
- Termini: Jelling; Billund
- Stations: 3
- Website: www.bane.dk/Borger/Baneprojekter/Kommende-baneprojekter/Ny-bane-til-Billund

Service
- Type: Passenger rail
- System: Banedanmark

History
- Opened: 2023

Technical
- Line length: 19 km (12 mi)
- Character: single track
- Track gauge: 1,435 mm (4 ft 8 1/2 in) standard gauge
- Operating speed: 120 km/h (75 mph)

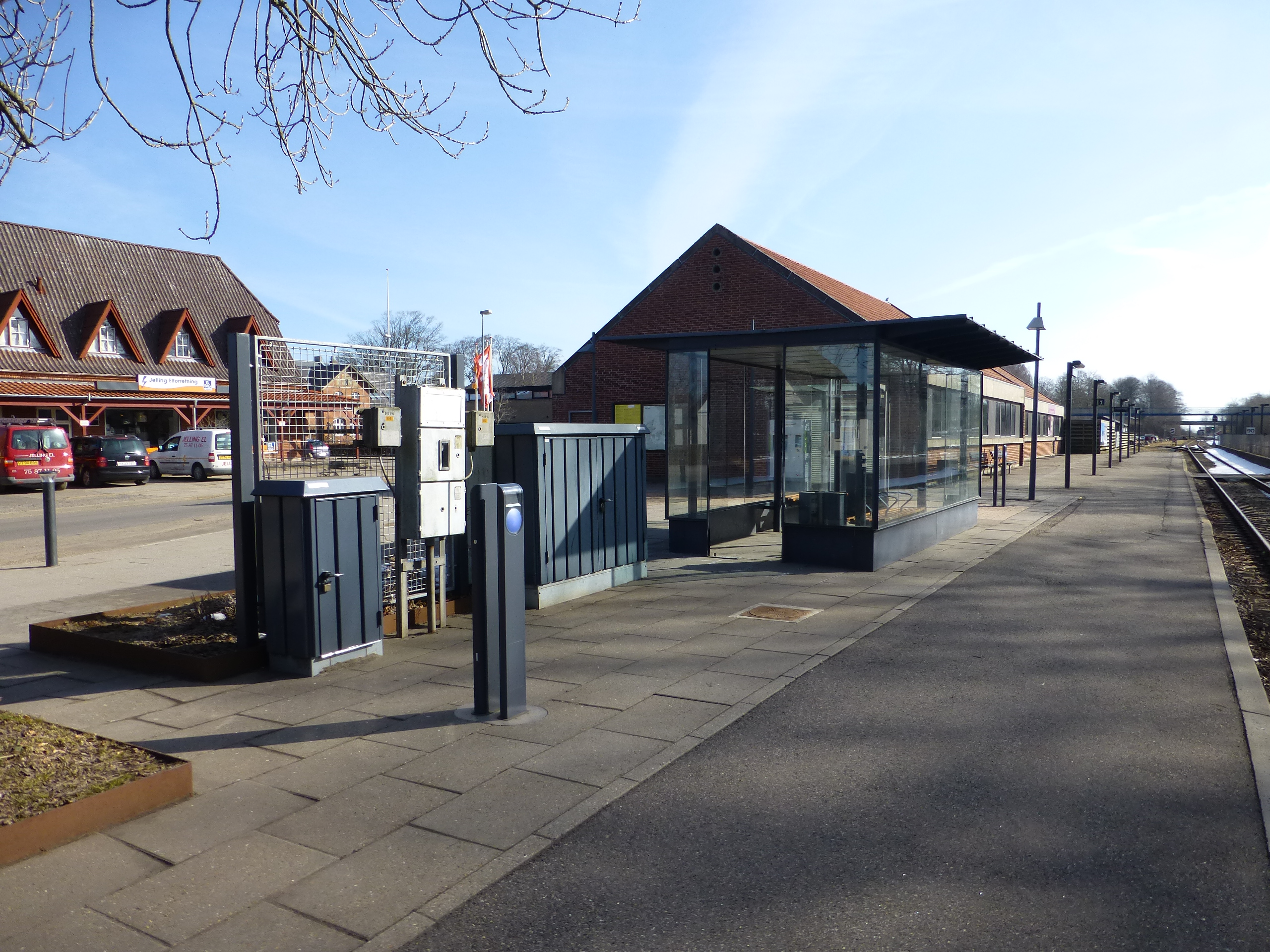
Jelling station, on the proposed Billund line

The Billund railway line was a planned railway line of 19 km to connect the existing Danish rail network at Jelling to Billund Airport and Billund itself to cater to the Legoland resort there.

== Background ==
In 2014 planning of the line was agreed, with a projected cost of 734 million DKK. The planned opening of the line was estimated to be 2020. However, in 2021, the Danish government cancelled the project.
