= Line Bonde =

First Danish female fighter pilot

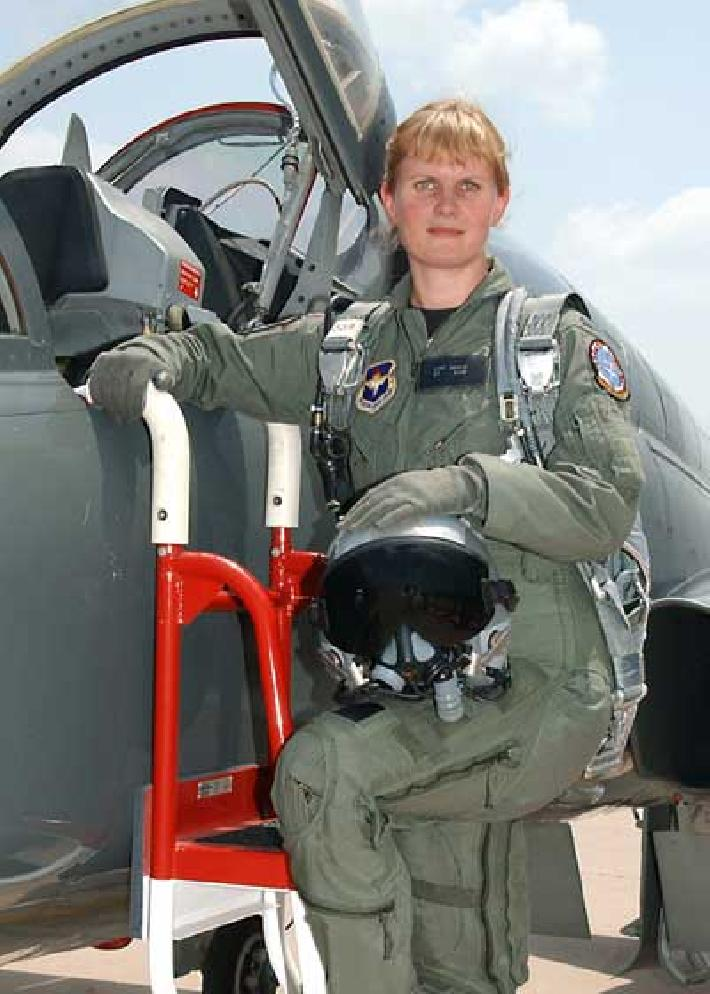
- Born: c. 1979 (age 46–47); Denmark
- Military career
- Allegiance: Denmark
- Branch: Royal Danish Air Force
- Nickname: INE

Line Bonde (born c.1979) is a Danish fighter pilot. In July 2006, aged 27, she became the first female Danish fighter pilot, flying an F-16 jet fighter.

== Biography ==
Bonde was brought up in Billund, Jylland, in a traditional Danish family where her father was the main salary earner while her mother worked half-time and took care of the home and her two daughters. While at school, she was a powerful swimmer, later becoming one of the best in Denmark. But swimming was not enough for her. Once she took part in a trial flight in a Danish Air Force Hercules, she knew she was destined to become a pilot.

She failed her first test, not because of the physical or theoretical aspects but simply because the examining psychologist thought she knew too little about flying. She returned a year later, completing basic training in flying in 2002. She then spent two years at officers school followed by 16 months in the United States where she earned her wings after completing a course at the Sheppard Air Force Base under the EURO-NATO Joint Jet Pilot Training programme. At the beginning of 2006, she returned to Denmark to serve at the Fighter Wing Skrydstrup air force base.
