= Rosan Bosch =

Dutch artist and designer

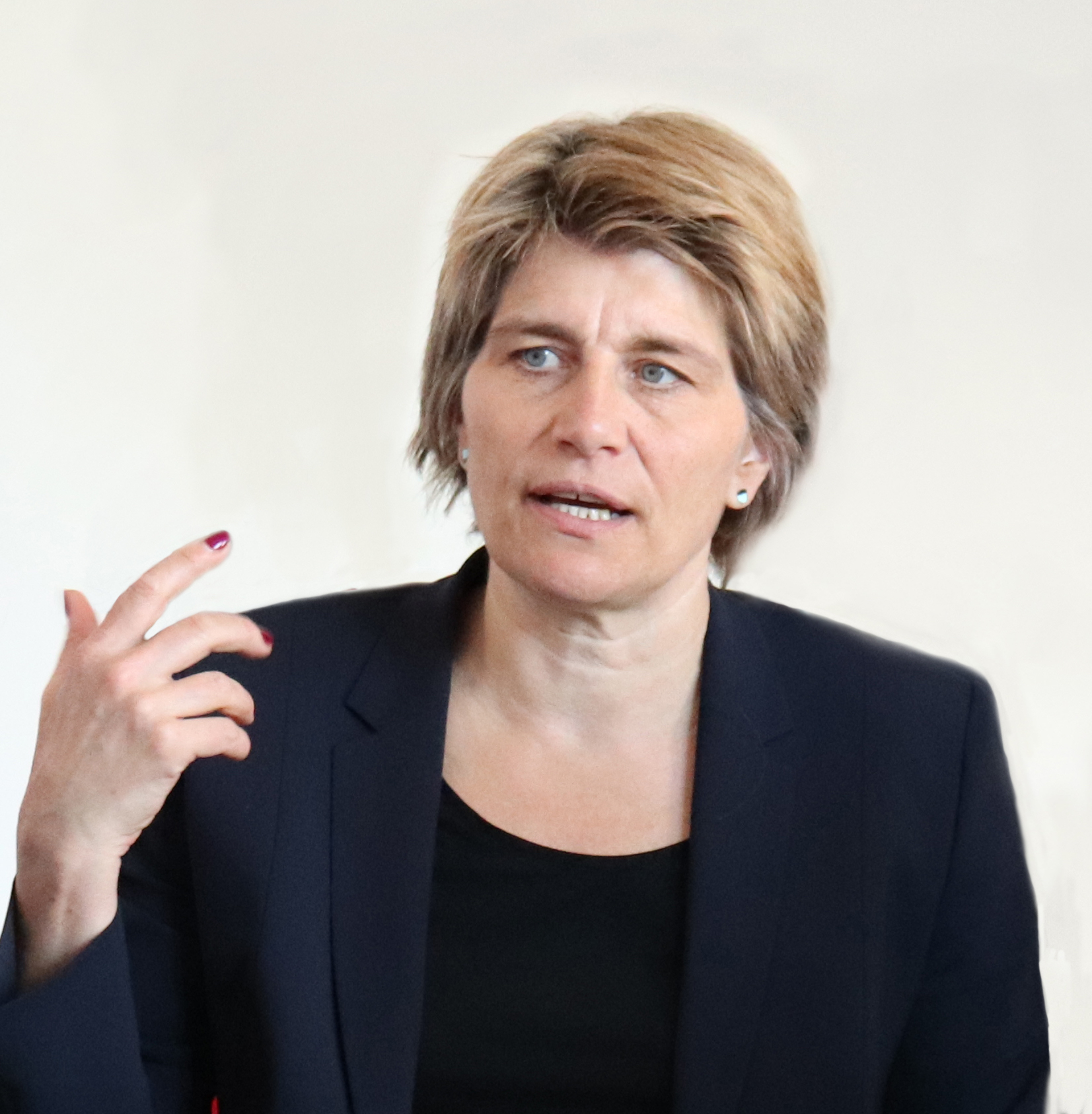
Rosan Bosch speaking at Harvard Graduate School of Education

Rosan Bosch (born 1969) is the founder and creative director of Rosan Bosch Studio in Copenhagen, Denmark. She designed the Swedish Vittra school at Telefonplan, as well as learning environments for Sheikh Zayed Private Academy in Abu Dhabi, the IB school Western Academy of Beijing in China, and Liceo Europa in Spain.

== Biography ==
Rosan Bosch studied at Hogeschool voor de Kunsten, Utrecht, Holland from 1987 to 1992 and took courses from the Facultat de Belles Art at Universitat de Barcelona, Spain. She worked as a contemporary artist for almost 10 years before founding the design studio Bosch & Fjord in 2001. She founded her current design practice, the Copenhagen-based Rosan Bosch Studio, in 2010.

=== Design of learning environments ===
Rosan Bosch's work is characterized by an untraditional approach to the design of schools. Based on six principles, the learning spaces support different ways of learning, working and communicating in an open and shared school space. The sculptural design installations help to direct the interaction and concentration of the students for teamwork, presentations, individual work, creative hands-on tasks or informal learning in the student community.

This methodology attempts to prioritize the learning needs of students in the development of school spaces.

The design of the Swedish Vittra schools is intended as an alternative to conventional school spaces. Instead of classrooms, large toy-like furnishings act as spatial divisions that support flexibility in learning and creative student activities.

=== Public speaker and advisor ===
Bosch is a public speaker and visiting lecturer at educational forums such as the UNESCO forum on education in Mexico, Harvard Graduate School of Education, TEDxIndianapolis and Aprendemos Juntos by El Pais. As advisor to the Ministry of Education in Argentina, her studio has developed guidelines for redesigns of the 22,000 secondary schools as part of a national school reform

=== Other design work ===
Bosch has also created designs for libraries, hospitals, workspaces and exhibitions, such as LEGO PMD, the children hospital BørneRiget at Rigshospitalet, VELUX and The Children's Library in Billund.

== Notable Projects ==
- BS KA school Zottegem, Belgium (to be completed)
- St. Andrew's Scots School, Argentina (2019)
- Western Academy of Beijing, China (2019)
- Buddinge School, Denmark (2019)
- Glasir – Tórshavn College, Tórshavn, Faroe Islands (2018)
- VELUX Collection, Østbirk, Denmark (2018)
- Liceo Europa, Zaragoza, Spain (2016)
- The Children's library in Billund, Billund, Denmark (2016)
- Cultural Island, Middelfart, Denmark (2016)
- VILLUM Window Collection, Søborg, Denmark (2015)
- Sheikh Zayed Private Academy, Abu Dhabi (2015)
- Vittra Södermalm School, Stockholm, Sverige (2012)
- Bornholms Efterskole, Rønne, Denmark (2013)
- Vittra Telefonplan School, Stockholm, Sverige (2011)
- LEGO PMD, Billund, Denmark (2010)
