= Billund, Denmark =

Town in Southern Denmark

Billund
- Town
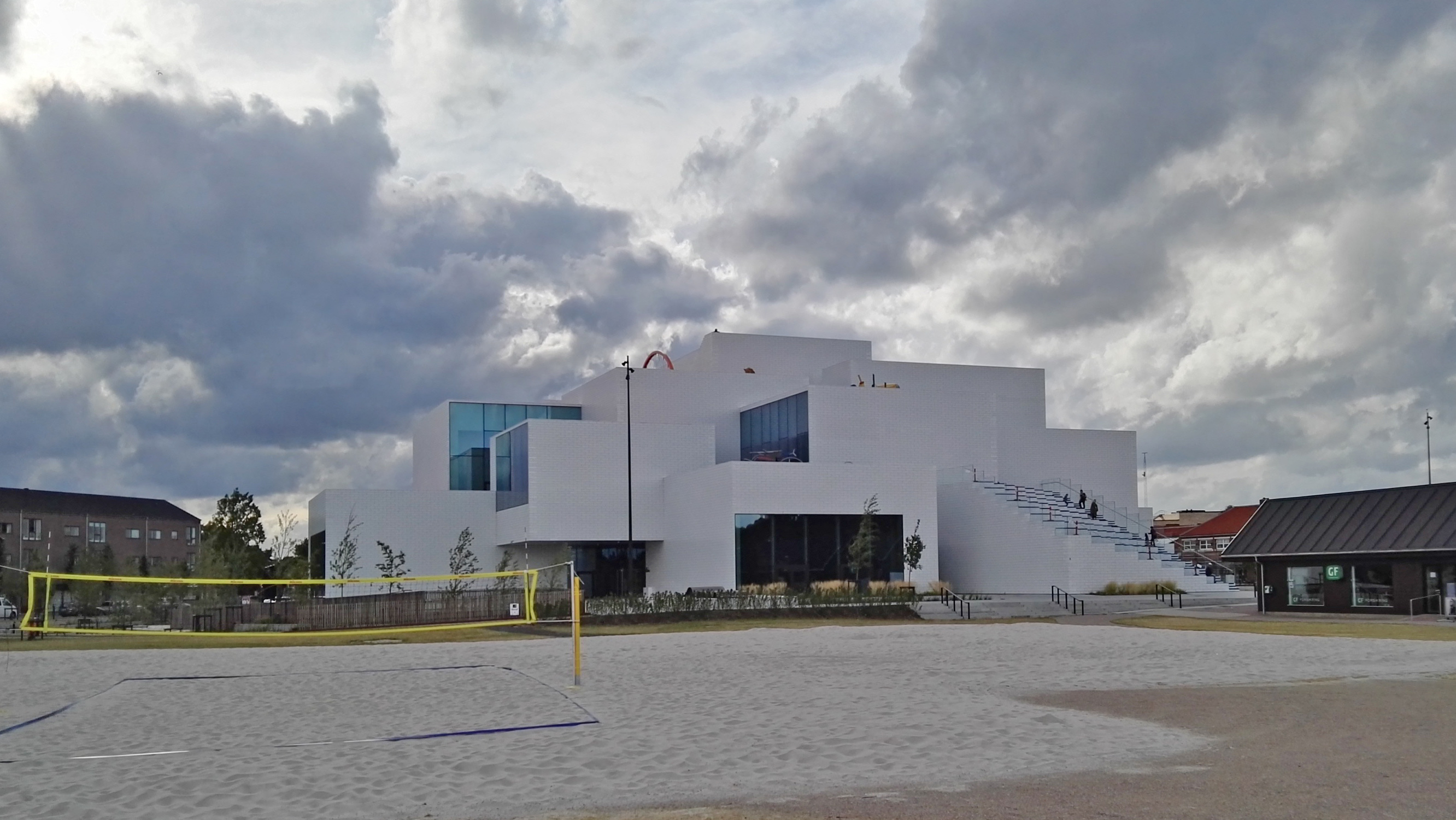
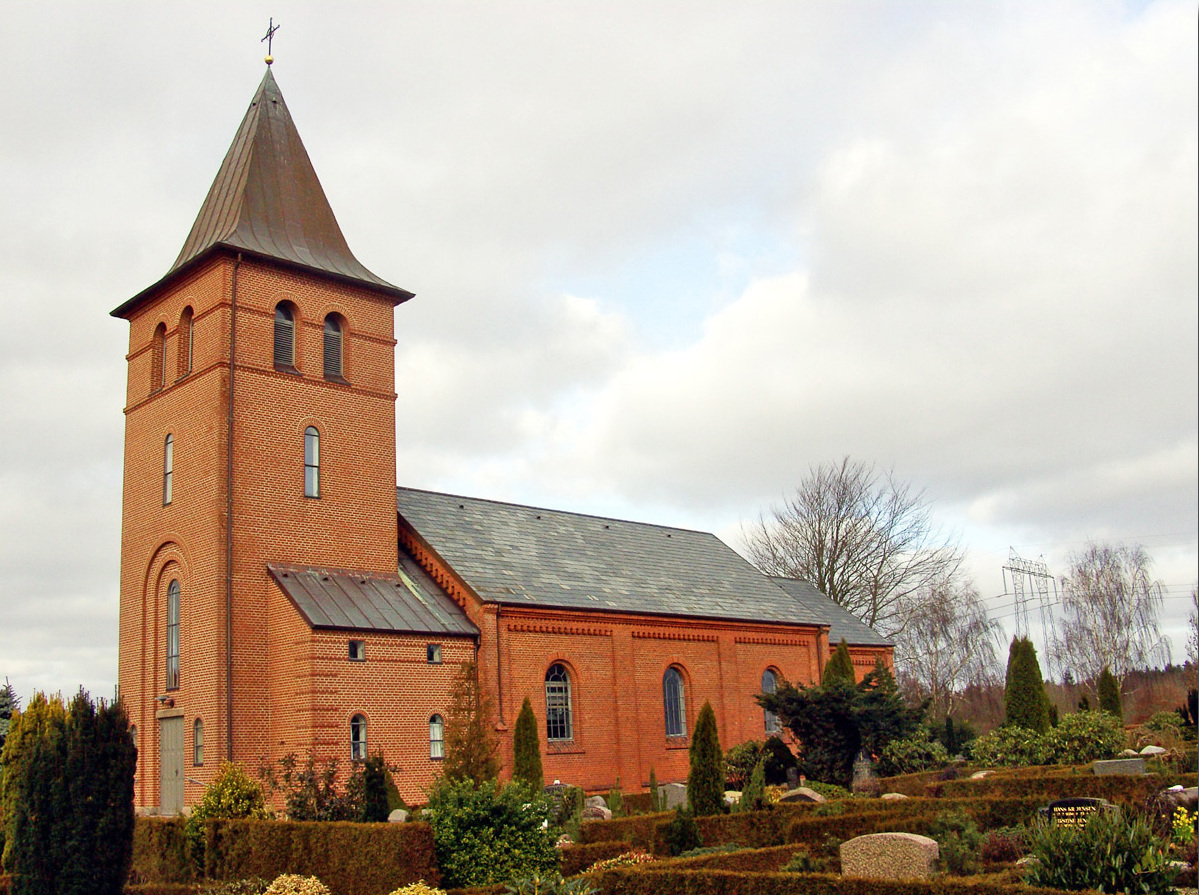
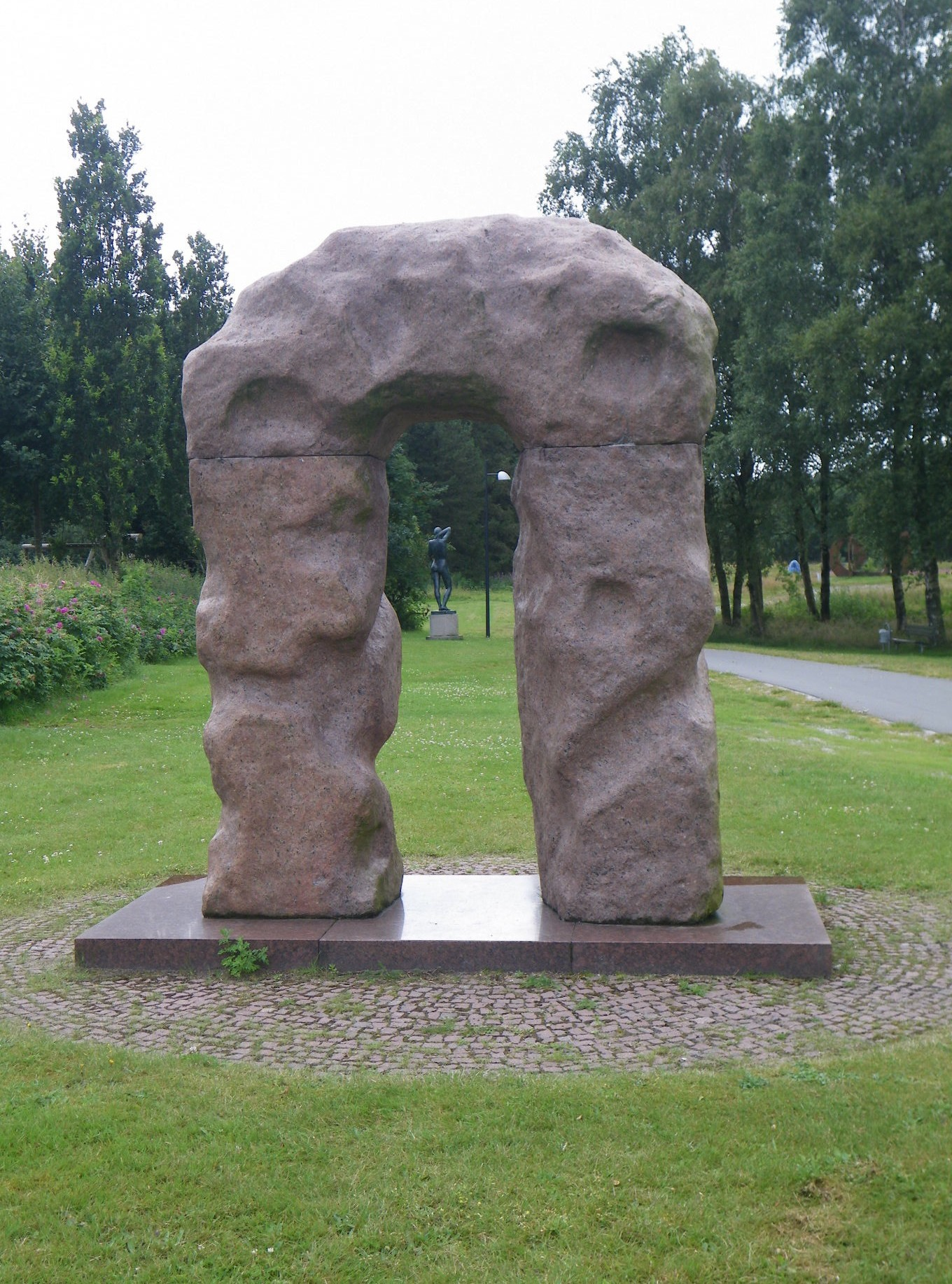
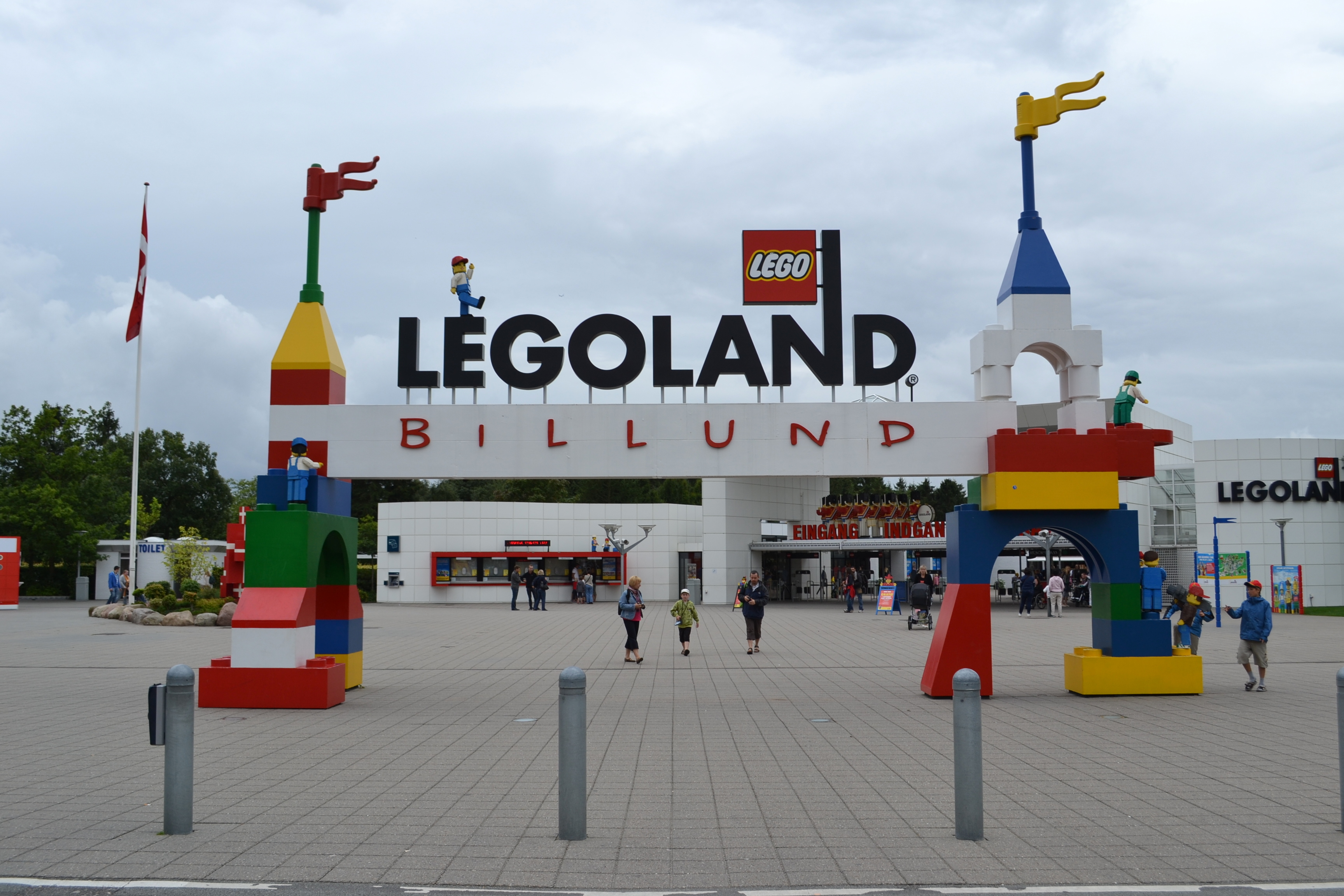
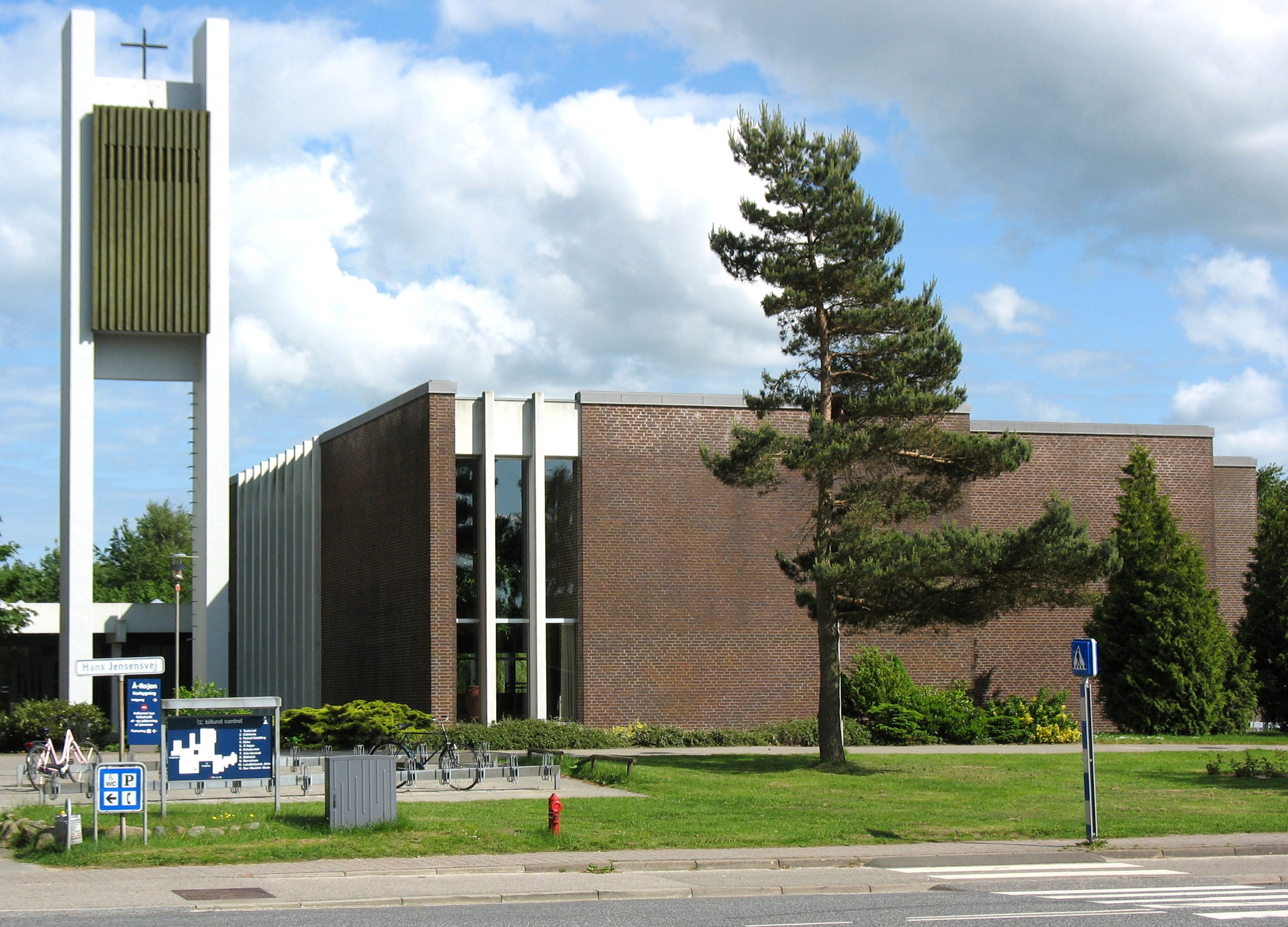
- Clockwise from top: Lego House, "Entrance" by Niels Peter Bruun Nielsen, Billund Church, Legoland Billund, Grene Church

- Location in Denmark Billund (Region of Southern Denmark)
- Coordinates: 55°43′51″N 9°6′55″E
- Country: Denmark
- Region: Southern Denmark
- Municipality: Billund
- Founded: 17th century

Area
  - Urban: 8.6 km^{2} (3.3 sq mi)

Population (2026)
  - Urban: 7,446
  - Urban density: 870/km^{2} (2,200/sq mi)
  - Gender: 3,728 males; 3,718 females
- Time zone: UTC+1 (CET)
  - Summer (DST): UTC+2 (CEST)
- Postal code: DK-7190 Billund

Billund (Danish pronunciation: [ˈpiˌlɔnˀ]) is a town in Jutland, Denmark. With a population of 7,446 (as of 1 January 2026), Billund is the second largest town in Billund Municipality, behind the municipal seat of Grindsted. It is located approximately 13 kilometers (8.1 miles) east of Grindsted and 27 kilometers (17 miles) west of Vejle.

Billund is the home of the Lego Group's head office. The town's economy developed from the 1930s when the Lego factory was established. In the 1960s, Billund grew rapidly, driven by the success of the company and the opening of Billund Airport, which is the second largest airport in Denmark.

Located in the town is the first Legoland theme park, Legoland Billund Resort, which opened in 1968 and attracts two million tourists per year. Other tourist attractions include Lalandia, the largest water park in Scandinavia, Wow Park, an outdoors park featuring Denmark's longest freefall slide, and an experience centre named Lego House.

== History ==
Billund has long been part of the parish of Grene Kirke ("Grove Church") whose original Romanesque building was first mentioned in 1291. The town's name was first mentioned as "Byllundt" in 1454 and later as "Billund" in 1510 and "Billundt" in 1610. The name combines the words bee and grove, meaning a grove with bees.

In the mid-19th century, Billund consisted of just eight farms. One building incorporated an inn and a grocery store. By 1875, a blacksmith had been introduced. The town continued to develop with the establishment of a cooperative dairy in 1888 and a utility association in 1894.

In 1880, the town's first windmill was built on the road between Vejle and Varde. In 1895, the mill burned to the ground but was rebuilt in 1897, this time in the style of Dutch windmills.

In the early 20th century, the town's infrastructure was further developed with the establishment of a telephone line from Vejle in 1902 and an electricity plant in 1917. A road was built through the town and a railway line was built from Vejle to Billund and later extended to Grindsted in 1914.

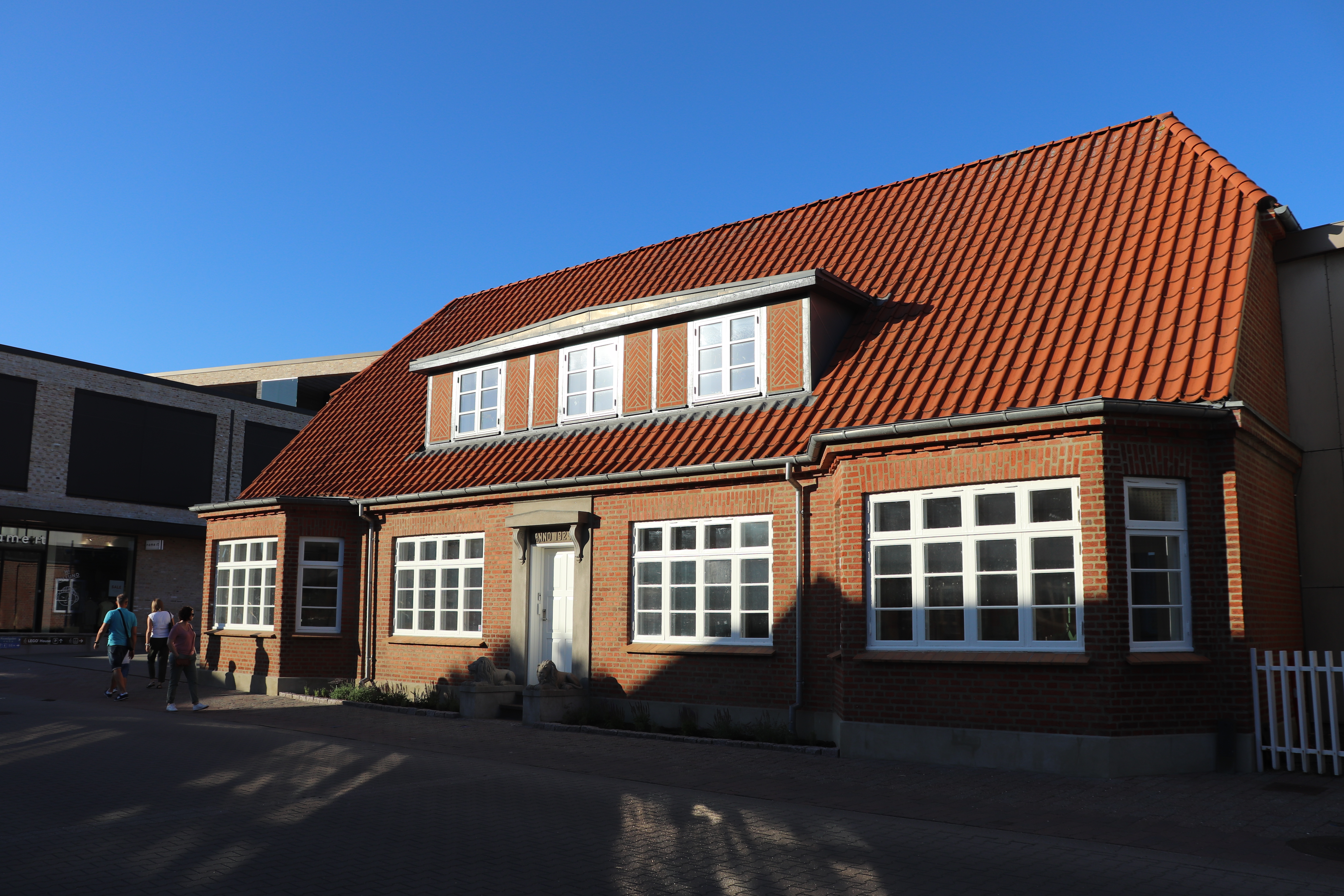
Family home of Ole Kirk Christiansen on Hovedgaden

In 1916, Ole Kirk Christiansen, who later founded The Lego Group, bought Billund Machine Joinery and Carpentry Business from master carpenter Steffen Pedersen, who had originally founded it in 1895. The business constructed houses during the summer and produced furniture in the winter. He invested in the town, creating a new dairy and the Skjoldbjerg church a few miles south of town.

In 1924, after his house and workshop burned down, Kirk Christiansen built a house at Hovedgaden in Billund with two stone lions placed at the entrance. Due to the impact of the Great Depression, people in the town were unable to afford to build houses, so in 1932, he began producing utility items such as ironing boards, stepladders and miniature toys. The toys became the main product of the business and in 1934, he named the toy factory "Lego".

In the late 1930s Billund experienced growth due to the factories and began to build waterworks, a gymnasium, and the town hall, though the local power station was closed and relocated.

In 1942, during the Nazi German occupation of Denmark in World War II, the old Lego factory was destroyed by fire, but a new one was immediately erected. In 1946, the railway track from Grindsted was extended to the Lego factory. In the same year, the Lego company purchased a plastic moulding machine from an English company. Plastic Lego bricks were first released from the factory in 1949 and near the end of the 1950s wooden toys had fallen out of favour.

The 1950s saw a continued growth in the town's population, which had risen from 249 residents in 1930 to 418 by 1950. This growth resulted in further expansion of the town with the construction of detached houses. In addition, Billund Housing Association was founded and, in 1953, created the first affordable housing on Ole Kirks Vej and Tværvej. In 1957, the railway station was closed.

In 1961, the old village school was expanded by joining it with a modern school building to form Billund School. In 1964, Billund Airport was inaugurated and opened to the public. It had been originally built as a private airfield by Lego.

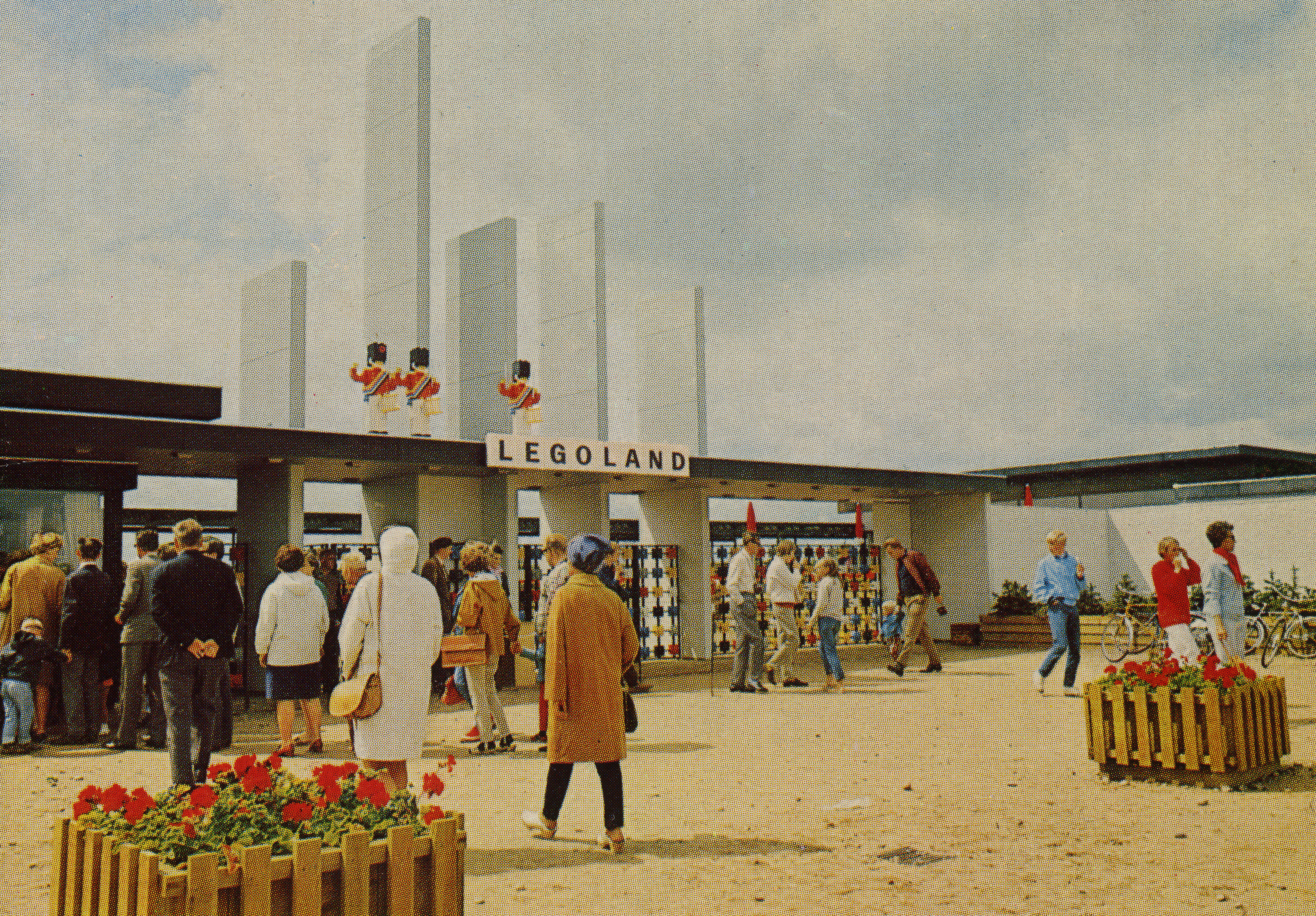
The main entrance of Legoland Billund in 1968

Legoland Billund opened on 7 June 1968 and received 3,000 visitors on its opening day and 625,000 in its first year. It was the only Legoland until 1996, when other Legoland theme parks were built in Carlsbad, California, and Günzburg, Germany. The Esso Motor Hotel, which is now the Legoland Hotel, was designed by Ole Hagens Tegnestue and built in 1968.

Between 1970 and 2006, Billund's population rose sharply to 6,020, driven by production at the Lego factories and offices and by the increasing number of tourist hotels. Several companies in the aviation industry also opened.

In 2010, a partnership of organisations that began with the Lego Foundation and the municipal government founded the Capital of Children, which provides opportunities for children to participate in community projects and holds an annual Children's General Assembly. In 2020, Billund was the first town in Denmark to be designated as a UNICEF Child Friendly City, which demonstrates a commitment to the UN Convention on the Rights of the Child.

== Geography ==
Billund is located approximately 13 kilometers (8.1 miles) from Grindsted, 56 kilometers (35 miles) from Esbjerg, and 27 kilometers (17 miles) from Vejle.

Billund Brook runs through the centre of Billund, starting as a small ditch in the westernmost side of Randbøl parish, and continuing west to Grindsted and Varde. The local terrain is mainly flat with sandy soil. To the south-west of Billund is Grene Sand, where inland sand dunes deposited sand onto nearby fields in stormy weather, requiring hedgerows to be planted. Local bogs were used to obtain peat as a source of fuel from ancient times. Local farmers practised heath farming, growing rye to produce bread. To the east and north of Billund, the moors fed large flocks of sheep, which were under attack from wolves, until the last wolf was shot in 1813. As conditions were excellent for beekeeping, beehives producing honey were documented in the fields in the 1650s and 1660s. Beekeeping declined with increasing cultivation of the land by local farmers.

== Demographics ==
As of August 2022, Billund had 6742 residents. The town has experienced growth due to recent rapid development. Billund Municipality grew to 27,016 in the same month, which was an increase from 26,133 recorded in 2007.

In the Middle Ages, the region was sparsely populated and centred around five or six parish churches that were built in the 12th century. There was no significant development in the population until towards the end of the Middle Ages. Near the end of the 15th century and at the beginning of the 16th century, several small settlements appeared across the municipality, including Billund.

A period of population growth in the 16th century was followed by stagnation in the 17th century, due to wars and epidemics during this period. By 1700, the population began to grow once more, so that by the time of the census of 1787, there were 1,686 people living in the municipal area consisting of five parishes. By 1850, the municipal population had increased to 2,721.

From 1850 the municipality experienced strong population growth. The number of inhabitants rose from 2,721 to 3,816 in 1870. The population continued to rise to 5,350 in 1890 and 7,929 in 1916. In 1850, Grindsted was the largest town with 42 inhabitants, while Billund only consisted of a number of farms.

Between 1920 and 1970, the population of Billund Municipality doubled from 9,912 inhabitants in 1921 to 12,835 in 1940 and 20,030 in 1965. Driven by strong growth in industry, the population of Grene Parish, including Billund, rose from 994 in 1925 to 2,699 in 1970. In 1930, Billund was still a small village with only 249 residents. In 1950, the population of the village reached 418 residents and after this time that number increased rapidly.

Population growth exploded due to The Lego Group's rapid expansion in the mid-1960s. By 1970, Billund Municipality had 21,073 residents. This rose to 24,915 in 1990 and 26,076 in 2005. Billund's population also increased from 2,015 in 1970 to 6,034 in 2007. In 2007, the number of commuters was approximately 5,000 as there were twice as many jobs in the town than the local population could fill. This growth was driven by Lego, Legoland and Billund Airport.

== Economy ==
Since it was founded in 1932, The Lego Group has been based in Billund. Its headquarters, offices and factory are all situated in the town, close to Legoland. Historically the prosperity of the town has been closely tied with the success of the company. When Godtfred Kirk Christiansen took over The Lego Group as managing director in 1957 due to his father's illness, the company experienced continued international and economic growth over several decades. Employment at the company grew from approximately 200 in 1960 to 1,000 in 1970, 3,000 in 1980, 7,000 in 1990 and 9,000 in the mid-1990s with half of employees living in Billund and the other half internationally. By 2022, the company employed 20,000 people, with over a quarter being employed in Billund. In 2003, local people in Billund faced the possibility of many job losses when the company was on the brink of collapse due to poor business decisions. Kirk Christiansen gave up his position as chief executive and ended the family's ownership. The company recovered by selling off assets, including 70% of Legoland theme parks.

In 2010, Billund was ranked as the top place in Denmark with the highest employment in the experience industries (27.3%). One in four people (25.9%) living in the municipality worked in the traditional tourism industry, particularly in local attractions such as Lego, Legoland, Lalandia and Givskud Zoo. Only 1.4% were employed in the creative industries.

== Transport ==
=== Air ===
Billund is served by Billund Airport, which is the second largest airport in Denmark after Copenhagen. It began as a strip of land purchased by the Lego Group in 1962. The company built a private airfield with the aim to reach international customers more easily. In 1964, the ownership of the airfield was transferred to Billund Airport A.m.b.A. When it opened to the public in 1964, it comprised an old hangar, a runway of 1,660 metres in length and a single control tower. In its early years, the airport served approximately 4,000 passengers with only two domestic departures per day. Since then, Billund Airport has experienced major growth and now serves as West Denmark's international airport with many flights to countries across the world. The 40,000 sq m passenger terminal has the capacity to serve 3.5 million passengers per year and the 35,000 cargo centre can handle 100,000 tonnes of goods per year. In 2022, 3,712,400 passengers passed through Billund Airport and 76,874 tons of air cargo were transported through the airport.

=== Rail ===
In 2014, a new Billund railway line was planned to connect Billund to the existing Vejle-Herning track at Jelling, with stations at Billund Airport and Legoland. The project was to be funded by the government's Train Fund DK and was due to be completed in 2020. By 2021, the project had been cancelled. The old railway station located on Lindevej was demolished in 2018 to make way for the construction of new residential apartments.

== Education ==
Billund School is the municipality's largest school. It educates approximately 700 students and has 100 staff employed at the school.

The International School of Billund located on Skolevej opened in 2013 with 60 students. Over the next ten years, the school expanded and in 2023 provided classes for 450 students.

== Religion ==
Grene Church is located near to Billund on Kirkevej. It is the main church in Grene parish, which has one parish council. It was built in 1891 to replace an earlier church using some of the remaining features, such as the bell, font and pulpit. Prior to its construction, the parish priest had worked to have the previous church that was situated in the south-west corner of the parish demolished. Construction began on 1 July 1891 and the church was completed in the summer of 1892. In 1991, the church was renovated and a new bell tower was added. An organ was also donated to the church by the Christiansen family.

Billund Church is part of the Billund Centre and a branch church of Grene Parish. It was conceived by Godtfred Kirk Christiansen, who wanted to fulfil his father's wish to build a church in the town centre. In 1969, the Kirk Christiansen family, Ole Kirk's foundation and the municipality planned the centre, which comprises other facilities, including a library, leisure centre, theatre and cafeteria. The church was built from 1971 and inaugurated on 15 April 1973. It features a church hall, adjoining congregation hall and a 17 metre high bell tower. In 1991, it was expanded to include a choir rehearsal room, meeting rooms and offices.

== Culture ==
=== Art and sculpture ===
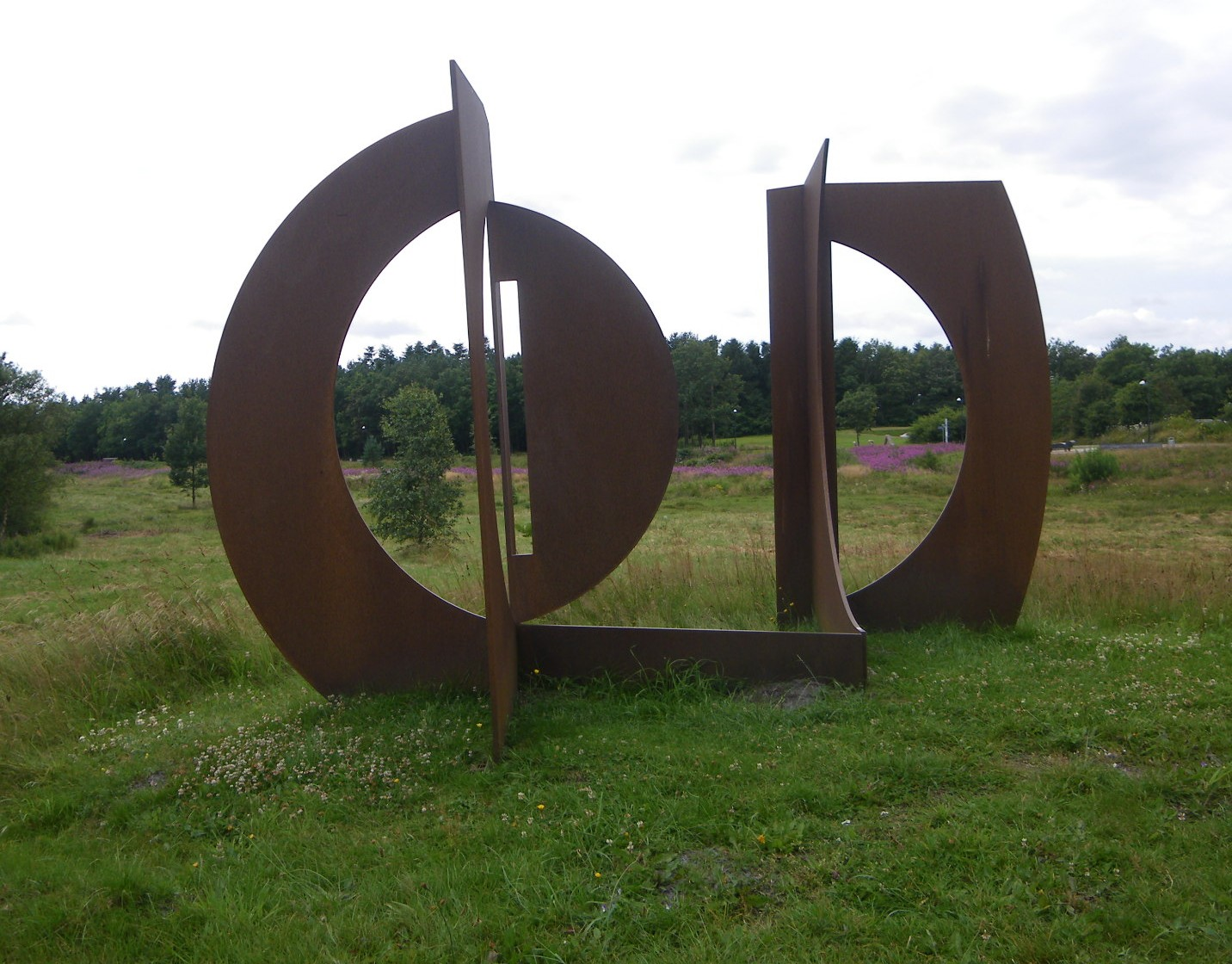
"A Meeting" by Hans August Anderson, located at Skulpturpark Billund, a landscape sculpture park

In 1991, a 1.3 km Skulpturpark was established in the heart of Billund. It is a free nature trail maintained by Billund municipality that features a variety of art sculptures. Skulpturpark was developed by a working group with a vision to provide an artistic experience for residents and tourists in a natural environment. The route extends along Billund Brook between Billund Trotbane/Enggårdsskolen and the Skovparken quarter and was later expanded to include the area along the Billund Centre. The first sculpture erected on the route was "Entrance" by Niels Peter Bruun Nielsen. The working group aimed to purchase 25 to 35 sculptures over several years. These sculptures include "The Star Animal" by Harvey Martin, "Three toy sculptures" by Poul Bækhøj, "Standing figure" by Keld Moseholm Jørgensen and "The Garden Wife" by Lotte Olsen.

Billund municipality holds an annual sports and culture gala that takes place every spring to celebrate achievements in sports and culture. Candidates are nominated for the previous year and the awards are presented at an entertainment show.

=== Libraries and cultural facilities ===
Billund Centre is a cultural centre located in the middle of Billund. It was built in 1973 and was a gift from the Kirk Christiansen family and Ole Kirk's Foundation to Billund Municipality. The centre incorporates several facilities for local residents, including Billund Library, Billund Church, Citizen Service, Grene Parish history archive and Billund School of Culture.

Billund Library was redesigned by Rosan Bosch to provide a creative space for children to play and learn. It was completed in 2016 and, in the same year, was nominated for a Danish Design Award.

== Sport and leisure ==
Billund Trotting Track provided equestrian sport for 50 years in Billund. In January 2021, the racetrack was purchased by KIRKBI A/S, the majority owner of Lego. The track was closed and the Sydjysk Equestrian Association planned to establish a new arena for equestrian sports. In place of the track, a 200,000 m2 urban district, Billund Travbyen was planned for construction starting in 2024.

Billund Bad, a public swimming pool opened in 1969. An outdoor pool was first opened to the public on 4 July 1969 and was inaugurated on 7 September 1969. The outdoor pool received 40,000 visitors in its first two months. An indoor pool was later inaugurated in 1985. After 35 years, a renovation project of the indoor pool was undertaken, funded by Billund Municipality, Ole Kirk's Foundation and local residents and businesses.

== Tourism ==
Billund is a popular tourist destination for families. Many of the town's attractions are connected by a Playline trail, which was designed to provide tourists with a safe, child-friendly path around the town. Legoland Billund Resort draws 2 million tourists per year to Billund.

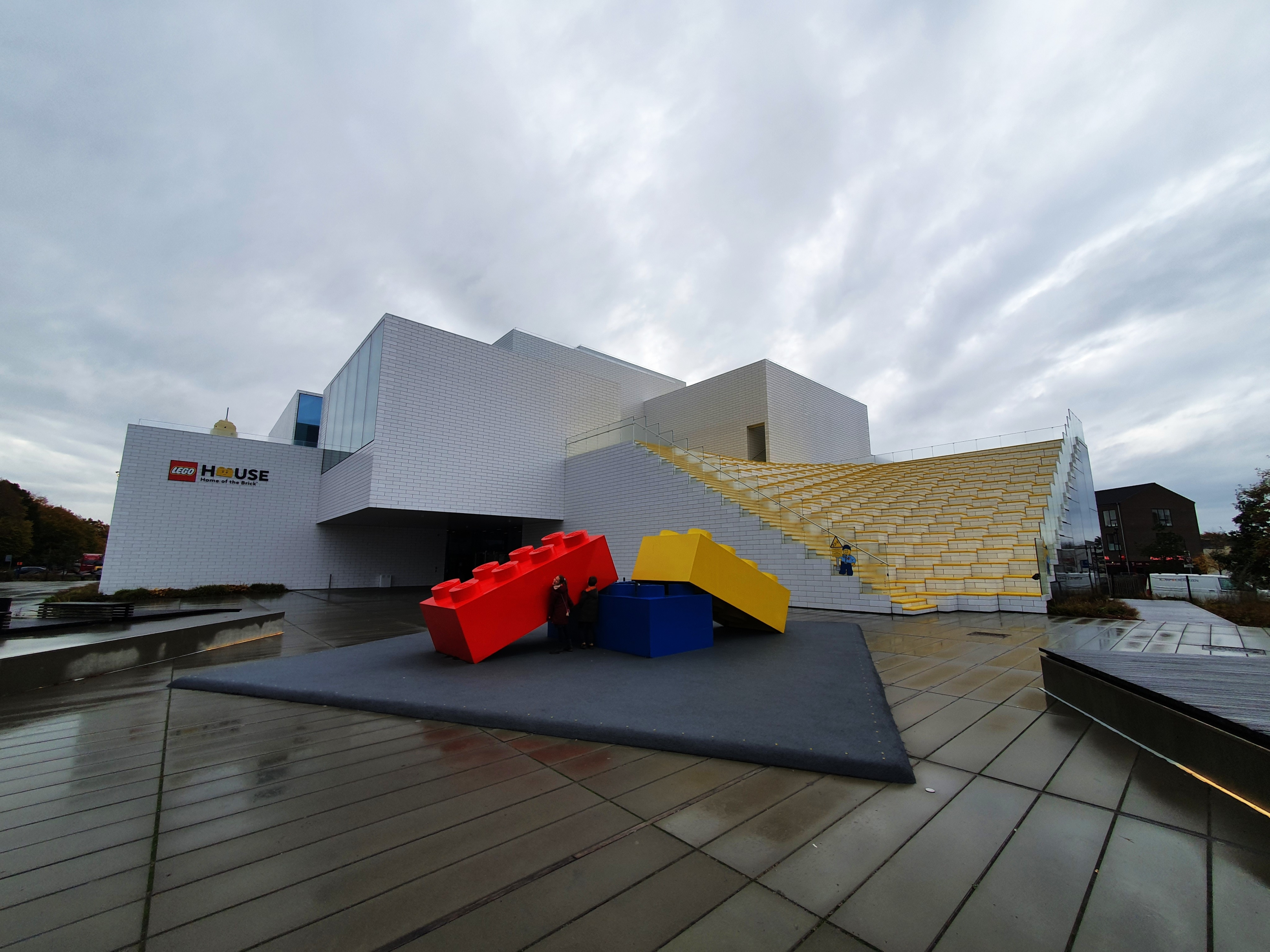
Lego House, an experience centre in Billund

Another visitor attraction, Lego House opened in September 2017. It was designed by Bjarke Ingels Group to have the appearance of a stack of Lego bricks and features restaurants, play zones and a public square.

Billund is also the location of Lalandia, the largest water park in Scandinavia. It is situated close to Legoland and includes a tropical water park named the Aquadome and other leisure activities, such as bowling, ice skating and mini golf. In the centre of town a Teddy Bear Art Museum is also open to visitors and is located in the former home of Godtfred Kirk Christiansen.

A children's adventure park named WOW Park is situated ten minutes from Billund. It provides a tree-top adventure experience set within a forest.

== Places of interest ==
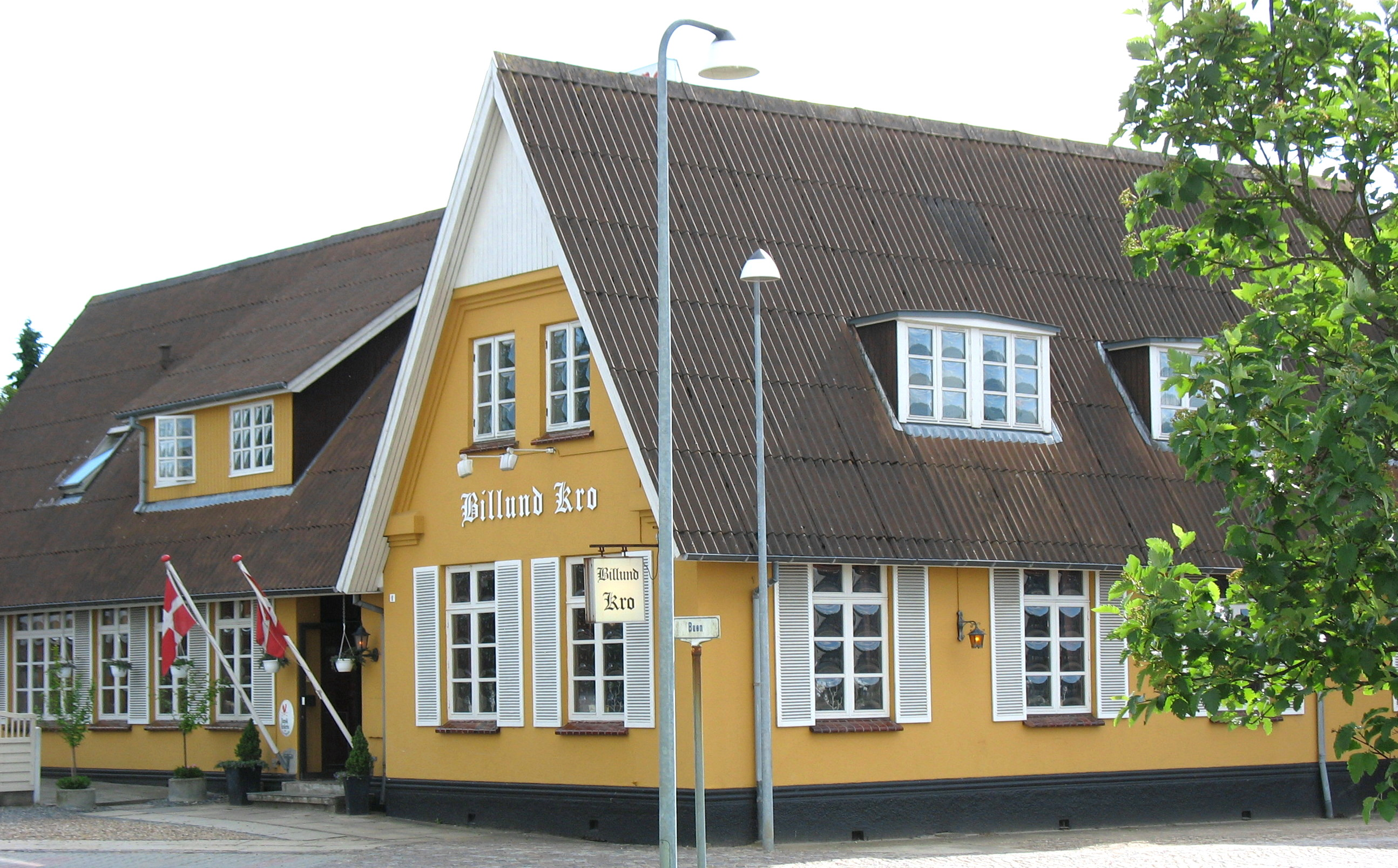
Billund Inn, prior to 2015

- Billund Inn, located in the town centre, is one of Billund's oldest buildings. The inn opened in 1834. It was taken over by new owners in 2015 and renamed Hotel Refborg.
- Lego Ideas House - a private museum owned by The Lego Group. It comprises three buildings that have historical significance: The first building is the former family home of Ole Kirk Christiansen, which was built in 1924. The second building is the System House, which is the site of the first Lego headquarters and was built in the late 1950s. The third building is the old woodworking factory, which was built in 1942.
- Lego Campus - the 54,000 sq metre headquarters of The Lego Group, located on Højmarksvej, which was constructed by C. F. Møller Architects. It took five years to design and build and was completed in 2022. It was designed to be a flexible working environment for the company's employees and their families.

== Notable people ==
- Godtfred Kirk Christiansen (1920 in Billund – 1995) the managing director of The Lego Group from 1957 to 1979
- Kjeld Kirk Kristiansen (born 1947 in Billund) the former president and CEO of The Lego Group (1979–2004) and the third richest Dane, with a net worth of $4.7 billion as of February 2020.
- Line Bonde (born c.1979) a Danish fighter pilot, brought up in Billund. In July 2006, aged 27, she became the first female Danish fighter pilot, flying an F-16 jet fighter
- Nicolai Højgaard (born 2001), Danish professional golfer
- Rasmus Højgaard (born 2001), Danish professional golfer
