= Lego House (Billund) =

Lego experience centre in Billund, Denmark

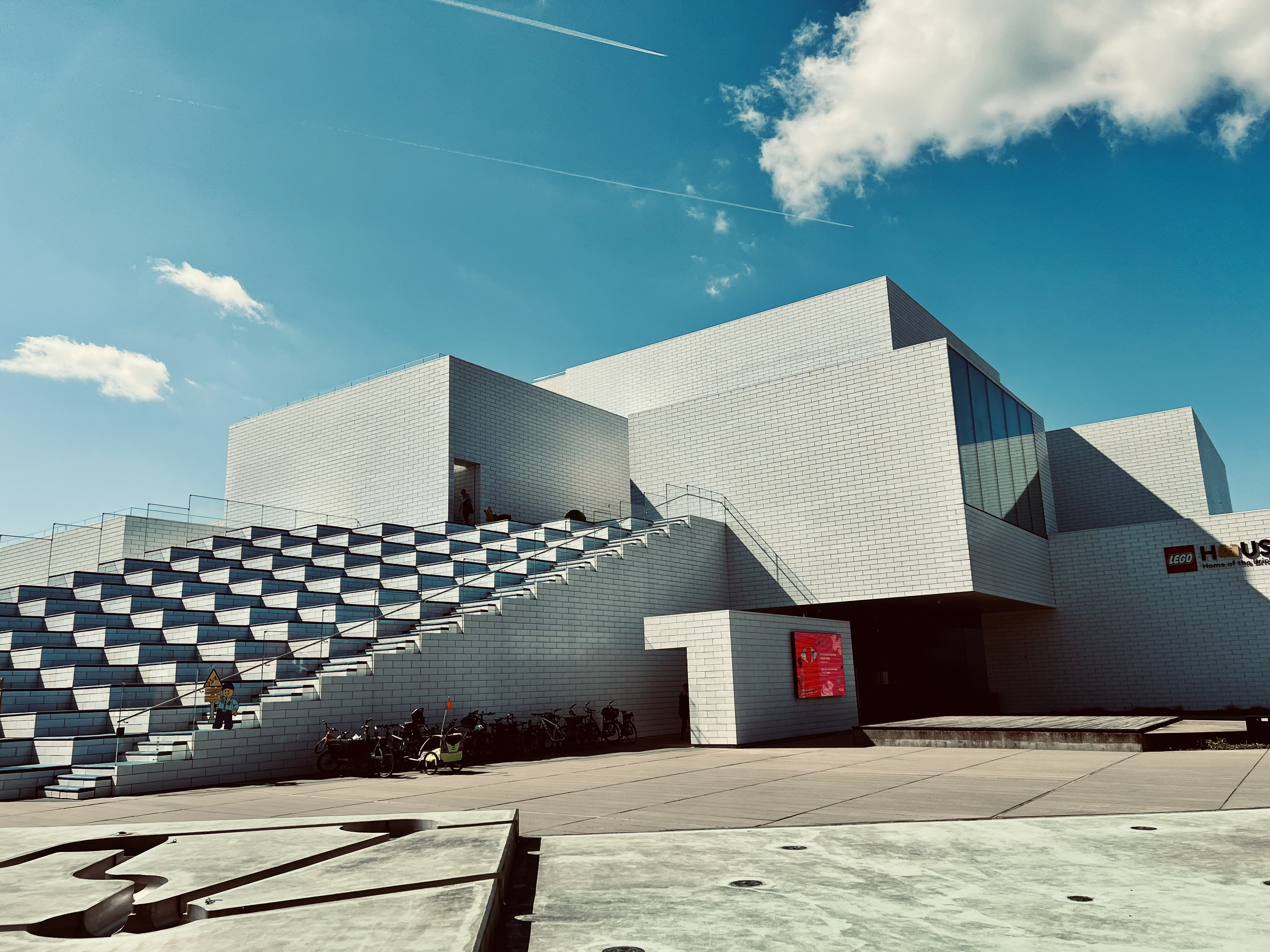
- View of Lego House

- Location within Denmark
- Alternative names: Home of the Brick

General information
- Location: Billund, Denmark, Denmark
- Coordinates: 55°43′51.6″N 9°06′53.5″E
- Construction started: 2014
- Completed: 2017
- Inaugurated: 28 September 2017
- Owner: The Lego Group

Height
- Height: 23 m (75 ft)

Technical details
- Floor area: 12,000 m^{2} (130,000 sq ft)

Website
- legohouse.com

Lego House is a 12,000-square metre building filled with 25 million Lego bricks in Billund, Denmark, located near Legoland and the headquarters of The Lego Group. It is also known as Home of the Brick with reference to Billund, where Lego originates. Visitors can experience a variety of activities during their visit, including physically and digitally building with Lego bricks, programming robots and animating models. The centre's visitor experience includes four experience zones, two exhibitions and the Lego Museum, which showcases the history of the Lego brand and company.

Lego House has been recognised for its innovative design, which aimed to reflect the Lego brand. The building incorporates 21 staggered blocks that resemble Lego bricks, with nine roof terraces containing children's play areas. The house was designed by the Bjarke Ingels Group and was inaugurated on 28 September 2017. The building is owned and maintained by Lego System A/S.

== Concept ==
The inspiration for Lego House originated in the Lego Idea House, which is located on the main street in Billund. The idea for building Lego House was conceived from a desire to share the company's history and values, whilst also inspiring visitors to play and interact with Lego bricks.

In his opening speech, Kjeld Kirk Kristiansen, the majority owner of The Lego Group described his vision for the building.

My vision with this house is to create the ultimate Lego experience which truly unfolds the endless possibilities there are with our bricks and our Lego system of play and have all these experiences in one house, the home of the brick.

In addition to its concept as a visitor centre, Lego House was also created to offer a communal urban space to the local community, due to its central location in Billund, with many areas of the complex, such as the roof terraces, having been designed to be entirely free to enter. For this reason, all of the public facilities, such as the shop and restaurant, were planned to be accessible from a free public area on the ground floor of the building.

== Design ==
Lego House was designed to resemble a pile of 21 white Lego bricks that have been built on top of each other. The building consists of a series of interconnecting modular spaces, which house the exhibition and experience areas for visitors. The entire construction consists of 8,500m² above ground and 3,400m² of basement space. The modular spaces can be visited by the use of a series of stairways, ramps and bridges, however, each was designed to be used independently.

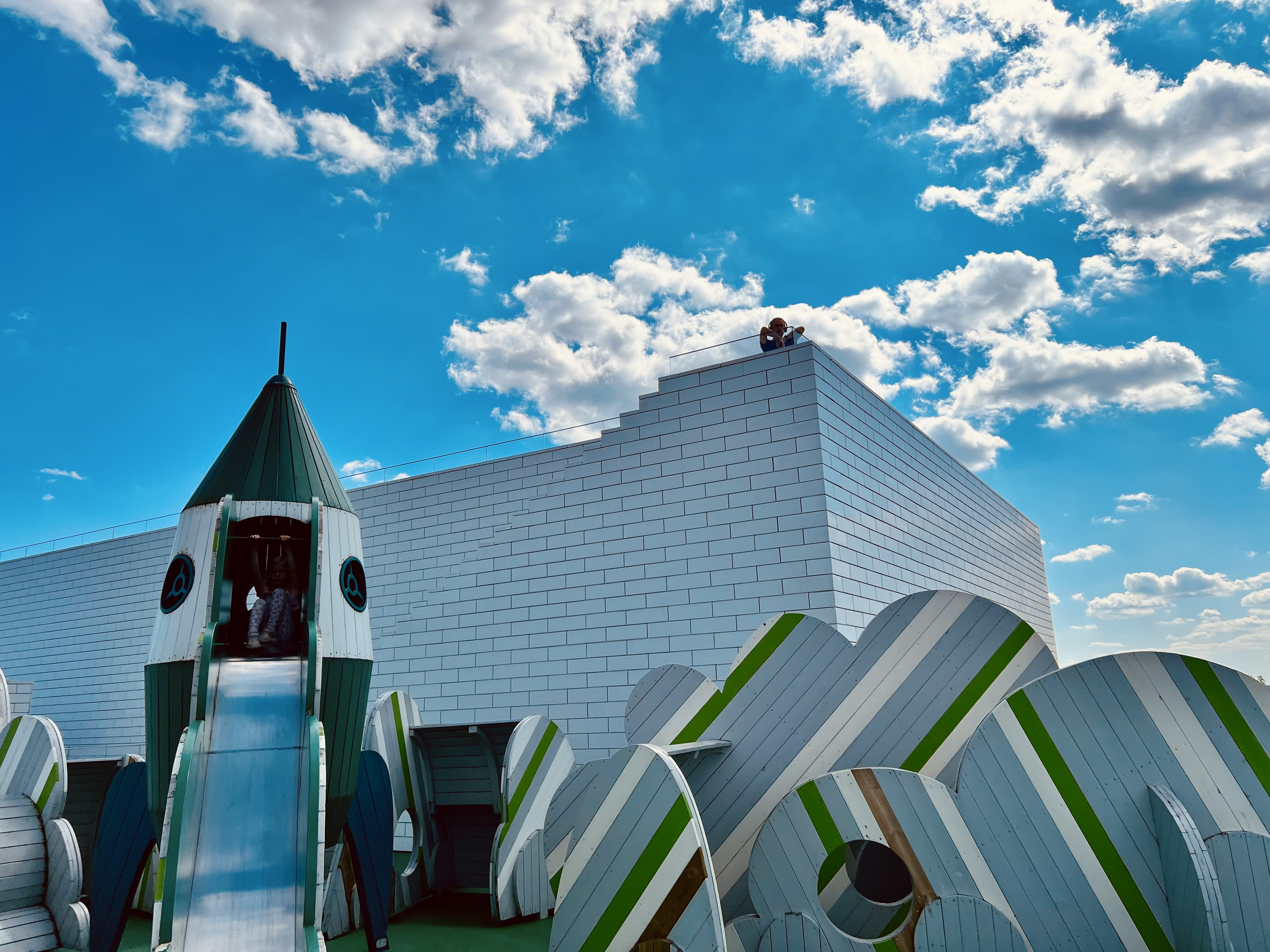
One of the upper floors of Lego House

In 2017, Danish architect, Bjarke Ingels explained his vision for the building's unique design.

The building itself reflects what LEGO play and the LEGO values are all about. The brick has been incorporated into the architecture in a simple but ingenious way, and visualises the systematic creativity that lies at the very core of all LEGO play.

Although the building appears to resemble a pile of interlocking bricks, the complete design was entirely systematic. The original design of the building took inspiration directly from the Lego brick itself. Ingels explained how the proportions of the Lego brick provide a golden ratio in architecture and have therefore been used throughout the entire building.

Just like in nature, the Fibonacci sequence or golden ratio, in the built environment the 2x4 proportion of Lego is golden. We used this everywhere, we scaled up the height to about 18 cm then the length becomes 60 cm long and it is a good useful proportion for cabinetry and building materials. In the entire façade – inside and outside – we never cut a façade module, it is either 30 or 60 cm. We never broke the rules. That’s how you get into masonry heaven.

Many features of the building's architecture incorporate the standard design elements of the Lego brick. The modular spaces were built with the exact proportions of a Lego brick, while the white tiles that cover the building also have the proportions of a classic 2x4 brick. In addition, the porthole skylights in the roof of the Keystone Gallery, which sits on top of the entire structure, are circular to mimic eight studs on the top of a Lego brick, and radiate eight beams of light to welcome visitors. The roof terraces were also painted in bright colours to mimic the bright colours of Lego bricks.

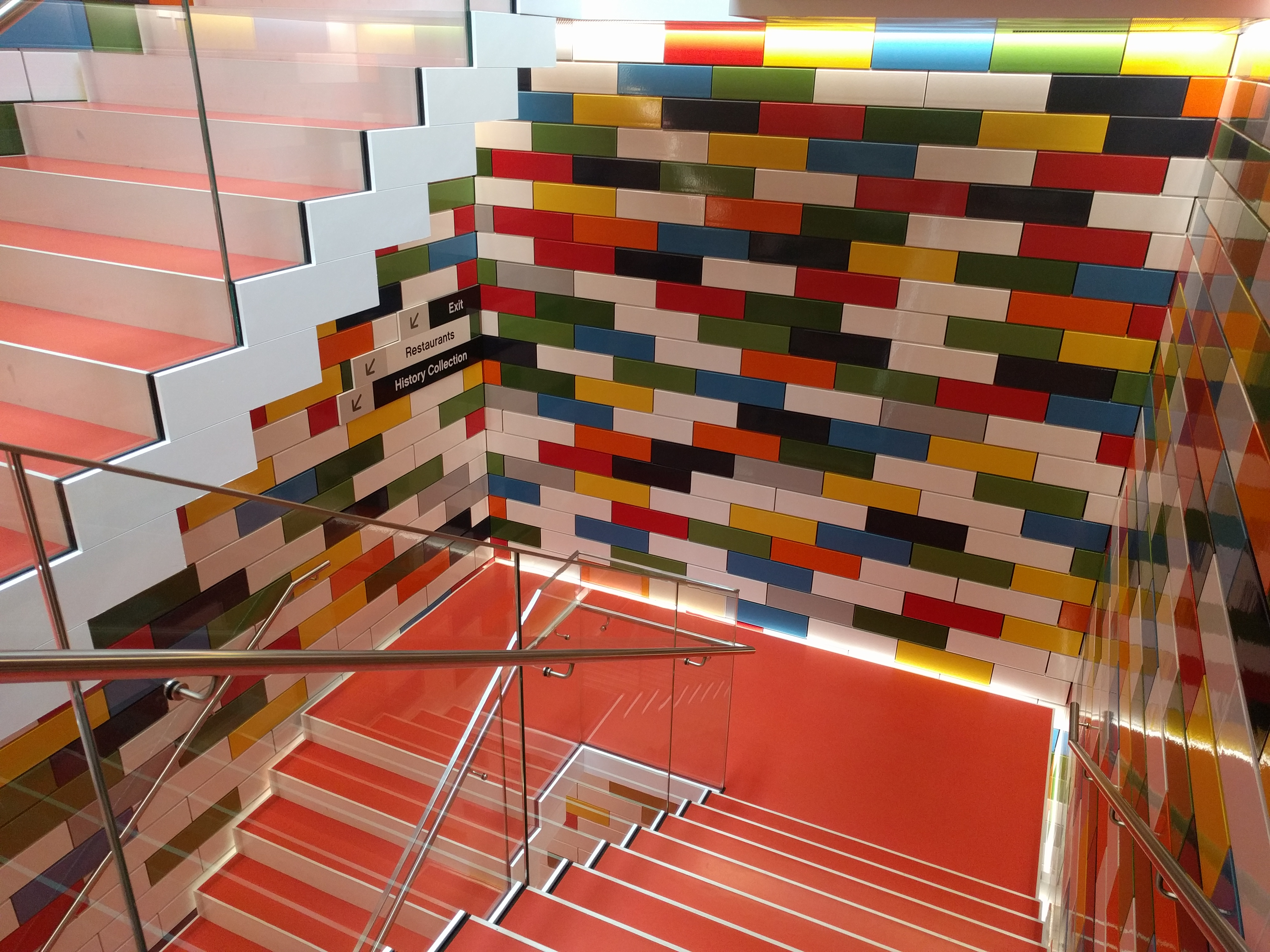
Lego House interior stairs

Both the internal spaces and external façade of the building were carefully considered during the planning stage. White ceramic tiles were used on the external façade to reflect the light and create a subdued form, in an effort to avoid overloading Billund with too much colour. The Lego colour palette was used carefully and was mainly confined to the interior spaces, particularly the floors, to create fluid movement between spaces and to help direct visitors around the building. In contrast to its subtle appearance from the ground, visitors arriving by air are able to get an aerial view of the primary colours on the top of the building.

The building's design dictated a complete absence of columns within the internal space and also on the external façade of the building. The base of the building is surrounded by a plaza, which is freely open to the public. The plaza space was designed to be open, and features no walls or columns. In order to achieve unobstructed internal spaces, the 21 modular rooms were hung from a steel bridge.

Lego House was designed to be an interactive experience for visitors both internally and externally. The external structure incorporates wide pixelated terraces, which allow visitors to climb the outside of the building in order to access the roof terraces.

== Construction ==
Lego House was built in four years, at an undisclosed budget. The building was constructed on the former site of Billund town hall, just a few metres from the location of the workshop where the company began in 1932. The site was chosen not only for historical reasons, but also to revitalise the town centre and to transform Billund into the "creative world capital of children".

Construction of the building began in early 2014 with the installation of six Lego-shaped foundation bricks. The construction of Lego House consists mainly of concrete and steel. Construction on the concrete lower deck of the basement began in October 2014 and was completed in the December. The first two steel beams were installed in February 2015. Construction of the ground floor began in March 2015 and the covering of the basement was completed in May 2015.

Lego House was originally set to open in 2016, but was delayed by a year, due to the technical challenge of implementing a design without columns. The building was officially opened in a grand ceremony, attended by HRH The Crown Prince and HRH The Crown Princess of Denmark, on 28 September 2017.

== Visitor experiences ==
=== Experience zones ===
Lego House was designed to offer a variety of experiences to its visitors, which include building and playing with Lego bricks, interacting with technology and being creative. To achieve this goal, four colour-coded experience zones were created, each giving the visitor a unique experience. Each coloured zone represents a different aspect of interaction, with red representing creative competence, green representing social competence, blue representing cognitive competence and yellow representing emotional competence.

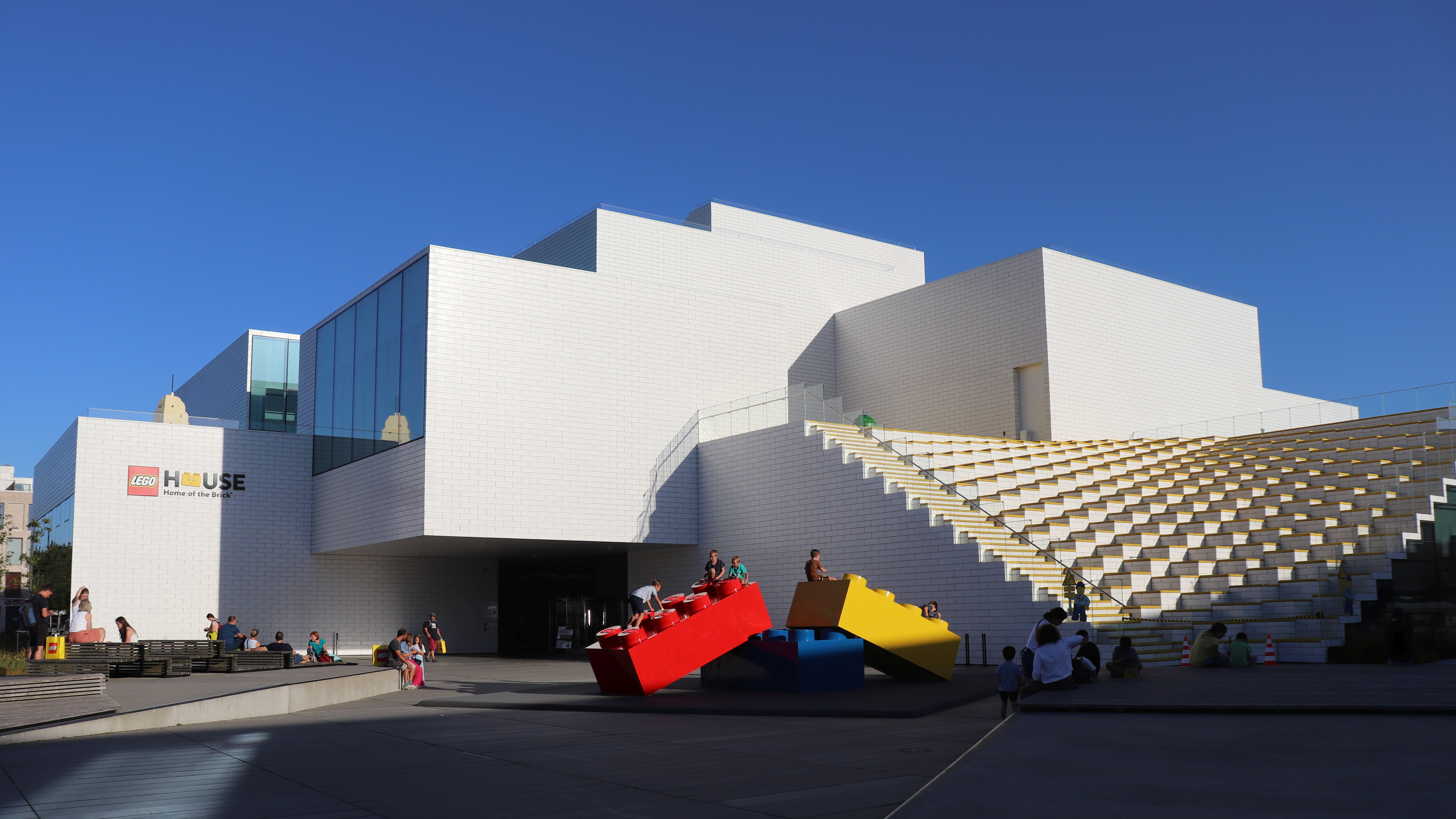
Front view of the Lego House

The Blue Zone features the Test Driver, an experience aimed at 1st to 3rd grade children, which teaches children how adding weight can make a Lego vehicle go faster. The Robo Lab also provides the opportunity to direct a robot by using coding commands to build a number of steps. This experience is designed to enhance cognitive competence.

The Green Zone includes the Story Lab, a 15 minute activity, which involves writing and directing a stop-motion movie. It was created for 4th to 6th grade children. This experience is designed to enhance social competence.

The Red Zone is dominated by a huge brick waterfall and offers free building opportunities with Lego bricks. The waterfall was designed to symbolise the never-ending flow of Lego bricks, used 2 million bricks to construct, and took about 29 weeks to complete. The zone incorporates several large vats of Lego bricks and features the Lego House Zoo in which 1st to 3rd grade learners can build animals from Lego bricks. The zone also includes the Art Machine, an experimental activity aimed at 4th to 6th grade learners, which involves the use of Lego bricks and a pen and the Creative Lab. These experiences are designed to enhance creative competence.

The Yellow Zone features the Fish Designer which is aimed at 1st to 3rd grade children and involves building fish out of Lego bricks and releasing them into a digital fish tank. This activity aims to enhance emotional competence. This concept is based on the LEGO Life of George concept which allowed users to create physical models from bricks and turn them into digital ones.

=== Tree of Creativity ===
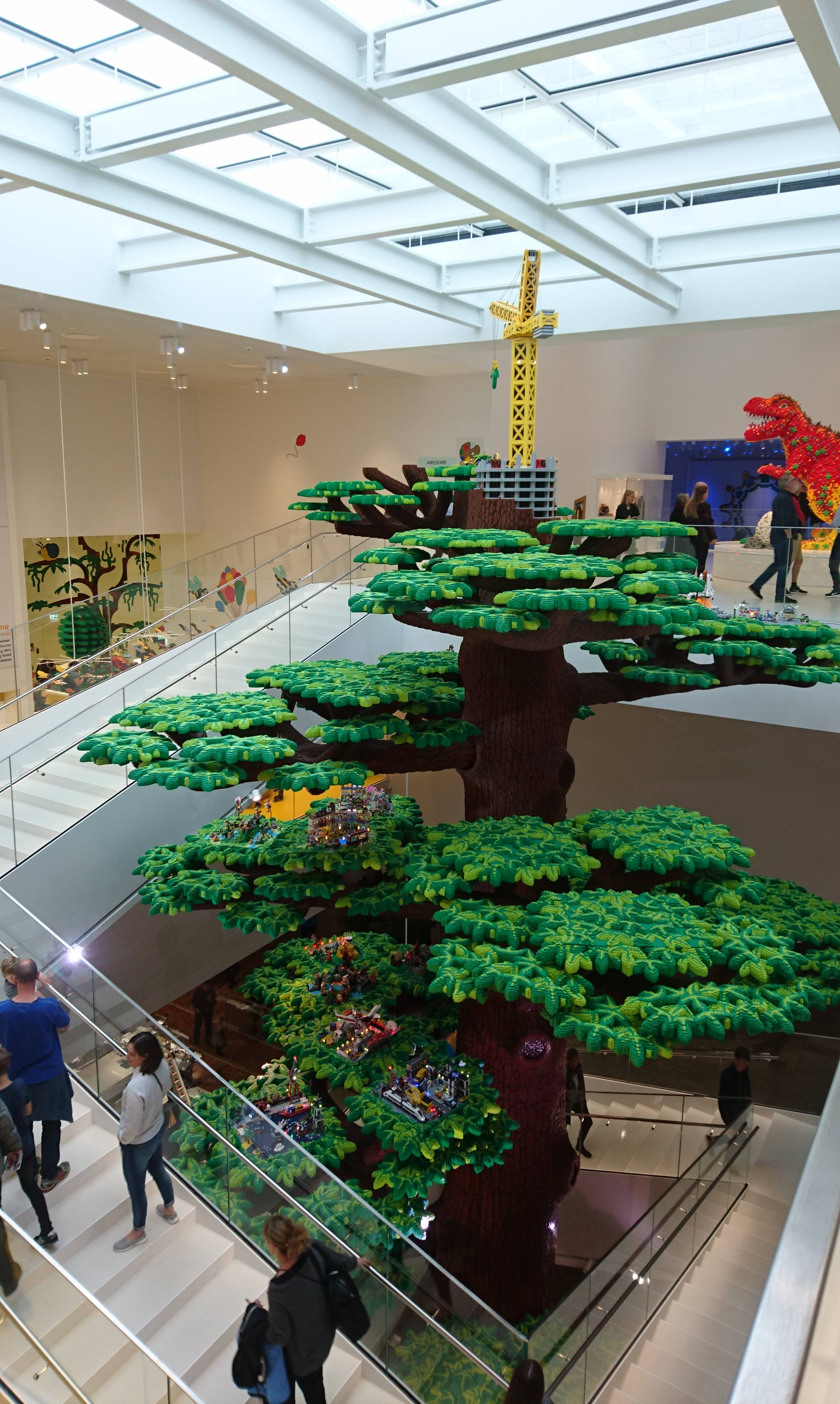
Tree of Creativity

At more than 15 metres tall, the Tree of Creativity is a huge Lego model located in the centre of Lego House. It was designed to look like a realistic tree and was built from 6,316,611 Lego bricks, making it one of the largest Lego structures ever built. The builders took 24,350 hours to assemble the finished structure. The Tree of Creativity spans several floors and can be viewed from a variety of levels and angles by using the spiral stair that wraps around the structure.

=== Masterpiece Gallery ===
The Masterpiece Gallery is situated at the top of the complex and is an exhibition of Lego constructions created by adult fans of Lego (AFOLs). It is intended to be a tribute to the creativity of both adults and children. The gallery is the location of three large dinosaur models, each built from a different system of Lego bricks, Duplo, System and Technic. The dinosaurs are three metres tall and were each constructed of between 50,000 and several hundred thousand pieces.

Stuart Harris, Senior Designer at Lego House said, "We wanted to create some unique and breathtakingly iconic models. At the same time we wanted to create opportunities within the house to showcase the incredible creativity and diversity of the AFOL community".

=== Lego Museum ===
Lego House is also home to the Lego Museum, a visitor exhibition that showcases Lego sets that have been released throughout the company's history. In the lower floor History Collection, visitors can immerse themselves in the company's brand and timeline. The complex is also the home of the Lego Vault, which is located underneath Lego Square and offers visitors the opportunity to witness the first unopened edition of every Lego set that has been produced in the company's history.

=== Roof terraces ===
The roof of Lego House was also designed to be used as a visitor experience. The roof terrace features nine creative playgrounds for children, each offering its own unique play experience and also offers a 360° panoramic view of the city. The nine playgrounds were created by Monstrum and were inspired by images on the front of Lego set packaging. Each playground was designed to offer a different adventure scenario, such as a semi-submerged submarine battling with a sea monster, a shark attacking surfboards and a space shuttle blasting into space.

=== LEGO Masters Academy ===
On April 8th 2025, LEGO House announced the opening of the LEGO® Masters Academy on 17 September 2025 as "a hands-on experience" inspired by the LEGO Masters television series. It features four progressive levels of creative sessions that guests can choose from, hosted by LEGO House Play Agents and occasionally LEGO Master Builders. The build can be taken home.

== Facilities ==
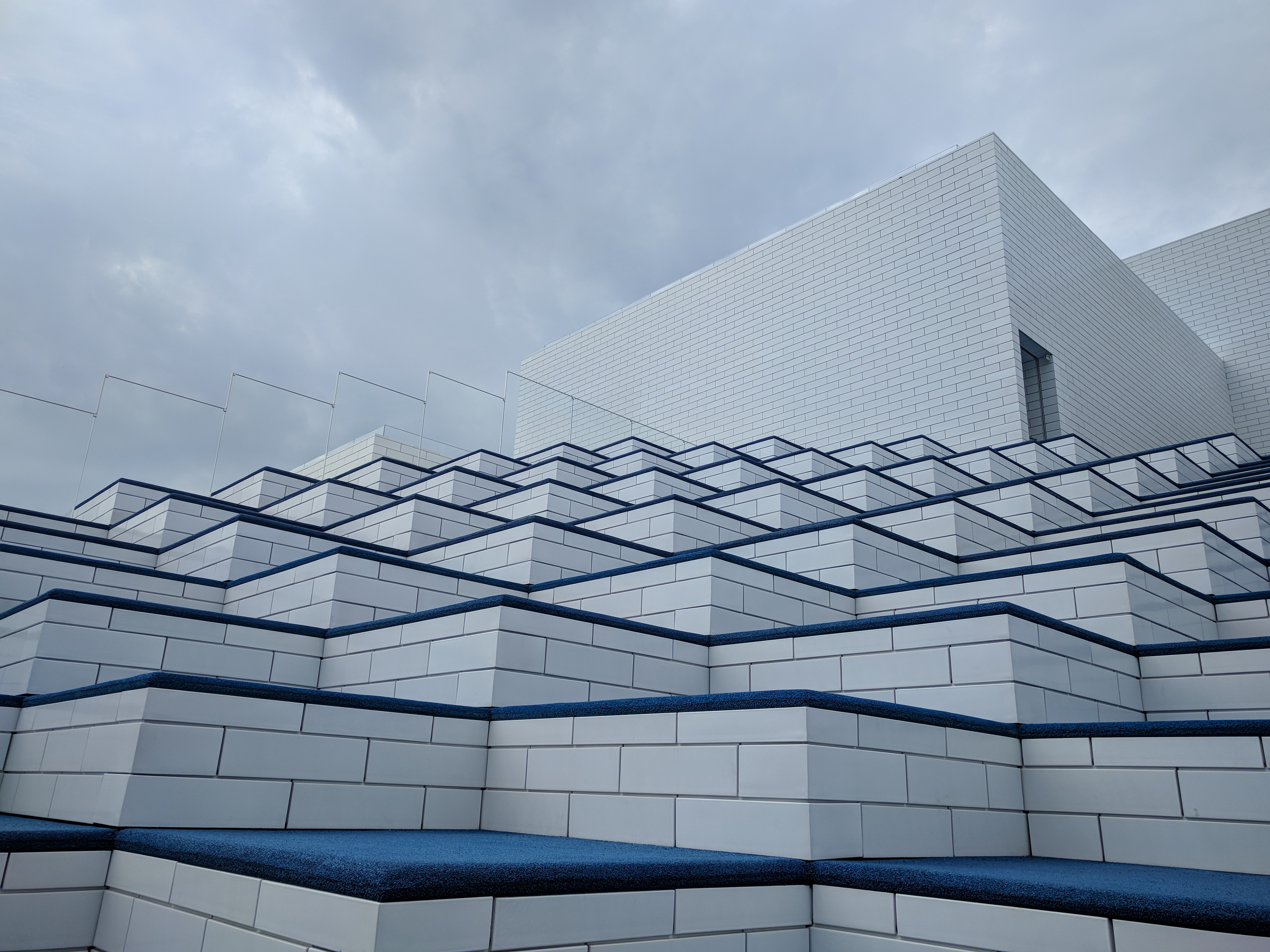
Lego House terraces

Although visitors must purchase a ticket to access the exhibitions and experience zones, the complex provides a number of public areas that are entirely free for visitors and locals to access. The building is surrounded by a 2,000 square metre public square and the exterior incorporates steps and terraces, which allow visitors to walk to the top of the building to experience views of the building and surrounding area. The initial entry point into the building is known as Lego Square and features several brick built displays and a signpost, which directs visitors to the main areas of the complex.

Alongside its visitor experiences and exhibitions, Lego House provides a number of other facilities for visitors, including three restaurants, an indoor picnic area, conference facilities and the Lego Store. The Mini Chef restaurant offers visitors a unique experience that presents menu items coded to correspond with Lego bricks, which are used to build the meal and scanned to send the order to the kitchen. The meals are then delivered by robots on a conveyor belt.

== Reception ==
Since its doors opened in 2017, general reception of Lego House has been overwhelmingly positive. Isabel Choat for The Guardian described Lego House as, "a gleaming white architectural wonder that looks as if a giant has been playing with oversized Lego bricks". Lonely Planet commented that, "It offers a stellar year-round reason to visit Billund". Adrian Welch, Editor of E-architect also praised the design of the building. "LEGO so obviously make the building look like a colourful stack of LEGO bricks – but that they take the concept to conclusion without compromise." Sally Peck for The Telegraph remarked, "Its real achievement is rather old-fashioned: like any other tale of Nordic triumph, the genius is that it’s all terrifically well-thought-out and earnest; it’s a tale of human achievement."

== Awards ==
Lego House has been recognised for its innovative design and also for its interactive visitor experience. The Good Design Awards recognised Lego House in 2018 in the Environment category. The building's architecture was also recognised by the Civic Trust Awards in 2019. Lego House, along with Bjarke Ingels Group, also won the INSIDE World Festival of Interiors Awards in 2018 in the Civic, Culture and Transport category. The building received recognition in the TEA Awards for Outstanding Achievement in the Brand Center category. Lego House was Popular Choice and Jury Award winner in the Architizer A+ Awards 2018. The building's design achieved the Danish Design Award 2018 in the Feel Good category for its design, "which in an intuitive way succeeds with its dissemination of the company and the philosophy of the brand – and at the same time is a colourful tribute to the Nordic tradition of cooperation, innovation and lifelong learning".

Time for Kids listed Lego House as one of the World's 50 Coolest Places 2019. The Michelin Guide awarded Lego House two stars in the green Michelin Guide 2019, commenting that, "Lego House is an experience not to be missed. A five-zone playground that invites children to use their creativity and ingenuity with their parents". A documentary entitled Lego House-Home of the Brick won prizes in two categories in the Cannes Corporate Media and TV Awards 2018.

The Fish Designer activity, located in the Lego House Yellow Zone achieved a Visual Media Experience Award from SXSW Innovation Awards for achieving, "content creation and delivery that moves beyond passive viewership by providing a more immersive and engaging entertainment experience".

== In other media ==
Lego House was released as a Lego Architecture set in 2017 as part of the Lego Architecture theme (set number 21037). It consisted of 774 parts and offered an accurate representation of the building in Lego form.

== See also ==
- The Lego Group
- Lego
- Bjarke Ingels Group
- Billund
- Kjeld Kirk Kristiansen
