= Christopher Hawthorne (journalist) =

American journalist and television director

Christopher Hawthorne is an American journalist and television director who served as the architecture critic for the Los Angeles Times from 2004 to 2018. In 2018, Los Angeles Mayor Eric Garcetti appointed him as the city's first Chief Design Officer.

In 2018, he directed the documentary That Far Corner for the KCET series Artbound about architect Frank Lloyd Wright's work in Los Angeles. He also directed another Artbound episode titled Third Los Angeles. In 2020, in his role as Chief Design Officer he launched the Low-Rise design challenge, aiming to promote housing affordability, new paths to homeownership, and innovative models of sustainable residential architecture. In 2021, his office announced the creation of standard Accessory Dwelling Unit (ADU) plans to help address the housing shortage facing the City of Los Angeles.
