= Vittra Utbildning =

Swedish education company

Vittra Utbildning AB (Vittra Education) is a Swedish education company that operates schools. The company runs 27 schools in Sweden and other schools in Norway, Denmark, Latvia, and Estonia. In Stockholm, the company owns the largest independent school in Sweden. The children have individual curricula designed for their needs and skills.

== Ownership ==
The company was established after the Swedish educational reforms in 1992. It is owned by Bure Equity. The founder and first CEO was Stig Johansson. The current CEO is Fredrik Mattsson.

Vittra bought the Swedish company Proteam, which operated three high schools, in May 2007. By 2009, nearly 9000 students were being educated in Vittra's schools. Since 2008, Vittra is owned by the Academedia group, the largest private school operator in Sweden.

The Vittra Telefonplan school has received several awards for its physical design. The design was developed by Rosan Bosch Studio in 2011, who also did designs for the Bortorp and Södermalm group schools.

== Other ==
The Vittra school at Telefonplan, Stockholm, is international known for its learning environments created by Rosan Bosch Studio.
