= Harvey Martin (sculptor) =

Danish sculptor (1942–2014)

Harvey Martin (17 December 1942 – December 2014) was a sculptor from Fredericia, Denmark.

Harvey Martin was born in Kauslunde, near Fredericia on Funen. He trained as a blacksmith, but found his vocation as a sculptor. He made his debut at the Artists' Autumn Exhibition in 1965.

Harvey Martin attended the Funen Art Academy, graduating in 1970. He worked in iron and steel, creating large sculptures.

Harvey Martin's sculptures are located in Denmark, the Netherlands and Germany. He has 17 sculptures on display at art museums in Denmark, among others at Heart in Herning, Vejle Art Museum and Funen Art Museum.

In 1995, he had a retrospective exhibition at Fyns Kunstmuseum, and in recent years his works can be found on streets in both Odense and Copenhagen and the town Tarm in Jutland. This town holds two sculptures by Martin.
