= Adam Reed Tucker =

American architect

- Born: 1972
- Occupations: Artist, architect
- Known for: Founder of Lego Architecture series

Adam Reed Tucker (born 1972) is an American artist and architect best known for designing highly detailed architectural models made entirely of Lego bricks. He is the creator of the Lego Architecture series and one of a few officially recognized Lego Certified Professionals.

== Biography ==
Tucker earned his professional architecture degree from Kansas State University in 1996, with an emphasis on design theory. He worked as an architect in Kansas City and later in Chicago from 1996 to 2006.

In 2002, after reading The World of Lego Toys, he began exploring the potential of Lego bricks as a medium for architectural expression. In 2006, he organized the first Brickworld convention in Chicago, an annual fan event dedicated to Lego.

In 2007, he founded Brickstructures Inc., and entered a formal partnership with The Lego Group. Through this collaboration, he launched the Lego Architecture product line in 2008. He became a Lego Certified Professional the same year, one of only a few individuals worldwide to earn that designation.

== Lego Architecture ==
The Lego Architecture line began with models of Chicago's Willis Tower (formerly Sears Tower) and the John Hancock Center. Over time, it expanded to include iconic structures such as the Empire State Building, Eiffel Tower, Fallingwater, the United Nations Headquarters, and the Trevi Fountain.

Tucker's goal was to celebrate architecture as an art form by using a medium accessible to both children and adults. He emphasized that his work was not about Lego per se, but about architecture: “I could’ve used popsicle sticks, toothpicks, or ceramics—but Lego bricks were ideal because they don’t require gluing or cutting.”

His designs aim to capture the "essence" of each building using basic geometric Lego pieces. He often uses existing Lego elements rather than custom pieces—only one new element was ever created for the entire series, used on the Robie House model.

== Exhibitions ==
Tucker's work has been featured in numerous museums, including the Museum of Science and Industry in Chicago and the Figge Art Museum in Davenport, Iowa. The Figge exhibition, The Art of Architecture, showcased 12 models including the Burj Khalifa, Empire State Building, and the St. Louis Arch. His Burj Khalifa model stood over 17 feet tall and used more than 450,000 bricks.

Tucker's exhibit for the Museum of Science and Industry, Brick by Brick, featured large-scale architectural models and pop culture references, using over 300,000 Lego bricks. He funds his projects independently, and has spent hundreds of thousands of dollars acquiring millions of Lego pieces.

== Artistic philosophy ==
Tucker views his Lego creations as sculptural interpretations of architecture. His aim is to make architectural principles accessible through playful yet educational models. “It’s not about being literal,” he said, “It’s about telling a story through simple geometry.”

He is often mistaken as a Lego employee, but functions independently as a licensed professional artist. His work has inspired interest in architecture among a broad audience, from young children to practicing architects.
