= Povlsen =

Povlsen or Povelsen is a Danish surname. Notable people with the surname include:

- Anders Holch Povlsen (born 1972), Danish billionaire, son of Troels
- Flemming Povlsen (born 1966), Danish football player
- Kasper Povlsen (born 1989), Danish footballer
- Povel Povelsen (1791–1850), Danish tax collector and politician, M.P.
- Troels Holch Povlsen (born 1949), Danish businessman, founder of fashion chain Bestseller
