= Normal (store) =

Danish discount variety store chain

Normal A/S

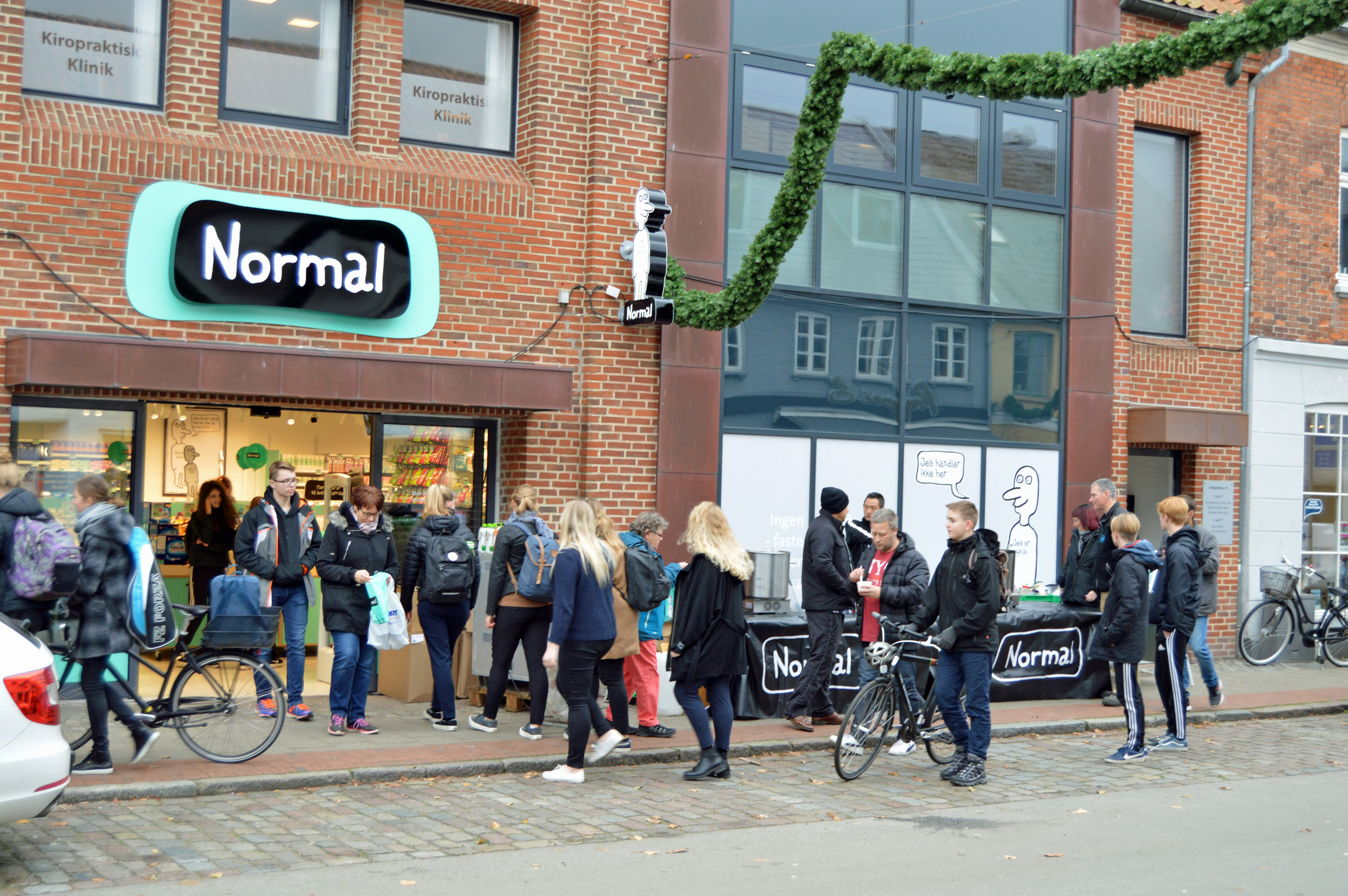
- Normal store in Ribe, Denmark
- Type: Private
- Industry: Retail
- Founded: April 2013; 13 years ago
- Founders: Torben Østergaard Mouritsen; Bo Evald Kristensen
- Headquarters: Skanderborg, Denmark
- Number of locations: 1,095 (August 2026)
- Area served: Austria; Czech Republic; Denmark; Finland; France; Ireland; Italy; Netherlands; Norway; Portugal; Romania; Slovakia; Spain; Sweden
- Key people: Jakob Frølich Maarbjerg (CEO); Torben Østergaard Mouritsen (Chairman)
- Revenue: DKK 15.2 billion (2024/25)
- Net income: DKK 897 million (2024/25)
- Owner: Anders Holch Povlsen (c. 67%)
- Number of employees: 8,376 (average, 2024/25)
- Website: normalstores.com

Normal is a Danish discount variety store chain headquartered in Skanderborg. It primarily sells branded personal care and cosmetic products, cleaning and household goods, confectionery, snacks and beverages at fixed low prices.

The chain was founded by Torben Østergaard Mouritsen and Bo Evald Kristensen, with its first store opening in Silkeborg in April 2013. It subsequently expanded throughout Europe. As of August 2026, Normal's official store locator listed 1,095 locations across 14 countries.

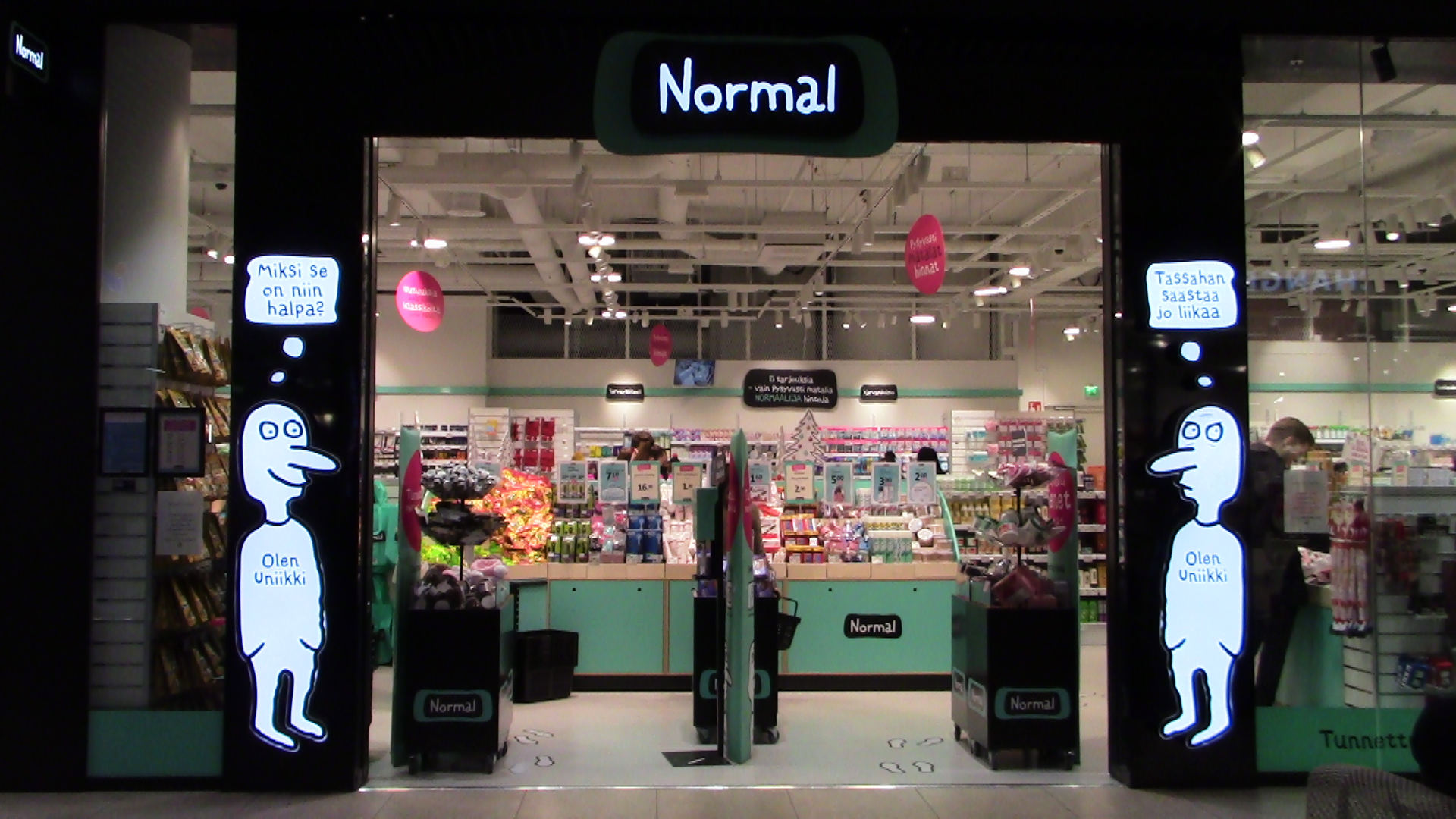
Normal store in the Mall of Tripla in Helsinki, Finland

== History ==
Normal was founded by Torben Østergaard Mouritsen and Bo Evald Kristensen, who developed a retail concept based on selling branded everyday products at consistently low prices. The first Normal store opened in Silkeborg in April 2013.

In 2014, Anders Holch Povlsen, owner of the fashion group Bestseller, became an investor in Normal. He later became the company's majority shareholder and owns approximately 67% of the chain, while Mouritsen and Kristensen each hold between 10% and 15% and Jan Dal Lehrmann holds between 5% and 10%.

The chain expanded rapidly in Denmark, growing from 25 stores at the beginning of 2016 to 76 by the end of that year. In 2017, Normal began its international expansion by entering Norway. It entered Sweden and the Netherlands in 2018, followed by France in 2019. By September 2019, the chain had 212 stores across five countries.

Normal entered Finland in 2021, Portugal in 2022 and Spain in 2023. By 2024, it operated more than 775 stores across Europe.

The chain entered Italy in 2025, followed by Ireland in November of that year. Austria became its next market in March 2026, followed by Slovakia in May and the Czech Republic in August. In 2026, Normal also announced its entry into Romania, with its first store scheduled to open in Bucharest in the autumn.

In April 2026, Normal launched Animal, a pet retail concept in Aarhus. The single store opened on 1 April and closed on 22 May of the same year.

== Business model ==
Normal sells a mixture of well-known branded products and lesser-known brands, primarily in categories such as skin care, hair care, oral care, cosmetics, cleaning products, household goods, confectionery and beverages.

A significant part of the company's business model is based on parallel importing branded goods from different markets within the European Economic Area. Normal sources products through a network of suppliers and purchases them in markets where they can be obtained at lower prices. Prices may differ between countries according to local market conditions and purchasing power.

Unlike many other discount retailers, Normal generally does not rely on temporary sales or promotional discounts. Products are instead sold at fixed low prices while they remain in the assortment.

The chain maintains a core assortment of everyday products alongside a frequently changing selection of other goods. Around 100 new products are introduced each week, and stores carry approximately 6,000 different items.

Normal stores use a maze-like layout with a prescribed route through the product categories, an arrangement intended to make shopping resemble a "treasure hunt".

When Normal entered France in 2019, its stores had an average sales area of approximately 300 m^{2} (3,200 sq ft). The chain generally targets locations with high pedestrian traffic, including city centres, shopping streets and shopping centres.

== Stores ==
As of August 2026, Normal's official store locator listed 1,095 locations across 14 European countries.

Country	Entry year	Number of stores
Denmark	2013	170
Norway	2017	219
Netherlands	2018	50
Sweden	2018	152
France	2019	256
Finland	2021	105
Portugal	2022	54
Spain	2023	49
Ireland	2025	7
Italy	2025	23
Austria	2026	4
Slovakia	2026	2
Czech Republic	2026	3
Romania	2026	2
