= Kings High School =

Kings High School may refer to:

- Kings High School (Kings Mills, Ohio)
- The King's High School for Girls, an independent day school in Warwick, England
- The Bourne Academy, formerly known as Kings High School, a mixed secondary school in Bournemouth, Dorset, England
- King's High School, Dunedin
