= Bestseller (company) =

Danish clothing company (e. 1975)

Bestseller A/S
- Type: Private
- Industry: Clothing
- Founded: Brande, Denmark, 1975
- Founder: Troels Holch Povlsen
- Headquarters: Brande, Jutland, Denmark
- Number of locations: 2,700 retail stores & 15,000 wholesale customers
- Area served: Europe, Middle East, India, China and Canada
- Key people: Anders Holch Povlsen (sole owner)
- Number of employees: 17,000
- Website: https://www.bestseller.com/

Bestseller A/S is a privately held family-owned clothing and accessories company founded in Denmark in 1975. The company provides affordable fashion for men, women and children. They market their products in 70 markets across most of Europe, the Middle East, Canada, India and globally via e-commerce. They operate almost 9,000 shops worldwide, 6,000 in China and the rest mainly in Europe.

== History ==
The company was founded in 1975 by Troels Holch Povlsen in Brande, Denmark. Originally its focus was on women's fashion. It introduced children's clothing in 1986 and menswear in 1988. Bestseller is family-owned and the company employs around 17,000 people.

A December 2023 report funded by the Progressive Alliance of Socialists and Democrats found Bestseller's China-based supplier had connections to forced Uyghur labor.

== Brands ==
Bestseller has a number of different brands under which it sells its clothing. The brands are listed below and are sold both in the company's own stores and through independent retailers.

=== Women's clothing ===
Vero Moda

- ONLY – Bestseller's largest brand, young female fashion
- Vero Moda – The company's basic brand of women's clothing. In 2007, the company hired the supermodel Gisele Bündchen to promote the brand in 2007–08.
- Mamalicious – maternity wear
- VILA – for younger women
- SELECTED Femme – sister brand to Selected Homme
- Junarose – plus size
- Y.A.S
- Topshop (joint-venture with ASOS)
- Noisy May
- PIECES
- Object
- Jacqueline de Yong
- produkt
- JJXX – Bestseller's newest, young female brand

=== Menswear ===
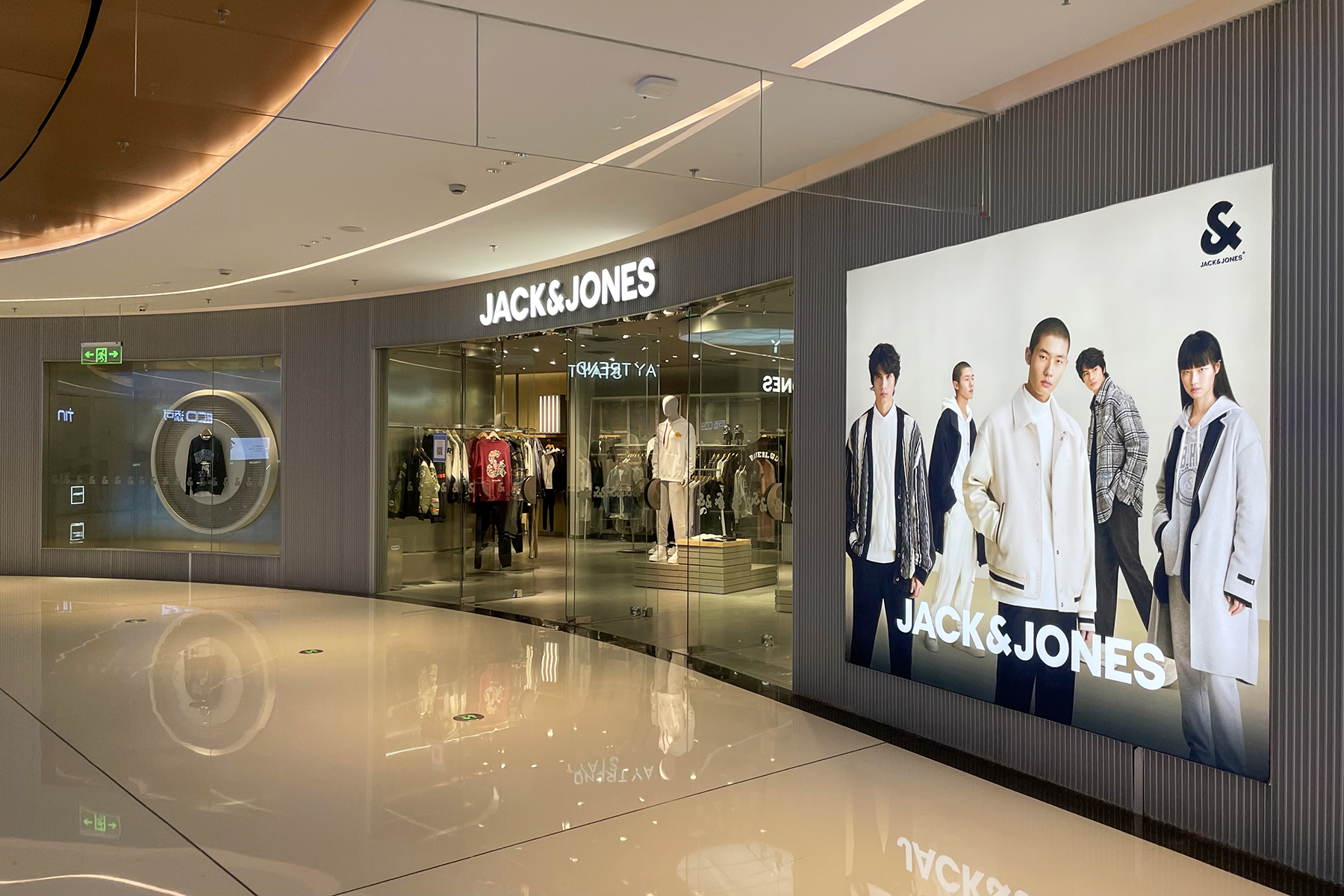
Jack & Jones store in Zhengzhou, China

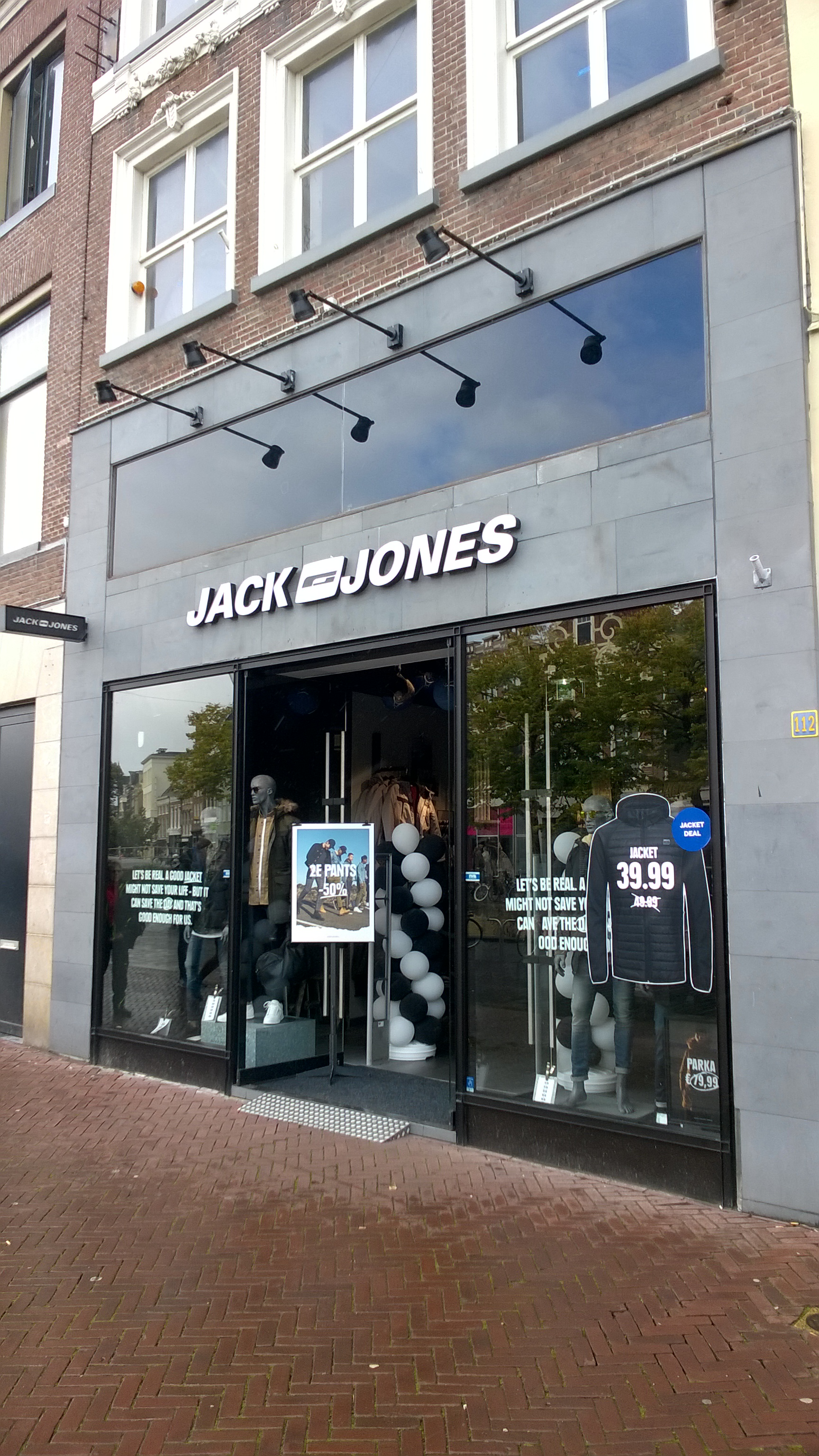
Jack & Jones store in Leeuwarden

- Jack & Jones – brand targeted at younger customers, with underwear and other garments. It was released in 1990. Originally a denim specialty brand, the brand has since expanded its product line to include comfortable, modern urban sportswear, shoes, and accessories. They sponsor Danish sportsmen Mikkel Kessler and Kevin Magnussen, as well as Danish esports team Astralis and American Formula One team Haas F1 Team. The first store opened in Trondheim, Norway, in 1991, and the second in Sweden the same year. A year later, stores opened in Finland and Denmark. By 1994, the number of stores in the Scandinavian countries had increased to 36. There were 1,000 stores by 2025.
- Selected Homme – contemporary menswear label, including tailored suits and shirts
- Outfitters Nation – targeted at teenagers, later changed to LMTD.
- Only & Sons
- Topman (joint-venture with ASOS)

=== Children's clothing ===
- Name It – clothes for babies and children.

=== Other ===
- Normal – variety store chain (71.29% share).

== Retail stores ==
Bestseller has shops in most European countries, the Middle East, India, China, Uruguay, and Canada (over 45 countries in total). Bestseller is one of the biggest European fashion companies in China with more than 1,200 shops and is said to be "one of the only foreign clothing companies successful at penetrating the middle price range Chinese consumer market". Shops sell either clothing of one single brand or of all brands of the company. There are more than 800 shops selling Vero Moda around the globe. The Jack & Jones brand is sold in approximately 2,000 retail shops, of which 270 are Jack & Jones franchises.

== Stakes in other retailers ==
Bestseller, via its parent holding company Heartland, is the largest shareholder at 29.5% of British e-commerce firm ASOS.com, and owns 10% of German retailer Zalando. In July 2018, Heartland invested $300m in German fashion startup About You.

In November 2012, Bestseller bought 10% of SmartGuy Group, when they became quoted on the Danish stock exchange Nasdaq OMX.

== Bestseller Tower ==
Bestseller Tower was a planned high-rise building in Brande, a rural town in Denmark. The proposed 320-metre (1,050 ft) skyscraper would house the headquarters of fashion company Bestseller and was announced in 2017 with a design by Dorte Mandrup. The tower was scheduled to be completed in 2023 and would have been the tallest building in Western Europe. In 2020 the project was shelved by the company.

== Criticism ==
=== Supply chains ===
In June 2017, the Danish independent media and research center DanWatch documented in collaboration with The Guardian, what have been called "slave-like conditions" at Cambodian garment factories supplying Bestseller. Lack of breaks, temperatures of up to 37 degrees in the work halls, insufficient ventilation systems, and strict rules regarding water and food intake led to workers fainting from exhaustion. According to the reports, female garment workers often worked overtime under inhumane conditions and for below Cambodian living wages.

Bestseller's Head of Communications stated in connection with a fire at a factory in February 2017 that Bestseller fundamentally stands by the supply chain transparency efforts they undertake at Cambodian garment factories. Reportedly, workers had to resume clothing production during the incident, even before the fire was extinguished and the smoke had cleared. Doctors, labor experts, NGOs, unions, and the women themselves attributed the ensuing mass fainting to heat, overwork, hunger, thirst, sheer exhaustion, and panic.

A 2022 briefing of the Business & Human Rights Resource Centre, highlights allegations of union-busting and related abuse at factories who supply, or have recently supplied, Bestseller.

=== Private jets ===
In 2024, Anders Holch Povlsen, CEO of Bestseller, was scrutinized by Danish news broadcaster DR for the environmental impact of his private jet usage. Povlsen owns the company Blackbird Air, which operates two private jets used for both business and personal travel, with over 1,100 flights recorded between 2020 and 2023. Despite Bestseller's public commitment to sustainability and reducing climate impact, these flights reportedly emit 17 times more CO_{2} per passenger compared to commercial flights. Bestseller has defended the flights as necessary for business, citing security and logistical reasons. However, the private jets were demonstrably used for extensive private commuting to Povlsen's private Aldourie Castle in Scotland, to which the CEO flew American singer Lionel Richie for his 50th birthday. Critics, including climate activists, have labeled this as excessive, particularly given the company's stated environmental goals. Scottish media also reported on the private jet usage, pointing out the contrast with Povlsen's environmental donations and rewilding projects in Scotland. An NGO cited in the article described this as a case of greenwashing. As of October 2024, Bestseller declined to comment.
