= Peter Hare =

Peter Hare may refer to:

- Peter Hare (officer) (1748–1834), company officer in Butler's Rangers
- Peter Hewitt Hare (1935–2008), American philosopher
- Peter Hare (cricketer) (1920–2001), English cricketer and educator
