= Michael Benner =

Michael Benner may refer to:

- Michael Paul Benner (1935–1957), British recipient of the George Cross
- Maikel Benner (born 1980), Dutch baseball player
