= Nick Robertson (businessman) =

British businessman (born 1967)

- Born: Nicholas John Robertson; November 1967 (age 58)
- Education: Canford School
- Occupation: Co-founder of ASOS.com
- Years active: 2000–
- Children: 3
- Relatives: Nigel Robertson (brother)

Nicholas John Robertson (born November 1967) is a British businessman, the co-founder of ASOS.com, an online fashion and beauty retailer, and served as its CEO from 2000 to 2015.

Robertson, along with his brother Nigel Robertson the founder of FreePages, was educated at Canford School, Dorset.

In 2016, as part of the divorce settlement with his ex-wife Janine, Robertson was ordered by a High Court judge to pay her £70 million, about a third of his £220m net worth.

In May 2020, football club AFC Wimbledon announced that he would become a minority shareholder.

In 2020, he became a major shareholder in Kidly.co.uk (a kids clothing and toys website) and TackleTarts.uk (an angling marketplace).
