= Aldourie =

Coordinates: 57.4000°N 4.3288°W

Aldourie: Scottish Gaelic: Allt Dobharaidh
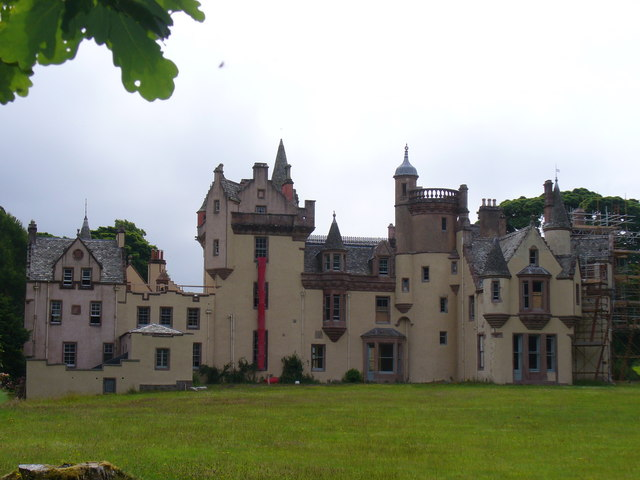
- Aldourie Castle

- Location within the Inverness area
- OS grid reference: NH622360
- Council area: Highland
- Country: Scotland
- Sovereign state: United Kingdom
- Postcode district: IV2 6
- Police: Scotland
- Fire: Scottish
- Ambulance: Scottish
- UK Parliament: Inverness, Skye and West Ross-shire
- Scottish Parliament: Skye, Lochaber and Badenoch

Aldourie (Scottish Gaelic: Allt Dobharaidh meaning dark water or stream water) is an historic Estate on the east shore of Loch Ness. It lies about 7 miles (11 km) southwest of Inverness and is within the council of Highland, Scotland.

Aldourie Castle had minor alterations to the dining room and other sundry areas designed by Robert Lorimer in 1902.

In 2015, Aldourie Castle was purchased for £15 million by Danish billionaire Anders Holch Povlsen
