= Nigel Robertson =

British businessman (born 1962)

- Born: 13 August 1962 (age 62); Redhill, Surrey, England, UK
- Occupation(s): Co-founder and Director of Disruptive Tech Ltd
- Parent(s): Cynthia and John Robertson (great-grandson of Austin Reed)

Nigel Patrick Robertson (born 13 August 1962) is a British entrepreneur and businessman, best known as the founder of FreePages plc (later renamed Scoot.com). Nigel was included in the 2005 Sunday Times Rich List and Monaco's Rich List in 2007.

== Biography ==
Nigel Robertson is a great-grandson of Austin Reed, the founder of Austin Reed Group plc, the British fashion retail chain. He attended Feltonfleet School in Cobham, Surrey and Canford School near Wimborne Minster, Dorset.

Nigel grew up in Surrey and today lives partly in Beverly Hills, Los Angeles, and partly in Monaco.

== Business ventures ==
Nigel Robertson started his career in the advertising industry in 1981 as a media planner/buyer with Michael Bungey DFS. In 1984, he joined Television South West as an advertising sales executive. Subsequently, he became a director and shareholder of the advertising agency Squires White Robertson Gill plc in 1987. Four years later, he co-founded the directory business FreePages plc, later rebranded as Scoot.com and quoted on the Alternative Investment Market (AIM) in 1994. Robertson stepped down and left the company in 1998 and went to live in Monaco. In 2004 he founded Blue Star Capital plc as a vehicle to invest in private companies while working alongside management to help them develop their businesses. A number of these companies have now been quoted on AIM, including ASOS plc. Robertson resigned from Blue Star Capital in December 2008. In 2011, he founded Disruptive Tech Ltd, an investment holding company in disruptive technologies.
