= Loot (magazine) =

UK magazine

- Chief executive: Graham Tolhurst
- Managing director: Claire Payne
- Appointed marketing director: Jo Earle
- Owner/Executive: Elgin Loane
- Categories: Classified advertising
- Frequency: Weekly
- Circulation: 180,000
- Founder: David Landau
- Founded: 1984
- First issue: March 1985; 41 years ago
- Company: Daily Mail and General Trust
- Country: United Kingdom
- Based in: London
- Language: English
- Website: loot.com
- ISSN: 2045-6956

Loot was one of the United Kingdom's leading free classified advertising publishers, distributing its products via print, Internet, interactive television and Wireless Application Protocol (WAP). As of 2026 it remained in operation as a Web site.

== History and profile ==
Loot was founded in 1984 when David Landau, an Oxford don and an art historian, picked up a magazine titled Secondamano ("second-hand") in a Milan airport, believing it to be an antiques magazine. Finding out it was a free classified advertisements magazine instead, he was intrigued by the concept, and discovered that there was no similar free-of-charge classified advertisements publication in the UK at that time (advertising in the similar Exchange & Mart was not free). Together with his sister Elizabeth, who came up with the name Loot for the new venture, and her husband Dominic Gill, then music critic for the Financial Times, the trio raised the money to launch their first publication, the London edition of LOOT: London's Noticeboard, in 1985.

The paper was launched in March 1985 on paper the same colour as the Financial Times (i.e. pale pink or salmon), promoted as a free way "to buy, sell or exchange absolutely anything", published every Thursday. It containing only 16 pages of ads in the first edition, but soon increased the number of pages. Classified ads were initially limited to 50 words (349 characters), later cut to 30 words.

The magazine used the slogan LOOT stands for "Look Out On Thursdays", but later started publishing a Monday edition printed on yellow paper. During the early days, LOOT's policy was to have a forum called the Personal Messages column 100 on the front page, continuing on page 2, which was not for selling but contained messages from people who started to use various pen names or "LOOT names" (e.g. IWETEC standing for I Will Escape To the European Continent, Dirty Harry, Guitarman, Tiger, Sunshine, Harlequin, Lambkins, and Michelin Man). After several months this moved to column 900 near the back, along with other personal or social categories, such as Announcements, Campaign/Lobby, and Lonely Hearts.

The first "LOOT Night Out" (LNO) was held in September 1985 at a venue in northwest London called "The Production Village" for advertisers in the Personal Messages column to meet each other and some of the staff. This was followed by a few larger scale "LOOT Nights Out", organised by the magazine themselves, attended by a larger cross-section of LOOT readers, then continued with smaller-scale events organised by the advertisers in the Personal Messages column.

LOOT started publishing three weekly editions, then increased to five weekly editions, each on a different colour paper.

In 1988, Loot started a Manchester edition, which was followed by other regional editions. At one point, Loot's free-ads publication was published in 20 editions per week across the UK (including county-based editions such as in Essex and Kent), with a weekly circulation of approximately 180,000 copies in 1994. Loot launched Loot.com, headed by London managing director Graham Tolhurst. Loot.com quickly grew to become one of the world's largest online marketplaces, receiving more than 1.5 million advertisements online per month in 1999.

By February 2012, Loot was published thrice weekly in London and Manchester, and weekly in Liverpool; two specialist papers, Loot Recruit and Jobs Week, were also published weekly in the London area, and Bargain Pages in the West Midlands. Its website, Loot.com, generated approximately 24 million monthly page impressions and had 557,000 unique users, according to a March 2009 ABC audit.

The Loot group was bought in June 2000 by Scoot.com, but the company was forced to sell the publication at a heavy loss just 14 months later to Daily Mail and General Trust, and Loot became a division of Associated New Ventures, publishing private and business advertisements in more than 600 classifications. In 2010, it was bought from DMGT by Printing Investments Ltd, reuniting the publication with Buy&Sell, an Irish classifieds magazine previously owned by Loot.
