= Aldourie Castle =

19th-century mansion incorporating a 1626 castle, by Loch Ness, Highland, Scotland

Coordinates: 57°24′14″N 4°19′47″W

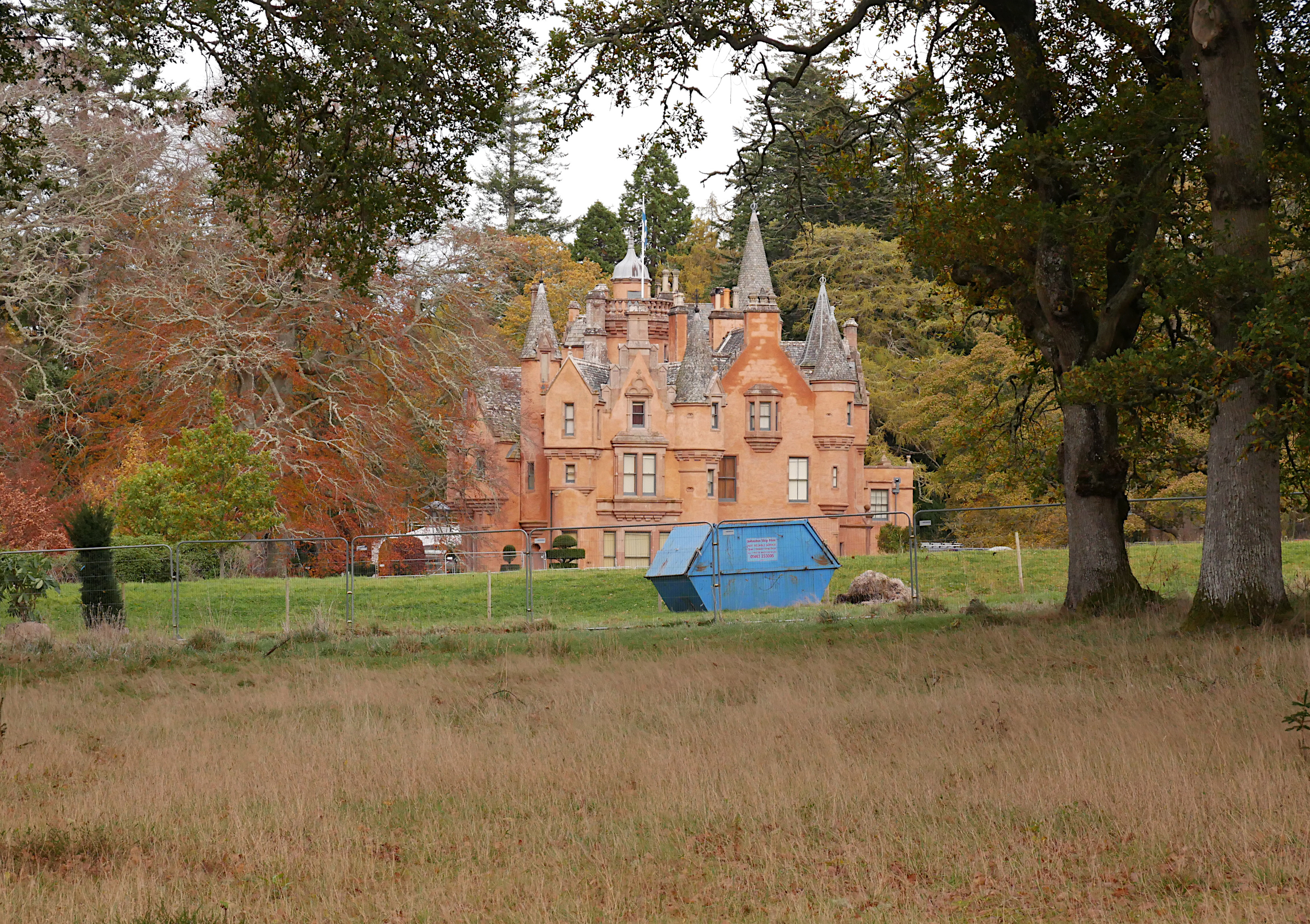
- Aldourie Castle in 2020
- Interactive map of Aldourie Castle

Inventory of Gardens and Designed Landscapes in Scotland
- Official name: Aldourie Castle
- Designated: 30 March 2003
- Reference no.: GDL00011

Aldourie Castle is in Scotland, situated on Strath Dore, between the southern banks of Loch Ness and the Glen leading onto Drumashie Moor. The parkland of 38.9 hectares (96 acres) extends northeast and southeast of the house. Lying close to the village of Aldourie, it originally consisted of a rectangular main block, with a round tower at the south-west corner. In the 1860s, William Fraser-Tytler extended the castle in all directions, including a balustraded round tower, oriel windows, scroll-sided dormers, turrets, corbels, rope-moulded stringing and gunloops. It underwent extensive restoration work between 2002 and 2010, and again in 2017, when the original walled Victorian kitchen garden and surrounding grounds were revived, with help from students from the National Trust for Scotland. The gardens and parkland are included in the Inventory of Gardens and Designed Landscapes in Scotland.

== History ==
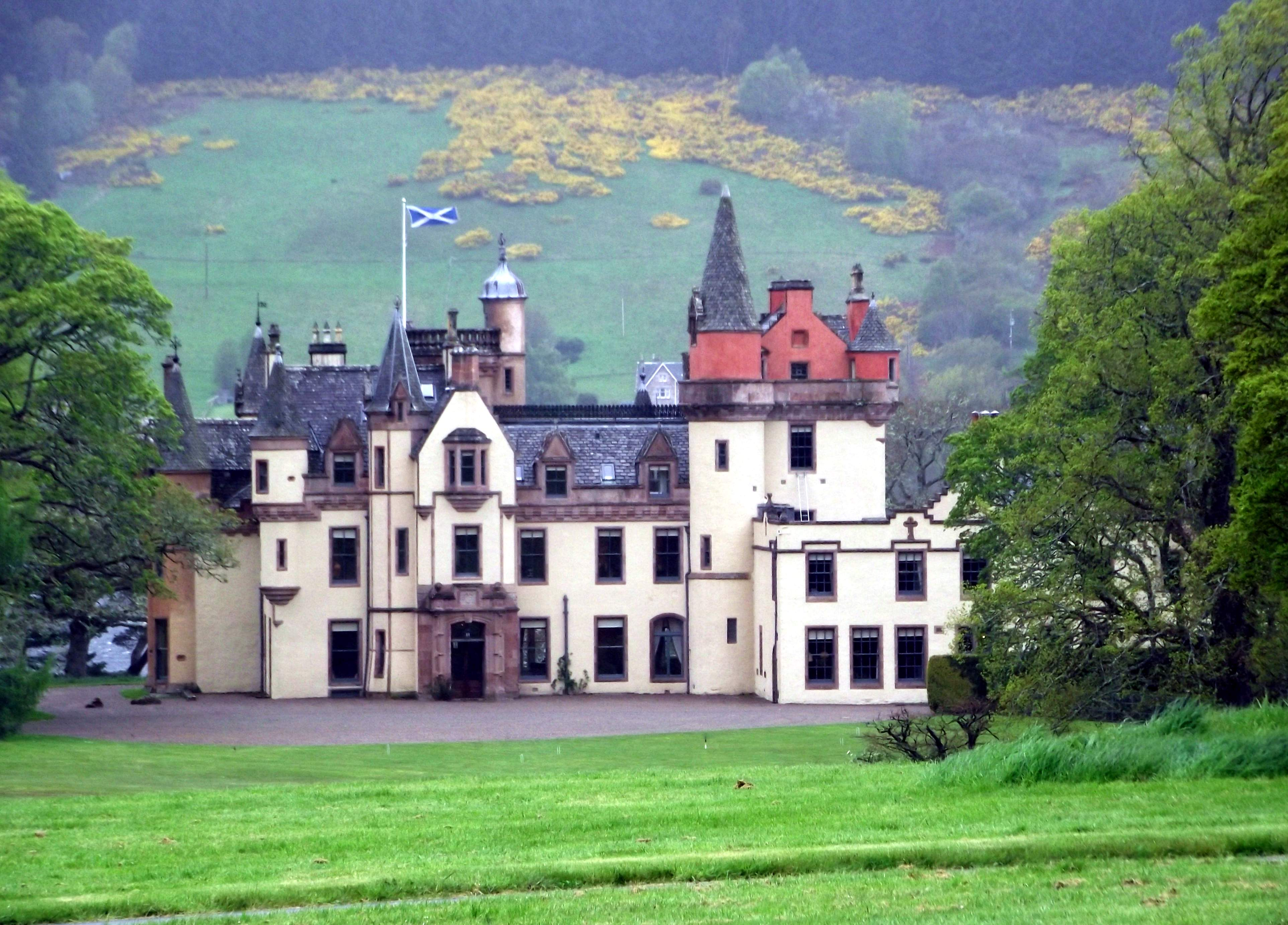
Aldourie Castle, landward side

Aldourie Castle on Loch Ness was first recorded as a laird's house in 1625 as a property of Mackintosh of Kyllachy in Nairnside. Lying close to the small, crofting village of Aldourie, it originally consisted of a rectangular main block, with a round tower at the south-west corner, and was extended to the west in 1839 with a two-storey wing. In the 1860s, William Fraser-Tytler was responsible for transforming Aldourie into the historic castle it is today. He commissioned Mackenzie & Matthews to extend the house “in all directions, parading the full repertoire of early 17th-century baronialism, including a balustraded round tower cribbed from Castle Fraser, Grampian, oriel windows, scroll-sided steeply pedimented dormers, candle-snuffered turrets, corbelling, rope-moulded stringcourses and gunloops”. Further additions in 1902–4 by Sir Robert Lorimer included a wing at the south-east.

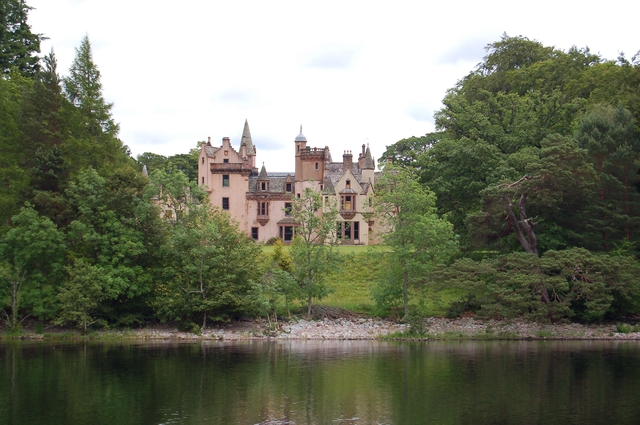
Aldourie Castle on the banks of Loch Ness

In 1893, the Lovat Scouts army unit were reputedly founded at Aldourie by Lord Lovat and Edward Fraser-Tytler.

In 2015 Danish billionaire Anders Holch Povlsen bought the castle for £15 million as part of his portfolio of 12 Scottish estates making him the largest landowner in Scotland. The castle is available to rent.

== Geography ==
Aldourie Castle is situated on Strath Dores, between the southern banks of Loch Ness and the Glen leading onto Drumashie Moor. Aldourie Castle is set on a level terrace above the loch, with its main lawn facing north-west out onto the loch and the slopes of Creag Dherag. The parkland of 38.9 hectares (96 acres) extends to the north-east and south-east of the house and is enclosed by woodland. South of the parkland, a series of agricultural fields are enclosed by a regular pattern of shelterbelts, screening Aldourie Farm. The extent of the parkland remains unchanged since the mid 19th century.

== Present day ==
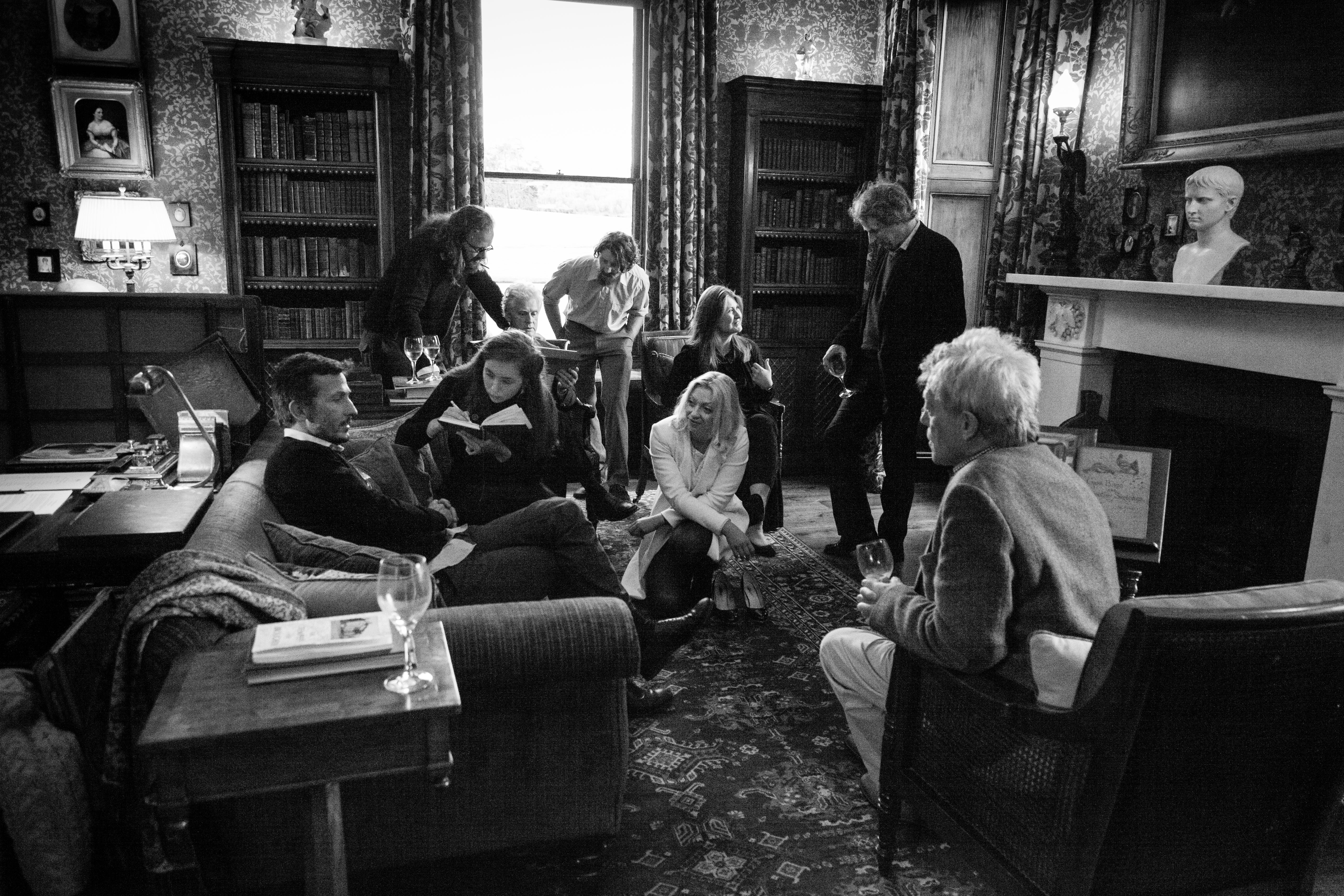
Alpine Fellows at Aldourie Castle, 2014

Aldourie Castle is now classed as the only inhabitable castle on Loch Ness and it is now used primarily for private use castle stays. On site activities include clay pigeon shooting, archery and chartered boat tours. Now a Category A listed building in Scotland, Aldourie Castle underwent extensive restoration work between 2002 and 2010 under the ownership of Roger Tempest, to restore specialist paintwork, murals and metalwork fixtures throughout the Castle. An extensive Estate Conservation Project started in 2017 to revive the original walled Victorian kitchen garden and surrounding grounds, involving renowned landscape architect Tom Stuart Smith with help from students from the National Trust for Scotland. Concurrently, extensive architectural additions to the Castle and Estate, including a new Boathouse, as well as the sensitive repair of the historic Steadings building have been led by Ptolemy Dean Architects. The gardens and parkland are included in the Inventory of Gardens and Designed Landscapes in Scotland.
