= Yvonne Lui =

Hong Kong based businesswoman and philanthropist (born 1976)

Yvonne Lui Pui-Lam 呂姵霖
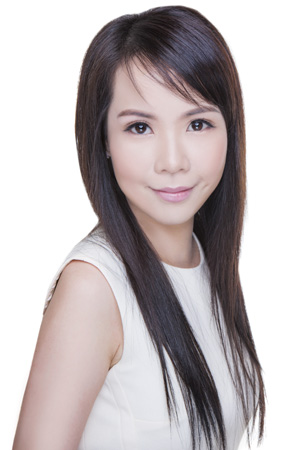
- Lui in 2014
- Born: Lui Lai-Kwan (Chinese: 呂麗君); 1976 (age 49–50); Hong Kong
- Citizenship: Hong Kong, China
- Education: King's College London, University of London, Canford School
- Partner: Joseph Lau (2002–2014)
- Children: 3
- Website: yvonneluitrust.org

Yvonne Lui Pui-Lam (Chinese: 呂姵霖; born Lui Lai-Kwan Chinese: 呂麗君; pinyin: Lǚ Lìjūn; born 1976) is a Hong Kong–based businesswoman and philanthropist.

== Early life ==
Born in Hong Kong, Lui received her Bachelor of Science and PhD in chemical engineering from King's College London.

== Philanthropy ==
Lui’s charitable goals focus on education, health and science, which are closely tied to her personal background and the interests of her two children.

In 2008, she was named executive vice-president of the executive committee of Youth Movement. The body encouraged grass root support of the Olympic Games, and participation in sporting events. Lui established a disaster relief wing overseeing operations during earthquakes in Sichuan in 2008 and Chinghai in 2010. She has also sponsored local medical and sanitation clinics for remote communities in Hebei Province.

She is a trustee of Peking University and the University of International Business and Economics (Beijing).

Since 2011, she has started to support the Beijing International Ballet and Choreography Competition (Beijing IBCC) and became the vice president of the organising committee. Beijing IBCC aims to provide another world-renowned platform for aspiring dancers, professionals and members of national ballet dance troupes to participate at this biennial event. Judging panel of the most recent event in July 2019 included Julio Bocca (Artistic Director of Uruguay National Ballet).

In Hong Kong, Lui is honorary president of Hong Kong Federation of Women, a non-profit organization of over 100,000 members that subsidises local organisations for women as well as chairing several non-governmental organisations, such as acting as the honorary chairman of Hong Kong United Youth Association.

In 2013, Lui founded the Yvonne Lui Trust to encourage science and education initiatives within her community and beyond.

In 2017, she jointly launched the Lui-Walton Innovators Fellowship Programme with S. Robson Walton, chairman of the board (retired) for Walmart Stores and Conservation International, a global non-governmental organization promoting conservation and sustainability. The programme aims to recognise world leaders, first-in-class scientists and conservationists dedicated to saving nature and building a healthier and more productive planet. Christiana Figueres, former executive secretary of the United Nations Framework Convention on Climate Change; Ólafur Ragnar Grímsson, former president of Iceland and chairman of the Arctic Circle (organization); and Anote Tong, former president of Kiribati are among the ones awarded the fellowship so far. Lui is a board member of Conservation International.

An environmentalist, Lui penned an op-ed article published in 2017 in a Hong Kong newspaper, the South China Morning Post, urging concerted efforts in her community including the government to step up their efforts to tackle climate change.

In recent years, Lui has developed an interest in running and has been seen promoting the sports through her own experience and support in running-related charity events.
