= Scoot.co.uk =

United Kingdom business directory website

Scoot
- Website type: Business directory
- Available in: English
- Website: www.scoot.co.uk
- Launched: 1998

Scoot is a United Kingdom business directory website. It was one of the highest profile casualties of the rise and fall of internet companies during the internet boom at the beginning of the 21st century falling from a value of £2.5 billion in 2000 to £5 million in 2002.

== History ==
The origins of Scoot began in March 1993 when businessman Nigel Robertson bought the freephone number 0800 192 192 from British Telecommunications for an estimated value of just £100. Robertson had spotted the potential of acquiring a freephone number similar to BT's own directory enquiries number of 192. BT spent three years trying to recover the number in legal battles but were finally forced to admit defeat in May 1996.

Robertson and his business partner Jonathan Bushby renamed their company (then known as Timeload) as FreePages and set itself up as a rival directory enquiries service a few months later. In February 1996 the firm was listed on the AIM stock market following a reverse takeover of Blagg plc. In 1998 Robertson stepped down as CEO of FreePages and sold out of the company, leaving it under the direction of Robert Bonnier, a Dutch financier who had joined FreePages in February 1995.

Bonnier renamed the company Scoot, and the firm began to aggressively promote itself with television advertising in the UK and a link-up with French media giant Vivendi to promote itself in Europe. In June 2000 it purchased classified advertising newspaper Loot for £189.9m. However, the company failed to reach its hoped-for user numbers and ran out of cash. Following heavy losses in the first half of 2001, Bonnier quit as chief executive in June 2001.

The European side of the business was bought out by Vivendi, its major shareholder, and in August 2001 the company was forced to sell Loot, its only profit-making business, to Daily Mail and General Trust for £45m in order to raise money to keep going. In June 2002 the company, which had told its creditors it would run out of money by the end of the month, sold the bulk of its UK business to BT for £5 million - just two years previously the company had been valued at over £2.5 billion. The remainder of the business reverted to its original name of Timeload, but less than a year later it was acquired by the Coe Group, a video surveillance company.

In 2005, Enable Media Ltd acquired a 20-year licence from BT to operate Scoot, with its 2,500 local advertisers, for a rumoured £10m. BT maintains an economic interest, based upon future revenues. Enable Media was bought by ITV in 2006, for £3m, to expand its local broadband TV service. It had revenues of 3m. In 2009 they sold Enable Media to Touch Local Ltd.

In 2014 Touch Local (including Enable Media which owns the Scoot brand) was sold to US company web.com.
