= Canford School =

Public school in Canford Magna near Wimborne Minster, Dorset, England

Coordinates: 50.7898°N 1.9538°W

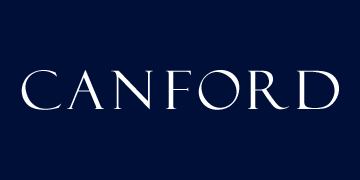

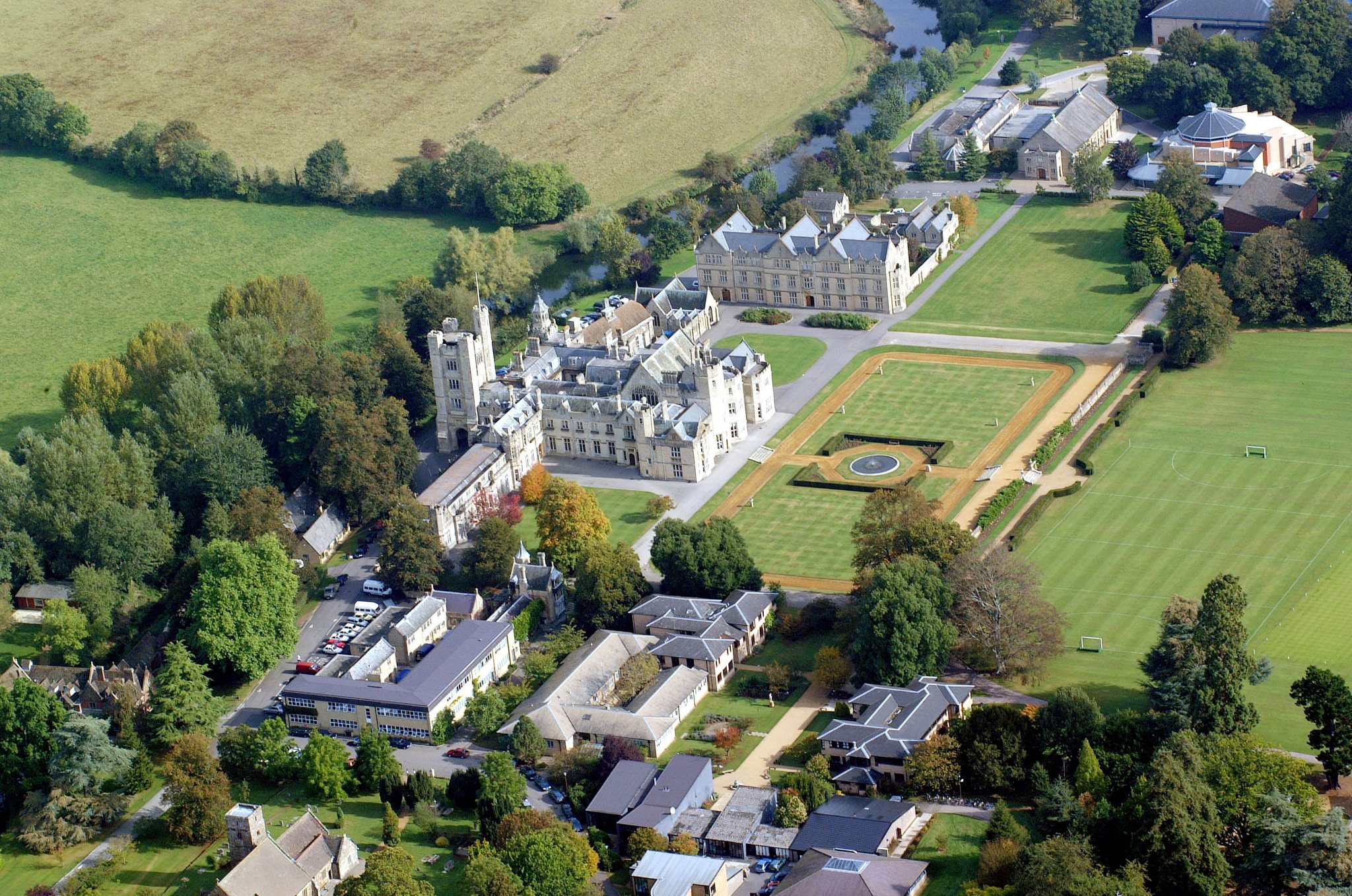

Location
- Canford Magna; Wimborne, Dorset, BH21 3AD; England

Information
- Type: Public school Private boarding school
- Motto: Latin: Nisi Dominus Frustra; Unless the Lord in Vain
- Established: 1923
- Department for Education URN: 113922 Tables
- Head Master: Chris Wheeler
- Staff: c. 100
- Gender: Co-educational
- Age: 13 to 18
- Enrolment: 660
- Houses: 10
- Colours: Blue & White
- Publication: The Canfordian; The Week; The Blue Bubble
- Alumni: Old Canfordians
- Website: www.canford.com

Canford School is a public school (English fee-charging boarding and day school for pupils aged 13–18). Situated in 300 acres of parkland near to the market town of Wimborne Minster in Dorset, south west England, it is one of the largest schools by area.

The school is a member of the Headmasters' and Headmistresses' Conference. Called a public school, Canford's fees for the 2023/24 academic year were £15,173 per term for boarders. In September 2025, Canford was shortlisted for the 2026 'Tatler Schools Guide', along with Eton, Caterham, Brighton and Gresham's, as one of the five best public schools in the country.

The school has an enrolment of 660 students, the highest in its history, aged between 13 and 18 spread across seven boarding and three day houses. Canford School counts among its alumni high-ranking military officers, pioneers in industry, computing, and economics, as well as senior figures in the Arts and Sciences.

== History ==
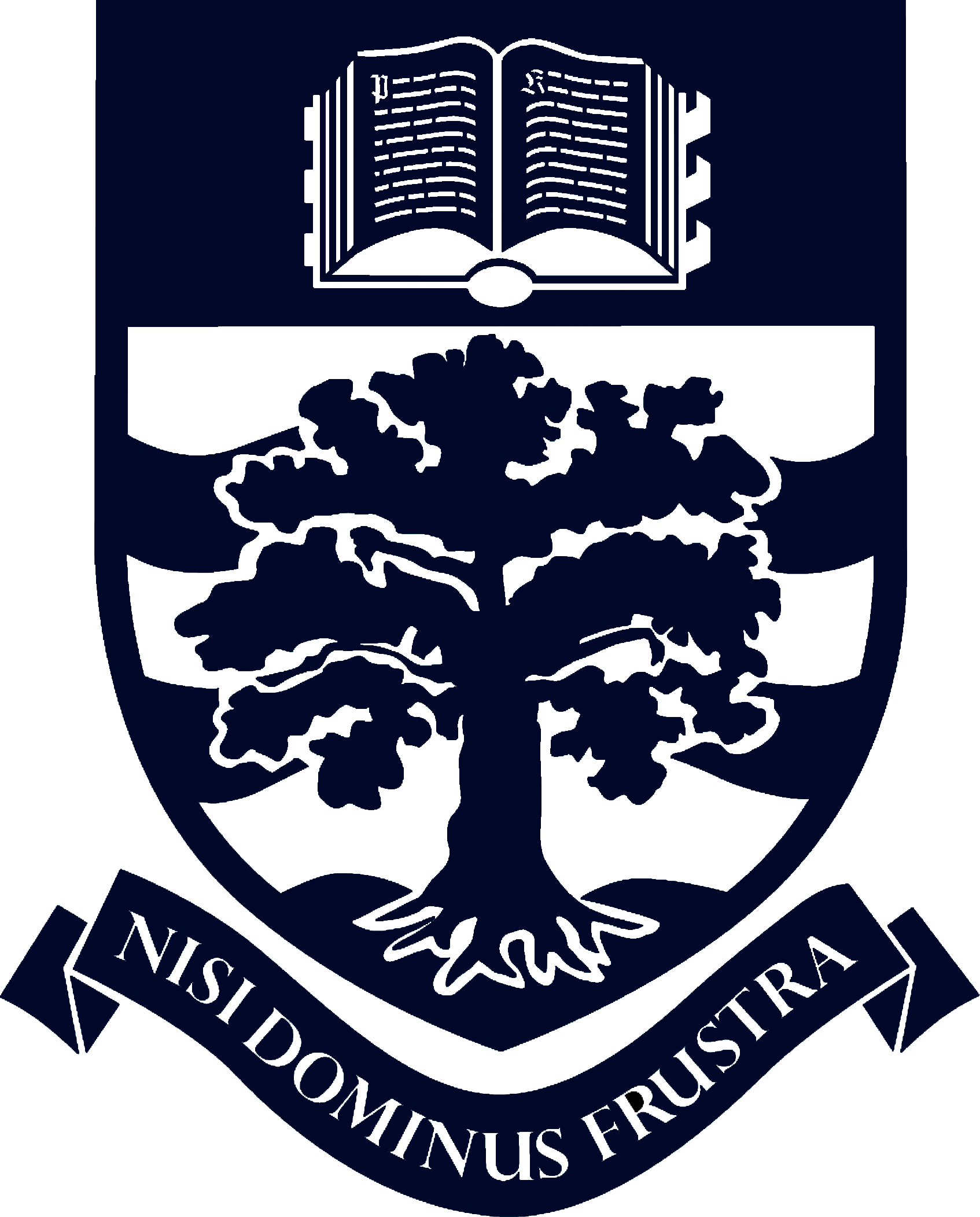
Canford School emblem

Canford Manor was particularly associated with John of Gaunt, 1st Duke of Lancaster – the third of five surviving sons of Edward III of England. The Duke exercised great influence over the English throne during the minority of Richard II's reign, and the ensuing periods of political strife. Records suggest the Canford Manor was used as a principal residence of John of Gaunt for some time. Of that early period, only the Norman church and 14th century refectory known as John O' Gaunt's Kitchen remains. The main building, constituting the nucleus of the school, was designed by Edward Blore and later by Sir Charles Barry in the early and mid 1800s. The school itself was founded in 1923, having been "provided with a nucleus of boys and staff from a small private school in Weston-super-Mare".

== Results ==
In 2024, 73% of GCSE grades were 9–7, and 53% of results were A*/A at A level.

== Inspection ==
As of 2024, the school's most recent integrated inspection by the Independent Schools Inspectorate was in 2012. The headline judgement for each section except Governance was Excellent; the headline judgement for Governance was Good. There was a focussed inspection of compliance, jointly with educational quality, in 2018. All compliance standards were met, and educational quality and children's personal development were judged excellent. There was a regulatory compliance inspection in 2022, at which the school was found to meet all the standards.

== Assyrian frieze ==
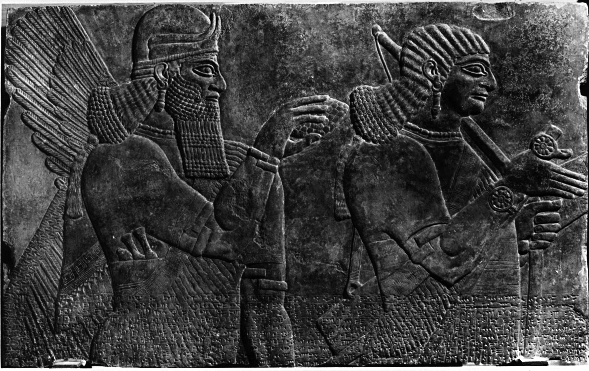
Assyrian relief rediscovered at Canford School.

In 1992, a lost Assyrian stone relief was rediscovered on the wall of "the Grubber". Although it is at first sight rather unlikely that such a valuable item should be found on the wall of a school tuck shop, the history of the school explains how the relief came to be there. It had been brought back from the site of Nimrud in northern Mesopotamia (Iraq) by Sir Austen Henry Layard along with other antiquities which were displayed at Canford before it was a school. Originally Canford had been a private country house (known as Canford Manor), designed by Edward Blore and improved by Sir Charles Barry, and the residence of Layard's cousin and mother-in-law, Lady Charlotte Guest and her husband, Sir John Josiah Guest. At that time, the building now known as the Grubber had been used to display antiquities and was known as "the Nineveh Porch". It was however believed by the school authorities to be a plaster copy of an original which had been lost overboard during river transit and little attention was paid to it after the school was established. A dartboard was even hung in the Grubber close to where the frieze was displayed. It was John Russell of Columbia University who identified the frieze as an original, one of a set of three relief slabs taken from the throne room of Assyrian King Assurnasirpal II (883–859 BC). A new plaster copy now stands in the foyer of the Layard Theatre at Canford and a number of "Assyrian Scholarships" are available, funded from the sale proceeds which also helped pay for the construction of a new sports facility.

The original relief is now part of the collection of the Miho Museum in Japan.

== The Layard Theatre ==
The Layard Theatre is situated inside Canford School and is open to the public.

== The Bourne Academy ==
Since September 2010 Canford School is the sponsor of The Bourne Academy, a state-funded school in Bournemouth.

== Sport ==
=== Real Tennis ===
The school is one of four in the United Kingdom with a real tennis court (the others being The Oratory, Radley and Wellington College). It is unique among these schools in that its court dates back to 1879 when it was a country house, whereas the others have all been newly built for the schools since 1990.

=== Rowing ===
The school has a rowing club, the Canford School Boat Club, which is based on the River Stour. The club is affiliated to British Rowing (boat code CAN) and has produced three British champion crews at the 2002 British Rowing Championships, 2008 British Rowing Championships and 2010 British Rowing Championships.

== Notable alumni ==
Former pupils of Canford School are known as Old Canfordians. Notable alumni include:

- Henry Lloyd (1911–2001), Anglican priest, Dean of Truro
- Stephen Ward (1912–1963), osteopath involved in the Profumo affair
- Hector Maclean (1913–2007), decorated RAF officer during Battle of Britain
- Sir George Clark, 3rd Baronet (1914–1991), Unionist politician in Northern Ireland
- Sir Ralph Verney, 5th Baronet (1915–2001) British Army Officer and Politician
- Sir Ashley Bramall (1916–1999), leader of the Inner London Education Authority, 1970–1981
- Charles Maclean of Duart, Baron Maclean (1916–1990), Chief Scout of the United Kingdom, 1959–1971, Chief Scout of the Commonwealth, 1959–1975, and Lord Chamberlain, 1971–1984
- Lieutenant Colonel Hilary Hook (1917–1990), Soldier and 'Home from the Hill' star
- Ted Cooke-Yarborough (1918–2013) physicist and WW2 radar and computer pioneer
- Paul Feiler (1918–2013), abstract artist
- Mike Randall (1919–1999), editor of the Daily Mail and Sunday Times
- David Sheldrick (1919–1977), Anglo-Kenyan conservationist
- John Barnes (1920–2008), Historian
- Peter Hare (1920–2001), cricketer
- Rear Admiral John Templeton-Cotill (1920–2011), Naval Officer
- Hector Monro, Baron Monro of Langholm (1922–2006), Conservative politician
- Michael Medwin (1923–2020), actor
- Alexander Paton (1924–2015), physician and author of ABC of Alcohol
- Stuart Symington (1926–2009), cricketer
- John Douglas, 21st Earl of Morton (1927–2016), Deputy Lieutenant of West Lothian
- Michael Ash (1927), mathematician, brewer, and inventor of the Easy Serve Draught Guinness
- Iain Campbell (1928–2015), cricketer
- Rutherford Aris (1929–2005), chemical engineer, Regents Professor Emeritus
- David Littman (born 1933), historian and human rights advocate
- Sir John Drummond (1934–2006), arts administrator, former controller of BBC Radio 3
- General Sir Brian Kenny (1934–2017)
- Second Lieutenant Paul Benner (1935–1957), awarded the George Cross
- Stan Brock (1936), television presenter, philanthropist
- Anthony Bryer (1937–2016), historian
- Air Chief Marshall, Sir Roger Palin (born 1938)
- Simon Preston (born 1938), organist, conductor, composer
- Stephen Rubin (born 1938), founder of Pentland Industries (Hunter, Speedo, Berghaus, Ellesse, etc.)
- Derek Jarman (1942–1994), film director and gay rights activist
- Ian Bradshaw (born 1940s), Photographer and winner of the World Press Photo Award
- Sir Henry Cecil (1943–2013), champion race horse trainer
- Admiral Sir Ian Garnett (born 1944), naval officer
- Rear Admiral Sir Jeremy De Halpert (born 1945), Naval Secretary
- Tim Stevenson (born 1948), Lord Lieutenant
- Simon Crowcroft (born 1950), Connétable of St Helier
- David Docwra (born 1953), cricketer and educator
- Alan Hollinghurst (born 1954), Booker Prize winning author
- Peter Parker (born 1954), Author, Journalist, and Fellow of the Royal Society of Literature
- Christopher Edward Berkeley Portman, 10th Viscount Portman (born 1958), British peer and property developer
- Owen Bennett-Jones, journalist, 'Newshour'
- Sir Philip Moor (born 1959), judge of the High Court of England and Wales
- Nigel Robertson (born 1962), entrepreneur, founder of FreePages plc
- Simon Hilton (born 1967), music video director
- Nick Robertson (born 1967), co-founder and former CEO of ASOS
- Tom Holland, (born 1968), novelist and popular historian
- Nick Borton (born 1969), Commander Allied Rapid Reaction Corps
- Stephen Phillips (born 1970), Conservative politician
- Giles Duley (born 1971), photojournalist
- James Le Mesurier (1971–2019), Founder of White Helmets
- Miranda Cooper (born 1975), formerly the singer 'Moonbaby', songwriter and director of the company Xenomania
- William Villiers, 10th Earl of Jersey (born 1976)
- Yvonne Lui (born 1977), property magnate, philanthropist
- Nicholas Ashley-Cooper, 12th Earl of Shaftesbury (born 1979)
- Ben Gollings (born 1980), England rugby sevens player
- Alex Hibbert (born 1986), polar explorer
- Ore Oduba (born 1986), Presenter and sports journalist, 2016 Winner of Strictly Come Dancing
- Chloe-Jasmine Whichello (born 1991), reality TV star
- Brianna Stubbs (born 1991), GB rower

== See also ==
- Bryanston School, Dorset
- Sherborne School, Dorset

== Sources ==
- Sumption, Jonathan (2009). The Hundred Years War: Divided houses. Volume III. Faber and Faber. ISBN 978-0571138975.
