= The Bourne Academy =

State-funded secondary school in Bournemouth, Dorset

Location
- Hadow Road; Bournemouth, Dorset, BH10 5HS; England
- Coordinates: 50°45′23″N 1°54′02″W

Information
- Type: Academy
- Local authority: Bournemouth, Christchurch and Poole
- Trust: Canford School
- Department for Education URN: 136125 Tables
- Ofsted: Reports
- Principal: Mark Avoth
- Gender: Co-educational
- Age: 11 to 18
- Enrolment: 900
- Website: https://www.thebourneacademy.com/

The Bourne Academy is a co-educational state-funded secondary school and sixth form located in Bournemouth, Dorset, England. It serves students aged 11 to 18 and is situated at Hadow Road, Bournemouth, BH10 5HS.

== History ==
=== 1937–1967: East Howe Senior School ===
The school was built in 1937 as East Howe Senior School for boys and girls. The original East Howe School was built in 1912 by Dorset County Council when the area was rural. The school was brought under the control of Bournemouth Local Education Authority in 1931 when Bournemouth extended its boundaries to include the area. The school grew rapidly and the seniors moved to their new building along Hadow Road (supposedly named after Henry Hadow of the Hadow Report of 1926). During World War II, the school was used as a hospital. The original 1912 school is now used as a youth centre.

=== 1967–1999: Kingsleigh Secondary School ===
In 1967 the boys and girls schools merged to become Kingsleigh Secondary School. The local infant school and junior school were also renamed Kingsleigh. A number of buildings were added to the school until it was put in special measures.

=== 2000–2009: Kings High School ===
In 2000 the school was renamed Kings High School. The school was led by Mr Gareth Jones who, within five years, turned Kings High into Bournemouth's most improved school – with 60% of its pupils achieving five A* to C's, compared with 24% in 2001. Kings High School was led by Alyn Fendley up until 2010, the year the school was renovated and renamed 'The Bourne Academy'.

=== 2010–present: The Bourne Academy, Sixth Form and BSF ===
On 1 September 2010, Kings High became The Bourne Academy, which still operates out of the old Kings High site, which was renovated. The school is also sponsored by Canford School.

The Academy is underwent a government-funded revival of schools all around the country. This was called BSF (Building Schools for the Future). The nominated BSF Team from Kings High attended conferences in Bournemouth and London along with other schools around Bournemouth. The main east and west wing building is pre World War II, but was refurbished in Quarter 2 and 3 of 2012. The Academy has built a new science block, design and technology block and a new canteen and dance studio called "The Hub", the newly refurbished main building and Sports Hall and extension of the Science block. The Academy then underwent a 10 million pound building work project completed in August 2013, The Academy now also has a new Maths and English block, additional food room, sixth form building, library and reception.

On September 2013, The Academy introduced Sixth Form, which offers academic (A-Levels), vocational (BTECs), or a mix of both. Students have access to a purpose-built Sixth Form Centre, which includes a large common room, study centre and modern classrooms. Academic performance is strong: for example, in 2024 the pass rate for A-levels and BTECs was 99% and around 54% of those qualifications were awarded at grades equivalent to A*/A. Entry criteria reflect the expectation of commitment: for the academic pathway (three or four A-Levels) applicants typically require six GCSEs at grade 5 or above (including English Language and Maths), plus relevant subject-specific requirements.

On March 19 2026, William, Prince of Wales visited the academy as part of his ongoing mission to tackle youth homelessness through his Homewards initiative. He met with students and staff to discuss how early intervention in schools can prevent homelessness before it starts.

== Facilities ==
=== Classrooms ===
The school has over 40 classrooms, divided into subject areas STEM, AWE, HU or C&E.

- STEM: Science, Technology, Engineering & Mathematics

Classrooms for Mathematics, Engineering, Technology, Design, Child Development, Computing, Business Studies, Food & Nutrition & Sciences. There are 22 STEM Classrooms.

- AWE: Performing Arts

Used for Dance, Drama, Art, Design, Photography, Physical and Outdoor Education, Media & Music.

- HU: Humanities

Used for Criminology, Geography, History, Psychology, Religious Studies, Sociology & Travel and Tourism. There are 9 HU Classrooms. HU 8 & HU 9 are equipped with Kitchens for use during Food & Nutrition lessons.

- C&E: Communication & Enquiry

Used for English & Modern Foreign Languages (MFL). There are 9 C&E Classrooms

There are 4 rooms with computers: Maths IT; STEM 17; STEM 18; AWE 5. There are also multiple Scientific Laboratories on site which are used for practicals, demonstrations and experiments.

=== Outdoor Education ===
The school has ample Physical Education and Sports facilities and areas. Most notably, the large field at the back of the school site. There is also a MUGA, an Outdoor Education site, a Long Jump Sandpit and a seasonal Running Track which is painted onto the field during Summer Term. The Outdoor Education site is often used by students training for their Duke of Edinburgh Award. Additionally, the school has a large sports hall for indoor games and activities, though it is often unable to be used due to examinations taking place in there. Outdoor and Indoor changing facilities are also located onsite. Sports Day occurs annually during July, allowing every student and staff member to participate in a sport.
