= Paul Benner =

British army officer

- Born: 14 April 1935; Blackheath, London, England
- Died: 1 July 1957 (aged 22); Grossglockner, Austria
- Military career
- Allegiance: United Kingdom
- Branch: British Army
- Service years: 1956–1957
- Rank: Second Lieutenant
- Service number: 448764
- Awards: George Cross

Michael Paul Benner, GC (14 April 1935 – 1 July 1957), known as Paul Benner, was a British Army officer of the Corps of Royal Engineers who was posthumously awarded the George Cross for his actions in an alpine rescue attempt at Grossglockner, Austria.

He was born in Blackheath, London, on 14 April 1935 and educated at Canford School in Dorset. The award of the George Cross was published in The London Gazette on 17 June 1958.
