= Peter Hare (cricketer) =

English cricketer

Personal information
- Full name: Peter Macduff Christian Hare
- Born: 12 March 1920; Wokingham, Berkshire, England
- Died: 14 June 2001 (aged 81); Shaftesbury, Dorset, England
- Batting: Right-handed
- Role: Wicket-keeper

Domestic team information
- Years: Team
- 1939: Dorset
- 1947: Oxford University

Career statistics
Competition	First-class
Matches	1
Runs scored	39
Batting average	39.00
100s/50s	–/–
Top score	39
Catches/stumpings	2/–
- Source: Cricinfo, 5 May 2020

Peter Macduff Christian Hare (12 March 1920 – 14 June 2001) was an English first-class cricketer and educator.

Hare was born at Wokingham in March 1920. He was educated at Canford School, before going up to Worcester College, Oxford. He played minor counties cricket for Dorset in 1939, with Hare trialling for Oxford University in 1940, however both his studies and cricket were interrupted by the Second World War. He served in the war and was commissioned as a second lieutenant in the Royal Artillery in May 1941. Following the war, he continued his studies at Oxford and made a single appearance in first-class cricket for Oxford University against Leicestershire at Oxford in 1947. Batting once in the match, he was dismissed for 39 runs in the Oxford first innings by Jack Walsh.

After graduating from Oxford, Hare became a schoolmaster at Rugby School for thirty years, before finishing his teaching career at Hanford School. He died at the Westminster Memorial Hospital at Shaftesbury in June 2001.
