= Troels Holch Povlsen =

Danish businessman

- Born: 9 September 1949 (age 76); Risskov, Aarhus, Denmark
- Occupations: Founder, Bestseller
- Spouse: Merete Bech Povlsen
- Children: 4, including Anders Holch Povlsen

Troels Holch Povlsen (born 9 September 1949) is a Danish businessman, founder of the fashion chain Bestseller.

== Early life ==
Troels Holch Povlsen was born on 9 September 1949 in Risskov, Aarhus. His father was a regional head of social services (socialinspektør).

== Career ==
Povlsen and his wife Merete Bech Povlsen co-founded Bestseller in Ringkøbing, Denmark, in 1975. In 2002, he co-founded furniture store HAY with Mette and Rolf Hay.

His son Anders Holch Povlsen inherited his parents' business, Bestseller, when he was 28 years old. He eventually became its CEO and sole owner. According to Forbes, Anders Holch Povlsen has a net worth of $16.8 billion, as of September 2026.

Povlsen is a director of Bestseller.

The Povlsen family interests are managed by the company Nine United, which has its headquarters in Horsens, Denmark.

== Property ==
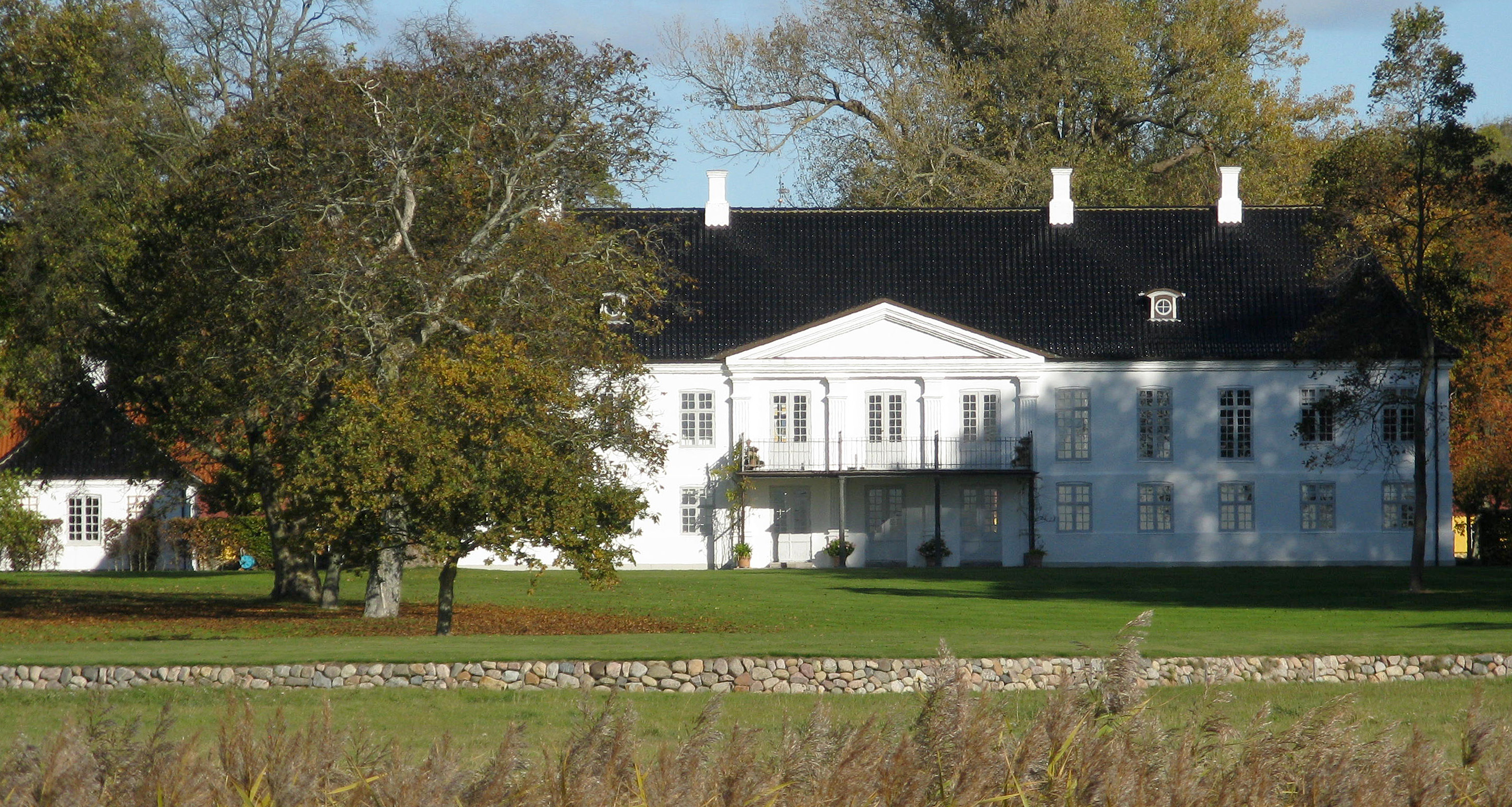
Gyllingnæs, 2009

He owns Lindencrone Mansion, a large historic building in central Copenhagen, which was the British embassy from 1898 to 1980. In 1995, he bought Gyllingnæs Manor in Odder, south of Aarhus, a large estate established by an Englishman John Smith in 1801. Early 2026, Povlsen bought the historic Tyrrestrup estate near Horsens.

In London, he owns 16 Queen Anne's Gate since 2006, as well as no. 34. No. 16 is a Grade I listed house that was the former home of John Fisher, 1st Baron Fisher, and of William Smith where there are commemorative blue plaques in both names. The restoration of the house won a Georgian Group award.

== Honours ==
In 2000, Povlsen was appointed a Knight of the Order of the Dannebrog.

== Personal life ==
Povlsen and his wife Merete Bech Povlsen live in Denmark. They have two sons Anders and Niels, both of whom work for the family company.
