= STYLEPIT =

STYLEPIT.COM A/S
- Company type: Public
- Traded as: Nasdaq Copenhagen: STYLE
- Industry: Clothing
- Founded: 2000
- Headquarters: Copenhagen, Denmark
- Number of locations: 20 countries (2013)
- Area served: Europe
- Key people: Mike Tomkins (CEO)
- Services: Online retailing

STYLEPIT, previously known as SmartGuy Group is an online retailer of fashion apparel, launched in 2000. STYLEPIT has been named a growth gazelle by Danish business daily Børsen for six consecutive years, and has received a number of awards, including the Danish e-Commerce Award, as well as European e-Commerce Awards.

In addition to Denmark, the company has local offices or actual subsidiaries in 20 European markets. Bestseller acquired 10% of the shares, when the company became quoted on the Danish stock exchange Nasdaq OMX in late 2012. One year later, Bestseller increased their ownership to 26%. In January 2014, STYLEPIT moved their warehouse to Szczecin, Poland.
