= ASOS plc =

British online fast-fashion retailer

- Formerly: Winsupply Public Limited Company (2–15 June 2000); AsSeenOnScreen Holdings plc (2000–2003)
- Type: Public
- Traded as: LSE: ASC
- Industry: Clothing industry; Online shopping
- Founded: 3 June 2000; 26 years ago
- Founders: Nick Robertson; Andrew Regan; Quentin Griffiths; Deborah Thorpe
- Headquarters: London, England
- Area served: Worldwide
- Key people: Jørgen Lindemann (Chairman); José Antonio Ramos Calamonte (CEO); Anders Holch Povlsen (26.41% stake)
- Products: Clothes; Shoes; Accessories; Beauty; Gifts
- Revenue: ▼£2,240.3 million (2026)
- Operating income: ▲£18.8 million (2026)
- Net income: ▲£49.8 million (2026)
- Owners: Frasers Group (29.26%); Bestseller A/S (26%)
- Number of employees: 2,579 (2026)
- Subsidiaries: ASOS.com Limited; Topshop (25% stake); Topman (25% stake); Miss Selfridge; HIIT
- Website: asosplc.com

ASOS plc (/ˈeɪsɒs/ AY-soss) is a British online fast-fashion and cosmetic retailer. The company was founded in 2000 in London, primarily aimed at young adults. The website sells over 850 brands as well as its own range of clothing and accessories, and ships to all 196 countries from fulfilment centres in the United Kingdom, the United States, and Europe.

ASOS originally stood for AsSeenOnScreen with the tagline "Buy what you see on film and TV" because it exclusively sold imitations of clothing from those mediums (for example, Brad Pitt's red leather jacket from the 1999 film Fight Club).

ASOS's headquarters are in Camden Town, at Greater London House, with additional offices in Berlin and Birmingham. As of 2013, their main fulfilment centre is in Barnsley, South Yorkshire, where they employ 3,500 workers. The customer care department is based in Leavesden. British retail group Frasers Group is ASOS's largest stakeholder, with a 29.26% share. The Danish company Bestseller A/S, owned by the business magnate Anders Holch Povlsen, also has a large stake, with a 26% share.

The company is listed on the London Stock Exchange and is a constituent of the FTSE 250 Index.

== History ==
=== 2000–2004 ===
ASOS was established on 3 June 2000, by Nick Robertson, Andrew Regan, Quentin Griffiths, and Deborah Thorpe. In 2001, ASOS was admitted to the Alternative Investment Market (AIM) on the London Stock Exchange. In 2003, ASOS shareholders agreed to change the names of AsSeenOnScreen Holdings PLC and AsSeenOnScreen Limited to ASOS plc and ASOS.com Limited. In 2004, the company reported a maiden profit, with sales almost doubling in its first half. In 2004, ASOS introduced their own label for women's clothing.

=== 2005–2012 ===
In 2005, the Buncefield Fuel Depot explosion led to the closure of the business for six weeks and £5m of stock was lost. In 2008, ASOS debuted kidswear on its site, however the branded market subsequently suffered declines at the expense of fast-growing own-label kidswear offers. In 2010, ASOS announced it would no longer offer kidswear, to concentrate on its core young adult fashion market.

In the final quarter of 2010, ASOS launched three international online shops in Germany, France and the US. In November 2010, ASOS launched its marketplace platform for boutiques, vintage collectors, individuals and designers to trade from virtual market stalls to customers globally.

In September 2011, ASOS launched three more sites in Australia, Italy and Spain. In 2012, ASOS opened its first international office in Sydney, Australia, followed by an office in New York. Later on, the company launched its first drama-game show series, called #DIGIDATING, starring AJ Odudu. It was billed as an Internet dating show with backstage drama.

=== 2013–2019 ===
In 2013, ASOS opened its first office outside the South East, in Birmingham. Later in 2013, ASOS recalled belts contaminated with radioactive cobalt-60. ASOS in Russia and China were launched in the same year. In 2014, a fire in the Barnsley warehouse prevented them from taking orders for almost three days. During the 2014 Formula One season, ASOS was a sponsor of the McLaren Formula One team. In 2015, ASOS had over 4,000 employees and was the UK's largest independent online and fashion beauty retailer.

In September 2016, an investigative report from BuzzFeed News alleged poor working conditions at ASOS's warehouse. However, company spokespersons contended that the isolated complaints reported in the BuzzFeed article were not reflective of the general working conditions there.

In April 2019, ASOS informed its clients through email that the company is looking into ways of changing its easy returns policy, after research showed customers were manipulating the easy return process. The company also admitted that the previous return policy was environmentally costly.

=== 2020–present ===
In April 2020, during the COVID-19 pandemic, ASOS was accused by some staff and workers unions of "playing Russian roulette with people's lives" by failing to adequately enforce preventative measures in their Grimethorpe, Barnsley site. It was claimed that warehouse staff could not safely operate whilst maintaining social distancing, that the staff felt unsafe and that ASOS's product was not actually essential, thus not meeting the UK Government's recommendation that only essential workplaces remain open. The company disputed these claims, claiming they had sufficiently changed their operation to comply. Barnsley Council also inspected the site and found that the company was complying.

In October 2020, ASOS Marketplace announced that it would not be charging commission rates on small business transactions to provide support through the COVID-19 pandemic for sellers.

In April 2021, ASOS has partnered with delivery company DPD of DPDgroup to allow shoppers the option to donate unwanted clothing to charity. In June 2021, ASOS launched a partnership with Lush Fresh Handmade Cosmetics.

In February 2021, it was announced that ASOS was to acquire the Topshop, Topman, Miss Selfridge, and HIIT brands from collapsed Philip Green's Arcadia Group. On 4 February, the three former Arcadia Group brands became wholly owned subsidiaries of ASOS, with 300 head-office staff members from Arcadia and Topshop/Topman Limited.

In November 2021, Ian Dyson, former Marks & Spencer finance director, became chair.

Following the Russian invasion of Ukraine in 2022, ASOS suspended operations in Russia.

In January 2023, ASOS's share value UK dropped by 70% compared to the previous year, mainly due to online shopping and shipping of the products. Consumers were less likely to purchase items online due to delivery problems since Christmas.

In June 2023, it was reported that the Frasers Group had accumulated a stake of nearly 9% in ASOS.

In November 2023, The Guardian reported that Asos's business was "unsustainable" describing it as a "fast-fashion also-ran". In September 2024, Asos introduced a return fee of £3.95 starting in October which risked alienating customers. The BBC reported that customers had reacted to the decision with anger with returns to Asos common due to the company's inconsistent sizing.

Quentin Griffiths, one of the co-founders, died on 9 February 2026, after falling from the 17th floor of a block of flats in Pattaya, Thailand.

In October 2026, customers were sent a notification from hackers on the company app indicating that their data may have been compromised.

== Technology ==
ASOS has applied several digital technologies in its retail processes.

In 2017, the company developed Style Match feature, which allows users to upload images and receive clothing suggestions based on visual similarity using computer vision. The tool was integrated into the ASOS mobile app and was also available through the Enki shopping assistant on platforms such as Facebook Messenger and Google Assistant.

In early 2018, ASOS implemented a deep learning–based personalization. The system uses collaborative filtering and content-based models to generate product and customer embeddings.

In April 2018, ASOS partnered with Zeekit, an Israeli technology company, to develop augmented reality-based virtual fitting room technology. Zeekit's system displays how garments appear on different body types through AI-powered simulation. In 2019, ASOS launched the "See My Fit" feature, which presents clothing on digital representations of different body shapes without relying on traditional photography.

== Digital marketing ==
In November 2009, ASOS claimed a ratio of one Twitter follower to eight Facebook fans to 100 active e-mail subscribers. Their 2008 report pointed out that nearly 10% of sales could be directly attributed to email marketing.

In 2017, ASOS launched a campaign intended to take full advantage of the Instagram Stories feature, encouraging users to upload videos of purchased ASOS products. 3 million people interacted with the video in the UK. ASOS uses the #AsSeenOnMe hashtag and any use of the hashtag adds the photos to an ASOS online database.
