= Anders Holch Povlsen =

Danish businessman (born 1972)

- Born: 4 November 1972 (age 53); Mikladalur, Faroe Islands
- Education: Anglia Ruskin University
- Occupation: Owner of Bestseller
- Known for: Largest individual private landowner in the UK
- Spouse: Anne Storm-Pedersen
- Children: 7 (4 living)
- Parent(s): Troels Holch Povlsen; Merete Bech Povlsen

Anders Holch Povlsen (born 4 November 1972) is a Danish billionaire, CEO and sole owner of the international retail clothing chain Bestseller (which includes Vero Moda and Jack & Jones), a company founded by his parents. He is the largest shareholder in the British internet fashion retailer ASOS and second-largest in German internet clothing retailer Zalando. He is the largest individual private landowner in the United Kingdom, due to vast tracts of land he owns in the Scottish Highlands.

As of February 2026, Povlsen was listed as the richest Dane with a net worth estimated at US$13.5 billion.

== Early life ==
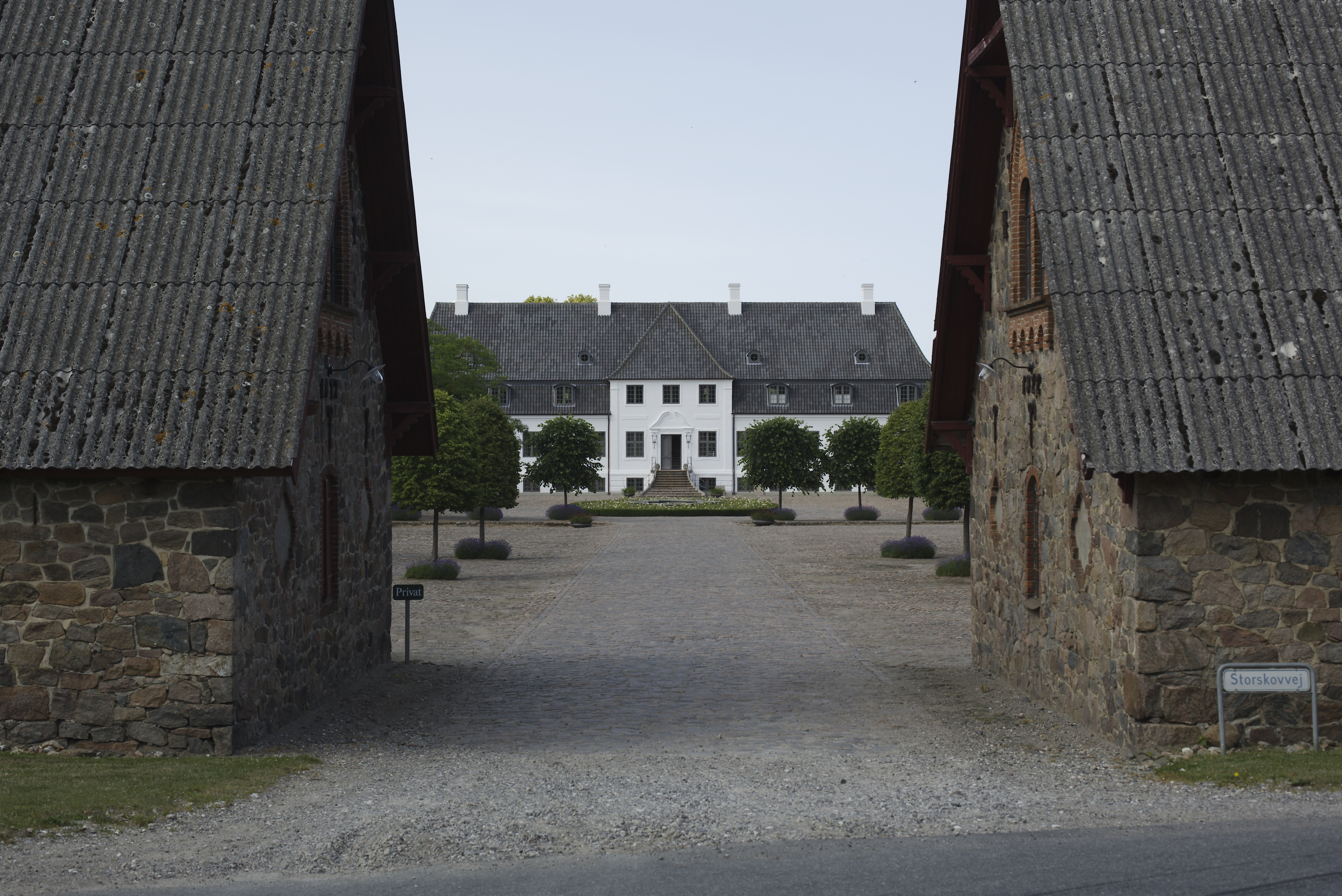
Constantinsborg Estate in Aarhus, Denmark

Anders Holch Povlsen was born in 1972 to Troels Holch Povlsen and Merete Bech Povlsen. The family's first clothing store opened in 1975 in the small Danish town of Brande, with a population of 7,000.

Other outlets soon followed. Povlsen was 28 when his father made him the sole owner of Bestseller. The family has an interest, along with two Danish partners, in Bestseller Fashion Group China, a company that designs its own collections for 5,000 stores in China.

Povlsen has a BA degree from Anglia Ruskin University, and his alma mater gave him an honorary doctorate in 2015.

== Business career ==
In 2013, Povlsen bought a 10% stake in the German internet clothing retailer Zalando, becoming its third largest shareholder. Povlsen already had a 27% stake in ASOS.com, the largest UK internet-only fashion retailer.

In October 2019, Povlsen's net worth was estimated as US$8.0 billion, making him the wealthiest person in Scotland.

Heartland A/S, which is Povlsen's holding company, is seated in Aarhus. Besides Bestseller, they own shares in FC Midtjylland, STYLEPIT and Nemlig.com and are in the process of acquiring Karup Airport.

== Landowner ==
=== Scotland ===
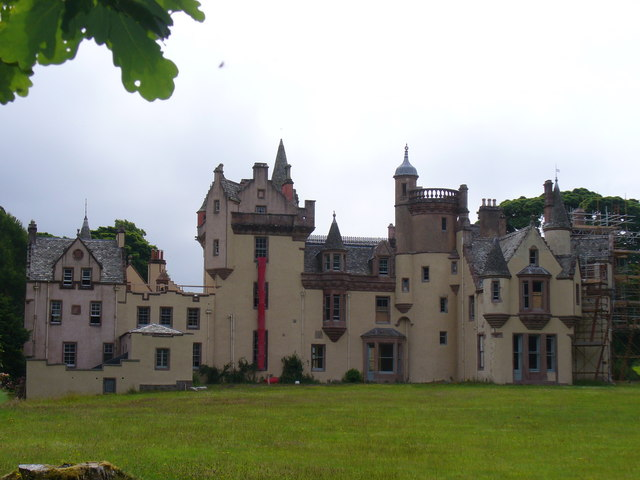
Aldourie Castle

Povlsen began purchasing land in Scotland in 2006, when he purchased the Glenfeshie estate in Inverness-shire. By 2018, Povlsen owned 11 estates in Scotland totaling 89,000 hectares (221,000 acres), making him its largest landowner.

This includes two large estates he purchased in 2012, the 9,700-hectare (24,000-acre) Ben Loyal, and 7,300-hectare (18,000-acre) Kinloch Lodge, as well as a 12,000-hectare (30,000-acre) estate near Fort William that he bought in 2008. Povlsen overtook the Buccleuch Estates as Scotland's largest private landowner in 2013, when he bought the 8,100-hectare (20,000-acre) Gaick Estate in Inverness-shire. In addition, Povlsen had bought land in the Borders specifically to trade it with the Forestry Commission, in return for 400 hectares (1,000 acres) of woodland to add to his 17,000-hectare (43,000-acre) Glenfeshie Estate, south of Aviemore. Povlsen expanded Glenfeshie by buying the 4,000 acres (1,600 ha) neighbouring farm of Killiehuntly.

In 2014, he bought Aldourie Castle on the banks of Loch Ness for £15 million.

He also bought the Eriboll estate in Sutherland.

In 2017, through his real estate company AAA United, Povlsen bought the Jenners building on Princes Street in Edinburgh, reportedly for £53 million. He renovated the Victorian-era building, restoring its facade, in a project that began in 2020.

He plans to combine his adjoining estates and re-wild them. Aggressive techniques to facilitate tree growth were adopted after 2004 and into the 2020s in Glenfeshie within the Cairngorms National Park.

In 2018, Povlsen lost a legal challenge seeking to stop the development of a 22-turbine wind farm, Creag Riabhach, in Sutherland in the northern Highlands; the Court of Session declined his bid to halt the project.

=== Denmark ===
In Denmark, Povlsen owns and resides at the old Constantinsborg Estate west of Aarhus, along with substantial farmland and forests.

=== Romania ===
Povlsen has bought land in Romania's Carpathian Mountains to create a wilderness reserve for the surviving wolves, bears and lynx.

== Personal life ==
Povlsen is married to Anne Holch Povlsen (formerly Anne Storm-Pedersen), and the couple had four children: Alma, Agnes, Astrid and Alfred. Alma, Agnes and Alfred were killed at the Shangri-La Colombo hotel during the 2019 Sri Lanka Easter bombings, when the family was on holiday there. They had twin girls less than a year later on 11 March 2020, and another son on 29 September 2021.

== Private jet controversy ==
In 2024, Povlsen was among several individuals scrutinized by Danish news broadcaster DR for the environmental impact of his private jet usage. Povlsen owns the company Blackbird Air, which operates two private jets used for both business and personal travel, with over 1,100 flights recorded between 2020 and 2023. Despite Bestseller's public commitment to sustainability and reducing climate impact, these flights reportedly emit 17 times more CO_{2} per passenger compared to commercial flights. Bestseller has defended the flights as necessary for business, citing security and logistical reasons. However, the private jets were demonstrably used for extensive private commuting to Aldourie Castle, including transportation for American singer Lionel Richie who performed for Povlsen's 50th birthday. Critics, including climate activists, have labeled this as excessive, particularly given the Bestseller's stated environmental goals.

Scottish media reported on the private jet usage, pointing out the contrast with Povlsen's environmental donations and rewilding projects in Scotland. An NGO cited by the Daily Record described this as a case of greenwashing. As of October 2024, Povlsen's spokesperson declined to comment.
