= Hadsund Municipality =

Former municipality in Denmark

Coordinates: 56.7174°N 10.1103°E

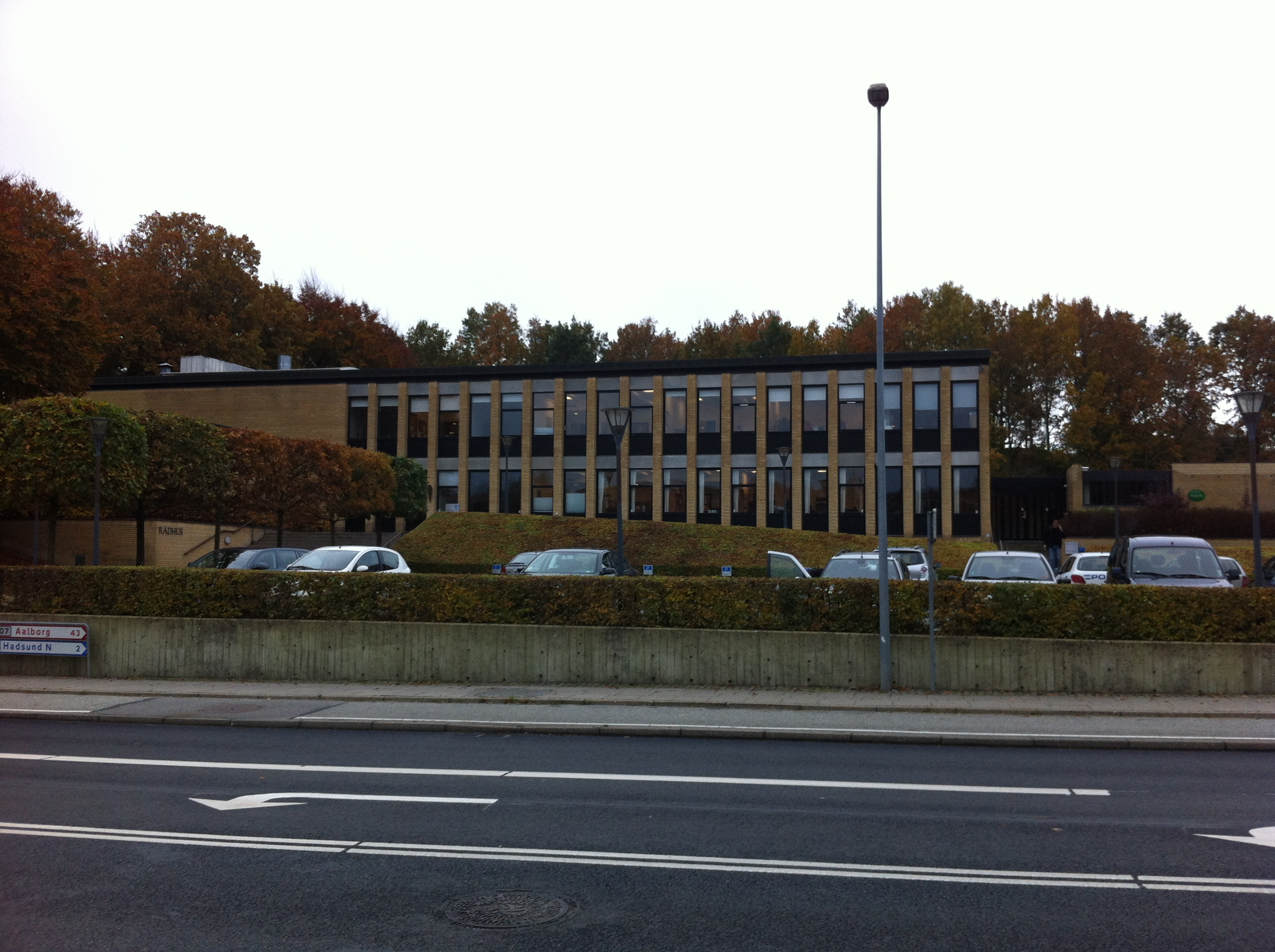
Hadsund City Hall.

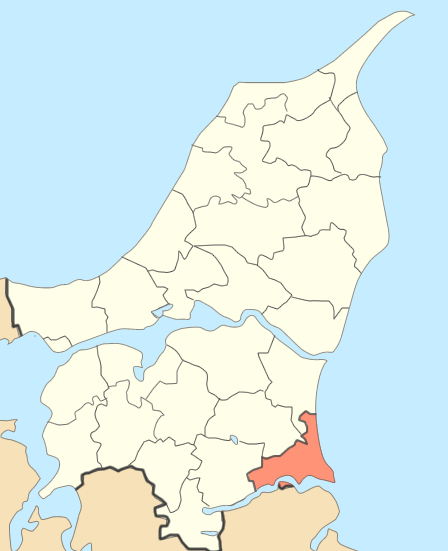
Hadsund Municipality

Hadsund Municipality was a municipality (Danish, kommune) in North Jutland County on the Jutland peninsula in northern Denmark until 1 January 2007 the municipality covered an area of 170.28 km^{2} (65.75 sq mi), and had a total population of 10,914 (2004). Its last mayor was Karl Christensen, a member of the Social Democrats (Socialdemokraterne) political party.

The largest city and the site of its municipal council was the town of Hadsund.

On 1 January 2007 Hadsund Municipality ceased to exist as the result of Kommunalreformen ("The Municipality Reform" of 2007). It was merged with former Arden and Hobro municipalities, and parts of Mariager, Aalestrup and Nørager municipalities to form the new Mariagerfjord Municipality. This created a municipality with an area of 723.63 km^{2} (279.40 sq mi) and a total population of 43,049 (2005). The new municipality belongs to the Region Nordjylland ("North Jutland Region").
