= The Old Maskinsnedkeri =

Historic industrial building in Denmark

Coordinates: 56°42′57.89″N 10°6′58.71″E

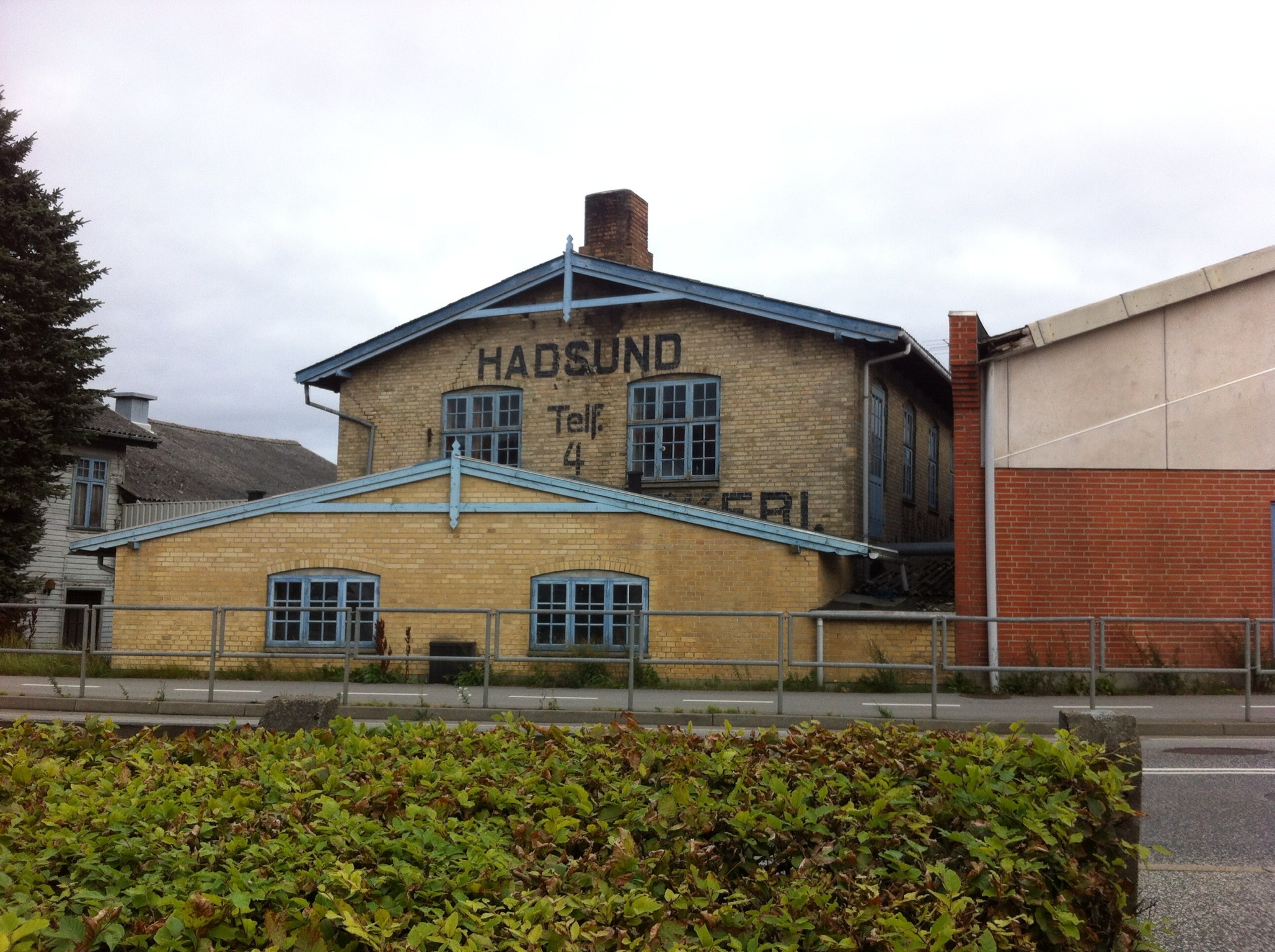
Det Gamle Maskinsnedkeri

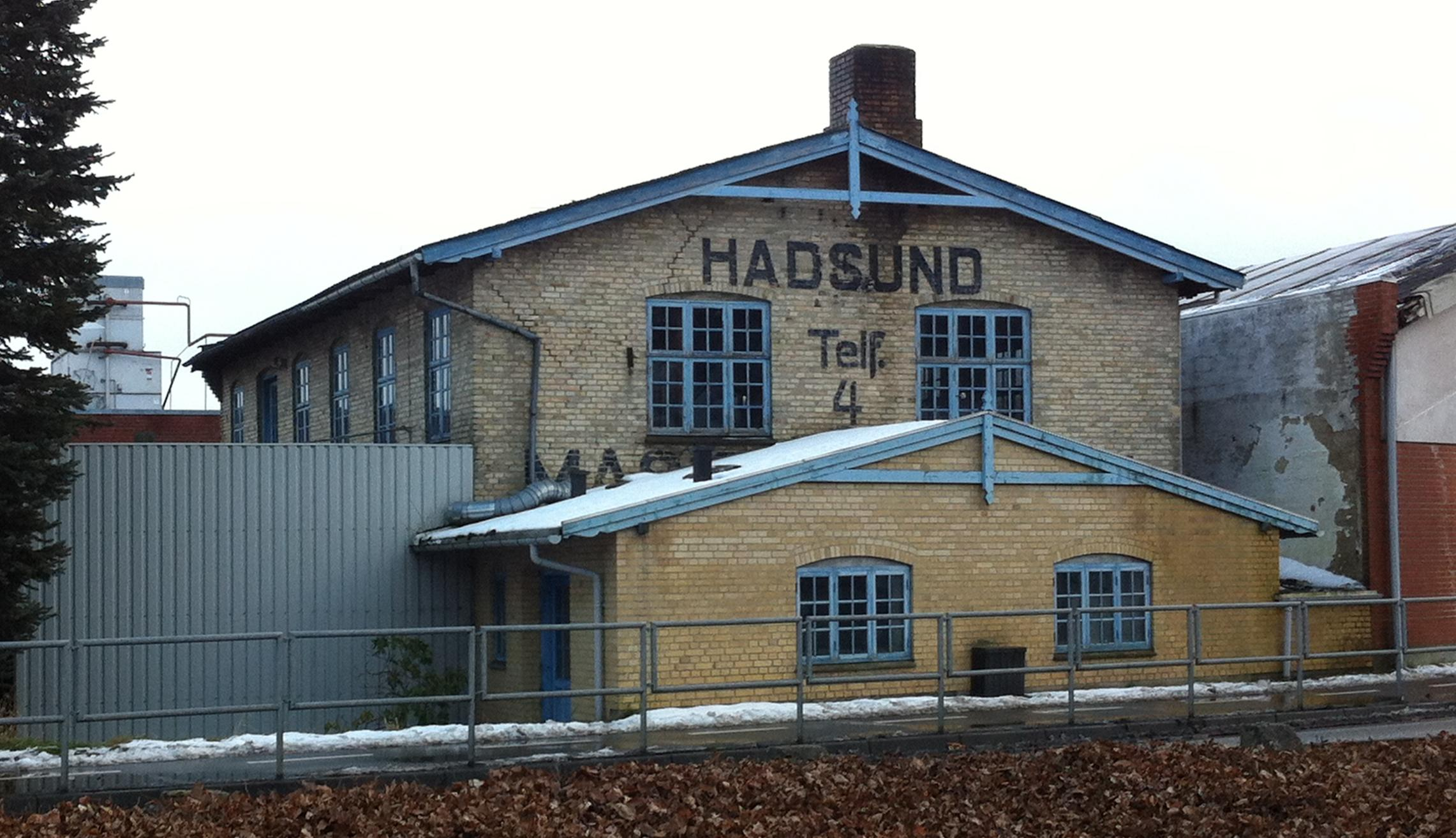
Det Gamle Maskinsnedkeri

The Old Maskinsnedkeri (Danish: Det Gamle Maskinsnedkeri) is a historic industrial building in Hadsund, Denmark. Maskinsnedkeri was built in 1920. The building is built of yellow brick and is the first sign of industry in Hadsund. It was one of the first companies in the city to have electric-powered machines, which ran on direct current.

The ground floor had the big machines, the top was the workshop with work benches and hand tools. The building is an example of contemporary technical innovations related to electricity. Since it was the city's first machine shop and was the fourth in the city to have a phone, which is seen on the gable, which is advertised for it. The gable is the most photographed gable, in Hadsund. The buildings are the last vidensbyrd about the industry that was located inside the city.

The building i located parallel and oriented north–south. It is strategically located by the railroad, so they lay near the railway station Hadsund North Station and the harbor. The Old Maskinsnedkeri and Hadsund Antique form a wall facing the railroad, with the buildings together creating a course along the track.

== Demolition ==
In January 2013, it emerged that Mariagerfjord municipality planned to demolish the building, along with Hadsund Antique and a disused slaughterhouse owned by Danish Crown AmbA which closed on 1 November 2012. The Old Maskinsnedkeri and Hadsund Antique will be replaced by a large parking lot with the possibility of a gas station.

Hadsund's citizens are reportedly unhappy that the building will be demolished. Melanie Simick, a member of the Socialist People's Party, believes that the main building should be preserved and requires action of the City Council. Simick declared that the building is "incredibly beautiful" and part of "Hadsund's soul".
