= Visborg, Denmark =

Visborg
- Village
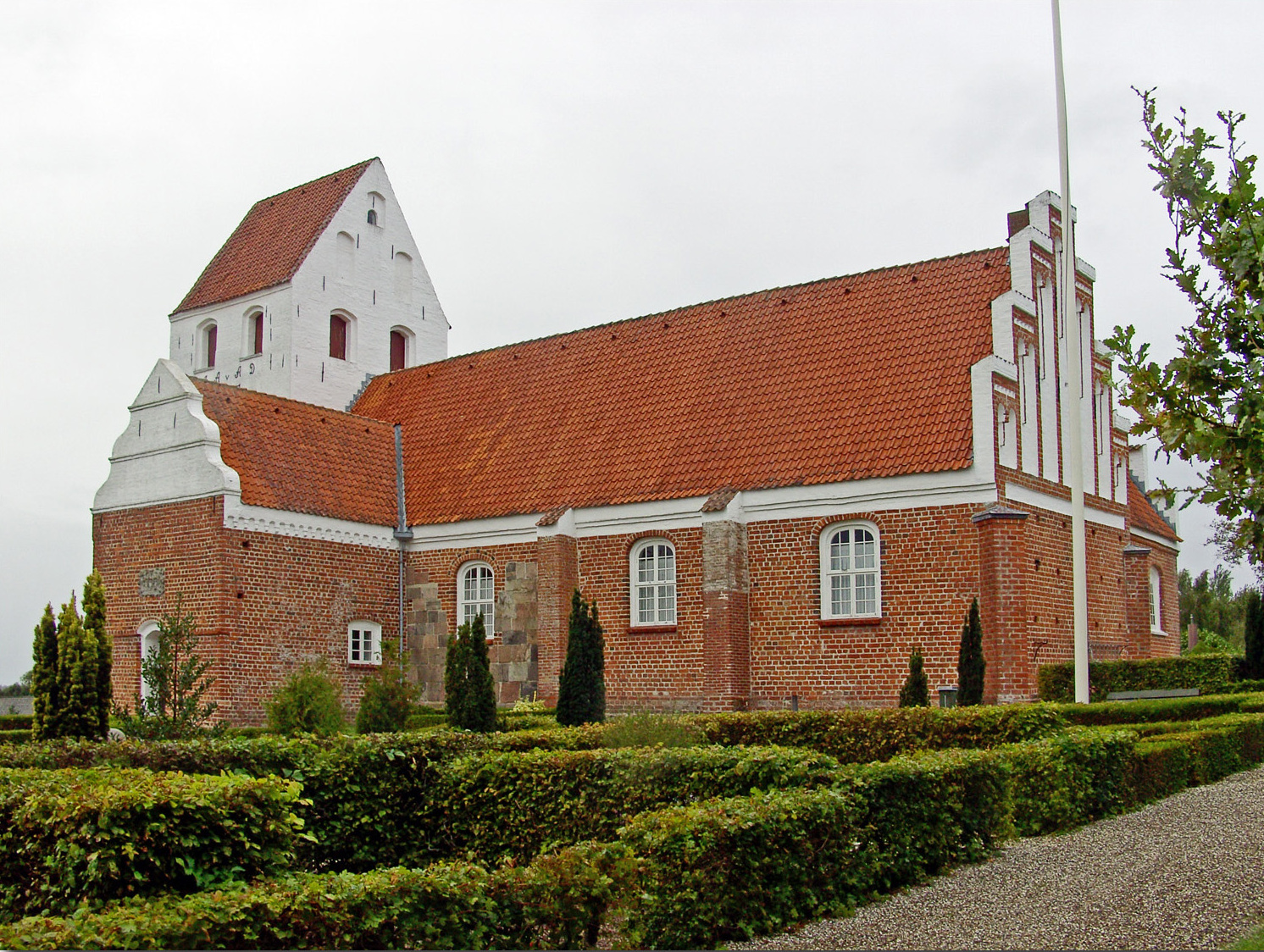
- Visborg church

- Location within Denmark
- Coordinates: 56.7331°N 10.1483°E
- Country: Denmark
- Region: North Denmark (Nordjylland)
- Municipality: Mariagerfjord

Population (2026)
  - Total: 413
- Time zone: UTC+1 (Central European Time)
  - Summer (DST): UTC+2 (Central European Summer Time)

Visborg is a commuter town in Mariagerfjord Municipality, a few kilometers east of Hadsund. In the geographic region of the Jutland peninsula known as Himmerland in northern Denmark. The town has a population of 413 (1 January 2026).
