= Hadsund Airport =

Hadsund Airport Hadsund Flyveplads
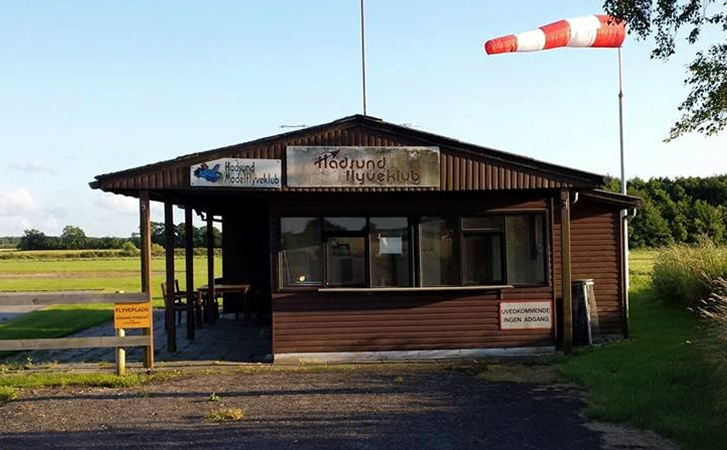
- IATA: none; ICAO: EKHS

Summary
- Airport type: Private
- Owner: Mariagerfjord Flyveklub
- Serves: Hadsund, Denmark
- Location: Buddun, Mariagerfjord
- Coordinates: 56°45′21.37″N 10°13′57.37″E
- Website: ekhs.dk

Map
- Location within Denmark

Runways
Direction	Length		Surface
Direction	m	ft	Surface
09/17	650	2,133	Grass

Hadsund Airport was an aerodrome in Hadsund, Denmark.
