= Astrup =

Astrup may refer to:

== Places in Denmark ==
- Astrup, Hjørring
- Astrup, Mariagerfjord
- Astrup, Ringkøbing-Skjern

== Surname ==
- Mette Marit Astrup (1760–1834), Danish actress
- Nils Astrup (1778–1835), Norwegian politician
- Hans Rasmus Astrup (1831–1898), Norwegian politician; government minister 1885–87
- Eivind Astrup (1971–1895), Norwegian explorer and writer
- Henny Astrup (1876–1961), Norwegian actress
- Thorvald Astrup (1876–1940), Norwegian architect
- Nikolai Astrup (1880–1928), Norwegian artist, great-grandson of Nils Astrup
- Poul Bjørndahl Astrup (1915–2000), Danish clinical chemist
- Heidi Astrup (born 1972), Danish Olympic handball player
- Nikolai Astrup (politician) (born 1978), Norwegian minister
