= Hadsund Syd =

District of Hadsund, Denmark

Coordinates: 56°43′N 10°07′E

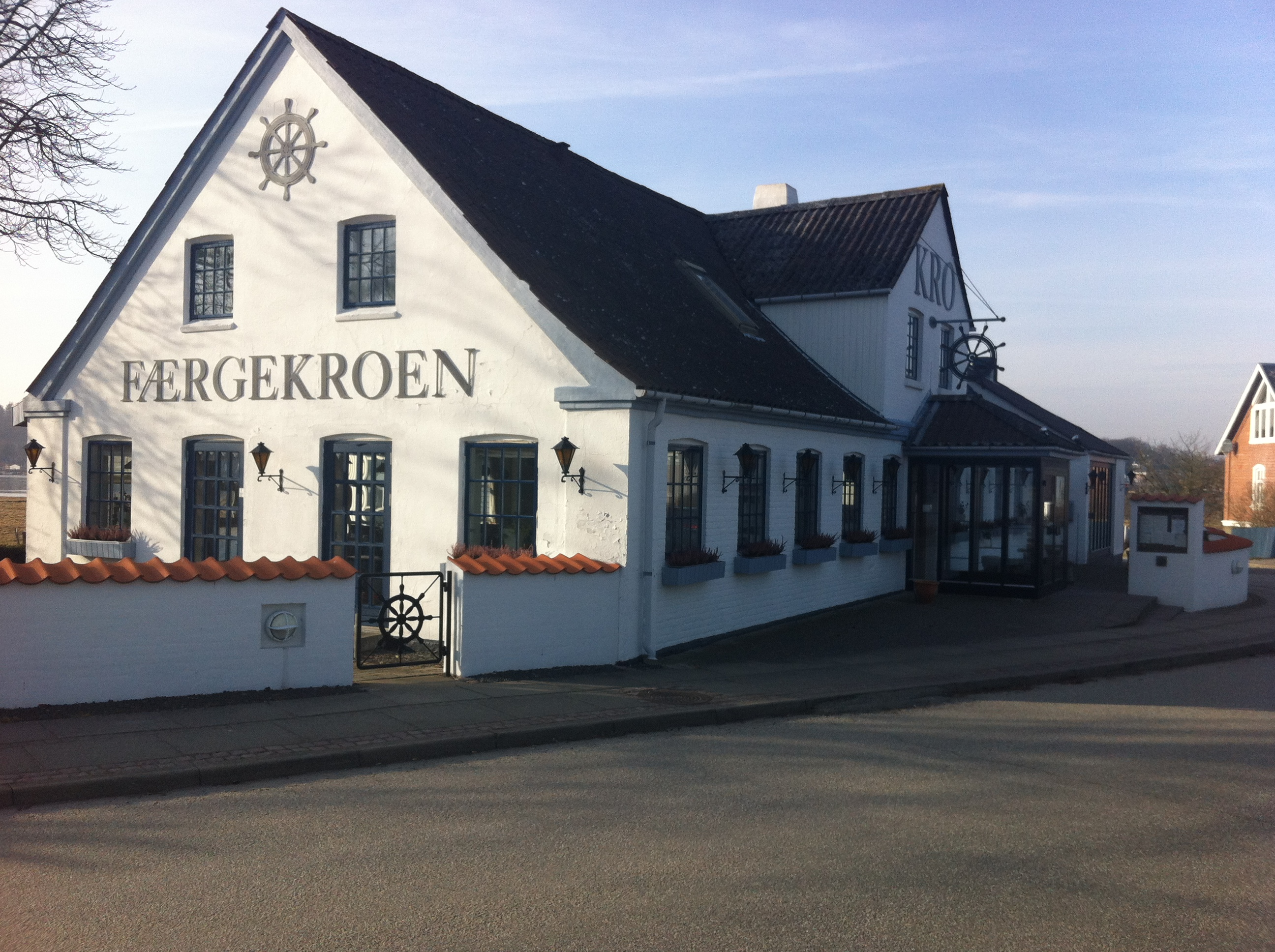

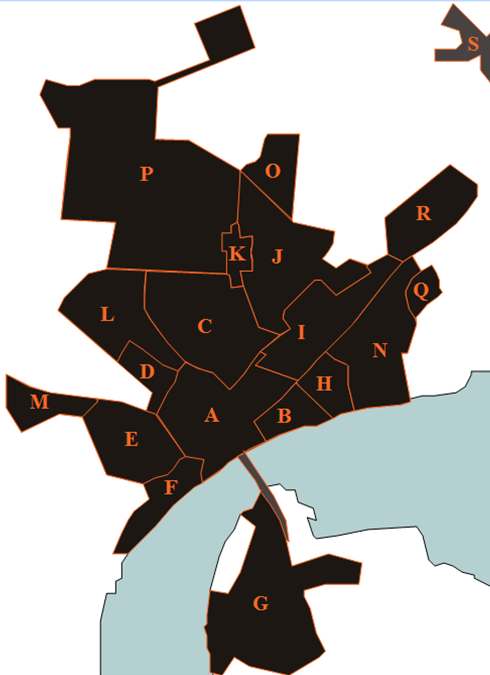
Districts and buildings in and around Hadsund: A: Hadsund Center B: Munchs eng C: Rosendal D: Himmerlandsgade (district) E: Pip-district F: Forest-kvarteret G: Hadsund South H: Ved Stranden I: Island-district J: Holterne K: Søndergårde L: Hadsund Huse M: Højmarken N: Rolighed O: Bøgelunden P: Industrial North Q: Molhøj R: Industrial East

Hadsund South (Danish: Hadsund Syd), originally Sønder Hadsund, is a district in the city of Hadsund, adjoined to the rest of the city by the Hadsund Bridge. It lies 252 meters south of the city proper. Due to the separation from the rest of Hadsund, it is classified as an "independent urban area" by Statistics Denmark. As of 1 January 2026, the area has a population of 434. The area was first recognized in 1436. Today, Hadsund South Station and the Ferry Inn Hotel (Færgekroen) are located in Hadsund South.

== History ==
The first credible mention of Hadsund South in written records appears in 1579 as "Hassond ferresstedtt" after the inn who prepared the ferry site (today Færgekroen). However, other names have also been attributed to the area, such as "Hadsund Husene", dating to at least 1736 and lasting until 1880.

Originally, the ferry inn and local jetty constituted the entire settlement area jetty. However, justification for a tangible population in Hadsund South was only brought by the advent of the railway much later, with boarding access provided by the railway station. This soon spurred industrial development in the area which provided a means of living for the local residents.
