= Hadsund Church =

Coordinates: 56°43′10″N 10°07′04″E

- Hadsund Kirke
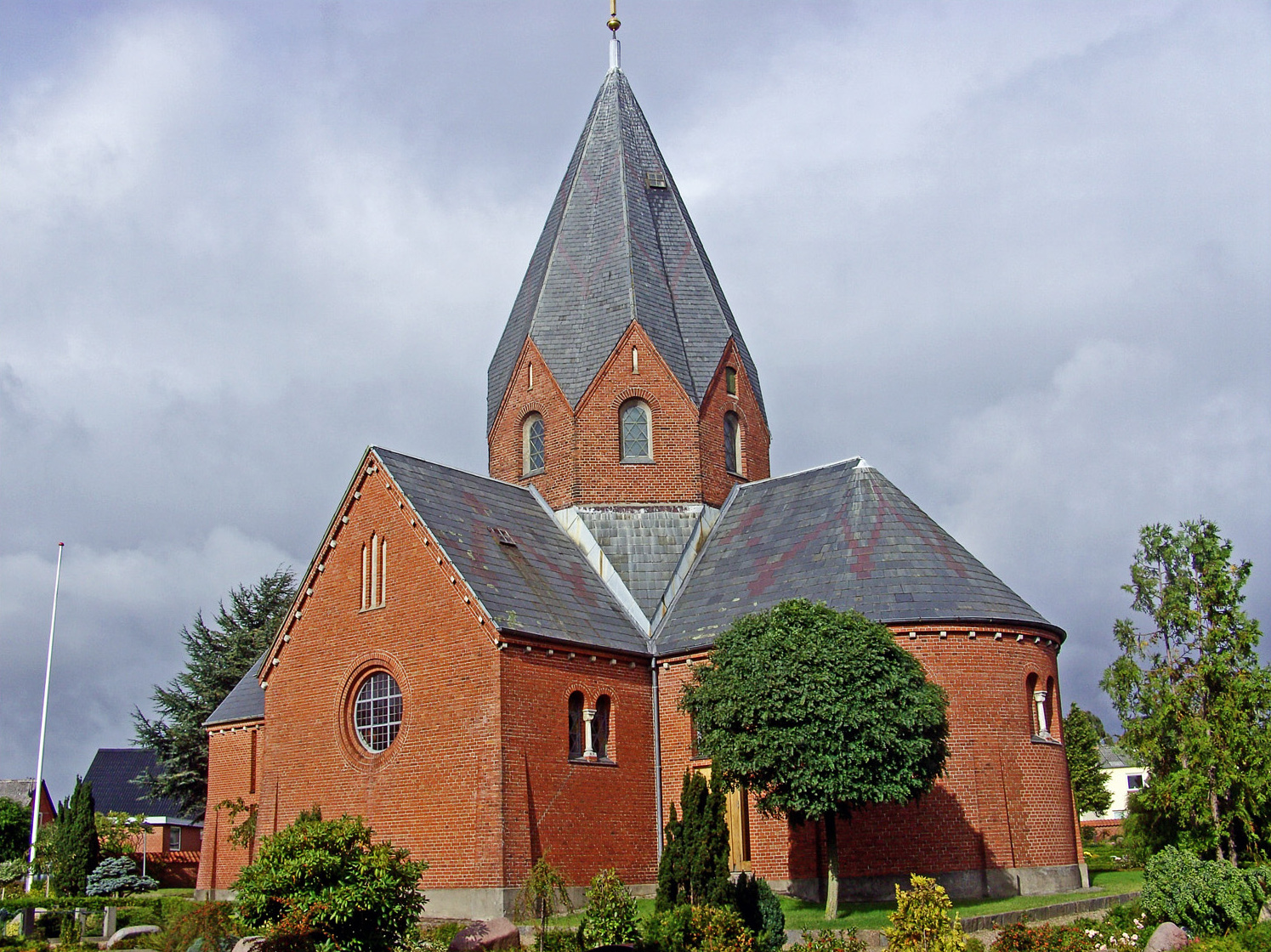
- Hadsund Church
- Location: Hadsund, Mariagerfjord Municipality, Denmark
- Denomination: Church of Denmark

Architecture
- Architect: Claudius August Wiinholt
- Completed: 1898
- Construction cost: 23,000 DKK

Administration
- Diocese: Diocese of Aalborg
- Deanery: Hadsund Provsti
- Parish: Vive-Hadsund Sogn

Hadsund Church (Danish: Hadsund Kirke) is a lutheran church in Hadsund, Denmark. The building was designed by Claudius August Wiinholt and constructed in 1898. Today, the church is within the Diocese of Aalborg in the Church of Denmark.

== Building ==
The church was built in 1898 and designed by the architect Claudius August Wiinholt from Viborg. At the time, the church's construction cost 23,000 krones. An additional 2,000 krones were spent for the construction of a chapel, where the church bell was originally hung. The church's floor plan resembles a greek cross, where each wing is of equal length. In 1967, the church underwent major renovations and the western wing was extended by two meters. The interior of the church was originally constructed with red brick walls, which have since been painted white.

The church was consecrated on August 14, 1898. At the time it was built, the church was outside of the city, but Hadsund has since expanded and today the church is near its center. In 1906, an electrical station was built in Hadsund and the church was subsequently fitted with electricity in 1914.

=== Fixtures ===
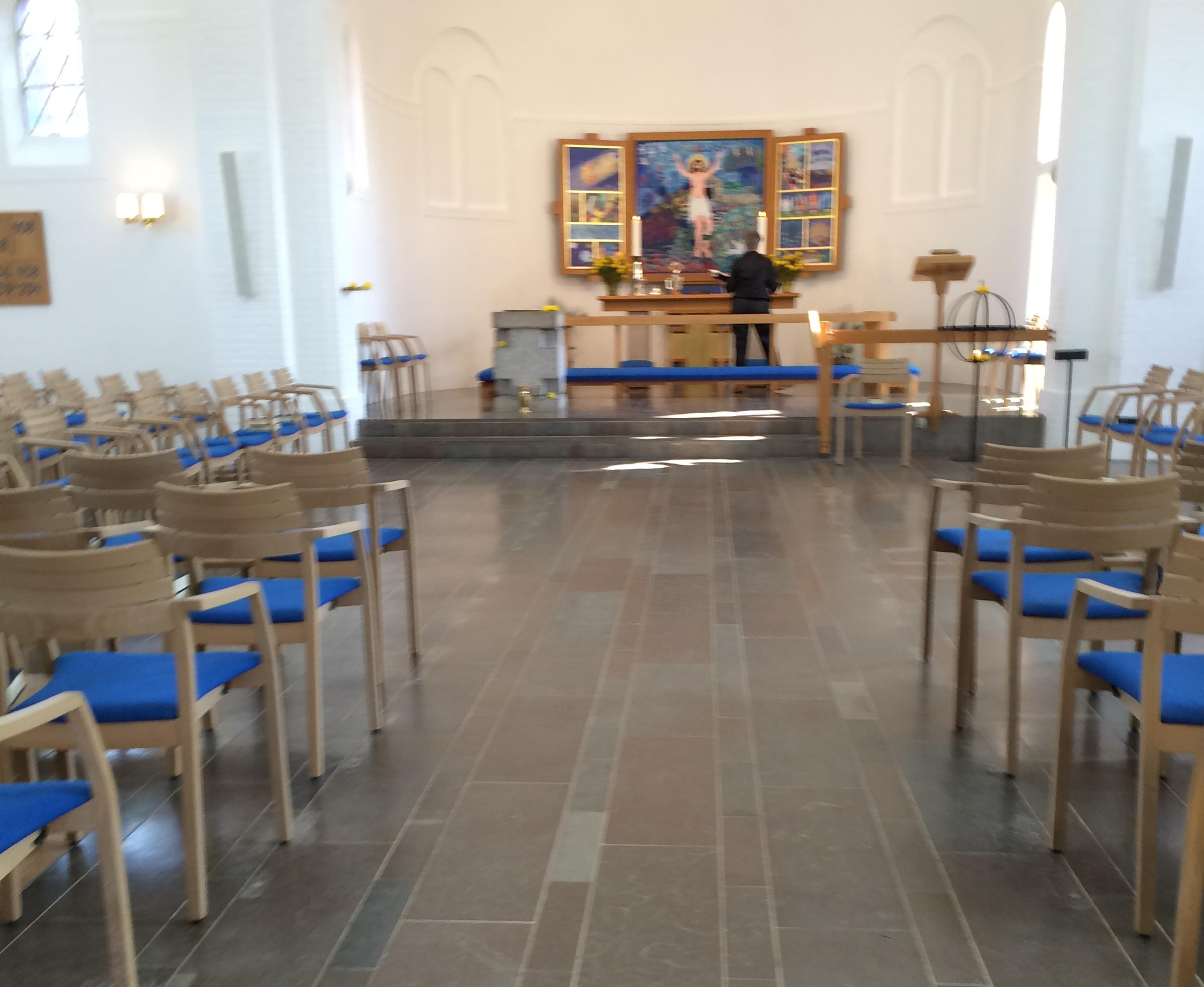
The nave

The brass baptismal font was originally installed at a church within the Diocese of Viborg. That church had closed before Hadsund Church was built, and the baptismal font was moved there before the church opened in 1898. In 2007, it was fitted with a new granite plinth shaped like a greek cross to reflect the architecture of the building.

The altarpiece was donated before the church's dedication by Magdalene Kjellerup, who was then the owner of the Visborggaard Estate. The altarpiece, painted by Olga Marie Smith, was originally a copy of a work by Laurits Tuxen. It was replaced during the renovations in 1967 with a simple crucifix. The current altarpiece was donated to the church on its 100th anniversary in 1998. The artist, Esben Hanefeldt Kristensen, refers to the piece as "The morning death died" (Danish: "Den morgen døden døde"). The painting depicts the resurrection of Jesus and the central panel features Jesus stepping on a snake, symbolizing his defeat of the devil. Additional motifs from both the old and new testament are displayed on the two wings of the altarpiece. The wings can be folded closed to reveal an additional painting of a crown of thorns, which is displayed during Lent, Good Friday, and funeral services.

During the restoration in 1967 a number of fixtures were added to the church, including: the altar and altarpiece, the organ, and the church's former pulpit. The church's organ was constructed by Frobenius & Sønner and has twelve registers, two keyboards, and approximately 800 pipes. The organ has since been fitted with four electronic keyboards. The votive ship was hung, after being restored by a local resident. It had originally been crafted in 1939 in Vejle and was donated to the church in 1943 by Harald Gade, a furniture dealer from Copenhagen. The pulpit was installed along with a sounding board, though it has since been replaced by a podium.

A work of art hangs above the main entrance which was gifted to the church by the goldsmith Bent Exner in 1977. The work consists of 60 copper plates which are arranged in a square.

== Bell tower ==
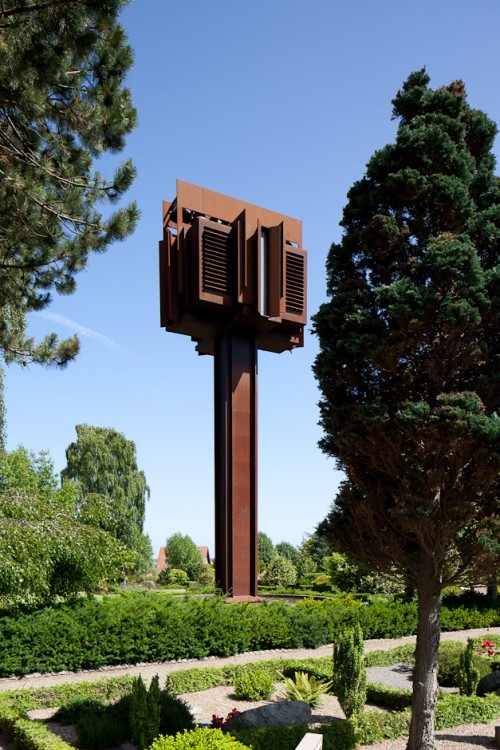
Bell tower, built in 1977

In 1934, the church's first bell was replaced. The new bell, which was cast by a foundry in Brønderslev, was donated by Ane Kirstine Kjeldsen, who lived in Hadsund. The bell was recast in 1966, and now bears the inscription: "See I proclaim to you a great joy" (Danish: "Se jeg forkynder eder en stor glæde").

A new bell tower was designed by the architect J.K. Sørensen, and erected in 1977 out of steel. Following a donation in 1991, the tower was outfitted with a bell chime, which was completed and consecrated in 1992 by the Bishop of the Diocese of Aalborg, Søren Lodberg Hvas. The chime includes 23 new bells in addition to the church's previous three. It is played several times a day by the church's organist.

== Cemetery ==
Jacob Møller, a merchant in Hadsund was the first to purchase a family gravesite in the cemetery. He had been personally invested in the church's creation and had donated the grounds for both the church and its cemetery.

The cemetery quickly outgrew its original plot. Several attempts were made to purchase adjacent land from Jacob Møller and later from his heirs, but the church was unable to raise enough money to meet the price demanded by Møller's estate. By 1919, the situation had become urgent, and the church was in desperate need of more land. Another affluent family in Hadsund, the Hornbechs, bought Møller's land and donated it to the church that year.

The chapel on the church's grounds is largely used for cemetery proceedings. It was built in 1979, after the original chapel had decidedly become too outdated. It was designed by J.K. Sørensen, who is also responsible for the church's bell tower.

=== Notable burials ===
- Jacob Møller
- Jens-Erik Bech
- K. Axel Nielsen
- Martin Bavngaard
- Michael Westergård Jensen
- Tage Jespersen

== Parsonage ==
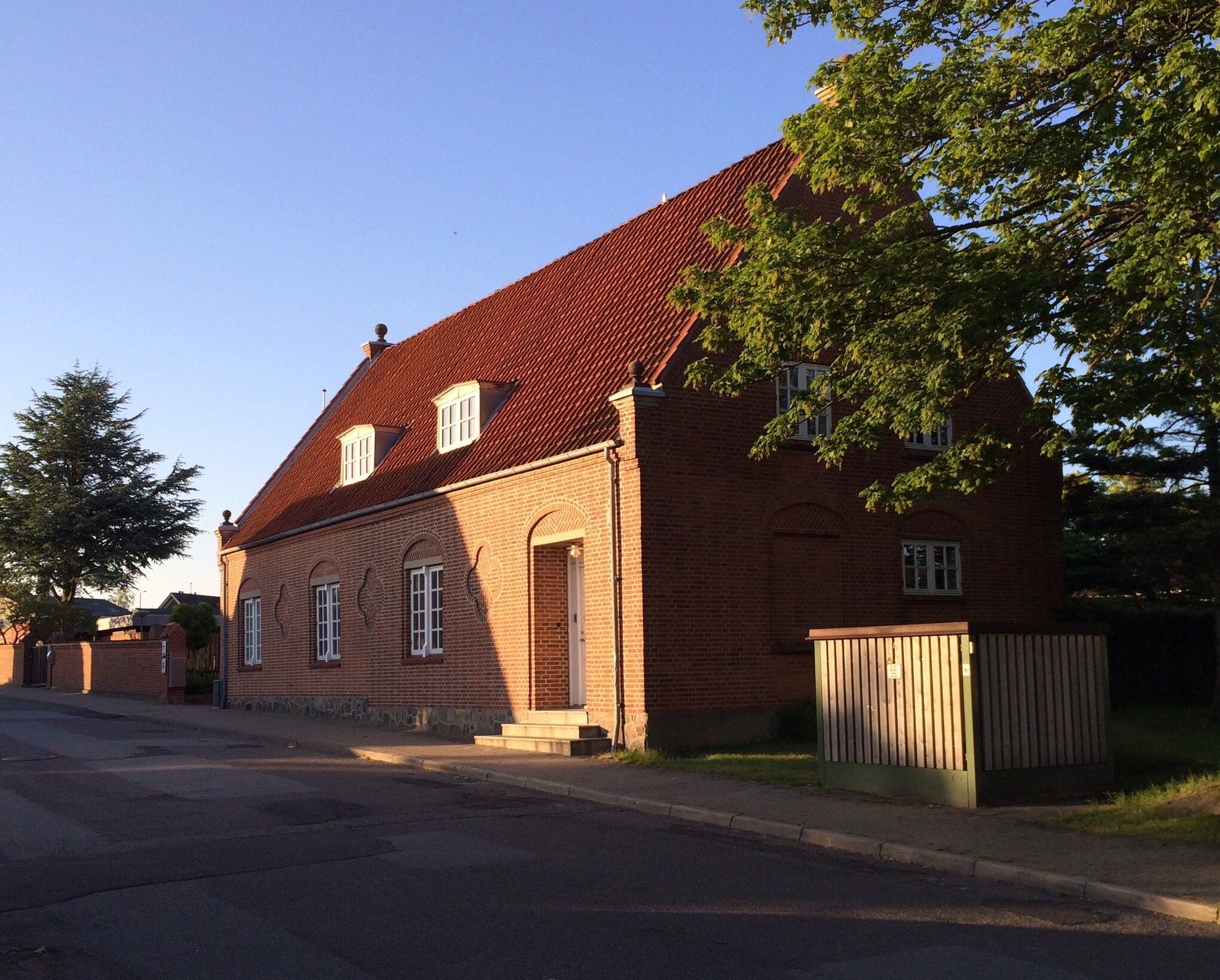
Hadsund parsonage in 2014

The parsonage was first built in 1908, and later expanded in 1927.

In 2014, demolition of the parsonage was proposed due to of extensive mold inside the building. Because of its historical and architectural significance the Municipality of Mariagerfjord lobbied to conserve the building. In April 2015, the municipality gave the church permission to demolish the building, and by August the site had been leveled.

== Pastors ==
- Christian Carl Paludan Koch (1898–1905)
- Hans Georg Baadsgaard (1906–1907)
- Rasmus Boertmann Tikjøb Baden (1907–1911)
- Rasmus Valdemann Jensen (1912–1922)
- Søren Carl Frederik Poulsen Villaume (1922–1927)
- Alfred Thomsen (1927–1963)
- Knud Pedersen (1964–1971)
- Søren Peter Bent Mathiasen (1971–2000)
- Otto Bertelsen (1978–1983)
- Elbæk Nejsum (1983–1989)
- Carsten Bøgh Pedersen (1989–)
- Mette Nøhr Shaw (1999–2001)
- Erik Bang (2000–2016)
- Mariane Madsen (2001–2001)
- Winnie Huus (2007–)
- Nadia Uhrup Hassig (2017–)

== Gallery ==
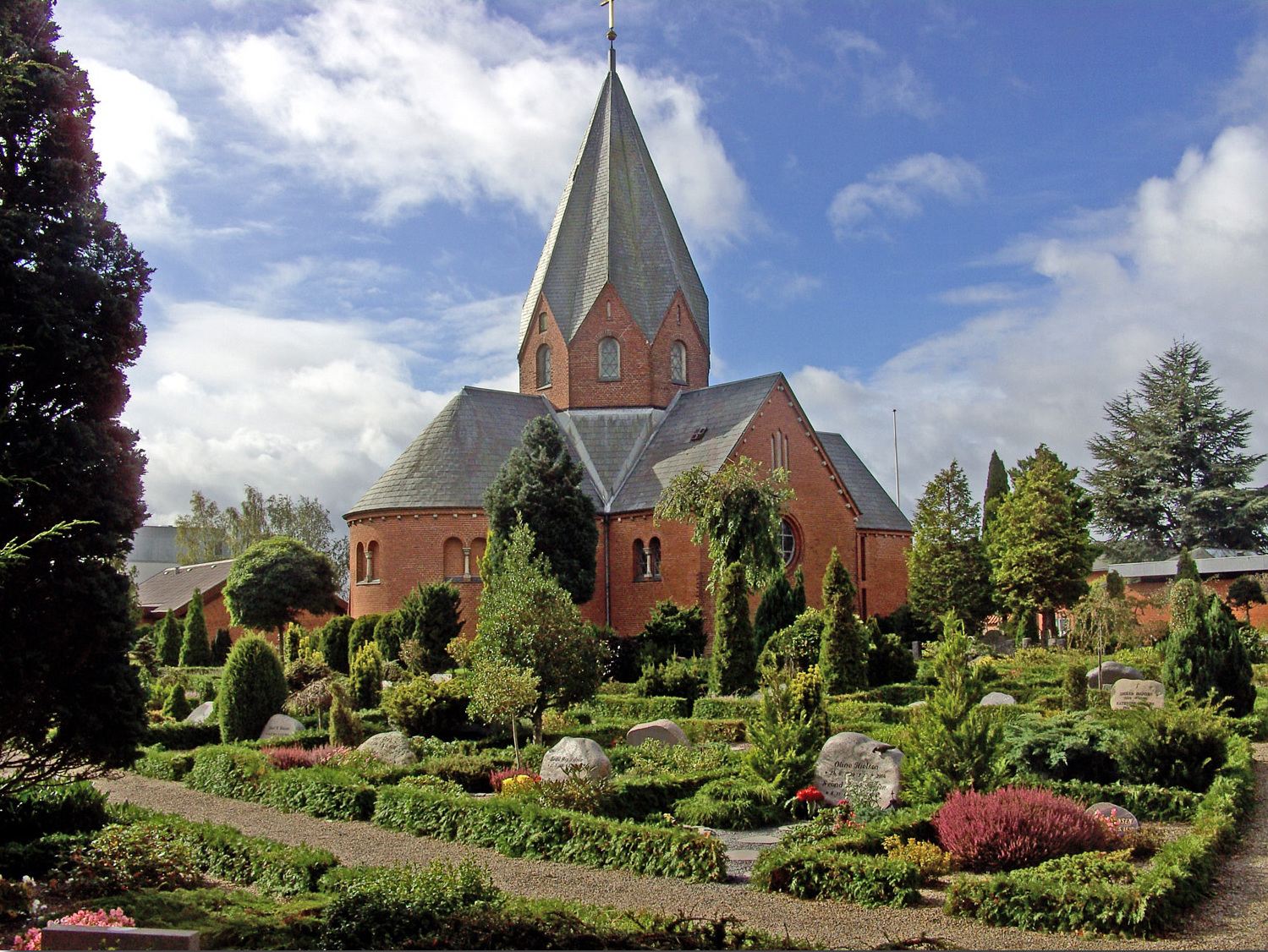
Cemetery outside the church

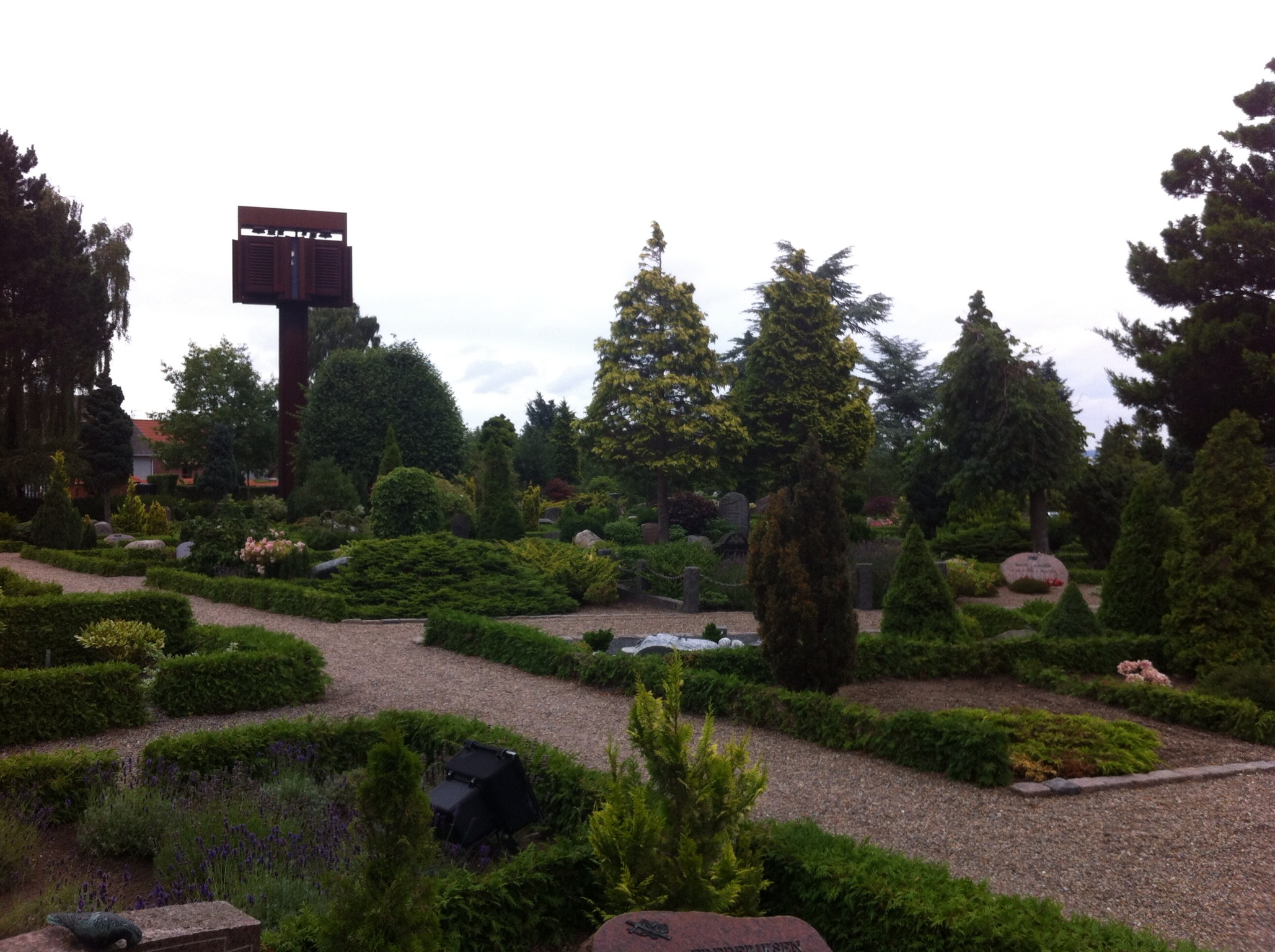
Hadsund Cemetery with the church's bell tower in the background

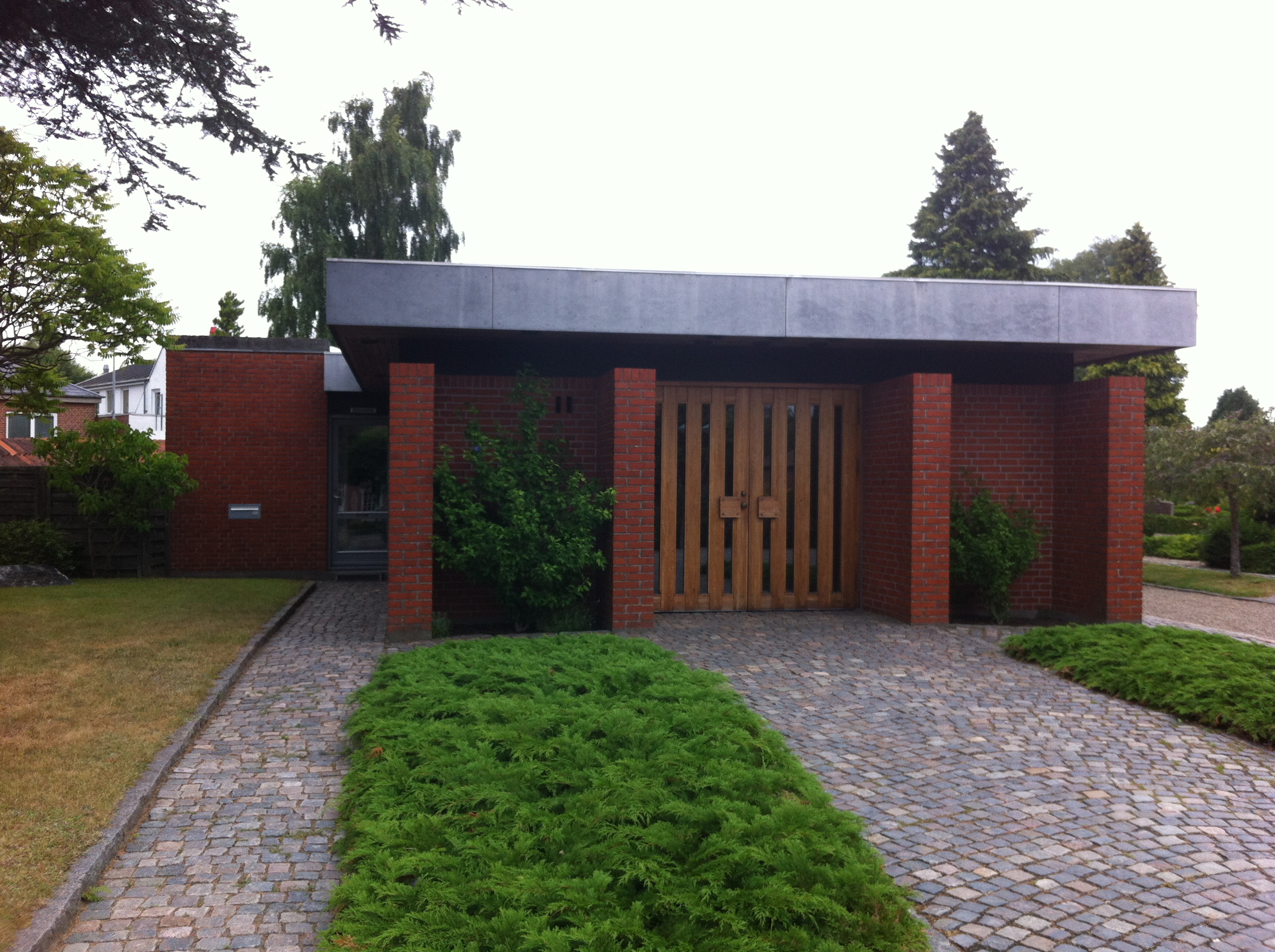
The chapel built in 1979

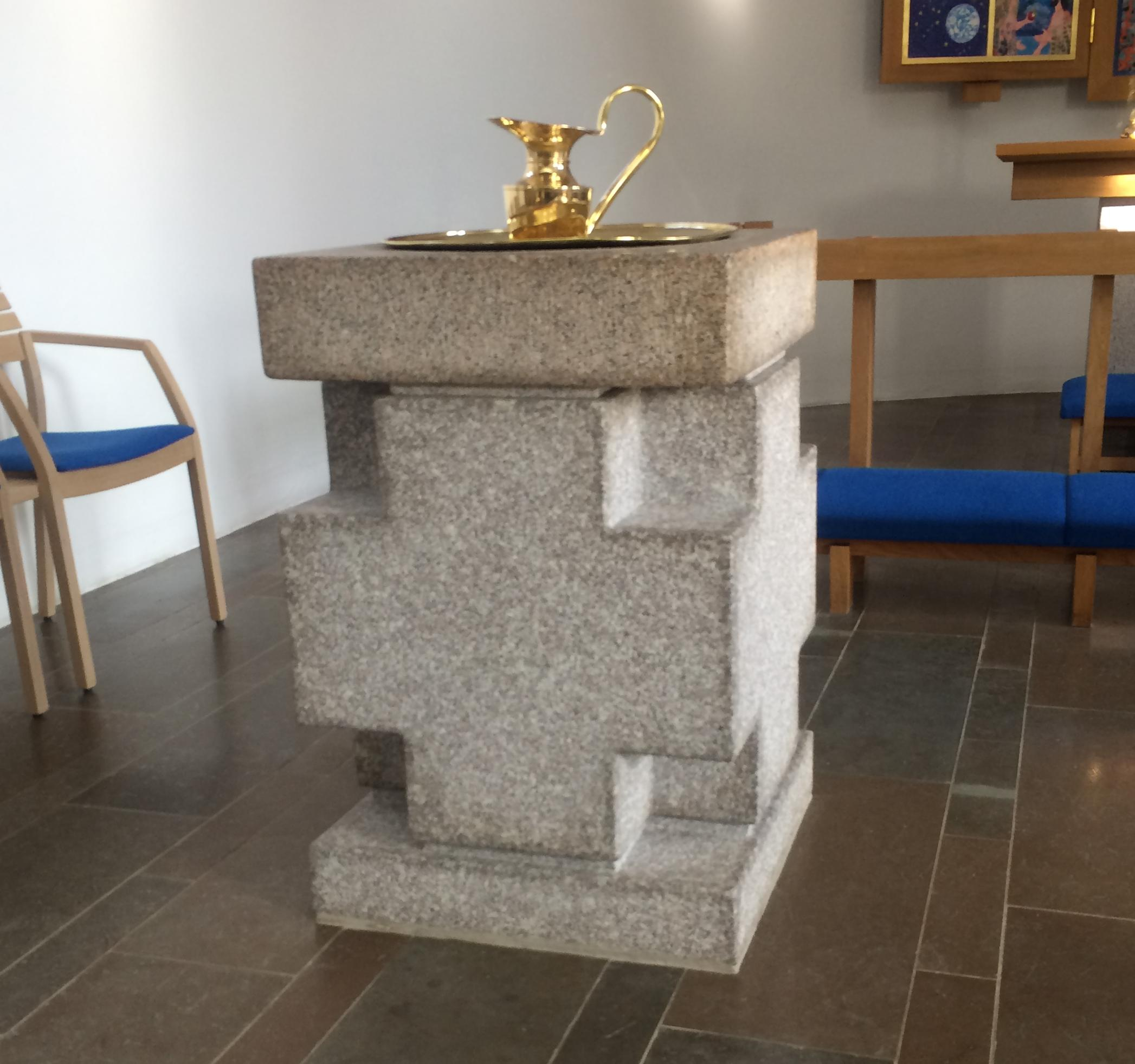
Baptismal font
