= Hadsund South Station =

Railway station in Denmark

Coordinates: 56.7086°N 10.1190°E

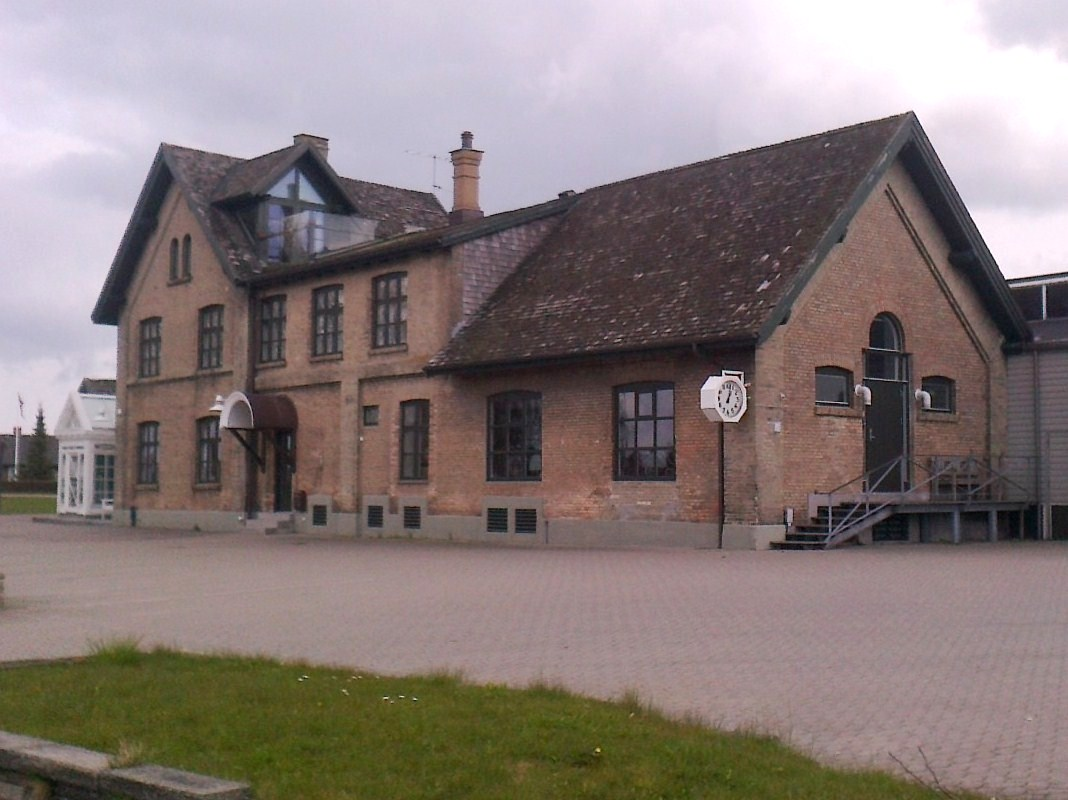
Hadsund South Station

Hadsund South Station (Danish: Hadsund Syd Station) was a railway station in Hadsund, Denmark, until 1 April 1969, when the Aalborg–Hadsund Railway and Randers–Hadsund Railway were closed. As of 2014, the station buildings still exist and are in private hands. The buildings are located on the south side of Mariager Fjord.

The station opened in 1883 as the terminus of the Randers–Hadsund Railway. After the Hadsund Bridge across the Mariager Fjord was opened in 1904, some Aalborg–Hadsund trains continued to the station from their former terminus at Hadsund North Station. The bridge was renovated in 1927, and thereafter both the Randers–Hadsund and Aalborg–Hadsund lines terminated at Hadsund North, with Hadsund South being reduced to an unstaffed halt.
