= Arden Municipality =

Former municipality in Nordjylland, Denmark

Coordinates: 56°46′11″N 9°51′32″E

Arden municipality was a municipality (Danish, kommune) in North Jutland County on the Jutland peninsula in northern Denmark until 1 January 2007. The municipality covered an area of 228 km^{2}, and had a total population of 8,513 (2005). Its last mayor was Hans Christian Maarup, a member of the Social Democrats (Socialdemokraterne) political party.

The main town and the site of its municipal council was the town of Arden.

The municipality was created in 1970 due to a kommunalreform ("Municipality Reform") that combined Astrup, Store Arden, Oue-Valsgaard, Rold-Vebbestrup and Rostrup municipalities.

On 1 January 2007 Arden municipality ceased to exist as the result of Kommunalreformen ("The Municipality Reform" of 2007). It was merged with former Hadsund and Hobro municipalities, and part of Mariager Municipality to form the new Mariagerfjord Municipality. This created a municipality with an area of 769 km^{2} and a total population of 43,049 (2005). The new municipality belongs to the Region Nordjylland ("North Jutland Region").

== Attractions ==
Rold Skov (Rold Forest) is the best known attraction in Arden municipality.

== Notable people ==
- Thora Daugaard (1874–1951), women's rights activist and pacifist
- Jacob Barrett Laursen (born 1994 in Arden) a Danish footballer who plays as a left-back for Arminia Bielefeld
