= Dorte Dalum Jensen =

Danish footballer (born 1978)

Personal information
- Date of birth: 3 July 1978 (age 48)
- Place of birth: Hadsund, Denmark
- Height: 1.72 m (5 ft 7 1/2 in)
- Position: Left-back

Youth career
- Hadsund Boldklub
- Vorup FB

Senior career*
Years	Team	Apps	(Gls)
1997–2002	HEI		
2002–2003	IF Liungen		
2004–2005	Asker SK		
2006–2007	Djurgården/Älvsjö		
2008–2009	Olympique Lyonnais	28	(0)
2009–2012	LSK Kvinner	15	(2)

International career
1999–2007	Denmark	41	(1)
- * Club domestic league appearances and goals

Dorte Dalum Jensen (born 3 July 1978) is a Danish former football defender. She played for Norwegian Toppserien club LSK Kvinner. She won over 40 caps for the Denmark national team.

== Club career ==
In January 2008, Dalum Jensen left Swedish Damallsvenskan contenders Djurgården/Älvsjö to sign for Olympique Lyonnais. In summer 2009, she returned to Norwegian football, where she had previously played for IF Liungen and Asker SK. This time her destination was Team Strømmen, who became LSK Kvinner for the 2010 season. Dalum Jensen suffered a damaged cruciate ligament in January 2011.

Although Jensen's parents and two elder brothers had no interest in football, she began to play at school, aged 10. Her early career took in local club Hadsund Boldklub, Vorup FB, and then Hjortshøj Egå Idrætsforening (HEI) before she left for Norway.

== National career ==
She represented Denmark at the UEFA European Championship 2005 and was named in the squad for the 2007 FIFA World Cup in China.

Dalum Jensen won 14 caps and scored two goals for the Denmark under-21 team, making her senior debut against Netherlands in September 1999. She scored a single goal for the national team, in a 3–2 friendly defeat by France in September 2004. She won the last of 41 caps in August 2007, in a World Cup warm-up friendly defeat by Sweden in Farum.

== Personal life ==
Dalum Jensen's partner is the Norwegian goalkeeper Bente Nordby, whom she played alongside at Asker, Djurgårdens, and Lyon.
