= Michael Westergård Jensen =

- Born: 25 October 1916; Nordregrave 9, Randers
- Died: 23 June 1944 (aged 27); Ryvangen
- Cause of death: Execution by firing squad
- Resting place: Hadsund
- Occupation: Merchant
- Known for: Executed as member of the Danish resistance movement

Michael Westergård Jensen (25 October 1916 – 23 June 1944) was a merchant and member of the Danish resistance executed by the German occupying power.

== Biography ==
In March 1944 the Gestapo made an "incredible number of arrests" including ten arrests in the region of Års, among these Jensen. On 23 June 1944 Jensen and seven other members of the resistance were executed in Ryvangen.

== After his death ==
The January 1945 issue of the resistance newspaper Frit Danmark (Free Denmark) reported on the execution of the eight resistance members including Jensen. On 29 June 1945 Jensen was buried at Hadsund Church.

A memorial stone for Jensen and 90 other resistance members also exhumed in Ryvangen and buried in their respective home towns was laid down in Ryvangen Memorial Park.
