= Hobro =

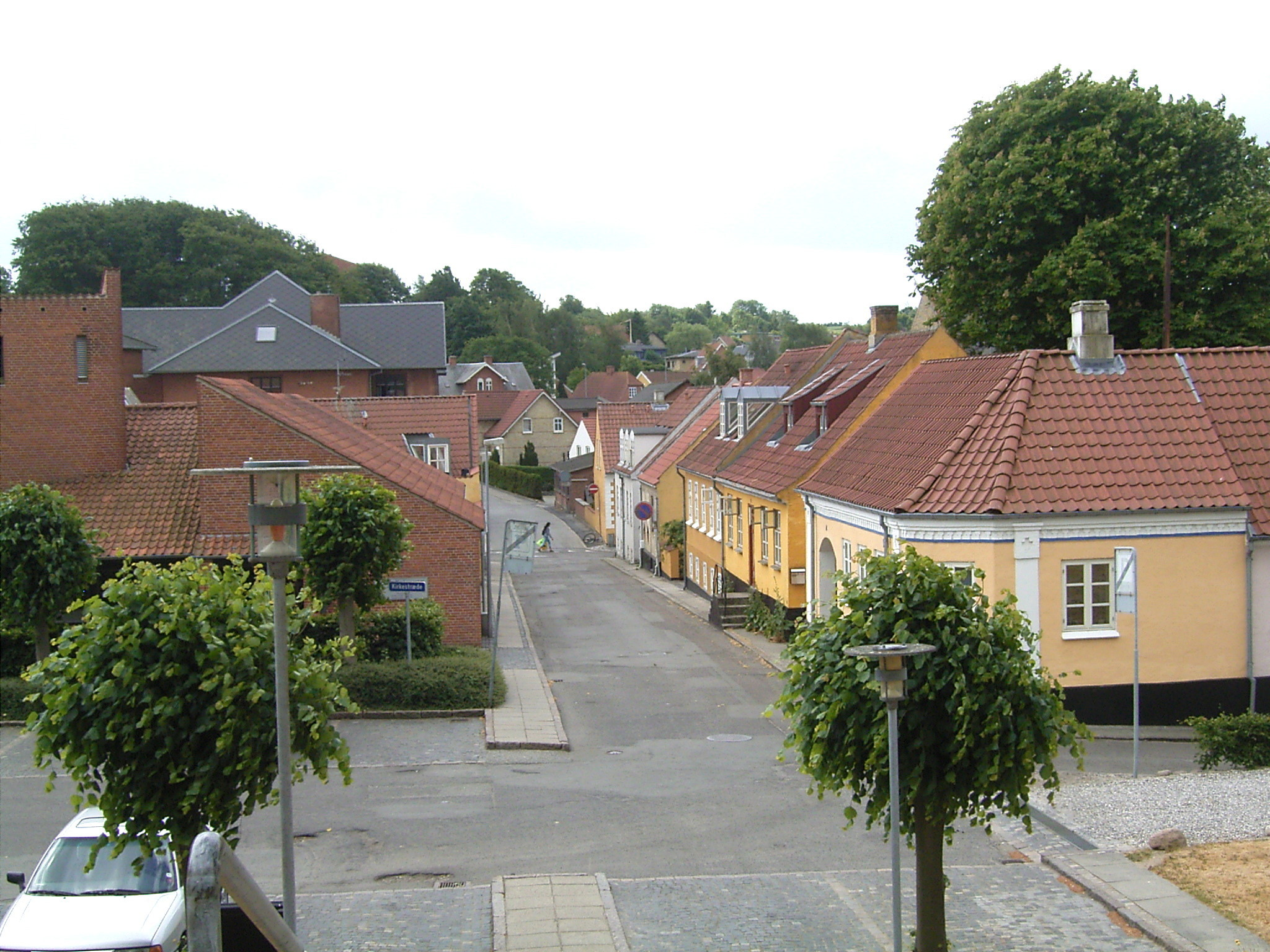
- A view from the town church

- Coat of arms

- Location in Denmark Hobro (North Jutland Region)
- Coordinates: 56°38′N 09°48′E
- Country: Denmark
- Region: North Denmark (Nordjylland)
- Municipality: Mariagerfjord

Area
  - Urban: 9.8 km^{2} (3.8 sq mi)

Population (2026)
  - Urban: 12,440
  - Urban density: 1,300/km^{2} (3,300/sq mi)
  - Gender: 6,238 males and 6,202 females
- Demonym: Hobroer Hobrogenser
- Time zone: UTC+1 (Central Europe Time)
  - Summer (DST): UTC+2

Hobro (Danish pronunciation: [hoˈpʁoˀ]) is an old market and railway town in Region Nordjylland on the Jutland peninsula in northern Denmark. It has a population of 12,440 (1 January 2026). The town is situated in a hilly terrain at the head of Mariager Fjord, close to the former Viking fortress of Fyrkat. It is the seat of Mariagerfjord municipality.

== Politics ==
Hobro was until 1 January 2007 also a municipality (Danish, kommune) in North Jutland County covering an area of 166 km^{2} and with a total population of 15,318 (2005). Its last mayor was Jørgen Pontoppidan, a member of the Venstre (Liberal Party) political party.

Hobro municipality ceased to exist due to Kommunalreformen ("The Municipality Reform" of 2007). It was merged with Arden, Hadsund, and Mariager municipalities to form the new Mariagerfjord municipality. This created a municipality with an area of 769 km^{2} and a total population of 43,049 (2005). The new municipality belongs to Region Nordjylland ("North Jutland Region").

== Sport ==
Hobro IK is a football club based in Hobro who currently play in the Danish First Division.

== Transportation ==
=== Rail ===
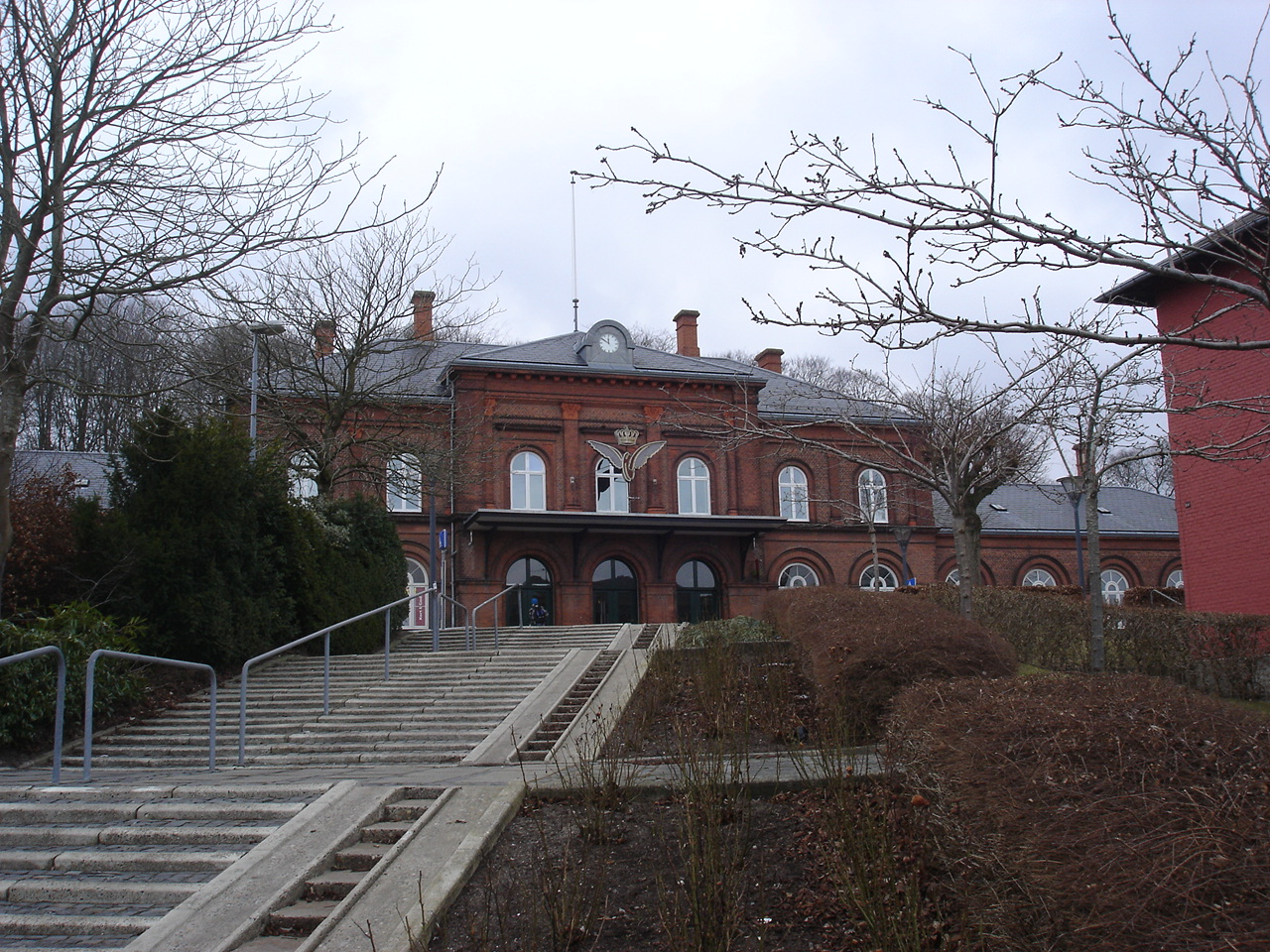
Front facade of Hobro railway station.

Hobro is served by Hobro railway station. It is located on the Randers–Aalborg railway line and offers direct InterCity services to Copenhagen and Aalborg and regional train services to Aalborg. The station was opened on 15 June 1893. The station's present passenger building was built simultaneously with the construction of the harbour line in 1899–1901. The harbour line was removed in 1966.

== Notable people ==
- Thora Daugaard (1874 in Store Arden near Hobro – 1951) a women's rights activist, pacifist, editor and translator
- Ingeborg Brams (1921 in Hobro – 1989) a Danish film, radio, TV and theatre actress
- Bent Norup (1936 in Hobro – 2007), operatic heldenbaritone
- Matias Faldbakken (born 1973 in Hobro) a Norwegian artist and writer
- Mads Nissen (born 1979 in Hobro) a documentary photographer, won 2015 World Press Photo of the Year

=== Sport ===
- Gert Frank (born 1956 in Hobro) a former cyclist, team bronze medallist at the 1976 Summer Olympics
- Tom Kristensen (born 1967 in Hobro) a racing driver
- Michael V. Knudsen (born 1978 in Hobro) a handball player
- Martin Thomsen (born 1982 in Hobro) a Danish footballer, over 350 caps, mainly for Skive IK
- Fie Udby Erichsen (born 1985 in Hobro) a rower and silver medalist in the women's single sculls at the 2012 Summer Olympics
- Michael Færk Christensen (born 1986 in Hobro), a racing cyclist
- Caroline Møller (born 1998 in Hobro), footballer for Denmark
- Frederik Bjerre (born 2000), Danish handball player for the Danish national team
