= Mariager Municipality =

Former municipality of Denmark

Coordinates: 56°39′N 10°00′E

Until 1 January 2007 Mariager municipality was a municipality (Danish, kommune) in Aarhus County on the east coast of the Jutland peninsula in central Denmark. The municipality covered an area of 201 km^{2}, and had a total population of 8,300 (2005). Its last mayor was Erik Kirkegaard Mikkelsen, a member of the Conservative People's Party (Det Konservative Folkeparti) political party. The main town and the site of its municipal council was the town of Mariager.

Mariager municipality ceased to exist as the result of Kommunalreformen ("The Municipality Reform" of 2007). Part of it was merged with existing Arden, Hadsund, and Hobro municipalities to form the new Mariagerfjord municipality. This created a municipality with an area of 769 km^{2} and a total population of 43,049 (2005) belonging to Region Nordjylland ("North Jutland Region"). The remainder was merged into an enlarged Randers municipality.
