= Hadsund North Station =

Railway station in Denmark

Coordinates: 56.7174°N 10.1188°E

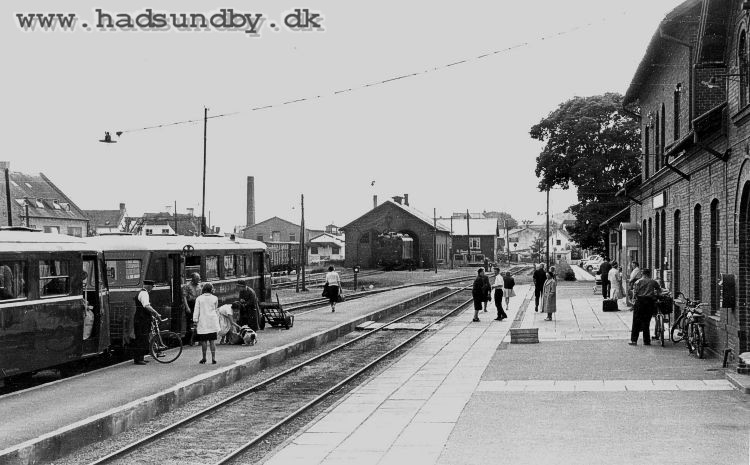
- Hadsund North Station in 1969. The building on the left is Østre Alle 18. The building on the right is the station building on Jernbanegade 2.

General information
- Location: North Jutland Region; Denmark
Location

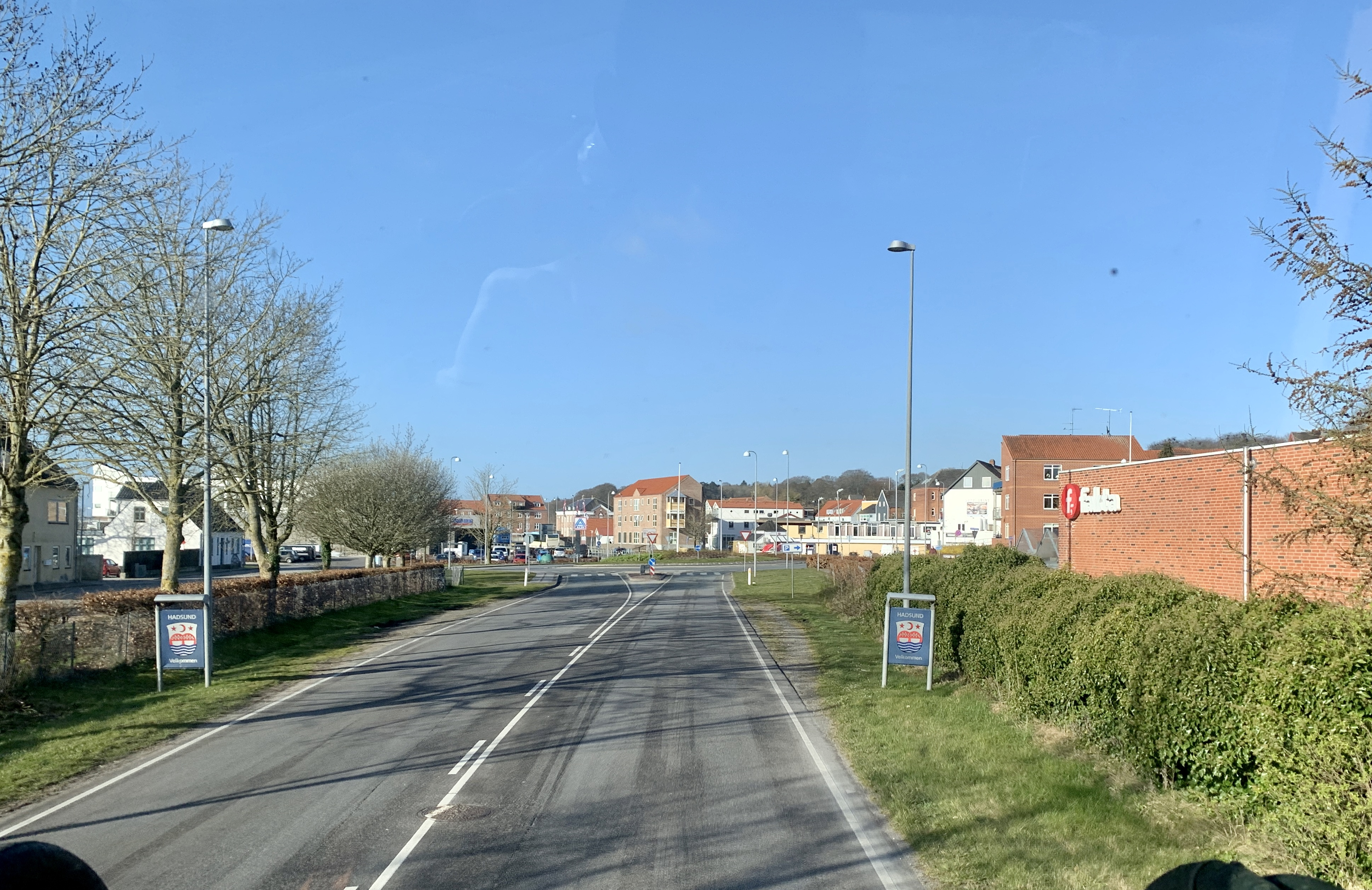
Hadsund North Station area as it looks today. The yellow building on the left is Østre Alle 18. The building on the right is Fakta, the replaced 1986 station building on Jernbanegade 2.

Hadsund North Station (Danish: Hadsund Nord Station) was a railway station in Hadsund, Denmark. Opened in 1900 and located near Hadsund Harbour, it served the city until 1 April 1969, when the Aalborg–Hadsund Railway and the Randers–Hadsund Railway closed. The station was demolished in 1985 to make way for a new bus station.

== See also ==
- Hadsund South Station
