= Astrup, Ringkøbing-Skjern =

Astrup
- Village
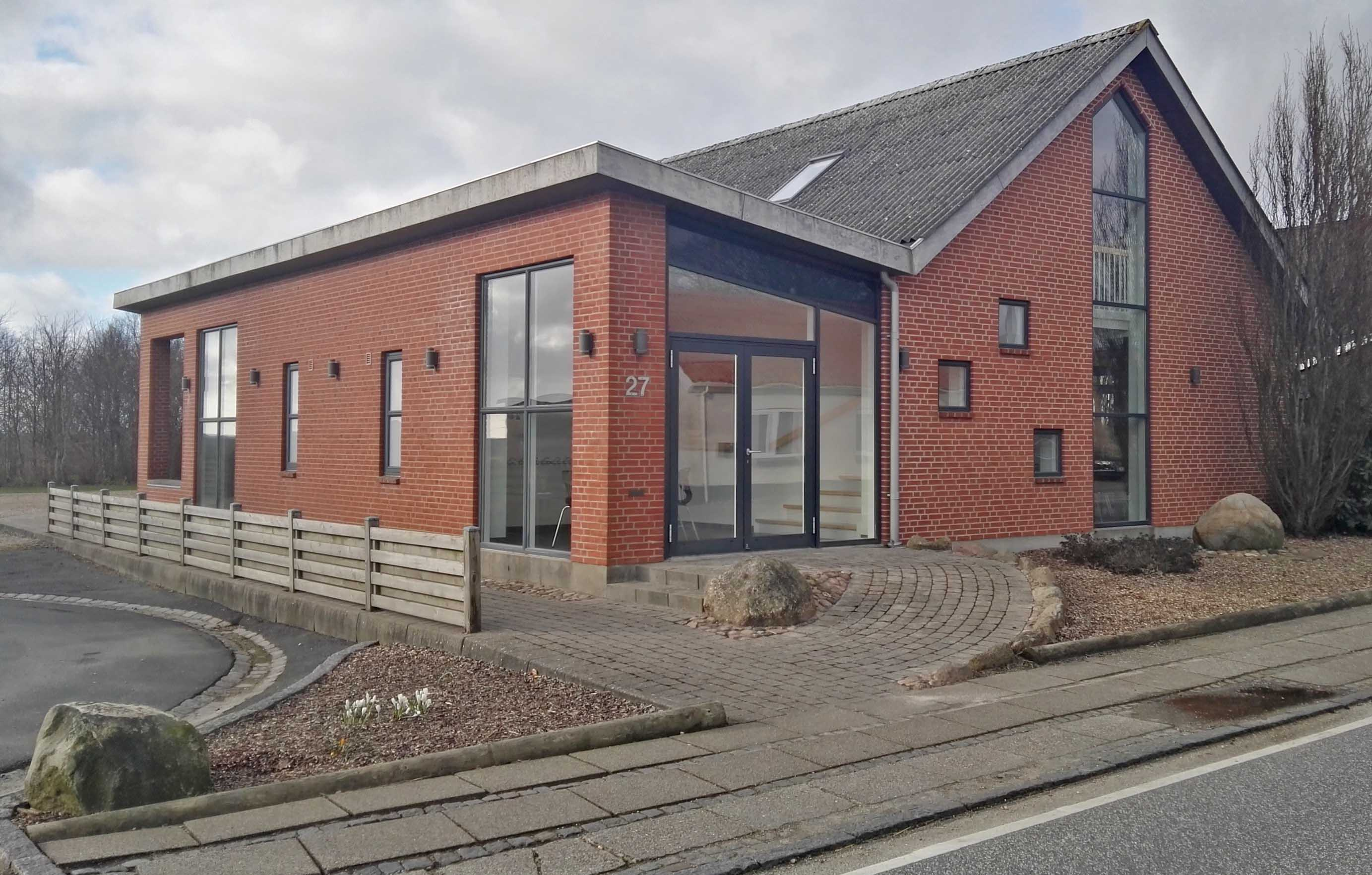
- The village hall in Astrup

- Location in Central Denmark Region Astrup (Denmark)
- Coordinates: 56°0′36″N 8°36′12″E
- Country: Denmark
- Region: Central Denmark (Midtjylland)
- Municipality: Ringkøbing-Skjern

Population (2026)
  - Total: 288
- Time zone: UTC+1 (Central European Time)
  - Summer (DST): UTC+2 (Central European Summer Time)

Astrup is a village in Ringkøbing-Skjern Municipality, Central Denmark Region in Denmark. It is located 10 km south of Videbæk, 16 km east of Lem, 28 km southeast of Ringkøbing and 11 km northeast of Skjern.
