= Astrup, Mariagerfjord Municipality =

Astrup
- Village
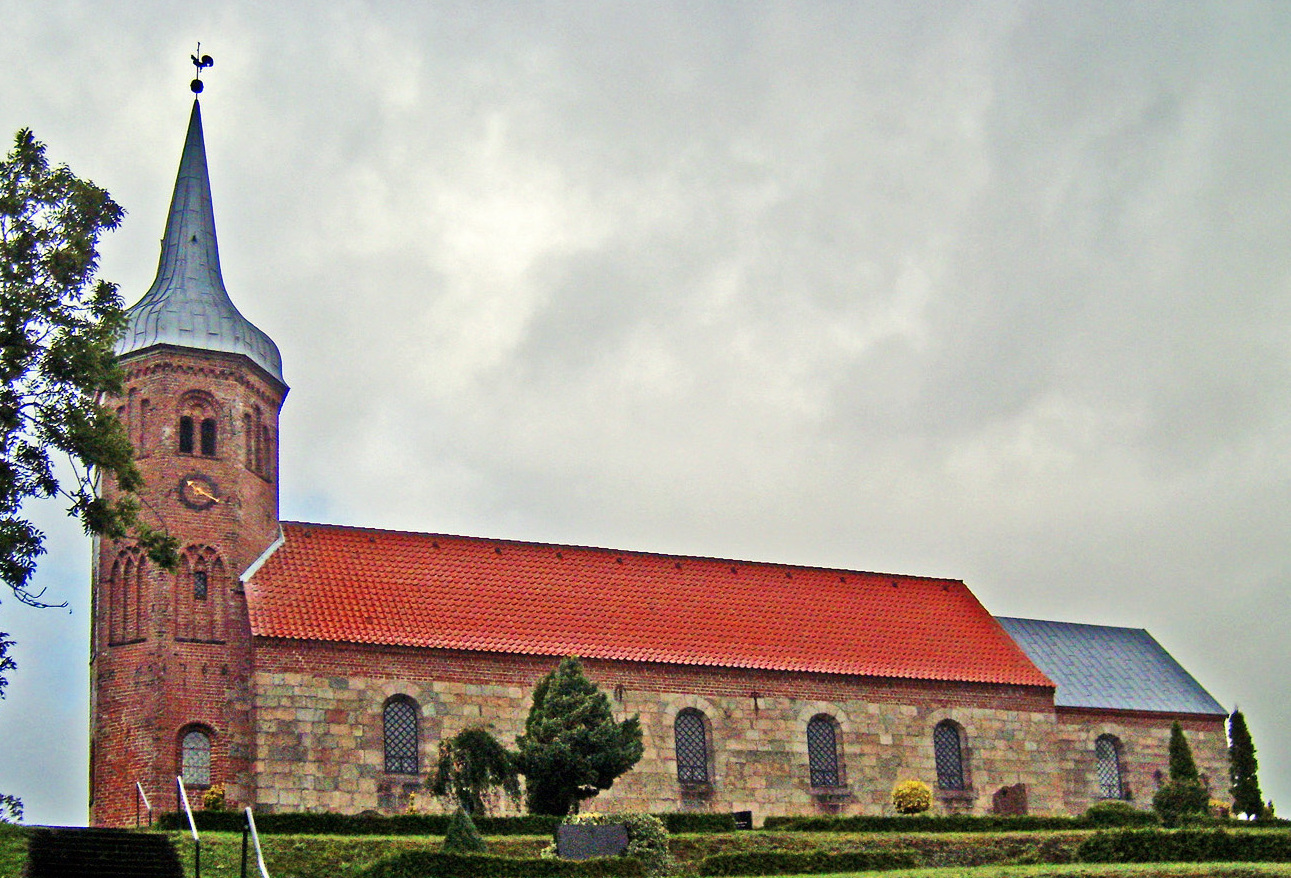
- Astrup church

- Location within Denmark
- Coordinates: 56°46′1″N 9°58′5″E
- Country: Denmark
- Region: North Denmark (Nordjylland)
- Municipality: Mariagerfjord

Population (2026)
  - Total: 489
- Time zone: UTC+1 (Central European Time)
  - Summer (DST): UTC+2 (Central European Summer Time)

Astrup is a village in Mariagerfjord Municipality, Denmark.

== Notable people ==
- Jørn Lund (born 1944 in Astrup) a former Danish cyclist, team bronze medallist in the 1976 Summer Olympics
