= Mariager Fjord =

Longest fjord in Denmark

Coordinates: 56°41′N 10°02′E

Designations

Ramsar Wetland
- Official name: Randers and Mariager Fjords and The Adjacent Sea
- Designated: 2 September 1977
- Reference no.: 150

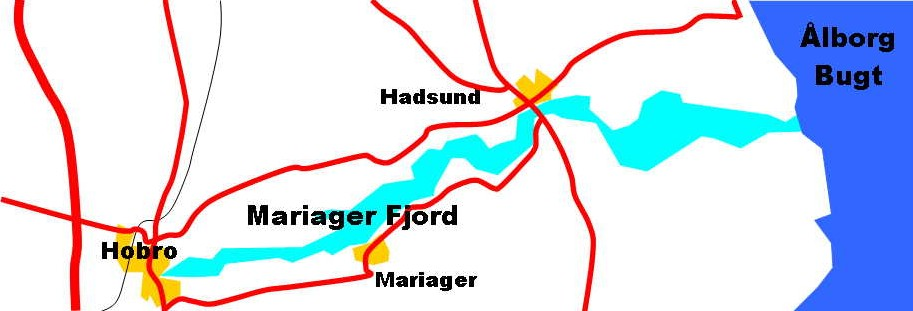
Map of Mariager Fjord with major towns and roads

With a length of approximately 35 km (22 statute miles), Mariager Fjord is the longest fjord in Jutland, and the 2nd longest fjord (tied with Ise Fjord on Zealand), behind Roskilde Fjord in Denmark (excluding the self-governing territory of Greenland). Mariager Fjord cuts into the Jutland peninsula from the Kattegat sea and ends at the town of Hobro; other important towns along the fjord are Hadsund and Mariager from which the fjord takes its name. Mariager fjord makes up most of the southern limit of the traditional region of Himmerland.

In Danish language, any type of inlet in Denmark is called a fjord, even lagoons. Geologically, Mariager Fjord isn't a true fjord, but an inlet of the förde type.

The width of Mariager Fjord varies from 4½ km to 250 metres (2,8-0,16 miles) and its area is about 47 km^{2}s (18 square miles). The depth is up to 30 metres (ca. 100 ft).

As a result of the 2007 Municipal Reform, the new Mariagerfjord municipality was created around Mariager Fjord by fusion of four former municipalities.

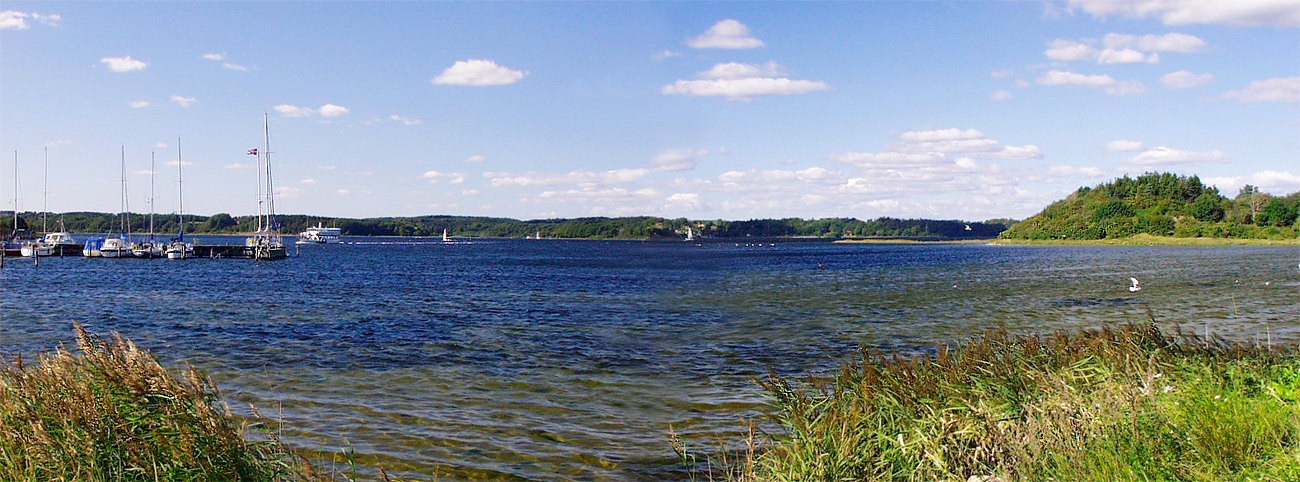

== See also ==
- Randers Fjord – Danish fjord
- Limfjord – Shallow part of the sea, located in Denmark
