= Mariagerfjord Municipality =

Mariagerfjord Municipality Mariagerfjord Kommune (Danish)
- Municipality
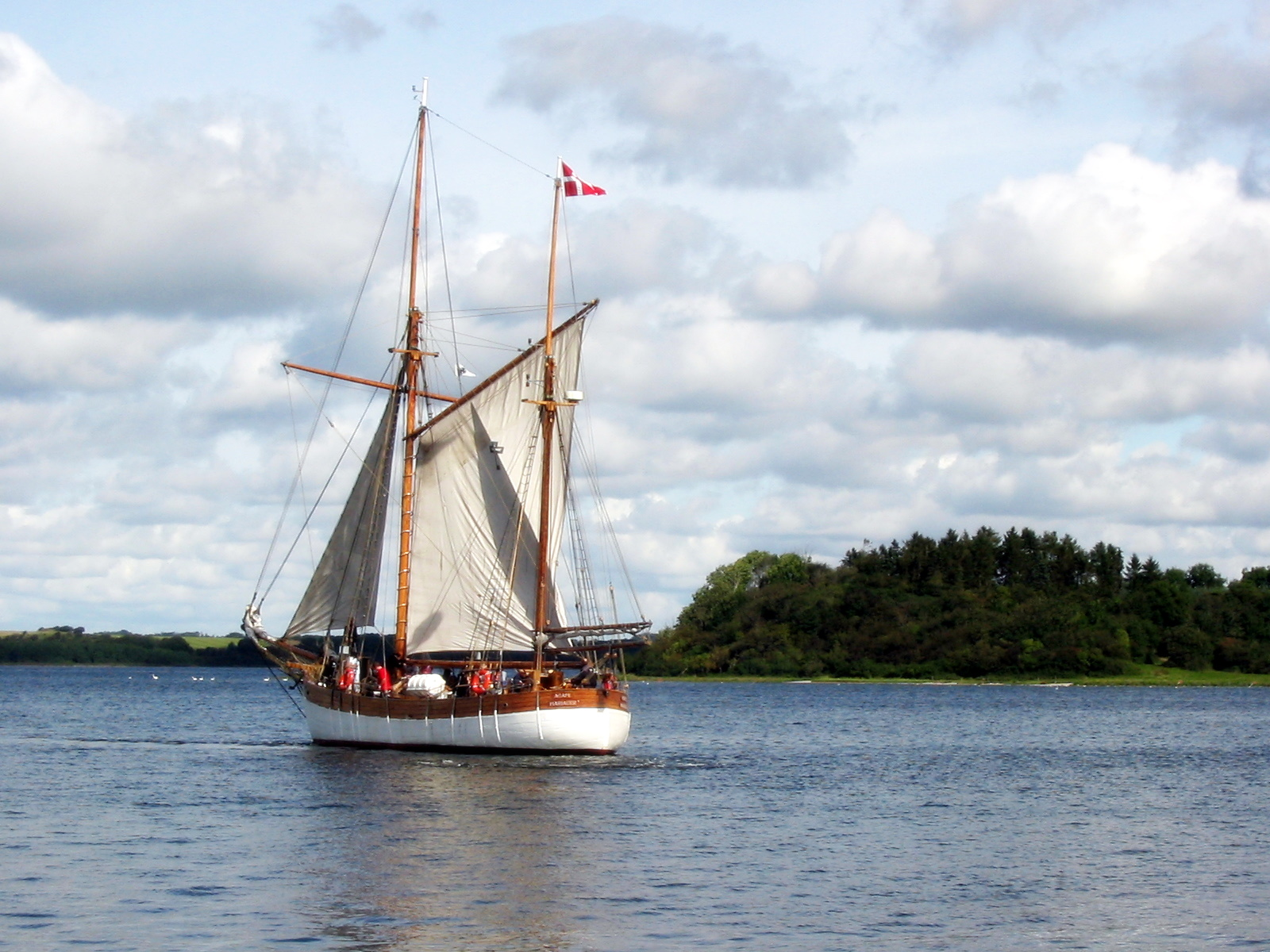
- A sailboat in Mariager Fjord

- Coat of arms

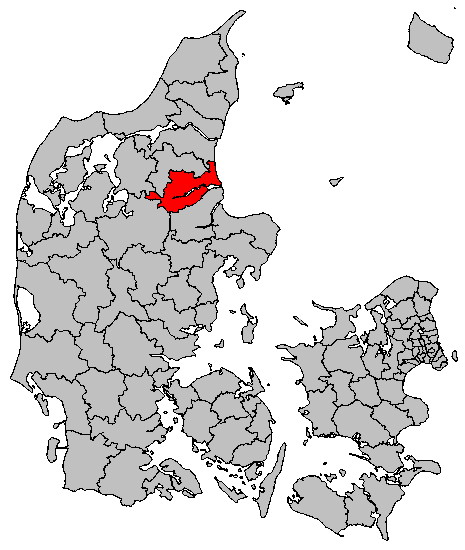
- Location in Denmark
- Coordinates: 56°41′N 9°56′E
- Country: Denmark
- Region: North Jutland
- Established: 1 January 2007

Government
  - Mayor: Jesper Skov Mikkelsen

Area
  - Total: 769 km^{2} (297 sq mi)

Population (1 January 2026)
  - Total: 41,541
  - Density: 54.0/km^{2} (140/sq mi)
- Time zone: UTC+1 (CET)
  - Summer (DST): UTC+2 (CEST)
- Postal code: 9500
- Website: www.mariagerfjord.dk

Mariagerfjord Municipality (Danish: Mariagerfjord Kommune) is a municipality (Danish, kommune) in North Jutland Region in Denmark. It covers an area of 723.63 km^{2} (2011) and has a population of 41,541 (2026).

On 1 January 2007 Mariagerfjord municipality was created as the result of Kommunalreformen ("The Municipal Reform" of 2007), consisting of the former municipalities of Arden, Hadsund and Hobro, and the major part of Mariager, and a very small part of Aalestrup and a very small part of Nørager municipality.

The municipality consists of the land around Mariager Fjord, its namesake.

== Locations ==
Locations	Population
Hobro	12,000
Hadsund	5,000
Mariager	2,500
Arden	2,500
Assens	1,400
Valsgård	1,100
Als	900
Øster Hurup	700
Astrup	500

== Politics ==
=== Municipal council ===
Mariagerfjord's municipal council consists of 29 members, elected every four years.

Below are the municipal councils elected since the Municipal Reform of 2007.

Election	Party								Total seats	Turnout	Elected mayor
Election	A	B	C	D	F	I	O	V	Total seats	Turnout	Elected mayor
2005	13	1	1		1		1	12	29	72.6%	Hans Christian Maarup (A)
2009	13		1	1	2		2	10	29	68.2%	Hans Christian Maarup (A)
2013	13				1	1	3	11	29	72.8%	Mogens Jespersen (V)
2017	11	1	1		1		3	12	29	71.1%	Mogens Jespersen (V)
Data from Kmdvalg.dk 2005, 2009, 2013 and 2017
