= Hadsund =

- Town
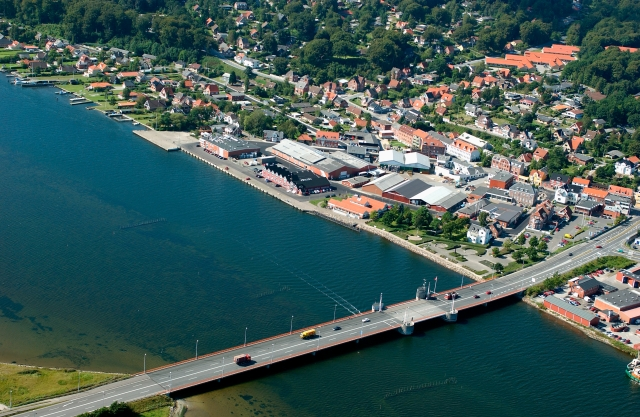

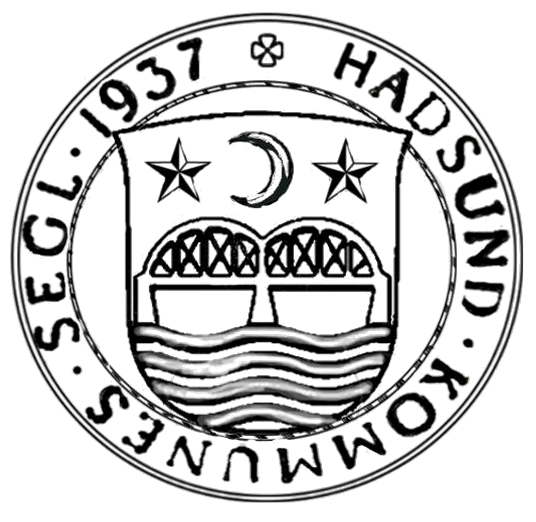
- Seal Coat of arms
- Motto(s): On the edge of the Northern Jutland (Danish: På kanten af Nordjylland)
- Location in Denmark
- Coordinates: 56°43′N 10°06′E
- Country: Denmark
- Region: North Jutland
- Municipality: Mariagerfjord
- Official birthday: 1 December 1854

Area
  - Total: 4 km^{2} (1.5 sq mi)

Population (2026)
  - Total: 4,902
- Time zone: UTC+1 (Central Europe Time)
  - Summer (DST): UTC+2
- Website: www.hadsundby.dk

Hadsund (Danish: [hæðˈsɔnˀ]) is a town in the eastern part of Jutland with a population of 4,902 (1 January 2026; 5,336 incl. Hadsund South). The town is located by the narrow strait of Hadsund, along an inlet of the Mariager Fjord. It is situated south of the city of Aalborg and north of the city of Randers. The town is a part of Mariagerfjord Municipality in the North Denmark Region. Until 2007, Hadsund was the administrative seat of Hadsund Municipality.

The area has had human presence since at least the Iron Age, though the settlement of modern Hadsund, centred around the ferry connection across the fjord, is first mentioned in 1736.

Hadsund houses multiple educational institutions, including Tech College Mariagerfjord, VUC Hadsund, Hadsund School, and Hadsund Produktionsskole in the area of vocational education. It is also home to a number of companies, including DAVA Foods, Nilfisk, and Bodylab. The western part of the greater Hadsund area is home to the oldest still-existing windmill in northern Jutland, Havnø Mølle, which was built in 1842 and operated until approximately 1927.

== Etymology ==
The place name Hadsund was initially used to refer to the waters of the narrow strait of the Mariager Fjord were the town now lies. The oldest written mentions of Hadsund come from the 15th century, when its name was recorded as Haddeswnth, Hadesundt, Haddersund, and Hadissunt.

The origin of the name Hadsund is not known with certainty. It is likely that the village of Haderup on the south side of the fjord was the source of the narrow strait's name as the name Haderup Sund (English: Haderup Strait) may have been shortened to Hadsund. The first farms that emerged on the northern side strait around the turn of the 18th century were initially referred to as Sundhusene (English: The Strait Houses). It wasn't until the 1850s that the name Sundhusene fell out of use and was replaced with Hadsund Husene (English: The Hadsund Houses), along with the houses on the southern side of the fjord.

== History ==
Archeological finds in Hadsund indicate that the area has seen human settlement since the Iron Age. A burial mound has been dated to as early as 250,000 BCE and a grave just north of the town has been dated to between 175–374 CE.

=== Fjord crossing ===
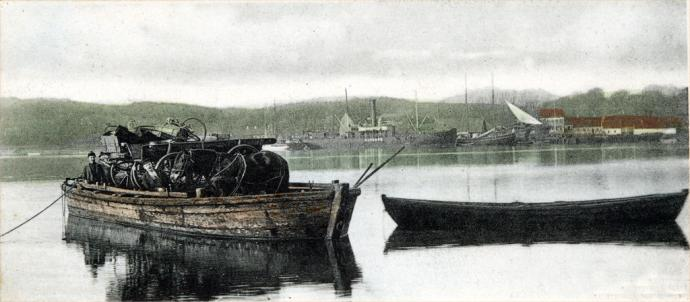
Colorized photo of the Hadsund ferry, c. 1900.

Since the at least the 12th century, Hadsund has been a crossing point over the Mariager Fjord. However, little is known of the town's history from the Middle Ages. The establishment of the settlement was tied Hadsund strait's use as a crossing point, though its growth may have relied on fishing prospects in the fjord.

In 1682, Hadsund consisted of 3 farms and 3 houses with land, cultivating a total area of 56.3 barrels of land. During the 1600s, a permanent ferry service was established crossing the Hadsund strait. The ferry was then based on the southern side of the fjord, in what is now Hadsund Syd. There were three or four houses there to accommodate the customs officer and ferrymen. Between 1772 and 1802, the ferry's base was relocated to the northern side of the fjord. In 1769, Erik Pontoppidan recorded in Den Danske Atlas that the Dalsgaard estate, located just east of village, was using the crossing at Hadsund as a loading dock for its agricultural goods.

=== Market town ===
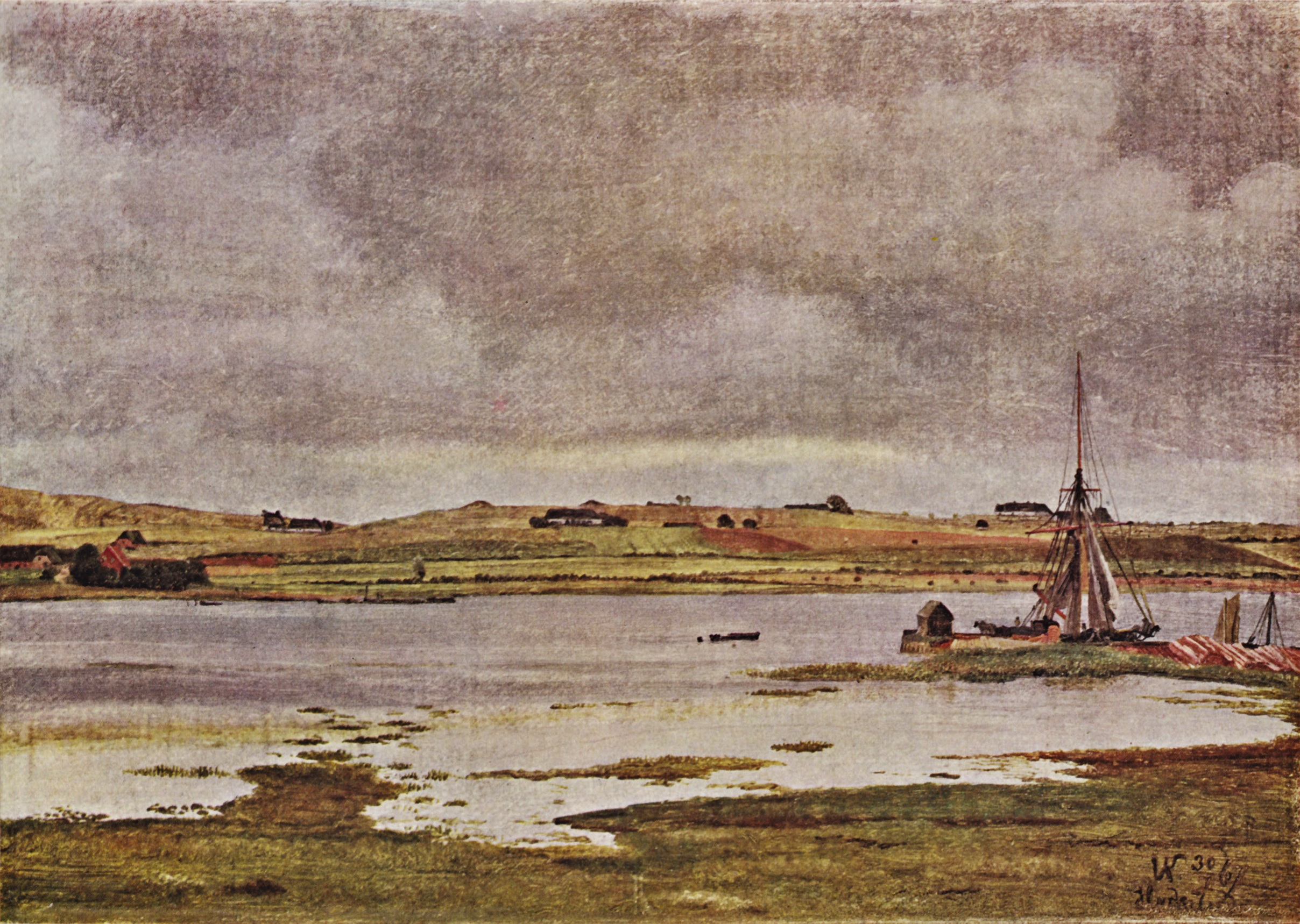
Vilhelm Kyhn, The Fiord at Hadsund, Jutland. Cloudy Weather, oil on canvas, 1867.

Hadsund was officially founded on 1 December 1854 when it received trading post privileges (handelspladsprivilegier), though it was never granted market town rights. Before 1854, only the ferry terminals on either side of the fjord could conduct trade in the area. After trading privileges were granted, the village began to develop rapidly. Several merchants established warehouses, however the financial crisis of 1857 bankrupted three of four trading houses. Despite the setbacks of the financial crisis, the city continued to expand in the late 19th century. In 1861, a commercial port was established in Hadsund. The Hadsund Craftsmen's Association (Hadsund Håndværkerforening) was formed in 1864 and became important for the town's growth.

In 1883 a railway connection was made between Hadsund and Randers, and in 1900, another link was made to Aalborg. In 1904, a railroad bridge spanning Mariager Fjord was constructed, creating easier access to the hinterland south of the inlet. The city had two railway stations, Hadsund North Station and Hadsund South Station, which both closed with the railroad in 1969. The 1904 bridge across the fjord became an important connection for road traffic traveling between eastern Himmerland and Randers. The original single lane road quickly became impractical, and in 1976 was replaced by a new bridge.

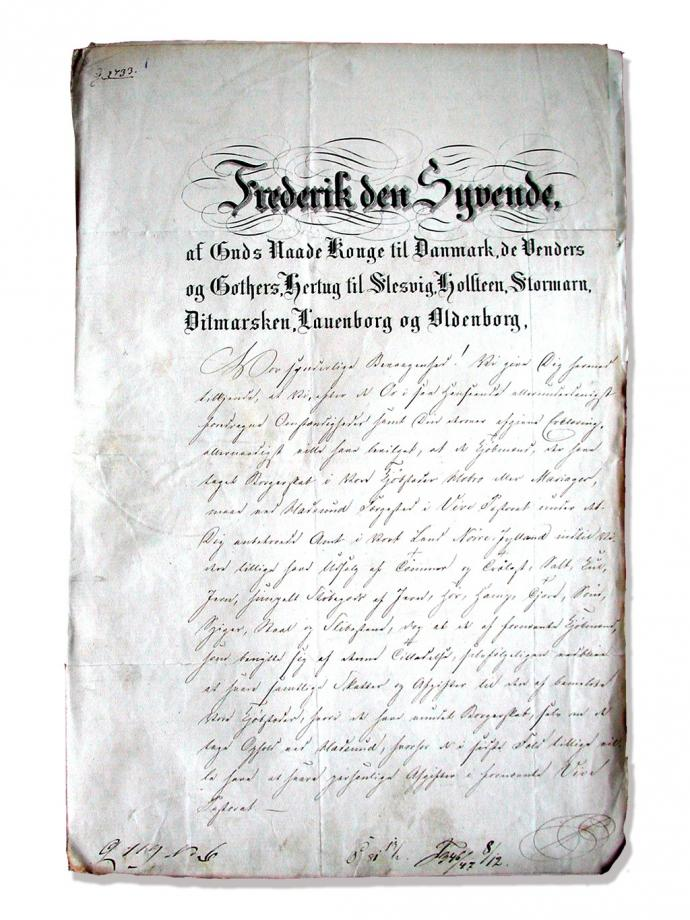
Hadsund's Handelsprivilegium (English: trading post privilege) from 1854.

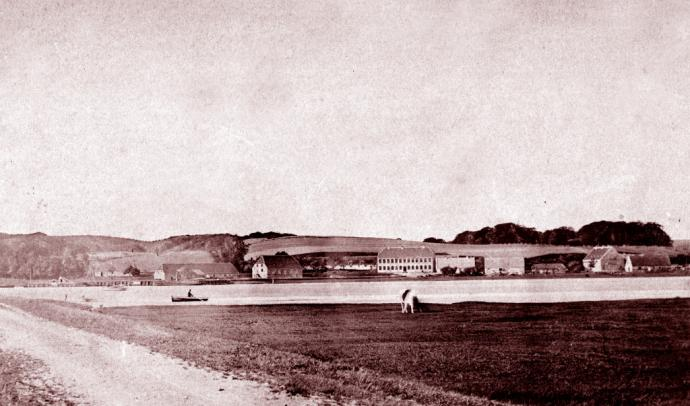
Hadsund seen from the south, 1878.

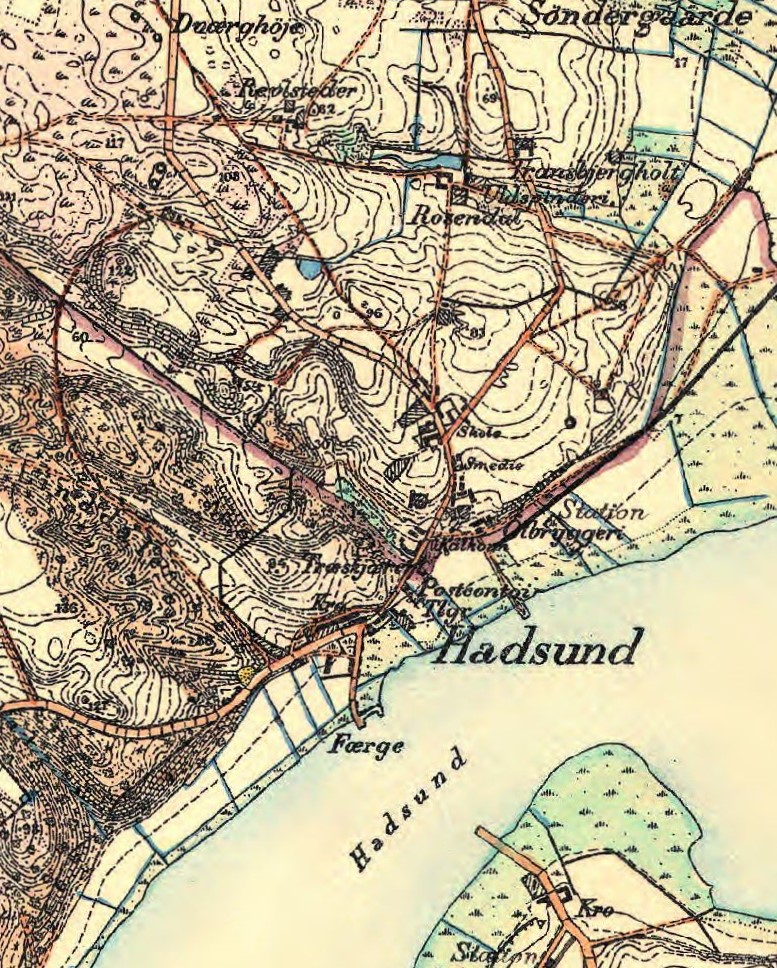
Map of Hadsund from around 1900.

=== 20th century expansion ===
Historical population
Year	Pop.	±%
1801	9	—
1840	7	−22.2%
1870	270	+3757.1%
1880	390	+44.4%
1890	701	+79.7%
1921	1,971	+181.2%
1930	2,415	+22.5%
1955	2,484	+2.9%
1986	4,000	+61.0%
1997	5,103	+27.6%
2006	5,526	+8.3%
2007	5,524	−0.0%
2008	5,542	+0.3%
2009	5,484	−1.0%
2010	5,498	+0.3%
2020	4,971	−9.6%
2022	4,973	+0.0%

By 1911, Hadsund had a school, church, railway connection, telephone exchange, pharmacy, postoffice, and water and electrical infrastructure. In 1914, Hadsund Technical School was established and in 1919 the police station was inaugurated. In 1920, the Old Maskinsnedkeri was built in the city.

In November 1931 a referendum was held on whether Hadsund should form its own independent municipality by separating from Vive and Skelund-Visborg parishes, which Hadsund was then divided between. The referendum did not have enough support and did not pass. On 27 January 1937 a second referendum was held, this time suggesting that Hadsund municipality be formed by merging the two parishes. This referendum succeeded and on 31 March 1937 Hadsund Municipality held its first meeting.

Hadsund's arms were granted to the city in 1937. The coat of arms shows mainly the 1904 bridge. The four waves symbolize the four villages that lie in the municipality: Skelund, Visborg, Vive, and Hadsund. The crescent shape symbolizes the new municipality, and the star represents longevity. The bridge was replaced in 1976, but its classic steel arches were never changed in the city arms.

Following the 1970 Danish Municipal Reform, Hadsund Municipality expanded to include territory formerly within Als Municipality and Falslev-Vindblæs Municipality. As the seat of the municipality, Hadsund had increasing influence over the region. However, the municipality's population had been in decline since the 1960s, as agriculture became mechanised and rural areas became depopulated. The substantial growth which the town of Hadsund itself saw during the mid 20th century was not enough to offset the depopulation of the municipality's shrinking rural settlements. The early 1970s saw the establishment of several industries in the town. A total of 7 companies were established by the mid 1970s.

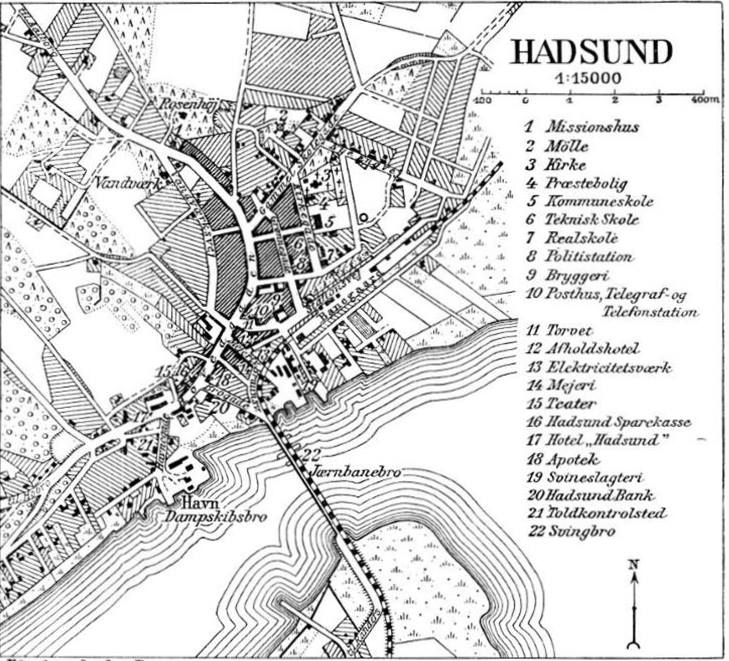
Map of Hadsund from 1923

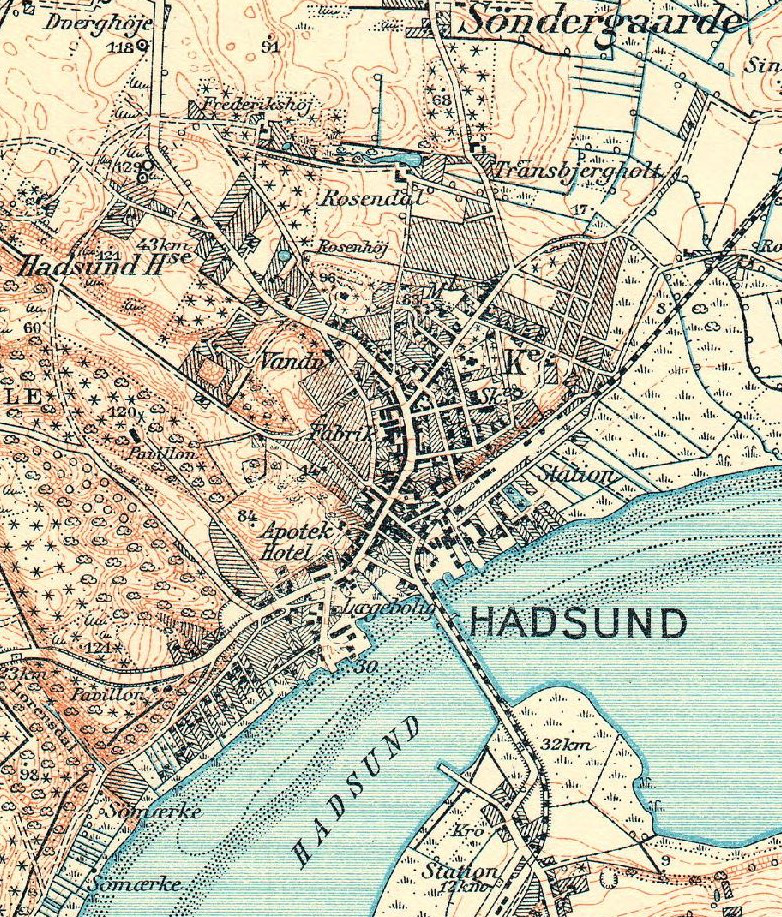
Map of Hadsund from 1937.

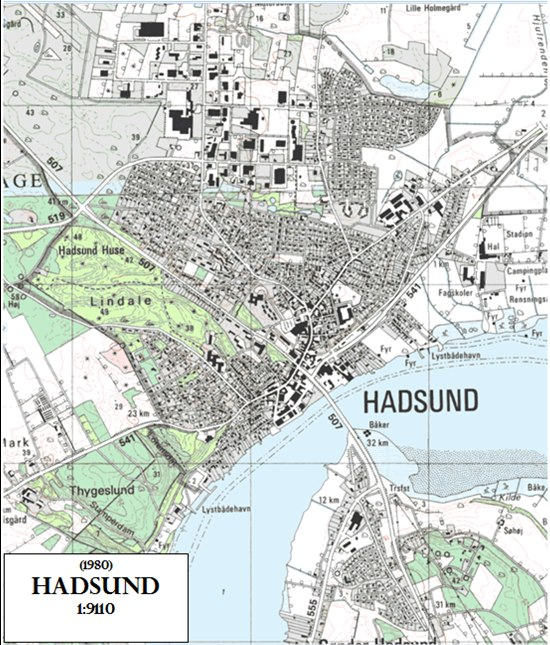
Map of Hadsund from 1980.

== Neighbourhoods ==
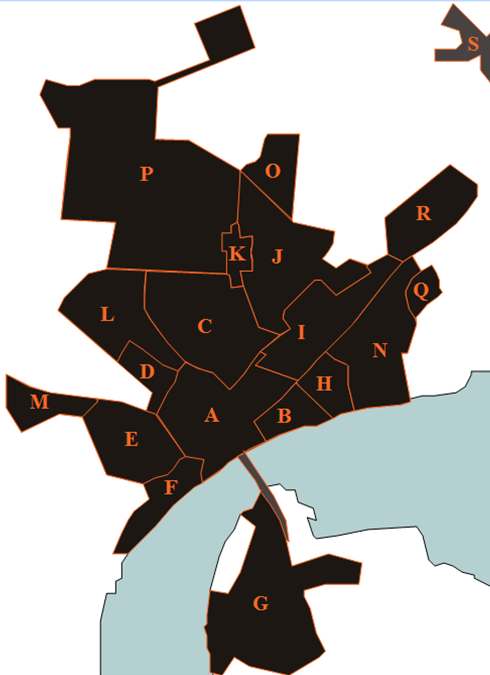
Map of neighborhoods in Hadsund and nearby settlements: A. City center; B. Munch's eng; C. Rosendals-kvarteret; D. Himmerlandsgade; E. Pip-kvarteret; F. Skov-kvarteret; G. Hadsund Syd; H. Ved Stranden; I. Ø-kvarteret; J. Holterne; K. Søndergårde; L. Hadsund Huse; M. Højmarken; N. Roligheds-kvarteret; O. Bøgelunden; P. Industri Nord; Q. Molhøj; R. Industri Øst; S. Visborg

=== City center ===
The city's center is the oldest part of Hadsund and surrounds the main street, Storegade (lit. 'Big street') which was established before 1800. The street was part of the main highway between Hobro and Aalborg until the road was reconstructed in 1970. It has constituted the city's pedestrian zone since 1990.

At the northernmost end of Storegade is Hadsund Butikscenter, the only covered shopping center in Himmerland. Hadsund Butikscenter opened on 16 August 1975, partially housed in buildings formerly used as by Johan & Axel Hornbech's jam factory.

=== Hadsund Huse ===
Hadsund Huse, also known as Hedeparken, is located in the northwest part of city, next to the Secondary Route 507. The neighbourhood was first settled around 1855, when four houses were constructed along the road leading to Aalborg. The neighbourhood's name Hadsund Huse reflect that these original houses were small homesteads. Today, the neighbourhood has around 275 residential properties.

=== Hadsund Syd ===
Hadsund Syd, originally Sønder Hadsund (English: South Hadsund) is classified as an "independent urban area" by Statistics Denmark, and its population of 434 (as of 2026) is not counted as part of the city of Hadsund's population. The area developed around the original ferry crossing point of the fjord and lies immediately south of Hadsund bridge (about 250 meters). The former Hadsund South Station is located here.

=== Søndergårde ===
Søndergårde is located in the northern part of Hadsund. From the 16th century until the 1970s, Søndergård was an independent rural village, but slowly merged with Hadsund after the establishment of a residential area and an industrial area between the two. It is located 2km from Hadsund's center and 3km from Visborg.

The neighbourhood's name, Søndergårde, is a nod to its agricultural past, as -gårde is a suffix commonly used in the names of agricultural estates. In the 1787 census, there were seven houses and four farms in Søndergårde. Today, the neighbourhood has around 450 residential properties.

== Geography ==
=== Climate ===
Much like the rest of Denmark, Hadsund is relatively dry and sunny with temperatures typically between 5 °C and 10 °C. Summers have an average maximum temperatures around 20 °C and minimums around 12 °C. Temperatures in the summer occasionally exceed 25 °C, though rarely reach beyond 30 °C. Autumn typically has temperatures between 6–12 °C and sees significant rainfall. The winters have average temperatures between -3 °C and +2 °C. Temperatures rarely fall below -10 °C and precipitation often alternates between rain, sleet, and snow. The Köppen Climate Classification subtype for the region is "Cfb" (Marine West Coast Climate/Oceanic climate).

Climate data for Hadsund
Month	Jan	Feb	Mar	Apr	May	Jun	Jul	Aug	Sep	Oct	Nov	Dec	Year
Mean daily maximum °C (°F)	3 (38)	3 (38)	5 (41)	9 (48)	14 (58)	17 (63)	19 (67)	18 (65)	14 (58)	10 (50)	7 (44)	4 (40)	11 (51)
Mean daily minimum °C (°F)	0 (32)	0 (32)	1 (34)	3 (38)	8 (46)	11 (51)	13 (55)	13 (55)	9 (49)	7 (44)	3 (38)	2 (35)	6 (43)
Average precipitation days	16	9	13	10	12	14	14	16	18	15	13	14	164
Source: Weatherbase

=== Natural environment ===
Hadsund is surrounded by several forests, including Marienhøj Plantage, of which 20 hectares has been protected since 1956. To the west of the city lies Linddalene, a forest which has been protected since 1992. Lindalene was originally part of the Dalsgaard estate, but is today owned Mariagerfjord Municipality. The north-western corner of the forest contains Lindhøj, the city's Iron Age burial mound which has been protected since 1937. A beech and deciduous forest called Thygeslund Skov is located on the western side of Hadsund. 12 hectares of the forest have been protected in 1951 to prevent urban development in the habitat closest to the fjord.

== Notable people ==
- Jørgen Lykke (1515 in Hadsund – 1583) was a Danish nobleman, diplomat and politician
- Thora Pedersen (1875 in Øster Hurup near Hadsund – 1954) a teacher, school inspector and women's rights proponent
- Hans Kirk (1898 in Hadsund – 1962) a Danish lawyer, journalist and celebrated author
- Michael Westergård Jensen (1916 – executed 1944) a merchant and member of the Danish resistance, brought up in Hadsund
- Svend Axelsson (born 1937 in Hadsund) a Danish modernist architect
- Jan Beyer Schmidt-Sørensen (born 1958) a Danish economist, grew up in Hadsund
- Jakob Axel Nielsen (born 1967) a lawyer and politician, member of the Folketing since 2005, brought up in Hadsund
- Inger Støjberg (born 1973) was the Minister for Immigration, Integration and Housing, 2015/2019, lives in Hadsund

=== Sport ===
- Ebbe Sand (born 1972 in Hadsund) a former professional footballer, over 400 club caps and 66 for Denmark
- Peter Sand (born 1972 in Hadsund) a Danish former footballer, fitness coach for Randers FC
- Thomas Christiansen (born 1973 in Hadsund) a retired football striker, over 350 club caps
- Dorte Dalum Jensen (born 1978 in Hadsund) a football defender, plays for LSK Kvinner, won over 40 caps for Denmark's women
- Thor Kristensen (born 1980 in Hadsund) team gold medallist in Denmark's rowing team in the 2004 Summer Olympics
- Peter Rosenmeier (born 1984 in Hadsund) a Danish Paralympic table tennis player
- Niklas Laustsen (born 1992 in Hadsund) a Danish BMX rider

== Gallery ==
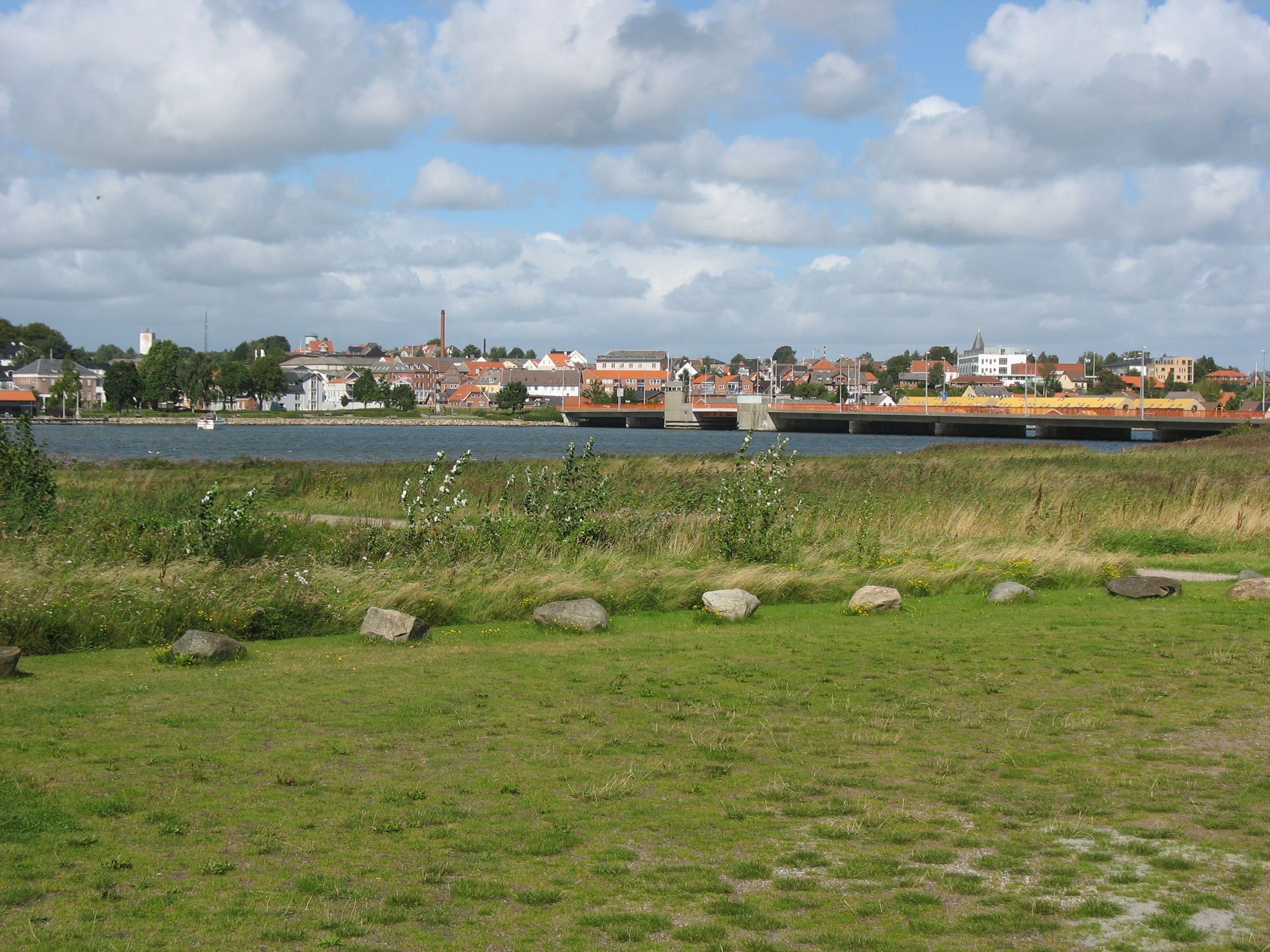
View of Hadsund and its central bridge

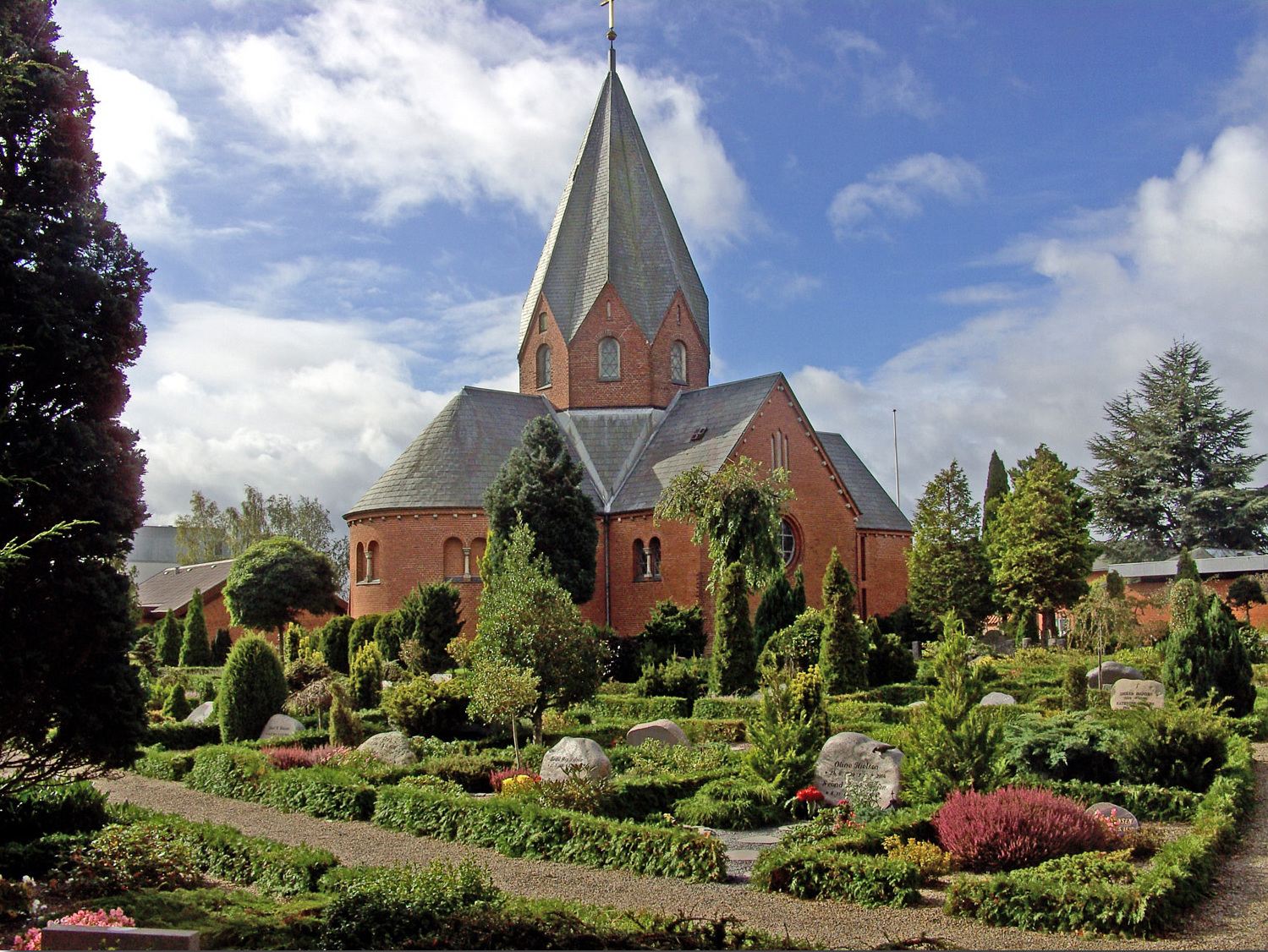
Hadsund Church

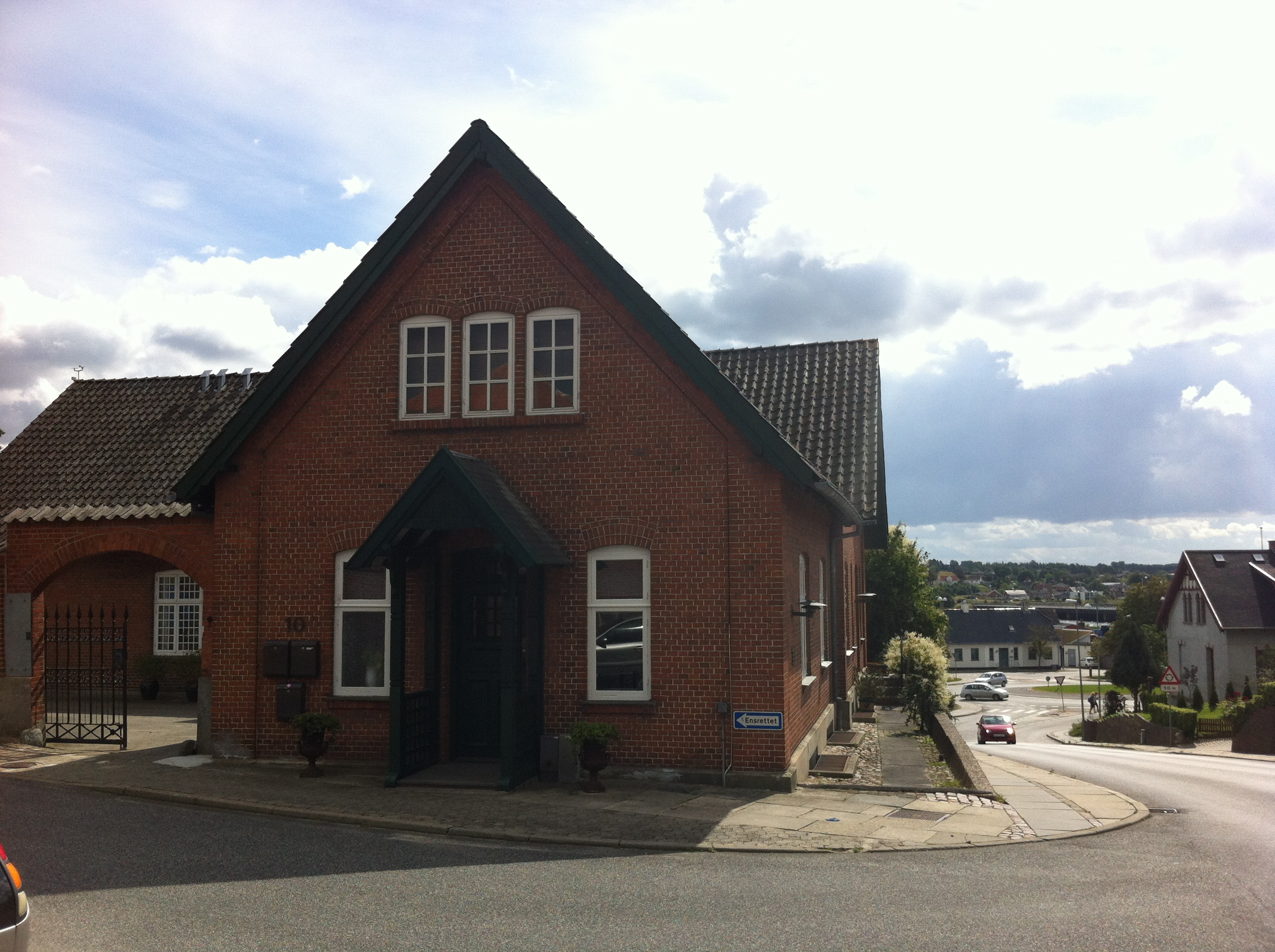
Hans Kirk's childhood home in Hadsund

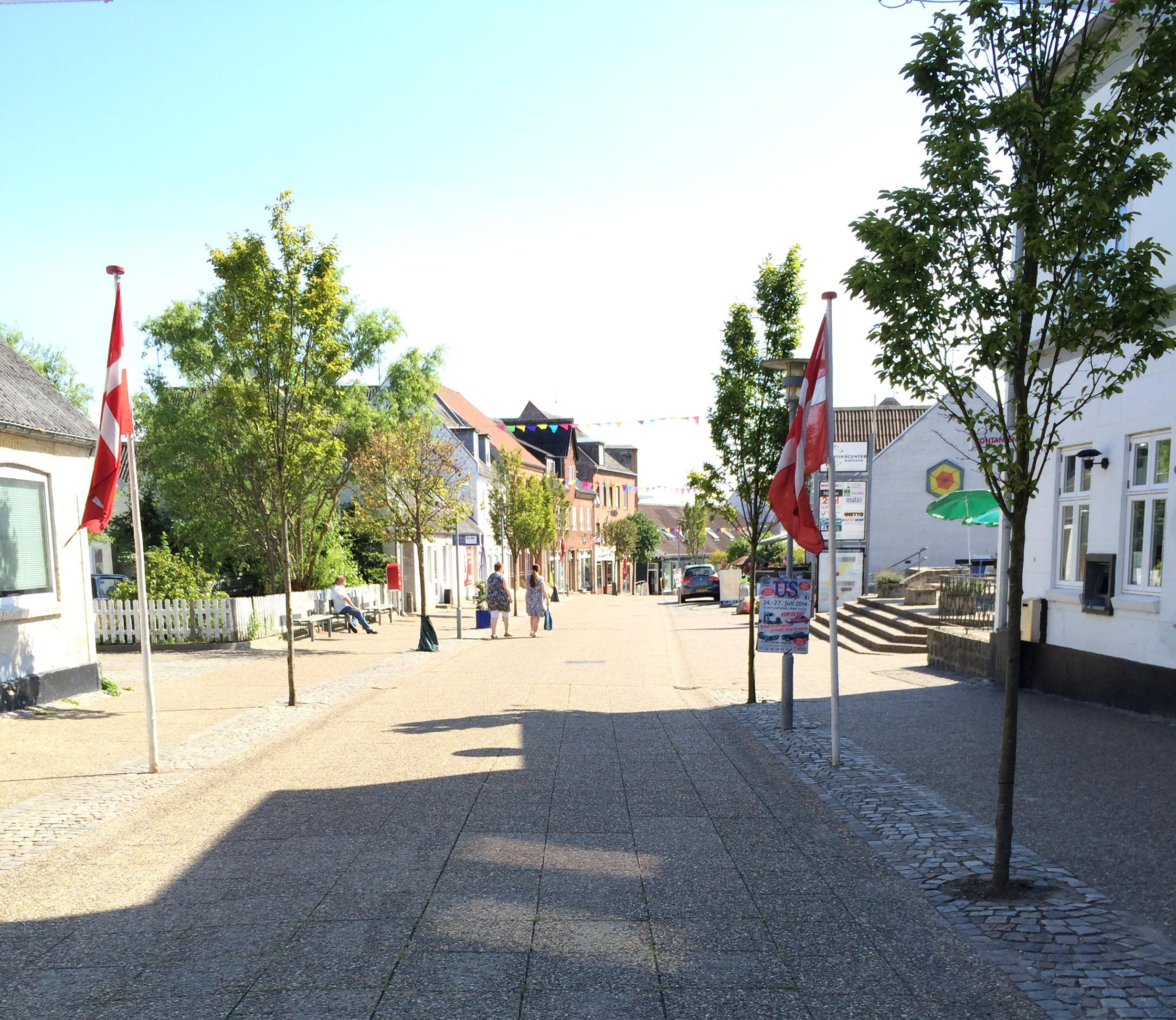
Storegade in Hadsund
