= 2025 Aalborg municipal election =

Municipal election in Denmark

← 2021	18 November 2025	2029 →

All 31 seats to the Aalborg municipal council 16 seats needed for a majority
- Turnout: 122,067 (66.7%) ▲2.1%
	First party	Second party	Third party
	A	V	F
Party	Social Democrats	Venstre	Green Left
Last election	12 seats, 36.9%	6 seats, 18.8%	2 seats, 5.6%
Seats won	10	6	3
Seat change	▼2	0	▲1
Popular vote	38,506	18,528	11,719
Percentage	32.2%	15.5%	9.8%
Swing	▼4.7%	▼3.3%	▲4.2%
	Fourth party	Fifth party	Sixth party
	C	I	B
Party	Conservatives	Liberal Alliance	Social Liberals
Last election	4 seats, 11.1%	0 seats, 2.2%	2 seats, 7.0%
Seats won	3	2	2
Seat change	▼1	▲2	0
Popular vote	11,171	8,764	7,860
Percentage	9.3%	7.3%	6.6%
Swing	▼1.8%	▲5.2%	▼0.5%
	Seventh party	Eighth party	Ninth party
	Æ	Ø	O
Party	Denmark Democrats	Red-Green Alliance	Danish People's Party
Last election	Did not stand	3 seats, 8.2%	1 seat, 4.1%
Seats won	2	2	1
Seat change	▲2	▼1	0
Popular vote	7,704	7,527	4,504
Percentage	6.4%	6.3%	3.8%
Swing	New	▼2.0%	▼0.3%
Mayor before election
Lasse Frimand Jensen
Social Democrats
Mayor after election
Lasse Frimand Jensen
Social Democrats

The 2025 Aalborg Municipal election was held on November 18, 2025, to elect the 31 members to sit in the regional council for the Aalborg Municipal council, in the period of 2026 to 2029. Following the election, it was revealed that Lasse Frimand Jensen would continue as mayor, despite the Social Democrats losing 2 seats. Jes Lunde from the Social Liberals, would later claim that he was offered the mayoral position by the right-wing bloc, but declined and instead supported the continuation of Frimand Jensen.

== Background ==
Following the 2021 election Thomas Kastrup-Larsen from the Social Democrats won the mayoral position of Aalborg Municipality for a third term. However, Kastrup-Larsen resigned as mayor in March 2023, in what TV2 described as a shock statement. Following this, Lasse Frimand Jensen took over the job, also from the Social Democrats, as mayor of the municipality.

== Electoral system ==
For elections to Danish municipalities, a number varying from 9 to 31 are chosen to be elected to the municipal council. The seats are then allocated using the D'Hondt method and a closed list proportional representation. Aalborg Municipality had 31 seats in 2025.

Unlike in Danish general elections, electoral alliances are allowed in elections to municipal councils.

== Electoral alliances ==
=== Electoral Alliance 1 ===
Party		Political alignment
A	Social Democrats	Centre-left
M	Moderates	Centre to Centre-right

=== Electoral Alliance 2 ===
Party		Political alignment
B	Social Liberals	Centre to Centre-left
F	Green Left	Centre-left to Left-wing
Ø	Red-Green Alliance	Left-wing to Far-Left
Å	The Alternative	Centre-left to Left-wing

=== Electoral Alliance 3 ===
Party		Political alignment
C	Conservatives	Centre-right
I	Liberal Alliance	Centre-right to Right-wing
K	Christian Democrats	Centre to Centre-right
O	Danish People's Party	Right-wing to Far-right
V	Venstre	Centre-right
Æ	Denmark Democrats	Right-wing to Far-right

== Results by polling station ==
Division	A	B	C	D	E	F	I	K	M	O	V	Æ	Ø	Å
Division	%	%	%	%	%	%	%	%	%	%	%	%	%	%
Gl. Lindholm Skole, Kulturhuset	39.9	7.2	6.1	0.5	0.2	12.0	5.9	0.3	1.2	4.0	8.2	5.6	8.1	0.8
PFA Kollegiet i Nørresundby	33.5	7.9	10.7	0.8	0.1	10.1	7.4	0.5	1.2	4.0	11.9	5.1	6.2	0.6
Løvvanghallen	43.3	3.6	6.2	0.6	0.2	7.9	5.0	0.7	1.9	5.9	10.1	8.0	6.1	0.4
Huset Stigsborg	36.3	5.4	8.5	0.5	0.1	10.7	7.6	0.4	1.4	5.1	11.0	4.6	7.5	0.7
Multihallen Ved Vadumhallen	42.7	3.2	16.7	0.6	0.2	4.5	5.2	1.9	0.7	4.5	9.9	8.3	1.4	0.2
Vestbjerg Idræts- og Kulturcenter	25.9	4.3	7.2	0.6	0.1	6.7	6.7	0.8	0.8	3.4	31.9	7.8	3.5	0.3
Sulsted Skolehal	32.6	2.7	6.7	0.6	0.1	6.2	4.9	1.0	1.2	4.2	19.2	16.1	4.3	0.4
Vodskov Kultur og Idrætscenter, Sal	33.0	4.4	7.1	0.4	0.2	8.8	6.2	0.3	1.1	3.9	14.9	14.8	4.3	0.7
HF og VUC Nord, Godsbanen	26.1	8.5	11.3	0.2	0.0	10.2	11.7	0.4	1.1	2.6	14.7	2.4	9.8	1.0
Vesterkærets Skole	28.2	7.7	7.6	0.6	0.2	18.1	5.5	0.6	1.2	3.4	9.1	4.2	12.2	1.3
Haraldslund	22.0	8.5	11.3	0.4	0.1	13.1	11.2	0.4	1.7	2.3	13.3	2.5	11.9	1.2
Aalborghallen	21.8	10.4	14.1	0.3	0.1	11.0	10.6	0.3	1.0	2.5	14.3	2.2	10.4	0.9
Skipperens Idrætshus	34.0	8.5	9.5	0.3	0.1	11.8	6.4	0.4	1.3	3.7	12.1	4.8	6.7	0.4
Hallen Ved Skalborggård	36.5	5.1	8.1	0.4	0.1	9.2	6.8	0.5	1.5	4.4	16.9	5.9	4.4	0.4
KFUM Hallen	21.6	13.2	16.9	0.4	0.1	14.9	7.5	0.2	1.1	2.2	13.6	3.0	4.9	0.5
Hasseris Gymnasium	24.3	11.9	15.8	0.4	0.1	11.8	6.4	0.2	1.3	2.9	16.8	3.5	4.4	0.3
Frejlev Skoles Idrætshal	45.5	4.4	7.8	0.3	0.1	5.4	6.1	0.2	0.7	3.0	14.9	7.4	3.7	0.4
Svenstruphallen	37.4	4.3	10.0	0.4	0.0	7.9	6.4	0.3	0.9	4.0	15.8	8.2	4.1	0.2
Sønderbroskolen	31.8	7.8	9.0	0.3	0.1	11.3	8.4	0.6	1.0	3.3	12.9	3.2	9.8	0.6
Nordkraft	23.4	9.5	13.0	0.3	0.1	10.0	11.3	0.4	1.9	2.4	15.9	2.7	8.5	0.8
Gigantium	30.3	8.1	10.9	0.3	0.1	10.6	7.7	0.7	1.6	3.0	13.6	4.3	8.1	0.6
Vejgaardhallen	32.5	7.8	8.0	0.3	0.1	11.8	6.9	0.9	1.3	4.3	9.9	5.3	9.9	1.0
Vejgaard Østre Skole	38.5	7.6	7.8	0.2	0.1	11.2	5.3	0.6	1.0	3.6	9.4	6.4	7.8	0.6
Mellervangskolens Idrætshal	36.8	5.8	6.4	0.5	0.0	11.4	7.0	1.4	1.0	5.5	9.3	7.8	6.2	0.9
Klaruphallen	34.8	5.9	10.3	0.4	0.1	7.4	6.5	0.1	1.2	4.4	17.5	7.8	3.4	0.2
Gug Skole	33.8	6.2	11.6	0.1	0.1	9.8	6.6	0.5	1.8	4.1	15.6	5.7	3.7	0.3
Gistrup Skoles Idrætshal	31.6	6.9	12.1	0.4	0.0	12.0	4.6	0.3	1.2	3.1	15.2	7.0	5.3	0.4
Aalborghus Gymnasium	40.7	5.6	7.0	0.5	0.2	10.6	5.5	1.0	1.8	5.3	8.6	5.1	7.7	0.6
Ferslev Skole	33.9	3.6	8.3	1.5	0.1	7.2	7.0	0.2	1.5	5.0	15.4	12.3	3.6	0.2
Tornhøjhallen	39.9	5.3	5.9	0.7	0.1	10.4	5.4	0.6	1.2	5.8	8.3	5.7	10.1	0.6
Vester Hassing Hallen	33.5	2.5	5.6	1.3	0.2	7.7	13.4	0.3	0.7	3.7	17.7	10.7	2.6	0.2
Hals Skole	39.8	2.1	4.0	1.2	0.1	4.9	11.3	0.3	0.7	6.1	16.2	10.8	2.4	0.3
Ulstedhallen	22.3	1.7	2.0	1.9	0.1	3.9	27.5	0.1	0.3	3.5	21.8	11.9	2.6	0.1
Nibe Hallen	24.8	4.5	4.8	0.4	0.0	4.5	3.9	0.2	0.5	2.1	46.2	5.4	2.4	0.3
Farstruphallen	20.1	4.7	4.5	1.3	0.0	4.0	5.0	0.5	0.5	3.0	39.8	12.8	3.6	0.2
Idrætscentret Kongerslev	25.4	2.2	3.8	1.1	0.0	3.5	3.3	0.0	0.2	5.5	39.4	12.8	2.8	0.0
Mou Hotel	33.2	2.5	5.4	0.6	0.1	8.1	3.2	0.4	0.7	7.3	17.5	16.0	4.4	0.4
Båndby - Hallen	32.5	3.9	8.0	0.8	0.1	8.3	6.0	0.4	0.4	4.0	20.1	12.7	2.5	0.3

== Results ==
Party		Votes	%	+/-	Seats	+/-
Aalborg Municipality
A	Social Democrats	38,506	32.19	-4.69	10	-2
V	Venstre	18,528	15.49	-3.30	6	0
F	Green Left	11,719	9.80	+4.24	3	+1
C	Conservatives	11,171	9.34	-1.78	3	-1
I	Liberal Alliance	8,764	7.33	+5.16	2	+2
B	Social Liberals	7,860	6.57	-0.48	2	0
Æ	Denmark Democrats	7,704	6.44	New	2	New
Ø	Red-Green Alliance	7,527	6.29	-1.96	2	-1
O	Danish People's Party	4,504	3.77	-0.33	1	0
M	Moderates	1,409	1.18	New	0	New
Å	The Alternative	663	0.55	+0.24	0	0
D	New Right	593	0.50	-3.06	0	-1
K	Christian Democrats	565	0.47	-0.26	0	0
E	Vendelbolisten	114	0.10	New	0	New
Total		119,627	100	N/A	31	N/A
Invalid votes		321	0.18	+0.01		
Blank votes		2,119	1.16	+0.22		
Turnout		122,067	66.70	+2.09		
Source: valg.dk

== Opinion polls ==
Polling firm	Fieldwork date	Sample size	A	V	C	Ø	B	F	O	D	I	K	Å	E	M	Æ	Others	Lead
Epinion	4 Sep - 13 Oct 2025	571	32.9	14.3	3.6	7.7	4.7	10.4	5.5	–	9.6	–	0.2	–	1.8	8.5	0.9	18.6
2024 european parliament election	9 Jun 2024		17.5	13.5	7.7	7.2	7.5	15.7	4.7	–	7.5	–	3.2	–	5.1	10.3	–	1.8
2022 general election	1 Nov 2022		33.3	13.1	4.3	4.5	4.1	7.0	1.6	2.5	9.2	0.4	2.7	–	7.2	9.4	–	20.2
2021 regional election	16 Nov 2021		35.6	23.1	11.6	7.3	5.5	5.7	3.3	3.5	1.8	0.8	0.4	–	–	–	–	12.5
2021 municipal election	16 Nov 2021		36.9 (12)	18.8 (6)	11.1 (4)	8.2 (3)	7.0 (2)	5.6 (2)	4.1 (1)	3.6 (1)	2.2 (0)	0.7 (0)	0.3 (0)	–	–	–	–	18.1
