= 2025 North Denmark regional election =

- 18 November 2025

All 25 seats to the North Denmark regional council 13 seats needed for a majority
- Turnout: 330,533 (69.3%) ▲1.6%
	First party	Second party	Third party
	V	A	C
Party	Venstre	Social Democrats	Conservatives
Last election	11 seats, 25.2%	15 seats, 35.0%	7 seats, 15.8%
Seats won	8	6	3
Seat change	▼3	▼9	▼4
Popular vote	86,063	79,712	32,484
Percentage	27.0%	25.0%	10.2%
Swing	▲1.8%	▼10.0%	▼5.6%
	Fourth party	Fifth party	Sixth party
	Æ	F	I
Party	Denmark Democrats	Green Left	Liberal Alliance
Last election	Did not stand	2 seats, 4.2%	0 seats, 1.1%
Seats won	2	2	1
Seat change	▲2	0	▲1
Popular vote	29,240	27,229	16,082
Percentage	9.2%	8.5%	5.0%
Swing	New	▲4.3%	▲3.9%
	Seventh party	Eighth party	Ninth party
	O	B	Ø
Party	Danish People's Party	Social Liberals	Red-Green Alliance
Last election	1 seat, 3.9%	1 seat, 3.7%	2 seats, 4.6%
Seats won	1	1	1
Seat change	0	0	▼1
Popular vote	14,458	12,475	12,338
Percentage	4.5%	3.9%	3.9%
Swing	▲0.7%	▲0.2%	▼0.8%
Chairperson before election
Mads Duedahl
Venstre
Chairperson after election
Mads Duedahl
Venstre

The 2025 North Denmark Regional election will be held on November 18, 2025, to elect the 25 members to sit in the regional council for the North Denmark Regional council, in the period of 2026 to 2029. Mads Duedahl from Venstre, would take the chairperson.

== Background ==
Following the 2021 election, Mads Duedahl from Venstre became chairperson for his first term, becoming the first chairperson not from the Social Democrats in the region.

Since their establishment in 2007, Denmark’s five regions have been subject to ongoing political debate. In June 2024, the government's Health Structure Commission proposed three models for reorganizing the healthcare system, two of which involved abolishing the existing regions. In the end, the regions were retained, however with a reformartion of, among other things, the regional councils. Each of the five regional councils, had 41 seats, from their first election in 2005 to the 2021 election. The reform resulted in three regions, including the North Denmark Region, retaining their existing boundaries and continuing unchanged, while the two other regions were merged to form a new entity. As part of the reform, this region will elect only 25 council members.

The Social Liberals, Green Left, and the Red-Green Alliance have announced that, untraditionally, they would support the continuation of Mads Duedahl of Venstre as chairperson, rather than Arne Boelt of the Social Democrats.

== Notional results 2021 ==
=== 2021 Election Results and notional results with 25 Seats Contested ===
Parties	Vote		Seats		
Parties	Votes	%	Actual Seats	Notional Seats	+ / -
Social Democrats	108,637	35.0	15	9	-6
Venstre	78,337	25.2	11	7	-4
Conservatives	49,069	15.8	7	4	-3
Red–Green Alliance	14,370	4.6	2	1	-1
New Right	13,233	4.3	2	1	-1
Green Left	13,073	4.2	2	1	-1
Danish People's Party	12,060	3.9	1	1	0
Social Liberals	11,520	3.7	1	1	0
Total	310,538	100.0	41	25	-16

== Electoral system ==
For elections to Danish Regional councils, a number varying from 25 to 47 are chosen to be elected to the Regional council. The seats are then allocated using the D'Hondt method and a closed list proportional representation. The North Denmark Region had 25 seats in 2025.

== Electoral alliances ==
=== Electoral Alliance 1 ===
Party		Political alignment
B	Social Liberals	Centre to Centre-left
F	Green Left	Centre-left to Left-wing
Ø	Red-Green Alliance	Left-wing to Far-Left
Å	The Alternative	Centre-left to Left-wing

=== Electoral Alliance 2 ===
Party		Political alignment
C	Conservatives	Centre-right
I	Liberal Alliance	Centre-right to Right-wing
K	Christian Democrats	Centre to Centre-right
M	Moderates	Centre to Centre-right
O	Danish People's Party	Right-wing to Far-right
V	Venstre	Centre-right
Æ	Denmark Democrats	Right-wing to Far-right

== Results by constituency and municipality ==
=== Results by constituency ===
Division	A	B	C	D	F	I	K	L	M	O	V	Æ	Ø	Å
Division	%	%	%	%	%	%	%	%	%	%	%	%	%	%
North Jutland	25.0	3.9	10.2	0.3	8.5	5.0	0.5	0.5	0.9	4.5	27.0	9.2	3.9	0.5

=== Results by municipality ===
Division	A	B	C	D	F	I	K	L	M	O	V	Æ	Ø	Å
Division	%	%	%	%	%	%	%	%	%	%	%	%	%	%
Læsø	15.6	2.9	29.2	0.6	6.2	1.6	0.3	0.4	1.1	9.3	13.1	16.1	2.9	0.6
Frederikshavn	27.7	1.5	8.3	0.3	8.6	3.8	0.4	0.4	2.0	5.8	28.0	10.9	2.1	0.3
Hjørring	30.8	4.0	12.6	0.2	5.6	2.8	0.5	1.9	0.9	4.6	25.1	7.9	3.0	0.2
Brønderslev	24.5	2.4	9.2	0.6	9.6	3.5	0.3	0.5	0.8	4.8	29.8	11.0	2.8	0.2
Jammerbugt	22.0	1.7	7.3	0.2	6.5	4.9	0.8	1.5	0.4	5.7	37.8	9.0	2.0	0.3
Thisted	24.5	2.4	11.8	0.3	7.1	7.1	0.6	0.2	0.4	5.5	23.6	12.0	4.1	0.4
Morsø	31.5	1.8	9.7	0.2	3.0	2.2	0.2	0.1	0.3	3.6	37.2	7.9	2.1	0.2
Vesthimmerland	15.2	1.9	22.8	0.3	6.9	3.4	1.0	0.2	0.3	3.4	29.8	13.3	1.4	0.1
Rebild	17.3	5.9	17.4	0.1	9.0	4.2	0.3	0.2	0.6	3.4	24.7	12.9	3.6	0.4
Mariagerfjord	31.9	1.9	6.8	0.1	6.6	4.4	0.4	0.2	0.8	4.6	22.9	16.4	2.0	1.0
Aalborg	24.3	6.1	7.8	0.3	11.0	6.7	0.5	0.2	1.1	4.1	25.4	5.8	6.0	0.6

== Results ==
Party		Votes	%	+/-	Seats	+/-
North Denmark Region
V	Venstre	86,063	27.02	+1.80	8	-3
A	Social Democrats	79,712	25.03	-9.96	6	-9
C	Conservatives	32,484	10.20	-5.60	3	-4
Æ	Denmark Democrats	29,240	9.18	New	2	New
F	Green Left	27,229	8.55	+4.34	2	0
I	Liberal Alliance	16,082	5.05	+3.93	1	+1
O	Danish People's Party	14,458	4.54	+0.66	1	0
B	Social Liberals	12,475	3.92	+0.21	1	0
Ø	Red-Green Alliance	12,338	3.87	-0.75	1	-1
M	Moderates	2,895	0.91	New	0	New
L	Vendelbo-Listen	1,642	0.52	New	0	New
K	Christian Democrats	1,545	0.49	-0.39	0	0
Å	The Alternative	1,461	0.46	+0.14	0	0
D	New Right	874	0.27	-3.99	0	-2
Total		318,498	100	N/A	25	N/A
Invalid votes		835	0.17	-0.03		
Blank votes		11,200	2.34	-0.08		
Turnout		330,533	69.18	+1.56		
Source: valg.dk

== Opinion polls ==
Polling firm	Fieldwork date	Sample size	A	V	C	Ø	D	F	O	B	I	K	Å	L	M	Æ	Others	Lead
Epinion	4 Sep - 13 Oct 2025	270	28.5	20.9	4.8	4.8	–	7.9	5.3	3.4	7.6	–	0.0	–	1.5	15.3	0.0	7.6
2024 european parliament election	9 Jun 2024		18.1	17.2	7.0	4.9	–	12.9	6.0	5.1	6.4	–	2.1	–	4.9	15.5	–	0.9
2022 general election	1 Nov 2022		34.0	14.0	4.4	3.0	3.5	5.7	1.9	2.4	7.1	0.4	1.9	–	6.3	15.2	–	18.8
2021 municipal elections	16 Nov 2021		34.6	26.4	13.1	4.6	3.7	4.7	3.9	4.0	0.9	0.6	0.4	–	–	–	–	8.2
2021 regional election	16 Nov 2021		35.0 (15)	25.2 (11)	15.8 (7)	4.6 (2)	4.3 (2)	4.2 (2)	3.9 (1)	3.7 (1)	1.1 (0)	0.9 (0)	0.3 (0)	–	–	–	–	9.8
