= SSP =

SSP or ssp may refer to:

== Arts and entertainment ==
- Silversun Pickups, an American alternative rock band
- Super Sonic Power, a line of toys by Kenner Products in the 1970s
- Scottish Society of Playwrights, a trade union

== Companies ==
- E. W. Scripps Company, stock symbol
- SSP Group, British company

== Economics and finance ==
- Single Shared Platform, the basis of the TARGET2 real-time gross settlement system
- South Sudanese pound (by ISO code)
- Statutory sick pay, in the United Kingdom

== Government and politics ==
=== Political parties and organizations ===
- Party of Freedom and Justice (Stranka slobode i pravde), a political party in Serbia
- Samyukta Socialist Party, in India from 1964 to 1972
- Scottish Socialist Party, founded in 1998
- Sipah-e-Sahaba Pakistan
- Sehajdhari Sikh Party, founded in 2001
- Shram Sanskriti Party, founded in 2025

=== Other uses in government and politics ===
- Secretariat of Public Security, a federal ministry of the Mexican Executive Cabinet
  - Ministry of Public Security (Mexico City)
- Sehat Sahulat Program, a Pakistani healthcare initiative
- Senior Superintendent of Police, a senior rank in Indian Police Service

== Organizations ==
- Summer Science Program, an academic summer program
- Satellite Sentinel Project, to deter atrocities
- Scottish Society of Playwrights, a trade union
- Sigma Sigma Phi, an osteopathic medical honor society
- Society for Science & the Public
- Society for Scholarly Publishing
- Swiss Society of Physiology, see Life Sciences Switzerland

== Places ==
- Sham Shui Po station, Hong Kong metro (by station code)

== Science and technology ==
=== Biology and ecology ===
- Shared Socioeconomic Pathways, for greenhouse gas scenarios
- Species Survival Plan, to home endangered animals in a zoo
- Subspecies, abbreviated as ssp.

=== Computing and telecommunications ===
- Sakura Script Player, for Ukagaka mascot software
- Secure Simple Pairing, a Bluetooth pairing mechanism
- Security Service Provider
- Sender Signing Practices, later Author Domain Signing Practices for E-mail
- Serial SCSI Protocol, for SAS disk drives
- Service switching point
- Storage service provider
- Supplementary Special-purpose Plane, in Unicode
- System Service Processor
- System Structure and Parameterization, a simulation system exchange format, companion to Functional Mock-up Interface
- System Support Program, the operating system of the IBM System/34 and System/36 computers
- Synchronous Serial Port
- Supply-side platform, in online advertising
- Subset sum problem, an NP-complete decision problem
- Six-state protocol, a quantum key distribution protocol

=== Medicine and psychology ===
- Specialist in School Psychology
- Swedish Universities Scales of Personality
- Single Specific Primer, in SSP-PCR

=== Spaceflight ===
- Space-based solar power
- Space Studies Program, at the International Space University
- Surface Science Package, part of the Huygens probe

=== Other uses in science and technology ===
- Sardar Sarovar Project, dam project in India
- Sonority Sequencing Principle, in linguistics

== Other uses ==
- Volkswagen Group Scalable Systems Platform, a car platform
- Special Service Package, for North American police vehicles
- Specialist schools programme, educational programme in the United Kingdom
- Sungai Buloh-Serdang-Putrajaya MRT Line, a rapid transit line in Malaysia
- Needle and syringe programmes, also known as Syringe Service Programs (SSP)
- Spanish Sign Language, an ISO 639-3 code
