= Farstrup =

Village in Denmark

Coordinates: 56.9828°N 9.4625°E

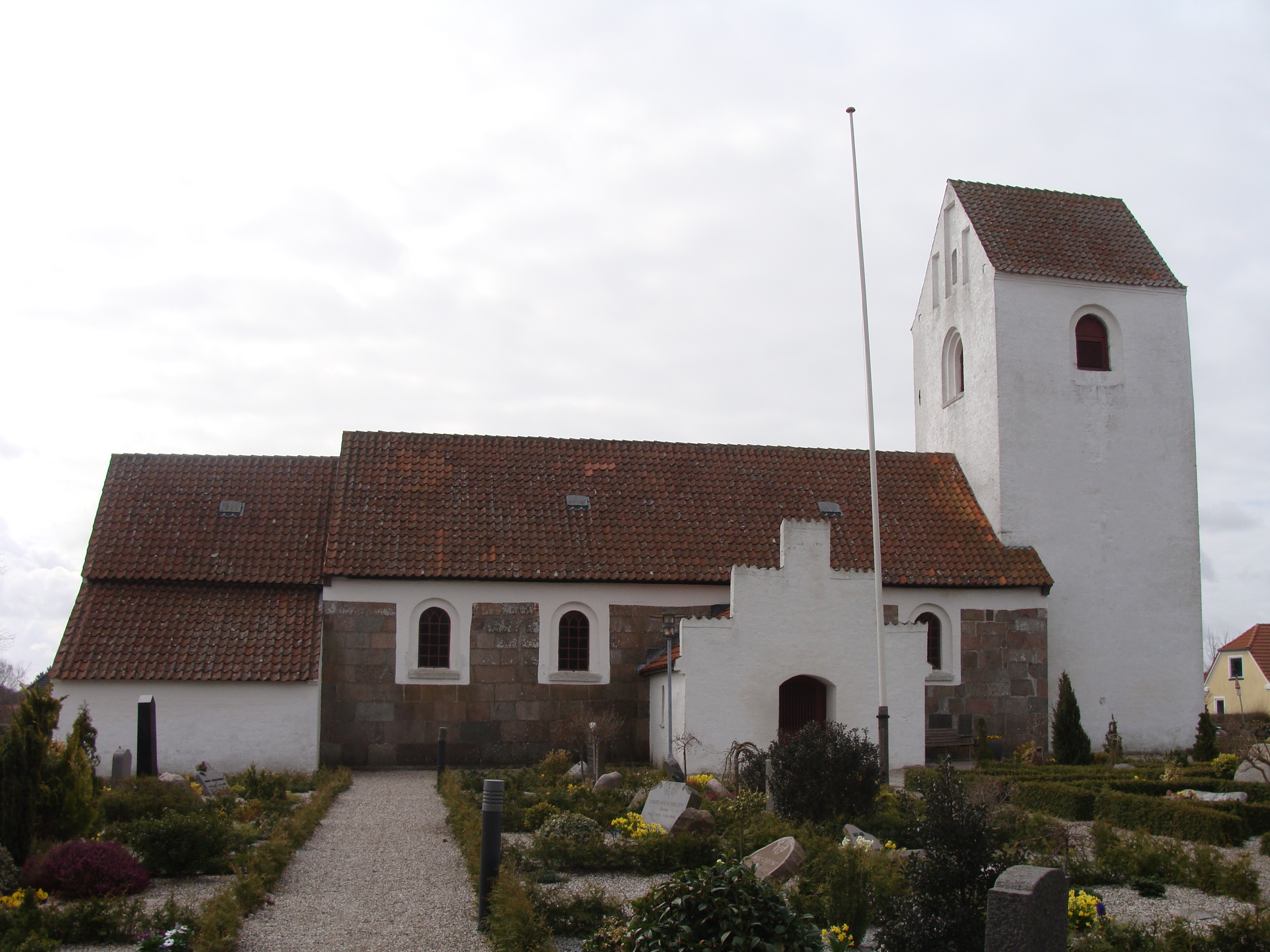
Farstrup Kirke

Farstrup is a village, with a population of 441 (1 January 2026), in Northern Himmerland in Denmark. It is located between Nibe (13 km. East) and Løgstør (14 km. West) and 4 km south of Staun. It is located in Aalborg Municipality, North Jutland Region. A branch of the Ancient Road crosses north of the Limfjord Farstrup. Besides Staun, the nearest villages are Kolby, Barmer, Lundby and St. Ajstrup. Farstrup is around 29 km / 18 mi away from North Denmark's capital Aalborg (Aalborg) and 241 km / 150 mi from Denmark's capital Copenhagen (Copenhagen) with 3 airport location within 50 km.

Farstrup school Farstrup church and Spigo are public institutions. There are bus connections to Aalborg and Løgstør and school bus connection to the area. Farstrup also contains food retailing, power plant, riding school, carpentry shop, Christmas tree wholesaler, community hall, water works, a consulting engineering firm, sports hall and a garage. A doctor's office moved in 1999 to Nibe.

Before 2007, Farstrup was the second largest village in Nibe Municipality, but is now incorporated in Aalborg Municipality.
