= Per Clausen =

Danish politician

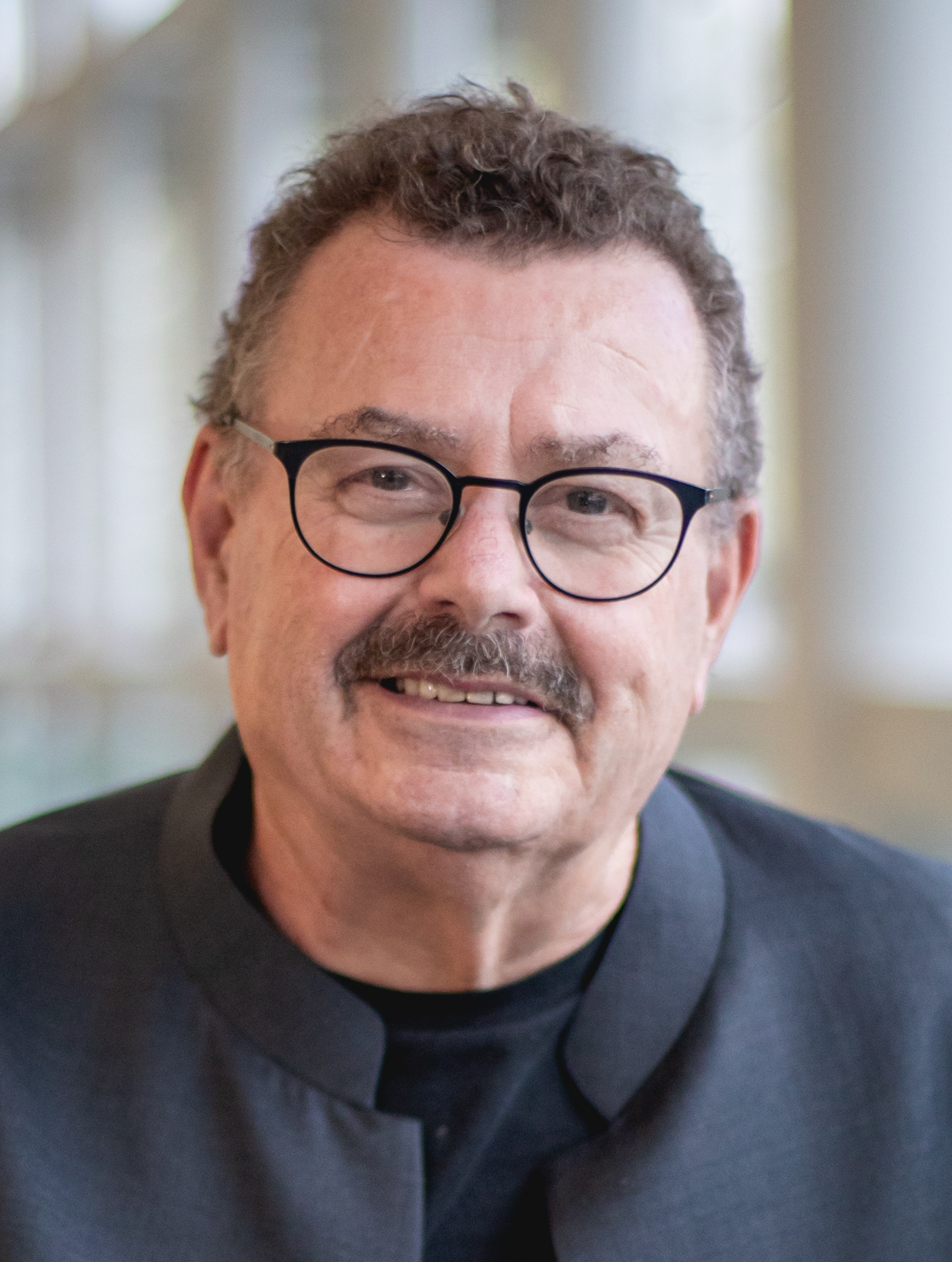
- Per Clausen in 2024

Member of Parliament for East Jutland
- In office 2005–2015

Personal details
- Born: 20 February 1955 (age 71) Kongsvinger, Norway
- Party: Red–Green Alliance
- Education: Cand.phil.
- Profession: Politician

Per Clausen (born 20 February 1955) is a Danish politician from the Red-Green Alliance. Since 2013, he has served on the Aalborg Municipal council in Aalborg Municipality, where, in 2022, he became a deputy mayor for climate and energy.

Between 2005 and 2015, he represented the Red-Green Alliance in the Folketing.

In March 2023, he provided himself as the lead candidate for the Red-Green Alliance to the 2024 European Parliament election, and it was later announced that he would become the lead candidate.

== Life ==
Per Clausen was born in Kongsvinger as the son of painter Frede Aage Clausen and laundry owner Grethe Clausen. He was born in Kongsvinger, Norway, but grew up in multiple places in Jutland, finally settling in Aalborg and taking the Danish exam in 1972 from Poul Paghsgades Skole.

Through time, he has had multiple occupations such as factory worker, car mechanic, laundry owner, teacher and trade unionist.

== Work in trade unions ==
Since his youth, Per Clausen has been politically active in the trade unions and on the Danish left.

He began in the 1970s as a member of the Danish General Workers' Union-factory youth, and has since taken on multiple position of trust in the trade unions. In 1994, he was elected as trade unionist for Dansk Magisterforening.

== Member of parliament ==
In 2005, he was elected to the Folketing for the Red-Green Alliance, in the North Jutland County constituency. Here he represented the party until 2015, where he was barred from another parliament term due to the rotation princip of the Red-Green Alliance. In the period of his parliamentary career, he was among other things, the party's EU-spokesperon, environmental-spokesperson, health-spokesperson and group-leader for the parliamentary group. Between 2014 and 2015 he was a member of the parliaments bureau. Per Clausen has been described as being a diligent MP and has on multiple occasions, earned the title as the most pertinacious question-raiser of the § 20-spørgsmål in the Folketing. In 2008, LGBT Danmark named him politician of the year, citing his work to secure rights for gay, bisexual and trans people.

== Membership of Aalborg Municipal Council ==
Since 2013, Clausen has been a member of the Aalborg Municipal Council. He was the lead candidate for the Red-Green Alliance in the municipal council election in 2013, and was at the time a part of winning the party's three seats in a city, where the party had never won representation before. During the 2021 election, he received 2,312 personal votes, which was the fifth highest.

He was also elected in 2017 and 2021. He has been the municipality's councilor for Climate and Energy since 2022. Allerede i slutningen af 2021 var Clausen fungerende rådmand, da rådmand Lasse Olsen var sygemeldt.

Clausen has been a member of the board of directors in the Kommunernes Landsforening since 8 March 2018.

=== Parliamentary career ===
Red-Green Alliances candidate in Aarhus East from 2007, in Aalborg East 2002–2007, in Frederiksborg County constituency 2000–2002, in North Jutland County constituency 1989–2000. Left Socialists candidate North Jutland County constituency 1977–1988.
