= Mou, Denmark =

Mou
- Town
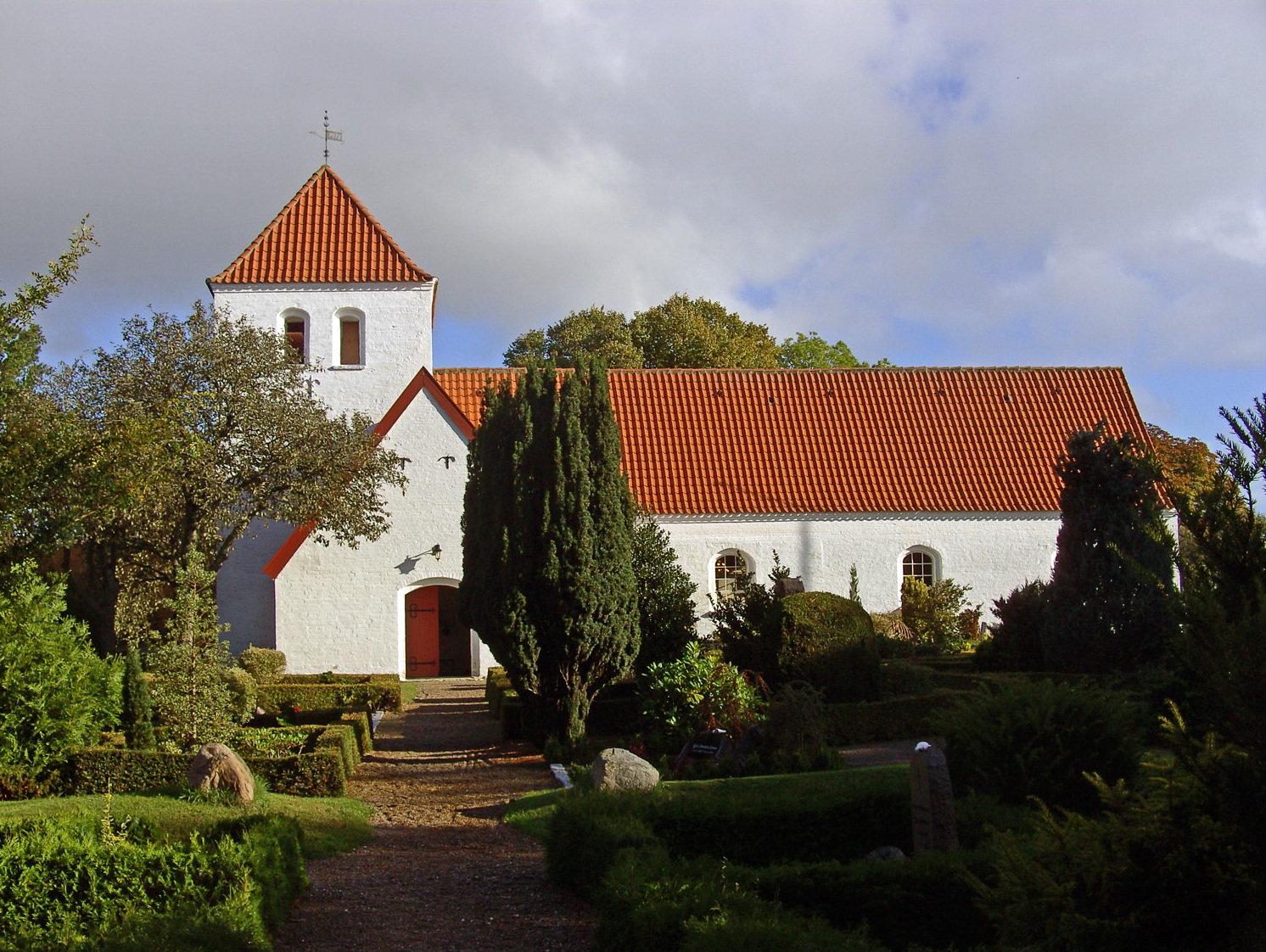
- Mou Church

- Location in North Jutland Region Mou (Denmark)
- Coordinates: 56°58′8″N 10°13′19″E
- Country: Denmark
- Region: North Jutland Region
- Municipality: Aalborg Municipality

Area
  - Urban: 0.8 km^{2} (0.31 sq mi)

Population (2026)
  - Urban: 1,024
  - Urban density: 1,300/km^{2} (3,300/sq mi)
- Time zone: UTC+1 (CET)
  - Summer (DST): UTC+2 (CEST)
- Postal code: DK-9280 Storvorde

Mou is a small town, with a population of 1,024 (1 January 2026), in Aalborg Municipality, North Jutland Region in Denmark.

Mou is located 22 km east of Aalborg, in the northern part of Lille Vildmose, just south of the Limfjord near its eastern entry from the Kattegat.

Mou Church is located in the town.
