= 2021 Aalborg municipal election =

- 16 November 2021

All 31 seats to the Aalborg Municipal Council 16 seats needed for a majority
- Turnout: 116,325 (64.6%) ▼3.1pp
	First party	Second party	Third party
	A	V	C
Party	Social Democrats	Venstre	Conservatives
Last election	17 seats, 48.7%	8 seats, 21.9%	1 seat, 4.0%
Seats won	12	6	4
Seat change	▼5	▼2	▲3
Popular vote	42,149	21,470	12,709
Percentage	36.9%	18.8%	11.1%
Swing	▼11.8%	▼3.1%	▲7.1%
	Fourth party	Fifth party	Sixth party
	Ø	B	F
Party	Red–Green Alliance	Social Liberals	Green Left
Last election	2 seats, 6.4%	1 seat, 3.1%	0 seats, 2.7%
Seats won	3	2	2
Seat change	▲1	▲1	▲2
Popular vote	9,428	8,055	6,353
Percentage	8.2%	7.0%	5.6%
Swing	▲1.8%	▲3.9%	▲2.9%
	Seventh party	Eighth party
	O	D
Party	Danish People's Party	New Right
Last election	2 seats, 6.4%	0 seats, 0.7%
Seats won	1	1
Seat change	▼1	▲1
Popular vote	4,683	4,064
Percentage	4.1.4%	3.6%
Swing	▼2.3%	▲2.9%
Mayor before election
Thomas Kastrup-Larsen
Social Democrats
Mayor after election
Thomas Kastrup-Larsen
Social Democrats

On 16 November 2021, an election were held to decide the 31 candidates who would be members of the Aalborg Municipal council from 1 January 2022 to 31 December 2025. Since the 2007 municipal reform, Social Democrats had had an elected mayor of Aalborg Municipality. In the previous election, they won 17 seats, which was an absolute majority. But the Social Democrats lost 11.8% of their vote for this election, and lost 5 seats, while 3 other parties from the traditional Red Bloc saw an increase in their vote share. This was a trend, that was seen in the 4 largest municipalities of Denmark. It was later announced that Thomas Kastrup-Larsen would continue as mayor for a third term.

== Electoral system ==
For elections to Danish municipalities, a number varying from 9 to 31 are chosen to be elected to the municipal council. The seats are then allocated using the D'Hondt method and a closed list proportional representation. Aalborg Municipality had 31 seats in 2021

Unlike in Danish General Elections, in elections to municipal councils, electoral alliances are allowed.

== Electoral alliances ==
=== Electoral Alliance 1 ===
Party		Political alignment
C	Conservatives	Centre-right
I	Liberal Alliance	Centre-right to Right-wing
K	Christian Democrats	Centre to Centre-right

=== Electoral Alliance 2 ===
Party		Political alignment
L	Danmarks Vision	Local politics
O	Danish People's Party	Right-wing to Far-right

=== Electoral Alliance 3 ===
Party		Political alignment
B	Social Liberals	Centre to Centre-left
F	Green Left	Centre-left to Left-wing
G	Vegan Party	Single-issue
R	Kommunistisk Parti	Far-Left
T	Trafikalt Folkeparti	Local politics
Ø	Red–Green Alliance	Left-wing to Far-Left
Å	The Alternative	Centre-left to Left-wing

=== Electoral Alliance 4 ===
Party		Political alignment
D	New Right	Right-wing to Far-right
V	Venstre	Centre-right

== Results by polling station ==
Polling Station	A	B	C	D	F	G	I	K	O	V	Ø	Å	Others
Polling Station	%	%	%	%	%	%	%	%	%	%	%	%	%
Gl. Lindholm Skole, Kulturhus	42.6	6.9	8.1	3.8	7.3	0.4	2.2	0.6	3.5	11.1	11.0	0.4	2.0
PFA Kollegiet i Nørresundby	34.7	8.9	11.5	3.2	5.8	0.2	2.5	0.5	3.7	16.8	10.1	0.4	1.7
Løvvanghallen	47.6	3.7	9.2	4.5	5.5	0.3	1.8	0.7	5.8	11.4	7.8	0.2	1.5
Multihallen Ved Vadumhallen	55.6	2.6	8.9	4.0	2.8	0.2	1.7	1.6	4.5	14.2	3.2	0.0	0.7
Sulsted Skolehal	36.4	3.9	12.8	5.2	3.5	0.2	2.4	1.6	5.6	23.2	4.4	0.1	0.6
HF&VUC Nord, Godsbanen	28.2	11.2	12.0	1.9	7.5	0.3	4.1	0.4	1.7	19.2	12.3	0.4	0.8
Vesterkærets Skole	33.2	8.3	7.2	2.6	8.5	0.4	2.4	0.6	2.4	12.1	19.2	0.6	2.6
Haraldslund	27.2	12.0	11.0	2.1	7.4	0.4	3.5	0.3	1.7	17.6	15.2	0.5	1.3
Aalborghallen	25.7	11.3	14.8	2.1	7.2	0.3	4.6	0.4	1.7	17.0	12.9	0.5	1.6
Skipperens Idrætshus	39.2	8.3	12.1	2.8	7.5	0.3	1.6	0.8	3.3	13.0	9.8	0.3	1.0
Hallen Ved Skalborggård	41.1	6.4	12.8	4.7	4.5	0.1	1.4	0.9	4.3	15.3	6.4	0.4	1.7
Kfum - Hallen	20.9	14.8	20.3	2.4	7.6	0.1	1.9	0.4	2.1	15.8	10.9	0.3	2.5
Hasseris Gymnasium	23.7	14.3	21.0	2.1	5.2	0.2	1.9	0.7	2.7	17.8	7.6	0.2	2.7
Frejlev Skoles Idrætshal	46.2	4.5	10.4	5.1	2.7	0.2	1.8	0.6	4.0	19.1	4.7	0.2	0.6
Svenstruphallen	37.9	5.5	12.7	3.8	4.6	0.2	1.4	0.4	6.6	20.2	5.7	0.2	0.8
Idrætshallen Østre Alle	37.7	8.8	11.0	2.6	5.9	0.4	3.9	0.8	2.5	16.1	8.8	0.6	0.9
Nordkraft	27.2	11.2	14.0	2.0	6.3	0.3	4.2	0.3	2.0	21.4	9.6	0.5	1.0
Gigantium	36.0	8.4	12.1	2.4	6.2	0.3	3.0	1.0	2.7	17.5	9.3	0.4	0.7
Mellervangskolens Idrætshal	43.6	4.6	8.4	4.6	6.9	0.2	1.9	1.9	7.0	10.7	8.1	0.6	1.4
Gug Skole	37.9	5.8	15.3	2.7	5.5	0.2	1.6	0.9	4.0	18.9	6.0	0.1	1.1
Tornhøjskolen, Hallen	47.8	5.4	7.6	4.2	5.0	0.4	2.1	1.4	4.3	10.4	9.7	0.5	1.3
Aalborghus Gymnasium	47.3	5.5	9.8	3.2	5.8	0.2	1.2	1.5	4.2	11.4	8.3	0.3	1.2
Vejgaardhallen	39.7	7.6	9.1	2.9	7.6	0.2	2.3	1.4	3.8	11.8	11.5	0.7	1.4
Vejgaard Østre Skole	45.4	6.2	9.8	3.5	6.6	0.2	1.5	1.0	3.8	11.6	9.2	0.2	1.1
Klaruphallen	40.4	4.4	12.1	4.4	4.5	0.1	1.8	0.6	4.5	22.2	4.4	0.0	0.7
Gistrup Skoles Idrætshal	34.3	7.5	10.9	3.8	6.7	0.2	1.0	0.6	3.1	23.0	7.4	0.1	1.6
Ferslev Skolehal	33.4	4.2	9.6	7.4	4.1	0.2	1.3	0.4	12.0	21.4	4.3	0.4	1.2
Vodskov Kultur & Idrætscenter	35.2	4.4	8.9	4.2	5.7	0.2	1.7	0.4	7.0	24.2	6.6	0.4	1.1
Vester Hassing Hallen	37.9	2.5	6.9	4.9	3.4	0.2	2.4	0.4	10.5	25.9	3.9	0.2	0.9
Hals Skole	48.4	1.8	7.0	4.7	1.7	0.1	0.9	0.3	6.1	23.4	4.7	0.1	0.8
Ulstedhallen	32.5	1.6	2.6	7.4	2.0	0.4	0.1	0.4	3.6	45.2	2.5	0.0	1.6
Nibe Hallen	34.6	5.2	7.8	3.6	3.2	0.1	1.4	0.4	3.1	37.0	3.0	0.1	0.5
Farstruphallen	30.5	5.0	7.0	9.4	3.1	0.2	0.9	0.6	5.4	31.5	5.2	0.0	1.1
Idrætscentret Kongerslev	27.9	1.3	3.8	3.1	2.1	0.0	0.4	0.0	3.6	53.8	3.1	0.3	0.7
Mou Hotel	42.4	2.4	6.9	5.3	3.2	0.1	0.9	0.7	7.0	24.4	5.5	0.1	1.2
Båndby - Hallen	37.9	3.5	7.4	3.9	4.2	0.1	1.2	0.8	4.0	31.6	4.5	0.2	0.8

== Results ==
Party		Votes	%	+/-	Seats	+/-
Aalborg Municipality
A	Social Democrats	42,149	36.88	-11.82	12	-5
V	Venstre	21,470	18.79	-3.11	6	-2
C	Conservatives	12,709	11.12	+7.13	4	+3
Ø	Red-Green Alliance	9,428	8.25	+1.88	3	+1
B	Social Liberals	8,055	7.05	+3.96	2	+1
F	Green Left	6,353	5.56	+2.87	2	+2
O	Danish People's Party	4,683	4.10	-2.32	1	-1
D	New Right	4,064	3.56	+2.86	1	+1
I	Liberal Alliance	2,478	2.17	-0.04	0	0
K	Christian Democrats	833	0.73	+0.02	0	0
T	Trafikalt Folkeparti	818	0.72	New	0	New
Å	The Alternative	364	0.32	-1.50	0	0
Æ	Freedom List	327	0.29	New	0	New
G	Vegan Party	266	0.23	New	0	New
R	Kommunistisk Parti	189	0.17	New	0	New
L	Danmarks Vision	55	0.05	New	0	New
N	aalborg DeFekt	43	0.04	New	0	New
Total		114,284	100	N/A	31	N/A
Invalid votes		294	0.16	0.0		
Blank votes		1,747	0.97	+0.19		
Turnout		116,325	64.61	-3.06		
Source: valg.dk
