= Aalborg Municipal council =

Municipal government in Denmark

Aalborg Municipal Council Aalborg byråd

Type
- Type: Municipal council

History
- Founded: 1840

Leadership
- Lasse Frimand Jensen, Social Democrats since 1 January 2022

Structure
- Seats: 31
- Political groups: Social Democrats: 12 seats Conservatives: 5 seats Venstre: 5 Seats Red–Green Alliance: 3 Seats Danish Social Liberal Party: 2 Seats Green Left: 2 Seats Denmark Democrats: 2 Seats

Elections
- Last election: 16 November 2021

Website
- https://www.aalborg.dk/politik-og-indflydelse/byraadet-og-de-politiske-udvalg/politikerne-i-byraadet

The Aalborg Municipal council (Danish: Aalborg Byråd) is the municipal government of Aalborg, Denmark.

The council consists of 31 members, and elections are held on a fixed date every four years to the council.

The Social Democrats has a history of being the largest party in the municipality, and has held the mayor's position since 1925 where they won it from the Social Liberals. For General elections and European parliament elections, the municipality is divided into Aalborg West, Aalborg East and Aalborg North.

== List of current members ==
Social Democrats (12)

Name	Role
Lasse Frimand Jensen	Mayor
Helle Frederiksen	1. Deputy mayor
Lisbeth Lauritsen	Group leader
Nuuradiin S. Hussein	Deputy mayor for Work and Welfare
Søren Kusk	Municipal council member
Henrik Hyldig Nielsen	Substitute municipal council member (Note: for Tobias Bøgeskov Eriksen until 1 December 2023)
Dennis Charles Hansen	Municipal council member
Mette Ekstrøm	Chairman of the committee for children and youth
Bjarne Jensen	Municipal council member
Evald Lange Rise	Municipal council member
Rosa Sulaiman	Municipal council member
Michael Günther Mansdotter (Note: Replaced Thomas Kastrup-Larsen on 1 August 2023)	Municipal council member

Conservatives (5)

Name	Role
Morten Thiessen	Deputy mayor for Children and Youth
Vibeke Merete Gamst	2. Deputy mayor
Lotte Finck	Municipal council member
Sofie Therese Svendsen	Municipal council member
Rikke Pedersen (Note: Elected for New Right, but turned independent in March 2023 in protest against Lars Bøje Mathiesen becoming the new party leader. In August 2023 she announced that she would join the Conservatives.)	Municipal council member

Venstre (5)

Name	Role
Jan Nymark Rose Thaysen	Deputy mayor for City and Country
Daniel Borup	Group Leader
Maja Torp Nielsen	Municipal council member
Torben Froberg Poulsen	Municipal council member
Mikael Simonsen	Municipal council member

Red-Green Alliance (3)

Name	Role
Per Clausen	Deputy mayor for Climate and Environment
Anna Aaen	Group leader
Lasse Puertas Navarro Olsen	Municipal council member

Social Liberals (2)

Name	Role
Jes Lunde	Deputy mayor for Health and Culture
Daniel Nyboe Andersen	Group leader

Green Left (2)

Name	Role
Peter Larsen	Group Leader
Jane Østergaard	Municipal council member

Denmark Democrats (2)

Name	Role
Kristoffer Hjort Storm (Note: Elected for Danish People's Party, but switched party affiliation in March 2023)	Deputy mayor for Elderly and Care
Peter Lindholt (Note: Elected for Venstre (Denmark), but switched party affiliation in August 2022)	Group Leader
