= Hjulmand =

Hjulmand is a Danish surname.

Notable people with the surname Hjulmand include:

- Kasper Hjulmand (born 1972), Danish football manager
- Morten Hjulmand (born 1999), Danish footballer
