= Sikh Federation =

Sikh Federation may refer to any of a number of organisations related to Sikhism:

- All India Sikh Students Federation, a pro-Khalistan (Sikh separatist) organisation in India
- International Sikh Youth Federation, a pro-Khalistan militant group in India
- Sehajdhari Sikh Federation, a political party in India
- Sikh Federation (UK), a pro-Khalistan organisation in the UK
