= Nuuradiin S. Hussein =

Danish-Somali politician in Aalborg Denmark

Chairman of the Board of Aalborg Havn (Port of Aalborg)
- Incumbent
- Assumed office 2026

Member of Aalborg City Council
- Incumbent
- Assumed office 1 January 2014

Alderman for Jobs and Welfare, Aalborg Municipality
- In office 1 January 2022 – 31 December 2025

Acting Alderman for Family and Employment, Aalborg Municipality
- In office 2019–2020

2nd Deputy Mayor of Aalborg
- In office 2018–2021

Group Chairman, Social Democrats, Aalborg City Council
- In office 2018–2021

Personal details
- Born: Nuuradiin Saalah Hussein; March 3, 1974 (age 52) Mogadishu, Somalia
- Party: Social Democrats (Socialdemokratiet)
- Children: 3
- Education: Aalborg University (Social Work, 2006)
- Occupation: Politician · Social Worker

Nuuradiin Saalah Hussein (born 3 March 1974 in Mogadishu, Somalia) is a Danish-Somali politician representing the Social Democrats in Aalborg Municipality. In 2014 he became the first person of non-Danish ethnic background ever elected to Aalborg Municipality. He has served as Group Chairman, 2nd Deputy Mayor, Alderman for Jobs and Welfare (2022–2025), and is currently a member of the council for the 2026–2029 term as well as Chairman of the Board of Aalborg Havn (Port of Aalborg).

== Early life and education ==
Hussein was born on 3 March 1974 in Mogadishu, Somalia. He grew up in the Somali capital, which he later described as "a well-functioning African city with theatres, cafés, restaurants and good beaches." The onset of the Somali Civil War in the early 1990s forced him and his family to flee Somalia, and he arrived in Aalborg, Denmark shortly before his 20th birthday — around 1993–94.

He has described his early years in Aalborg as a period of finding roots in a new city. He became involved in Danish-African community events, through which he met his partner, who works as a community health nurse in Aalborg schools. In 2003 Hussein enrolled in the social work programme at Aalborg University. He qualified as a social worker (socialrådgiver) in 2006, and was offered a permanent position at Jobcenter Øst (East Aalborg Job Centre) before completing his final examinations, following a successful placement and student job.

== Career before politics ==
After graduating, Hussein worked as a social worker and later as an SSP consultant (Skole, Socialforvaltning, Politi — School, Social Services, Police) at the Center for Cross-disciplinary Prevention in Aalborg. In this role he worked specifically with vulnerable young people and crime prevention in Aalborg's deprived eastern districts, including advising young people with immigrant backgrounds at risk of criminal activity.

He has noted that he chose to enter politics partly to bring these practical experiences with young people and citizens outside the labour market into the democratic decision-making process.

== Political career ==
=== First election and historic victory (2013–2014) ===
Hussein first stood as a candidate for the Social Democrats in the 2013 Aalborg municipal elections. He was elected to Aalborg City Council in November 2013 and took his seat on 1 January 2014, becoming the first person of non-Danish ethnic background ever elected to the council in Aalborg's history — a historic milestone in Danish local democracy. On his election he told Nordjyske:

"I am Danish-Somali — or I would rather say I am an Aalborg resident. It is in this city that my life has developed. The city gave me the opportunities, and I owe the city a debt."

When Hussein won his seat in 2014, he had lived in Aalborg considerably longer than his then party colleague Thomas Kastrup-Larsen had when he was first elected to the same council.

=== Second term: Group Chairman and Deputy Mayor (2017–2021) ===
Re-elected at the 2017 elections, Hussein served as Group Chairman (gruppeformand) of the Social Democrat council group in Aalborg and as 2nd Deputy Mayor of Aalborg. In 2019 and 2020, he additionally served as Acting Alderman for Family and Employment, taking on a share of the portfolio for family and social services.

=== Third term: Alderman for Jobs and Welfare (2022–2025) ===
At the 2021 elections Hussein received 2,245 personal votes — the second highest personal vote tally among all Social Democrat candidates in Aalborg, surpassed only by then-mayor Thomas Kastrup-Larsen. On the strength of this result he was appointed Alderman for Jobs and Welfare (rådmand for Job og Velfærd) from 1 January 2022, a post in which he held responsibility for approximately 43 per cent of Aalborg Municipality's total budget — in excess of eight billion Danish kroner — overseeing the municipality's entire social and employment policy portfolio.

In 2023 Hussein was discussed as a potential candidate for the Aalborg mayoral post when then-mayor Thomas Kastrup-Larsen vacated the office.

=== Fourth term: City Council member and port chairman (2026–) ===
Hussein was re-elected to Aalborg City Council at the November 2025 elections for the 2026–2029 term. Following the post-election constitutional meeting in December 2025, he was appointed Chairman of the Board of Aalborg Havn (Port of Aalborg), and serves as a member of the Jobs and Social Committee (Job- og Socialudvalget) and the Climate, Culture and Health Committee (Klima-, Kultur- og Sundhedsudvalget).

== Political positions ==
Hussein's central policy areas are social affairs, employment and community welfare. He has consistently advocated for simplifying the bureaucratic systems surrounding Danish job centres and creating more individual-centred approaches for unemployed citizens. He has described his political mission as making "Aalborg a city where safety, respect and community go hand in hand — a city where everyone has the opportunity to thrive and contribute, regardless of their life situation."

== Personal life ==
Hussein lives in the Aalborg SV district of Aalborg. He is the father of three adult children. He has spoken publicly about maintaining physical fitness alongside his demanding political workload, including spinning, running and circuit training.

== See also ==
- Somalis in Denmark
- Aalborg Municipality
- Social Democrats (Denmark)
