= Ulsted =

- Town
- location in North Jutland Region Ulsted (Denmark)
- Coordinates: 57.07550°N 10.25592°E
- Country: Denmark
- Region: North Jutland Region
- Municipality: Aalborg Municipality

Area
  - Urban: 0.7 km^{2} (0.27 sq mi)

Population (2026)
  - Urban: 969
  - Urban density: 1,400/km^{2} (3,600/sq mi)
- Time zone: UTC+1 (CET)
  - Summer (DST): UTC+2 (CEST)
- Postal code: DK-9370 Hals

Ulsted is a small town, with a population of 969 (1 January 2026), in Aalborg Municipality, North Jutland Region in Denmark. It is located 10 km south of Dronninglund, 11 km northwest of Hals, 7 km northeast of Gandrup and 25 km east of Aalborg.

== Notable people ==
Frank Jensen (born 1961 in Ulsted), a former Danish politician.
