= Nibe Municipality =

Former municipality in North Jutland, Denmark

Coordinates: 56°58′57″N 9°38′17″E

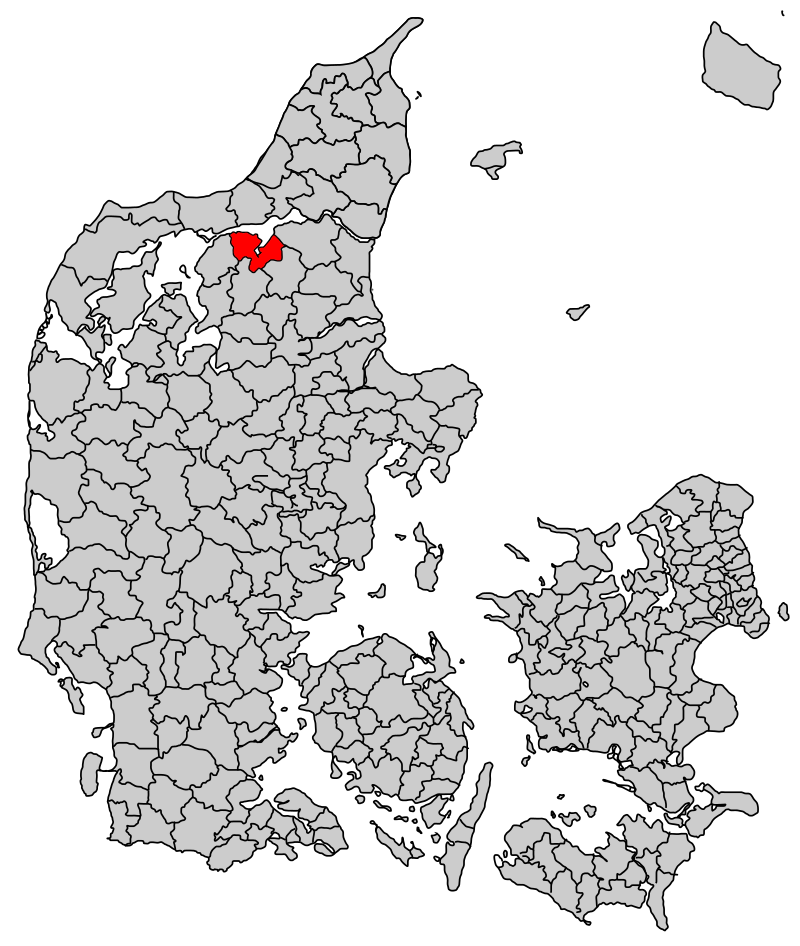
Nibe Municipality's location in Denmark, 1970–2006

Nibe Municipality (Danish: Nibe Kommune), created in 1970, ceased to exit on January 1, 2007 due to Kommunalreformen ("The Municipality Reform" of 2007). It was merged with Hals Municipality, Sejlflod Municipality and Aalborg Municipality to form the new Aalborg Municipality.

The former municipality covered an area of 185 km^{2}, and had a total population of 8,283 (2005). Its last mayor was Jens Østergaard Madsen, a member of the Venstre (Liberal Party) political party.
