= Sulsted =

- Town
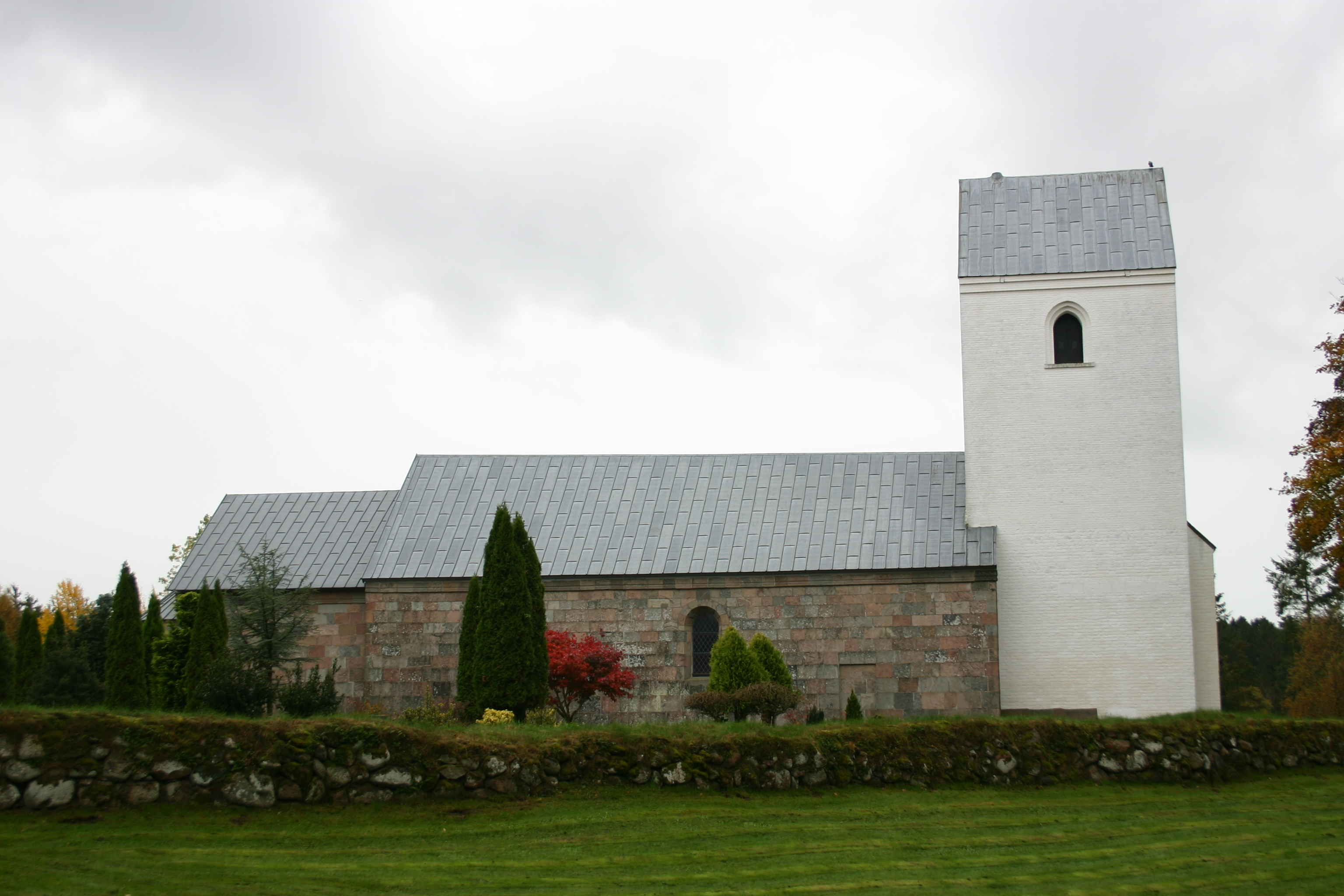
- Sulsted Church

- Location in Denmark Sulsted (North Jutland Region)
- Coordinates: 57°9′43″N 9°57′26″E
- Country: Denmark
- Region: North Jutland Region
- Municipality: Aalborg Municipality

Area
  - Urban: 1.0 km^{2} (0.39 sq mi)

Population (2026)
  - Urban: 1,461
  - Urban density: 1,500/km^{2} (3,800/sq mi)
- Time zone: UTC+1 (CET)
  - Summer (DST): UTC+2 (CEST)
- Postal code: DK-9381 Sulsted

Sulsted is a small Danish town with a population of 1,461 (1 January 2026) situated in northern Jutland, 14 km north of Aalborg and 3 km north of the closest other town Vestbjerg.

== Church ==
Sulsted Church was constructed c. 1150–1200 and features a large number of frescos, all created in 1548 by Hans Maler from Randers.

A fresco in the church.

== Notable people ==
- Knud Jespersen (1926 in Sulsted – 1977) a Danish politician, Chairman of the Communist Party of Denmark between 1958 and 1977
