= Nanika =

Nanika is an ukagaka developed by Sagawa Toyoaki, a Japanese programmer.

Nanika is composed of three parts: 'materia', which is the basic foundation of Nanika system; 'shell', which can be described as a skin; 'ghost', which is a pseudo-AI engine.

Nanika is heavily influenced by Japanese anime, such as Kanon and Ghost in the Shell.

Nanika can: check e-mail, set computer time, watch for website headlines, sing along MP3 files, use a plug-in to enhance its ability, learn words, 'talk' using pseudo-AI engine, and more.
