= Service provider =

Organization that provides services to other organizations

A service provider (SP) is an organization that provides services, such as consulting, legal, real estate, communications, storage, and processing services, to other organizations. Although a service provider can be a sub-unit of the organization that it serves, it is usually a third-party or outsourced supplier. Examples include telecommunications service providers (TSPs), application service providers (ASPs), storage service providers (SSPs), and internet service providers (ISPs). A more traditional term is service bureau.

IT professionals sometimes differentiate between service providers by categorizing them as type I, II, or III. The three service types are recognized by the IT industry although specifically defined by ITIL and the U.S. Telecommunications Act of 1996.

- Type I: internal service provider
- Type II: shared service provider
- Type III: external service provider

Type III SPs provide IT services to external customers and subsequently can be referred to as external service providers (ESPs) which range from a full IT organization/service outsource via managed services or MSPs (managed service providers) to limited product feature delivery via ASPs (application service providers).

== Types ==
- Application service provider (ASP)
- Cloud service provider (CSP) - Software, platform, infrastructure service provider in cloud computing
- Network service provider (NSP)
- Internet service provider (ISP)
- Managed service provider (MSP)
- Managed Security Service Provider (MSSP)
- Storage service provider (SSP)
- Telecommunications service provider (TSP)
- SAML service provider
- Master managed service provider (MMSP)
- Managed Internet service provider (MISP)
- Online service provider (OSP)
- Payment service provider (PSP)
- Cleaning service provider
- Gardening service provider
- Pest control service provider
- Oilfield service provider
- Application software service provider in a service-oriented architecture (ASSP)
- Cable television service provider

== See also ==
- Identity management
- Identity provider
- IP address
- SAML 2.0
- Service bureau
- Service system
- Outline of consulting
- Web service
