= Gandrup =

- Town
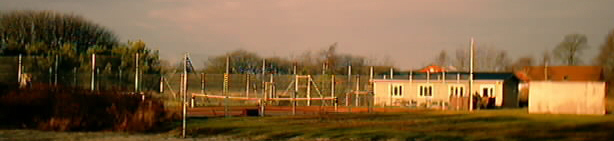
- Gandrup Tennis Club

- Location in Denmark Gandrup (North Jutland Region)
- Coordinates: 57°3′28″N 10°10′42″E
- Country: Denmark
- Region: North Denmark
- Municipality: Aalborg Municipality

Area
  - Urban: 1.3 km^{2} (0.50 sq mi)

Population (2026)
  - Urban: 1,543
  - Urban density: 1,200/km^{2} (3,100/sq mi)
- Time zone: UTC+1 (CET)
  - Summer (DST): UTC+2 (CEST)
- Postal code: DK-9362 Gandrup

Gandrup is a small Danish town in Region Nordjylland with a population of 1,543 (1 January 2026). It is located 15 km east of the centre of Aalborg, and is a part of Aalborg Municipality. (It had been the administrative centre of the former Hals Municipality up to December 31, 2006.)
