= 2021 North Denmark regional election =

2021 Danish local election

- 16 November 2021

All 41 seats to the North Denmark regional Council 21 seats needed for a majority
- Turnout: 310,538 (67.8%) ▼3.6pp
	First party	Second party	Third party
	A	V	C
Party	Social Democrats	Venstre	Conservatives
Last election	18 seats, 41.5%	11 seats, 24.5%	4 seats, 8.5%
Seats won	15	11	7
Seat change	▼3	0	▲3
Popular vote	108,637	78,337	49,069
Percentage	35.0%	25.2%	15.8%
Swing	▼6.5%	▲0.7%	▲7.3%
	Fourth party	Fifth party	Sixth party
	Ø	D	F
Party	Red–Green Alliance	New Right	Green Left
Last election	2 seats, 4.3%	0 seats, 1.0%	1 seat, 3.4%
Seats won	2	2	2
Seat change	0	▲2	▲1
Popular vote	14,370	13,233	13,073
Percentage	4.6%	4.3%	4.2%
Swing	▲0.3%	▲3.3%	▲0.8%
	Seventh party	Eighth party
	O	B
Party	Danish People's Party	Social Liberals
Last election	4 seats, 8.8%	1 seat, 3.1%
Seats won	1	1
Seat change	▼3	0
Popular vote	12,060	11,520
Percentage	3.9%	3.7%
Swing	▼4.9%	▲0.6%
Chairperson before election
Ulla Astman
Social Democrats
Chairperson after election
Mads Duedahl
Venstre

The 2021 North Denmark regional election was held on November 16, 2021, to elect the 41 members to sit in the regional council for the North Denmark Region, in the period of 2022 to 2025.

Prior to this election, and ever since the creation of the 5 Danish regions in the 2007 Municipal reform, the Social Democrats had been the largest party and held the chairperson's seat for North Denmark, and following the 2017 election, Ulla Astman had secured her third consecutive term as the chairperson . (Note: Ulla Astman was also chairperson in the second half of the first term in the region)

In this election, Astman would stand to get elected for a fourth term while Mads Duedahl from Venstre would be the main candidate for the opposition. In a result that was seen as a surprise, the parties commonly associated with the blue bloc of Danish politics had won 21 seats, and a change of control became a possibility. On the night following the election results, Mads Duedahl gave an interview announcing that he had found a majority to back him as the new chairperson.

After the result, the 2020 Danish mink cull was seen as a possible reason to the Social Democrats losing control of the regional council for the first time.

== Electoral Alliances ==
Electoral Alliance 1

Party		Political Position
B	Social Liberals	Centre to Centre-left
F	Green Left	Centre-left to Left-wing
G	Vegan Party	Centre-left to Left-wing
R	Kommunistisk Parti	Far-left
T	Trafikalt Folkeparti	Local Politics
Ø	Red–Green Alliance	Left-wing to Far-left
Å	The Alternative	Centre-left to Left-wing

Electoral Alliance 2

Party		Political Position
D	New Right	Right-wing
O	Danish People's Party	Right-wing
V	Venstre	Centre-right

Electoral Alliance 3

Party		Political Position
C	Conservatives	Centre-right
I	Liberal Alliance	Centre-right to Right-wing
K	Christian Democrats	Centre to Centre-right

== Results by constituencies and municipalities ==
This is a list of results of the following parties
A = Social Democrats
B = Social Liberals
C = Conservatives
D = New Right
F = Green Left
G = Vegan Party
I = Liberal Alliance
K = Christian Democrats
O = Danish People's Party
P = Stram Kurs
R = Kommunistisk Parti
T = Trafikalt Folkeparti
V = Venstre
Z = Progress Party
Æ = Freedom List
Ø = Red–Green Alliance
Å = The Alternative

=== Constituencies ===
Division	A	B	C	D	F	G	I	K	O	P	R	T	V	Z	Æ	Ø	Å
Division	%	%	%	%	%	%	%	%	%	%	%	%	%	%	%	%	%
North Jutland	35.0	3.7	15.8	4.3	4.2	0.2	1.1	0.9	3.9	0.1	0.1	0.2	25.2	0.1	0.2	4.6	0.3

=== Municipalities ===
Division	A	B	C	D	F	G	I	K	O	P	R	T	V	Z	Æ	Ø	Å
Division	%	%	%	%	%	%	%	%	%	%	%	%	%	%	%	%	%
Frederikshavn	44.8	1.3	16.4	5.7	2.8	0.2	0.5	1.1	4.0	0.1	0.1	0.1	19.8	0.1	0.1	2.8	0.1
Læsø	18.5	1.5	46.7	4.0	4.1	0.4	0.0	0.0	4.3	0.1	0.1	0.0	14.9	0.0	0.1	5.2	0.1
Hjørring	32.7	3.5	24.2	4.8	3.6	0.2	0.5	1.1	4.5	0.1	0.1	0.1	21.2	0.1	0.1	3.2	0.3
Brønderslev	35.7	2.3	15.4	4.5	3.3	0.5	0.9	0.8	4.4	0.0	0.1	0.1	28.6	0.1	0.2	3.0	0.2
Jammerbugt	34.3	1.6	12.0	4.9	3.0	0.2	0.5	1.0	5.1	0.1	0.1	0.1	33.9	0.1	0.2	2.4	0.5
Thisted	33.5	2.2	19.3	3.9	3.0	0.2	1.1	1.2	3.8	0.1	0.1	0.0	26.9	0.1	0.1	3.8	0.7
Morsø	33.8	2.4	11.6	2.9	1.5	0.1	0.5	0.4	2.9	0.1	0.1	0.0	40.9	0.1	0.1	2.5	0.2
Vesthimmerland	22.8	4.8	28.0	4.8	5.5	0.1	0.5	1.2	4.3	0.1	0.1	0.1	25.0	0.6	0.1	2.0	0.1
Rebild	29.6	4.4	17.9	4.9	4.7	0.2	1.0	0.6	3.4	0.1	0.1	0.1	27.9	0.1	0.2	4.4	0.2
Mariagerfjord	39.1	2.0	12.3	4.5	2.9	0.1	1.0	0.8	4.8	0.1	0.1	0.1	27.7	0.1	0.3	3.9	0.2
Aalborg	35.6	5.5	11.6	3.5	5.7	0.3	1.8	0.8	3.3	0.1	0.2	0.5	23.1	0.1	0.3	7.3	0.4

== Results ==
Party		Votes	%	+/-	Seats	+/-
North Denmark Region
A	Social Democrats	108,637	34.98	-6.48	15	-3
V	Venstre	78,337	25.23	+0.69	11	0
C	Conservatives	49,069	15.80	+7.32	7	+3
Ø	Red-Green Alliance	14,370	4.63	+0.30	2	0
D	New Right	13,233	4.26	+3.31	2	+2
F	Green Left	13,073	4.21	+0.81	2	+1
O	Danish People's Party	12,060	3.88	-4.97	1	-3
B	Social Liberals	11,520	3.71	+0.65	1	0
I	Liberal Alliance	3,474	1.12	-0.81	0	0
K	Christian Democrats	2,731	0.88	-0.05	0	0
Å	The Alternative	996	0.32	-1.19	0	0
G	Vegan Party	755	0.24	New	0	New
Æ	Freedom List	656	0.21	New	0	New
T	Trafikalt Folkeparti	643	0.21	New	0	New
Z	Progress Party	402	0.13	New	0	New
R	Kommunistisk Parti	374	0.12	New	0	New
P	Stram Kurs	208	0.07	New	0	New
Total		310,538	100	N/A	41	N/A
Invalid votes		964	0.20	+0.02		
Blank votes		11,606	2.43	-0.53		
Turnout		323,108	67.78	-3.28		
Source: valg.dk
