= Per Gade =

Danish footballer

Personal information
- Date of birth: 24 August 1977 (age 49)
- Place of birth: Nibe, Denmark
- Height: 1.88 m (6 ft 2 in)
- Position: Defender

Youth career
- 1982–1999: Nibe Boldklub

Senior career*
Years	Team	Apps	(Gls)
1999–2000	AaB	2	(0)
2000–2004	FC Nordjylland		
2004–2008	AC Horsens	126	(2)
2008–2009	Blokhus FC		
- * Club domestic league appearances and goals

Per Gade (born 24 August 1977) is a Danish former football player, who played as a defender. His preferred field position is as a right defender. He started his career with youth football in Nibe Boldklub, before he joined the Superliga team Aalborg BK, but never broke into the first team due to injuries. He moved to lower-league team FC Nordjylland in 2000, and when the club went bankrupt, he joined AC Horsens in the summer of 2004.

== Honours ==
- Danish Cup:
  - Runner-up: 1999–2000 (with AaB)
- Danish 1st Division:
  - Runner-up: 2004–05 (with Horsens)
- Danish 2nd Division:
  - Winner: 2002–03 (with Nordjylland)
