= Sulsted Church =

Coordinates: 57°8′52.62″N 9°59′22.7″E

- Sulsted Kirke
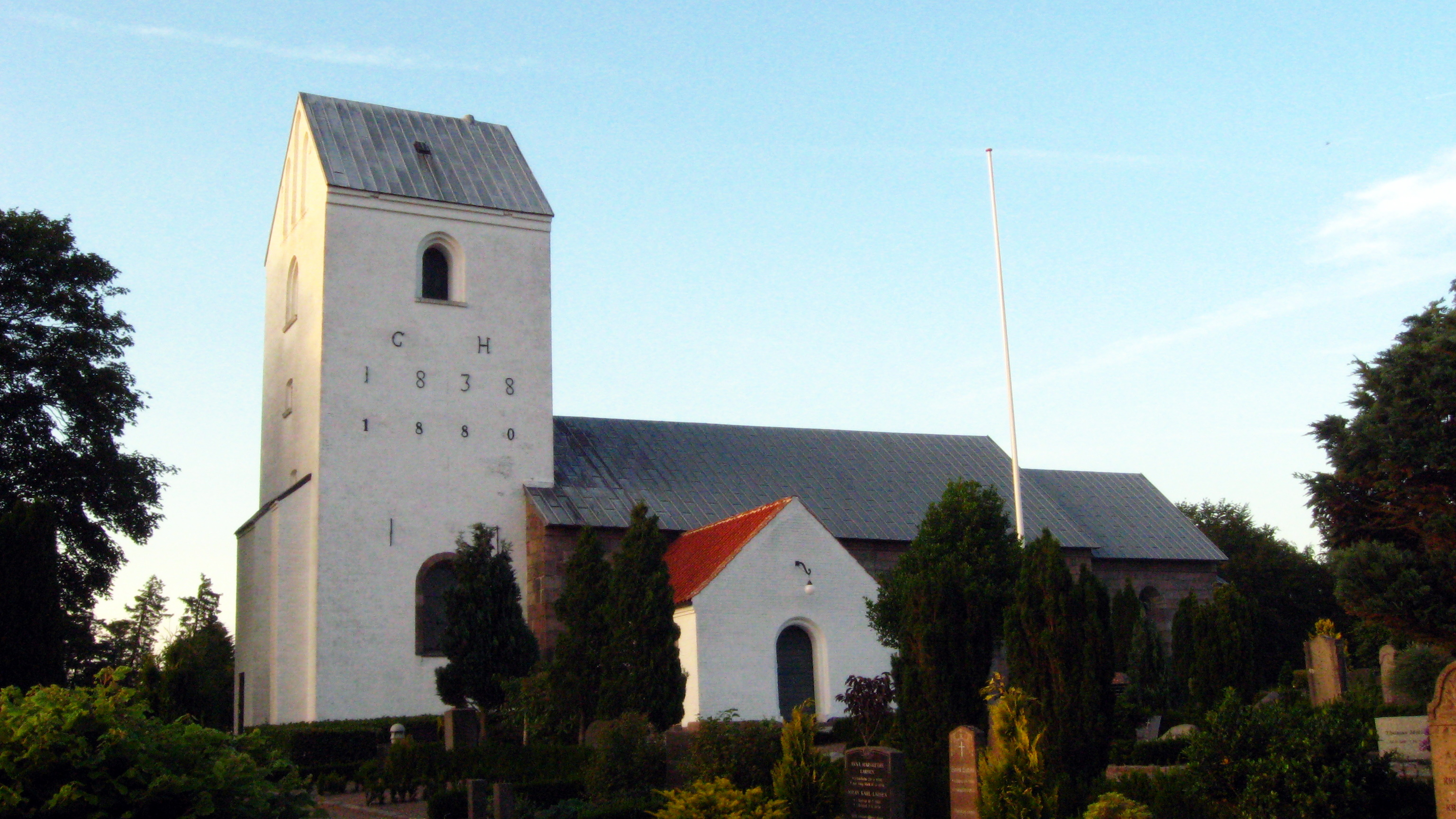
- Sulsted Church
- Location: Sulsted
- Country: Denmark
- Denomination: Church of Denmark

Architecture
- Architectural type: Romanesque architecture
- Years built: 1150–1200

Administration
- Diocese: Diocese of Aalborg
- Deanery: Aalborg Nordre Provsti
- Parish: Sulsted Sogn

Sulsted Church, located in Sulsted, a small Danish town in northern Jutland, just north of Aalborg, was constructed c. 1150–1200 and features a large number of frescos or kalkmalerier, all created in 1548 by Hans Maler from Randers.

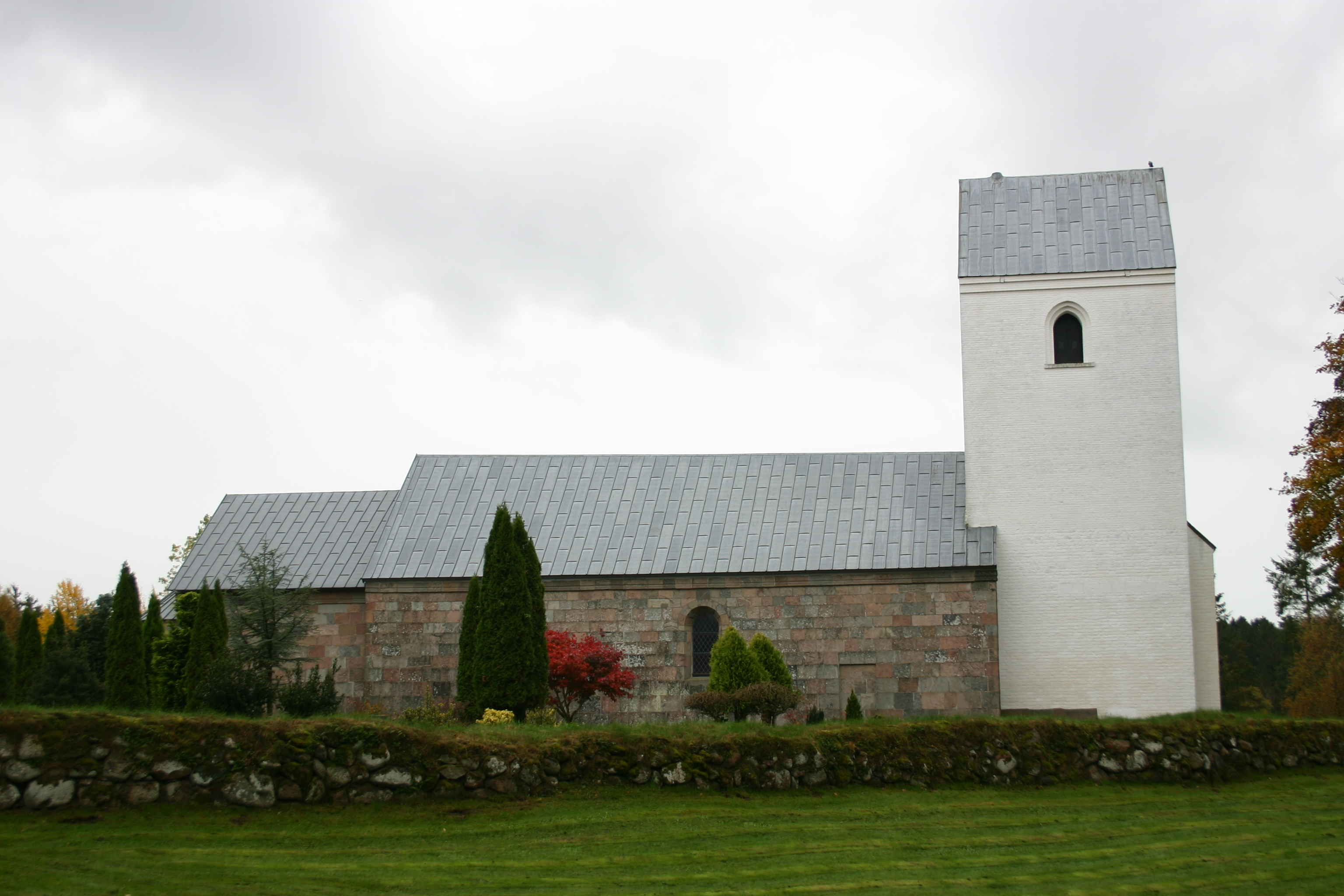

== Frescos ==
A fresco in the church

Unlike other frescos in Danish churches, Sulsted's murals were not concealed with limewash after the Reformation and have survived to this day.

The frescos, which decorate the ceiling of the nave, depict the life of Jesus starting with his birth in the first section at the west end of the nave, continue with the beginning of his passion in the second or central section and end with his death on the cross in the third most easterly section. Those in the choir are of other New Testament images related to the creed and to the Virgin Mary.

== Sources ==
- Raakjær, Ole: Sulsted Kirke, ISBN 87-985873-1-5 / ISBN 87-985873-0-7. In Danish.
- Lillie, Eva Louise: Tradition og fornyelse : kalkmalerierne fra 1548 i Sulsted kirke, in Kirkehistoriske samlinger, 1985. In Danish.
