= Kasper Hjulmand =

Danish football manager (born 1972)

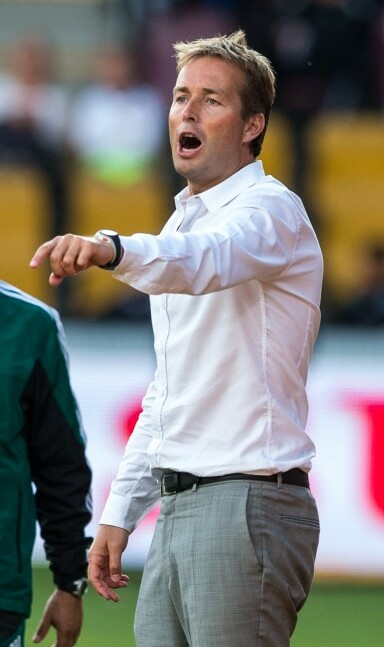
- Hjulmand managing Nordsjælland in 2013

Personal information
- Full name: Kasper Hjulmand
- Date of birth: 9 April 1972 (age 54)
- Place of birth: Gandrup, Denmark
- Height: 1.93 m (6 ft 4 in)
- Position: Defender

College career
Years	Team	Apps	(Gls)
1994	North Florida Ospreys	18	(6)

Senior career*
Years	Team	Apps	(Gls)
1987–1991	Randers Freja		
1992–1994	Herlev IF		
1995–1998	B.93		

Managerial career
- 2006–2008: Lyngby
- 2011–2014: Nordsjælland
- 2014–2015: Mainz 05
- 2016–2019: Nordsjælland
- 2020–2024: Denmark
- 2025–2026: Bayer Leverkusen
- * Club domestic league appearances and goals

Kasper Hjulmand (born 9 April 1972) is a Danish football manager and a former player, who was most recently the head coach of Bundesliga club Bayer Leverkusen.

As a manager, he led Nordsjælland to their first ever Danish Superliga title in 2012. After a brief stint at Mainz 05, he returned to Nordsjælland in 2016 before being appointed coach of Denmark in 2020, following which he guided the national team to the semi-finals of UEFA Euro 2020. He later guided Denmark to qualification for the 2022 FIFA World Cup and UEFA Euro 2024, resigning after the latter. He was next appointed as head coach of Bayer Leverkusen in September 2025, and was later fired in June 2026.

== Playing career ==
A defender, Hjulmand played with Herlev IF two seasons and then moved to B.93 in the winter of 1995. He also played for the North Florida Ospreys in 1994, scoring six goals in 18 appearances. After three seasons with B.93, Hjulmand was forced to retire as a football player at the age of 26 due to a knee injury.

== Coaching career ==
=== Early career ===
Hjulmand became head coach of Lyngby from 1 January 2006 until 7 July 2008 when he became an assistant coach with Nordsjælland. He was named the successor of Morten Wieghorst at Nordsjælland taking over from 1 July 2011 until 18 May 2014 when he had his final match as head coach of Nordsjælland; a 2–2 draw against Brøndby. Nordsjælland won their first ever Danish championship with Hjulmand as head coach, despite having one of the lowest budgets in the league. He also guided them to the UEFA Champions League group stages.

=== Mainz 05 ===
On 15 May 2014, Hjulmand was confirmed as Thomas Tuchel's successor at Mainz 05 for the following season. His first two matches in charge was in the Third qualifying round of the Europa League. In the first leg against Asteras Tripolis, Mainz won 1–0, and in the second leg, Mainz lost 3–1 and they got knocked out of the campaign. Mainz went on to be knocked out in the first round of the DFB-Pokal after losing to Chemnitzer FC in a shoot–out. In his first eight league matches, Mainz were undefeated and in third place. After this, Mainz won only one of their 13 matches and dropped down to 14th place. At this point, on 17 February 2015, he was dismissed. His final match was a 4–2 loss to Borussia Dortmund.

=== Return to Nordsjælland ===
Hjulmand returned as manager of Nordsjælland on 1 January 2016. In January 2019, he was linked with Anderlecht, but Nordsjælland wanted a compensation that Anderlecht did not want to pay, and Fred Rutten was appointed instead. Following the failed signing with Anderlecht, Hjulmand announced that he would leave Nordsjælland in summer 2019 at the end of his contract. On 25 March 2019, Hjulmand left Nordsjælland by mutual consent, after having secured a spot in the Championship round of the 2018–19 Danish Superliga.

=== Denmark national team ===
In June 2019, it was announced that Hjulmand would replace Åge Hareide as manager of the Denmark national football team, when Hareide's contract expired after the UEFA Euro 2020 tournament. The tournament was postponed due to the COVID-19 pandemic.

At Euro 2020, Hjulmand led Denmark to the semi-finals, in which they lost 2–1 after extra-time and a controversial penalty against England. He later led Denmark to finish second in their group in the 2022–23 UEFA Nations League A, finishing one point behind Croatia. In the 2022 FIFA World Cup, Denmark finished last in their group with one draw and two defeats, in which they scored only once in the tournament. In the UEFA Euro 2024, Denmark finished second in their group and faced Germany in the round of 16, but lost 2–0. On 19 July 2024, Hjulmand resigned as Danish national coach.

=== Bayer Leverkusen ===
On 8 September 2025, Hjulmand was announced as the new head coach of Bundesliga club Bayer Leverkusen, signing a two-year contract. His first match in charge was four days later on 12 September, where Leverkusen defeated Eintracht Frankfurt 3–1 in the Bundesliga. At the conclusion of the season, he was sacked by Leverkusen following a sixth-place league finish.

== Coaching record ==
As of match played 16 May 2026

Team	From	To	Record					
Team	From	To	M	W	D	L	Win%	Ref.
Lyngby	1 January 2006	7 July 2008	86	37	19	30	43.02	
Nordsjælland	1 July 2011	18 May 2014	122	58	25	39	47.54	
Mainz 05	18 May 2014	17 February 2015	24	5	11	8	20.83	
Nordsjælland	1 January 2016	25 March 2019	125	50	32	43	40.00	
Denmark (Note: Ebbe Sand was caretaker on 11 November 2020, while Hjulmand was unable to perform duties. Sand was given credit for the match result.)	1 August 2020	19 July 2024	54	32	8	14	59.26	
Bayer Leverkusen	8 September 2025	4 June 2026	48	24	12	12	50.00	
Total			459	206	107	146	44.88	

== Honours ==
Nordsjælland

- Danish Superliga: 2011–12
