= Sejlflod Municipality =

Former municipality in Denmark

Coordinates: 56°59′N 10°06′E

Sejlflod Municipality was a municipality (Danish, kommune) in the former North Jutland County on the east coast of the Jutland peninsula in northern Denmark. The municipality covered an area of 208 km^{2}, and had a total population of 9,394 (2005). Its last mayor was Kristian Schnoor, a member of the Social Democrats (Socialdemokraterne) political party. The main town and site of its municipal council was the town of Storvorde, ca. 12 kilometers east of Aalborg city center. Just south of Storvorde is the small town named Sejlflod which named the municipality. To the east is Ålborg Bay (Ålborg Bugt).

Sejlflod municipality ceased to exist due to Kommunalreformen ("The Municipality Reform" of 2007). It was merged with existing Hals, Nibe, and Aalborg municipalities to form the new Aalborg municipality, becoming part of Region Nordjylland.
