= Hals Municipality =

Former municipality in Denmark

Coordinates: 56°59′48″N 10°18′33″E

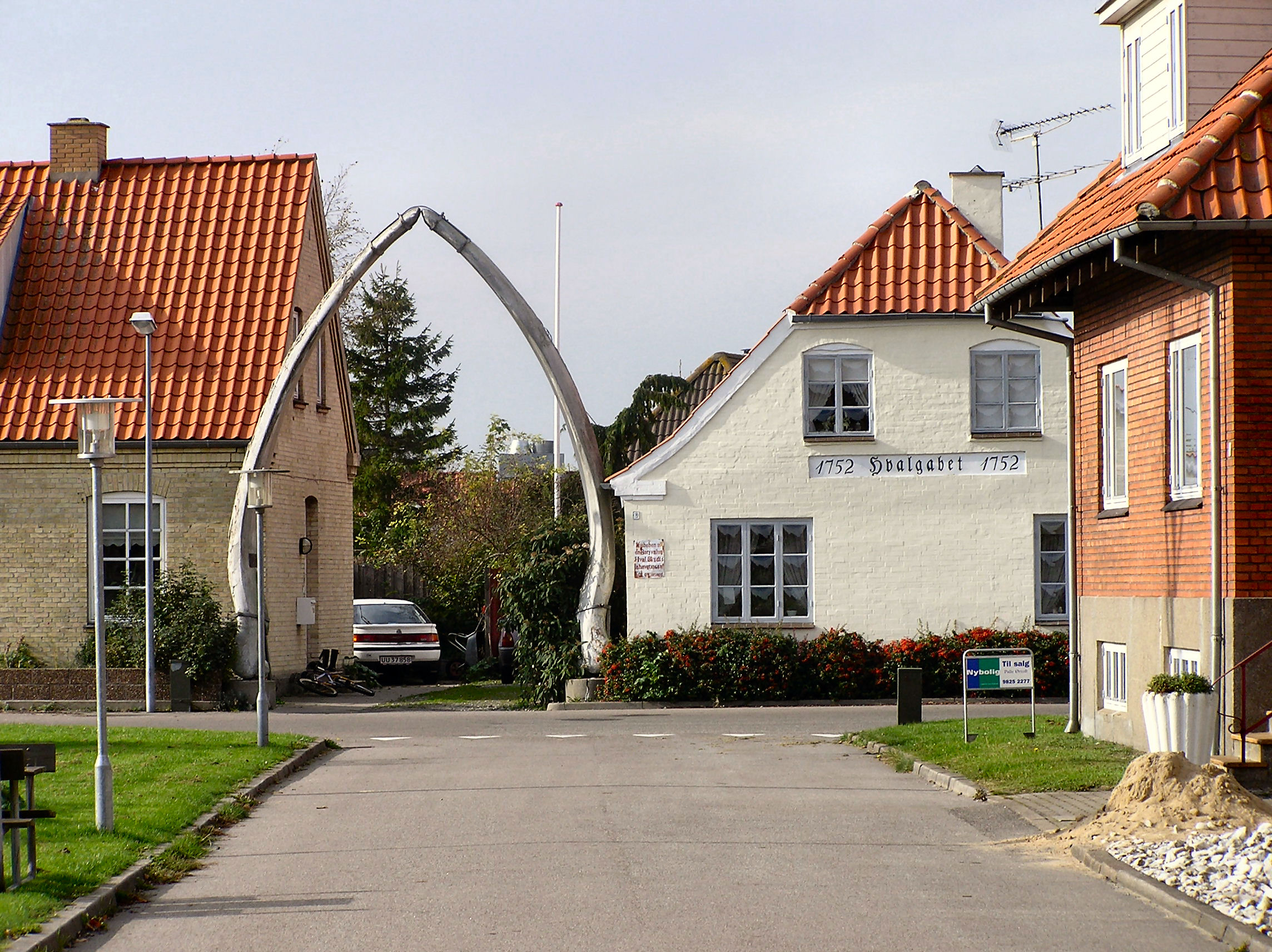
The Whale Jaws, landmark of Hals

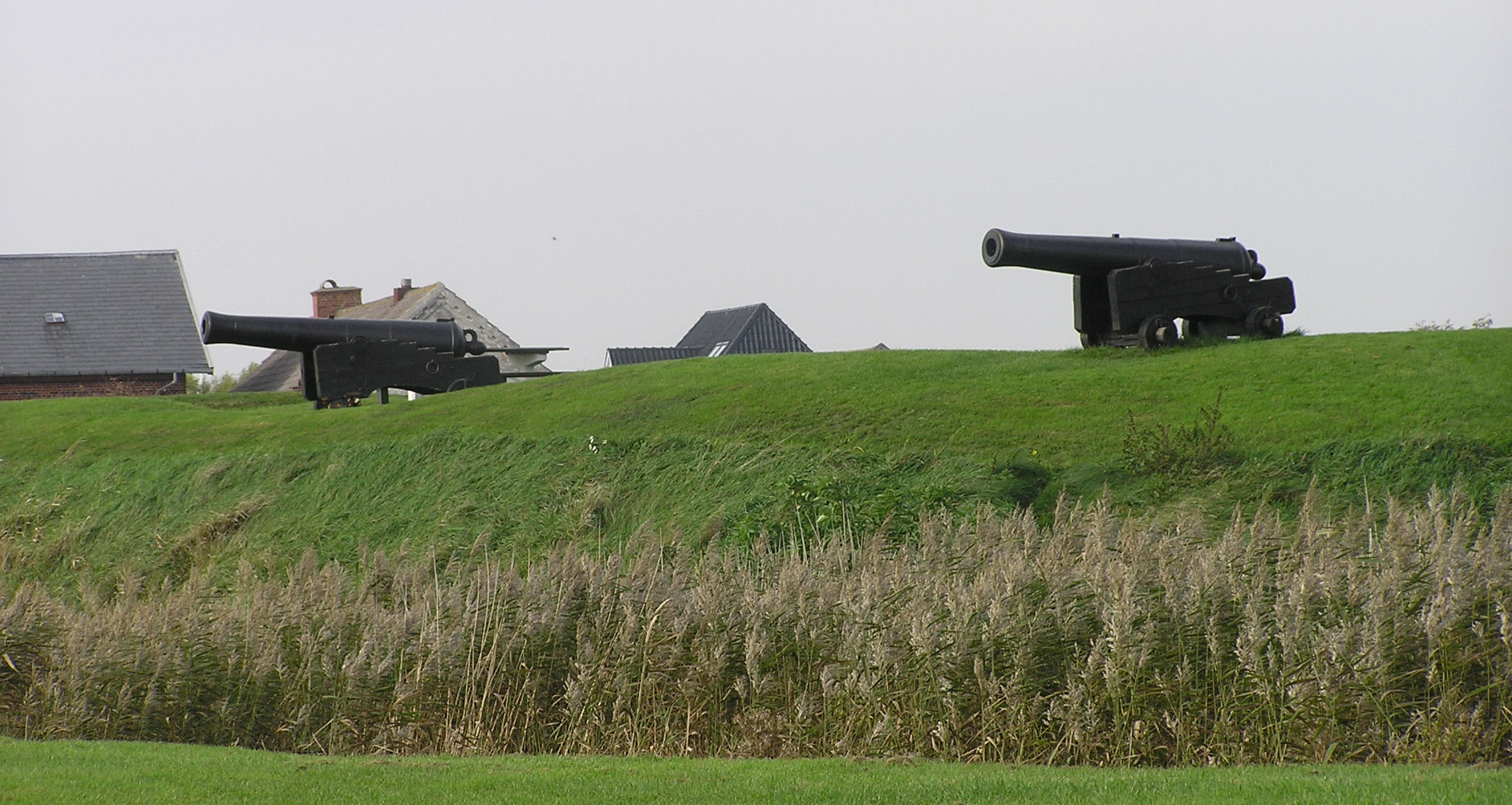
Hals Fort

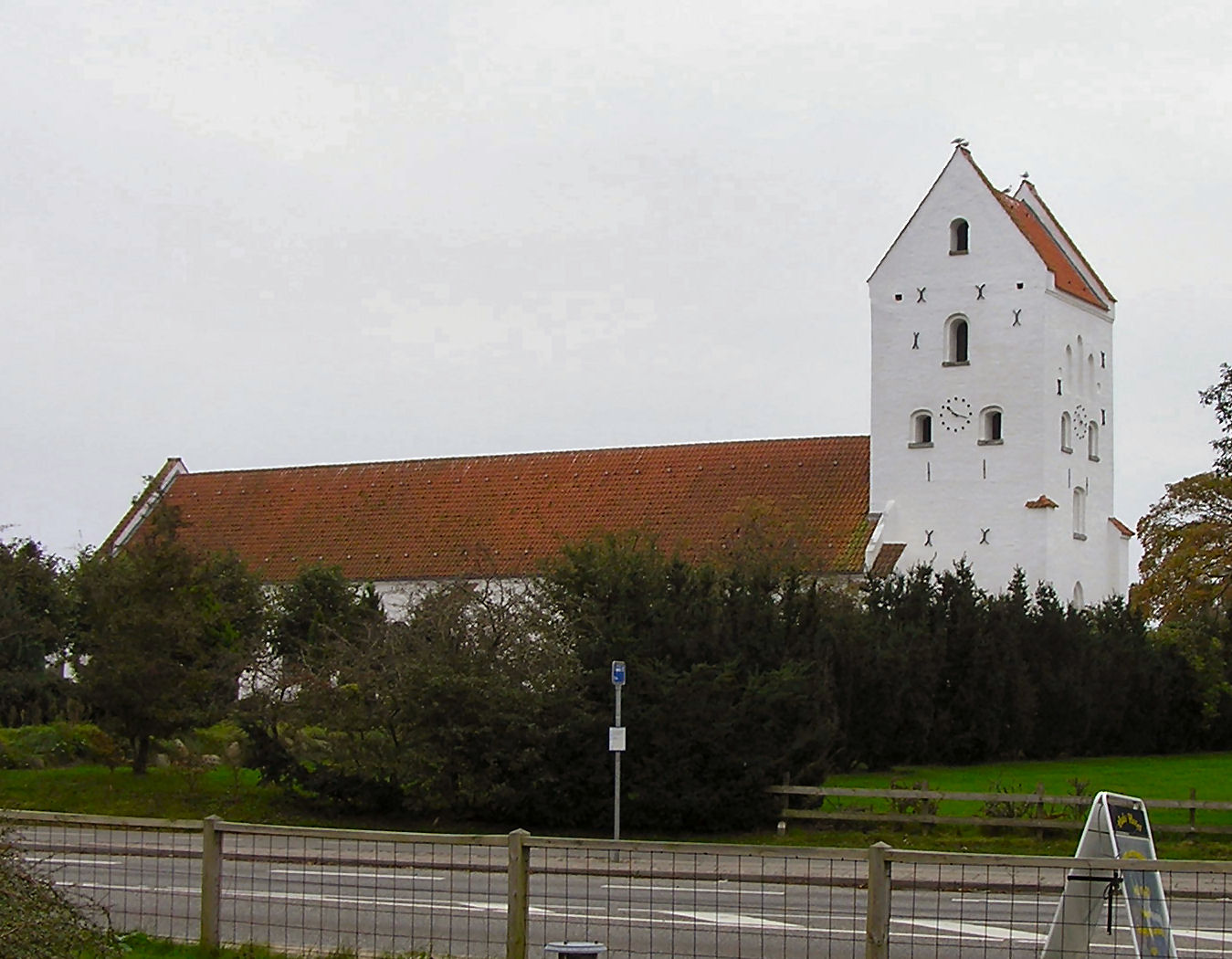
Hals Church

Hals Municipality ceased to exist on 1 January 2007, as a result of Kommunalreformen. It was located in North Jutland County. The municipality covered an area of 191 km^{2} (74 sq mi), and had a total population of 11,448 (2005). Its last mayor was Bent Sørensen, a member of the Social Democrats (Socialdemokraterne) political party. Though Hals was the biggest town, the site of its municipal council was the town of Gandrup since the location was more central. Other towns in Hals Municipality were Vester Hassing, Ulsted and Hou and some minor villages Stae, Øster Hassing, Holtet, Gåser and Ålebæk.

Hals municipality ceased to exist due to Kommunalreformen ("The Municipality Reform" of 2007). It was merged with Nibe, Sejlflod, and Aalborg municipalities to form the new Aalborg municipality. This created a municipality with an area of 1,171 km^{2} (452 sq mi) and a total population of ca. 192,353.

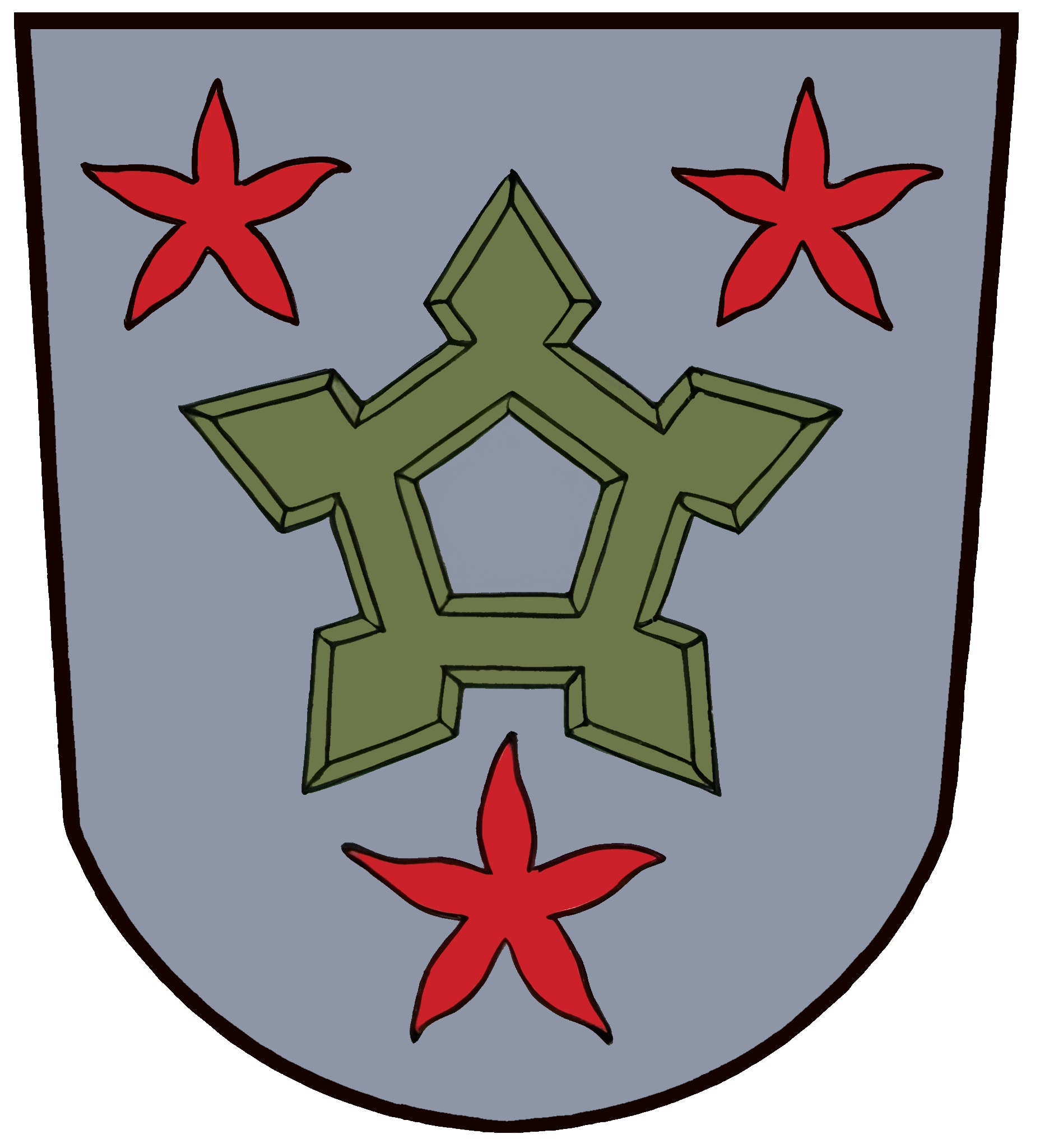
