= Hasseris =

Area of Aalborg, Denmark

Coordinates: 57°11′40″N 09°57′05″E

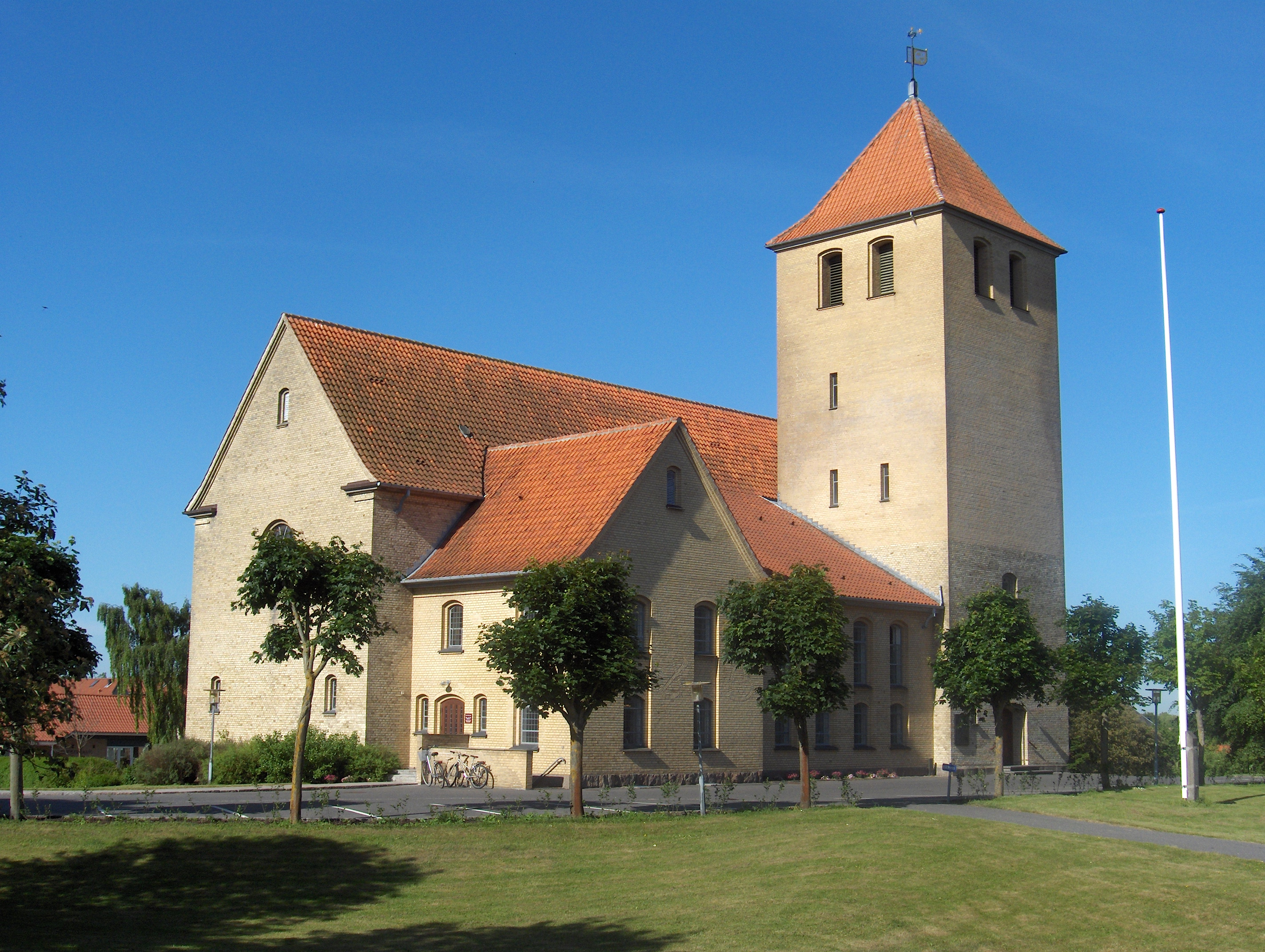
Hasseris Church

Hasseris is a district of the city of Aalborg and a former municipality in the northeast of Denmark. It is located some 3 km (1.9 mi) southwest of the city centre. As of 2016, Hasseris had 11,685 inhabitants.
