= Lasse Frimand Jensen =

Danish politician (born 1986)

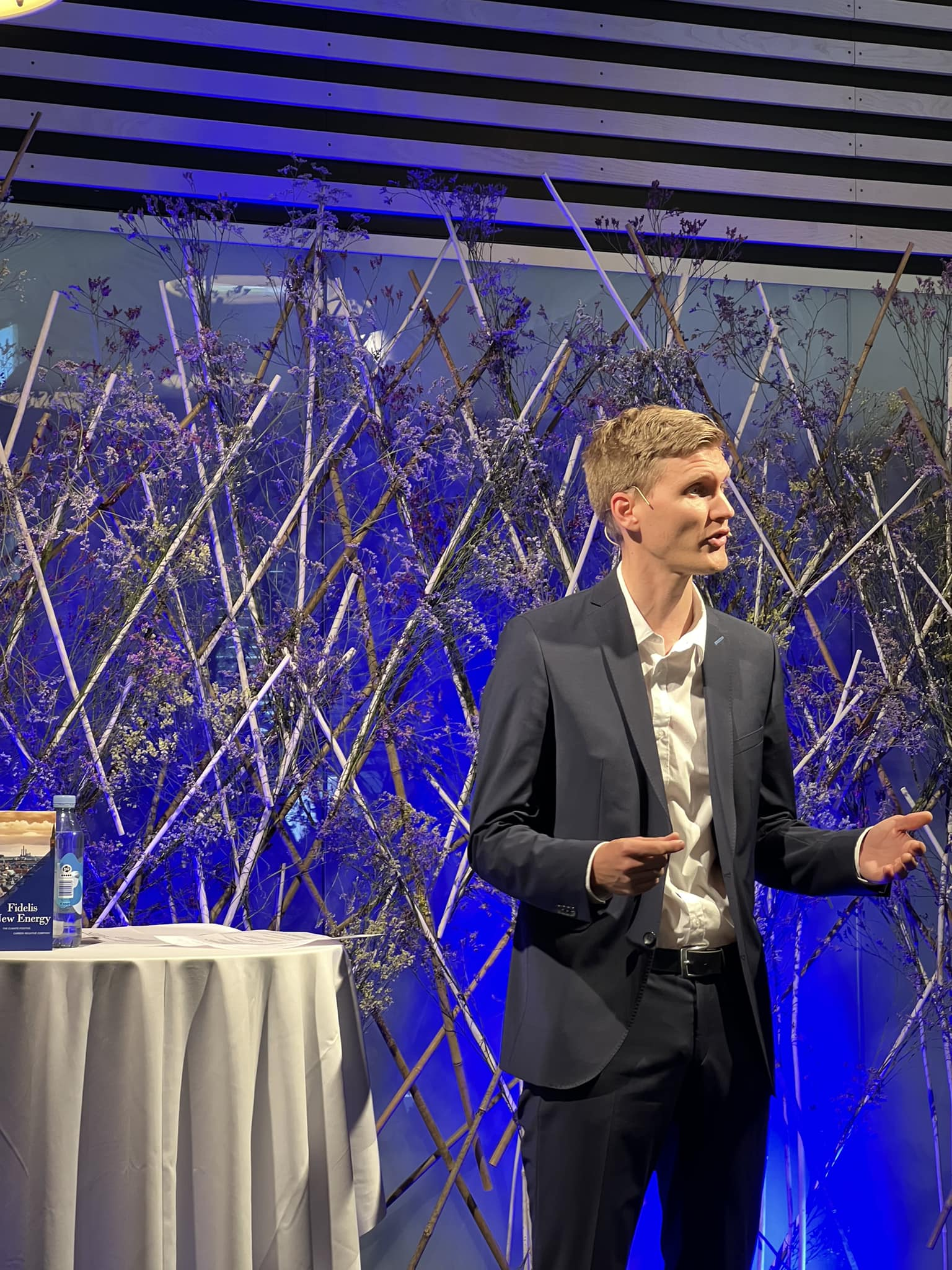
- Jensen in 2023

Mayor of Aalborg
- Incumbent
- Assumed office 19 June 2023
- Preceded by: Helle Frederiksen

Personal details
- Born: 3 March 1986 (age 40) Aalborg, Denmark
- Party: Social Democrats
- Parent: Frank Jensen (father)

Lasse Frimand Jensen (born 3 March 1986) is a Danish politician serving as mayor of Aalborg since 2023. He is the son of Frank Jensen.

== Outside politics ==
Lasse is a supporter of the football club Aalborg Boldspilklub and was formerly a member of the organized support group AaB Support Club
