= Storage service provider =

A Storage service provider (SSP) is any company that provides computer storage space and related management services. SSPs may also offer periodic backup and archiving.

Advantages of managed storage are that more space can be ordered as required. Depending upon your SSP, backups may also be managed. Faster data access can be ordered as required. Also, maintenance costs may be reduced, particularly for larger organizations who store a large or increasing volumes of data. Another advantage is that best practices are likely to be followed. Disadvantages are that the cost may be prohibitive, for small organizations or individuals who deal with smaller amounts or static volumes of data and that there's less control of data systems.

== Types of managed storage ==
Data owners normally access managed storage via a network (LAN), or through a series of networks (Internet). However, managed storage may be directly attached to a workstation or server, which is not managed by SSP.

Managed Storage generally falls into one of the following categories:

- locally managed storage
- remotely managed storage

=== Locally managed storage ===
Advantages of this type of storage include a high-speed access to data and greater control over data availability. A disadvantage is that additional space is required at a local site to store the data, as well as limitations of the on-site area.

=== Remotely managed storage ===
Advantages of this type of storage are that it may be used an off site backup, it offers global access (depending upon configuration) and adding storage will not require additional space at the local site. However, if the network providing connectivity to the remote data is interrupted, there will be data availability issues, unless distributed file systems are in use.

In cloud computing, Storage as a Service (SaaS) involves the provision of off-site storage for data and information. This approach may offer greater reliability, but at a higher cost.

== See also ==
- Application service provider
- Internet service provider
- Image hosting service
- Comparison of file hosting services
- File hosting service
