= Mads Duedahl =

Danish politician (born 1984)

Chairman of the North Jutland Region
- Incumbent
- Assumed office 1 January 2022
- Preceded by: Ulla Astman

Personal details
- Born: 14 August 1984 (age 41)
- Party: Venstre

Mads Duedahl (born 14 August 1984) is a Danish politician serving as chairman of the North Jutland Region since 2022. In 2011, he served as treasurer of Venstres Ungdom. From 2008 to 2011, he served as chairman of Venstres Ungdom in Aalborg.
