= Sehajdhari Sikh Party =

Political party

- Abbreviation: SSP
- Leader: ParamJeet Singh Ranu
- President: ParamJeet Singh Ranu
- General Secretary: Jasbir Singh Chahal
- Founder: Paramjeet Singh Ranu
- Founded: 13 April 2001 (25 years ago)
- Headquarters: 622/9, Near Telephone Exchange, Raikot, District Ludhiana, Punjab.

Website
- http://www.sehajdharisikh.in/

Sehajdhari Sikh Party (SSP), formerly known as Sehajdhari Sikh Federation (SSF), is a political party registered under section 29(A) of the Representation of the People Act 1951 by the Election Commission of India. It claims to be the world's first organization that represents the Sahajdhari Sikhs. Dr. Paramjeet Singh Ranu is the founder National President of the Party.

== Mission ==
SSP aims to spread the teachings and principles of Guru Nanak Dev and the other Sikh Gurus with the preaching of Guru Granth Sahib, to "spread the Message of Peace worldwide". It also aims to "prevent the fascist forces to divide the religion or the nation on caste basis".

== History ==
Sehajdhari Sikh Federation was formed on 13 April 2001 by holding Ardas at Gurudwara Tahliana Sahib Raekot by certain likeminded secular persons, especially those Sikhs who were born in Sikh families, when resolutions were passed by SGPC to disenfranchise the voting rights of Sehajdhari Sikhs in SGPC elections. The organization was registered under the Society Act at Ludhiana. On November 4, 2001, the federation held a large congregation of thousands of Sehajdhari Sikhs before Akal Takht at Amritsar and held Ardas by turning the Sehajdhari Sikh Federation into a political outfit, naming it Sehajdhari Shiromani Akali Dal SSAD.

Later an application was filed with the Election Commission of India to register the organization as a political party under section 29(A) of the Representation of the People Act 1951. The Akali Dals in Punjab opposed the name Sehajdhari Shiromani Akali Dal and the Election Commission directed them to change the words Shiromani and Akali, as the word Akali means Khalsa (Amritdhari) and Sehajdharis are not Khalsa. Hence, the old name was selected by the National Council of the Organisation and the Election Commission of India registered the name Sehajdhari Sikh Federation as a political party under section 29(A) of the Representation of People Act 1951. The Election Commission has approved the change of name of the party to Sehajdhari Sikh Party (SSP).

The party has held a legal battle in the Punjab and Haryana High Court for the voting rights of Sehajdhari Sikhs in the SGPC elections, which have existed since 1959 and were disenfranchised in 2003 by a notification. The High Court quashed the notification and revived the voting rights of Sehajdhari Sikhs. The SGPC filed an appeal in the Supreme Court against the High Court verdict and the matter is under adjudication.
