= Nibe =

- Town
- Seal

- Location in Denmark Nibe (North Jutland Region)
- Coordinates: 56°58′55″N 9°38′23″E
- Country: Denmark
- Region: North Denmark
- Municipality: Aalborg Municipality

Area
  - Urban: 3.1 km^{2} (1.2 sq mi)

Population (2026)
  - Urban: 5,703
  - Urban density: 1,800/km^{2} (4,800/sq mi)
  - Gender: 2,719 males and 2,984 females
- Time zone: UTC+1 (CET)
  - Summer (DST): UTC+2 (CEST)
- Postal code: DK-9240 Nibe

Nibe is a town with a population of 5,703 (1 January 2026), located in Region North Jutland on the Jutland Peninsula in northern Denmark. The town is located in a geographic region known as Himmerland. Nibe was the site of the municipal council of Nibe Municipality. The town is known for hosting an annual music festival called Nibe festival, where big musicians such as Katy Perry, Bryan Adams and Volbeat have performed.

== Notable people ==
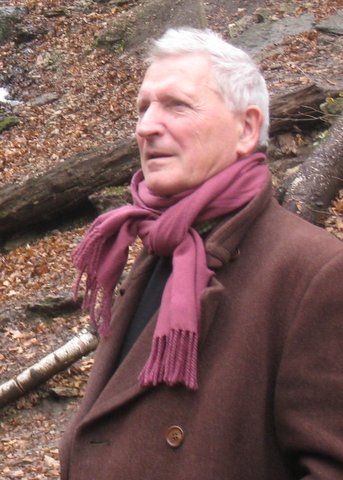
Louis Jensen, 2008

- Jens Peter Dahl-Jensen (1874 in Nibe – 1960) a Danish sculptor
- Otto Fog-Petersen (1914 in Nibe - 2003) a journalist, editor-in-chief of Berlingske Aftenavis
- Louis Jensen (born 1943 in Nibe) an author of flash fiction, metafiction, prose poetry and magical realism
- Ole Thestrup (1948–2018) a Danish actor
- Ole Henriksen (born 1951 in Nibe) a skin cosmetician and manufacturer of skin care products on Sunset Boulevard in Los Angeles, California
- Marie Askehave (born 1973 in Nibe) a Danish actress and singer

=== Sport ===
- Jørn Sørensen (born 1936 in Nibe) a retired football striker, played 31 games and scored six goals for Denmark
- Per Gade (born 1977 in Nibe) a former Danish football player, 126 club caps with AC Horsens
