= North Jutland Region =

Region of Denmark

Coordinates: 57°N 10°E

North Jutland Nordjylland (Danish) North Denmark Region
- Region
- North Jutland Region; Region Nordjylland (Danish)
- Flag

- Country: Denmark
- Capital: Aalborg
- Municipalities: 11: Aalborg; Brønderslev; Frederikshavn; Hjørring; Jammerbugt; Læsø; Mariagerfjord; Morsø; Thisted; Vesthimmerland; Rebild

Government
  - Chairman: Mads Duedahl (Venstre)

Area
  - Total: 7,933 km^{2} (3,063 sq mi)

Population (1 January 2025)
  - Total: 592,768
  - Density: 74.72/km^{2} (193.5/sq mi)

GDP
  - Total: €30.552 billion (2024)
  - Per capita: €51,608 (2024)
- Time zone: UTC+1 (CET)
  - Summer (DST): UTC+2 (CEST)
- ISO 3166 code: DK-81
- HDI (2022): 0.931 very high · 4th of 5
- Website: www.rn.dk

The North Jutland Region (Danish: Region Nordjylland), or in some official sources, the North Denmark Region, is an administrative region of Denmark established on 1 January 2007 as part of the 2007 Danish municipal reform, which abolished the traditional counties (amter) and set up five larger regions. At the same time, smaller municipalities were merged into larger units, cutting the number of municipalities from 271 before 1 January 2006, when Ærø Municipality was created, to 98. North Jutland Region has 11 municipalities. The reform diminished the power of the regional level dramatically in favor of the local level and the central government in Copenhagen.

== Geography ==
The North Jutland Region consists of the former North Jutland County combined with parts of the former Viborg County (the former municipalities of Aalestrup, Hanstholm, Morsø, Sydthy, and Thisted), and the western half of Mariager Municipality (in the former Aarhus County). It includes islands of Mors, Læsø, and North Jutlandic Island.

Geologically, the region lies in the northern part of Denmark, which is rising because of post-glacial rebound.

=== Municipalities ===
The municipalities composing the North Jutland Region.

The region is subdivided into 11 municipalities:

- Aalborg
- Brønderslev
- Frederikshavn
- Hjørring
- Jammerbugt
- Læsø
- Mariagerfjord
- Morsø
- Rebild
- Thisted
- Vesthimmerland

=== Towns ===
Main towns
#	City	Population
#	City	2022
1	Aalborg	119,862
2	Hjørring	25,644
3	Frederikshavn	22,672
4	Thisted	13,461
5	Brønderslev	12,549
6	Hobro	12,071
7	Støvring	9,089
8	Nykøbing Mors	9,033
9	Sæby	8,838
10	Aars	8,474
11	Svenstrup	7,650
12	Skagen	7,571
13	Aabybro	6,318
14	Hirtshals	5,532
15	Nibe	5,433
16	Hadsund	5,414

== Economy ==
The gross domestic product (GDP) of the region was €26.1 billion in 2018, accounting for 8.7% of Denmark's economic output and is the lowest of any region. The GDP per capita adjusted for purchasing power was €33,200 or 110% of the EU27 average in the same year.

== Transport ==
Aalborg Airport is the region's main airport, it is the third-busiest airport in Denmark behind Copenhagen Airport and Billund Airport. The airport provides direct routes to destinations in parts of Denmark, The Netherlands, Norway, Spain, and Turkey, along with seasonal flights to additional Spanish destinations, Greece and Greenland. It handed more than 1.4 million passengers a year.

== Culture and education ==
One of Denmark's five universities, Aalborg University, is situated in the region. Most of the region's museums are situated in Aalborg such as the Historical Museum of Northern Jutland, KUNSTEN Museum of Modern Art, Musikkens Hus, Utzon Center and Aalborg Zoo.

== Regional Council ==
Each of the five regions of Denmark has a regional council of 41 members. These are elected every four years, during the local elections.

Election	Party												Total seats	Elected chairman
Election	A	B	C	D'	F	I	K	O	V	Æ	Ø	...	Total seats	Elected chairman
2005	20	1	2		2		1	2	12			1	41	Orla Hav (A)
2009	17	1	4		4			3	12				41	Ulla Astman (A)
2013	16	1	3		2	1		4	12		2		41	Ulla Astman (A)
2017	18	1	4		1			4	11		2		41	Ulla Astman (A)
2021	15	1	7	2	2			1	11		2		41	Mads Duedahl (V)
2025	6	1	3		2	1		1	8	2	1		41	Mads Duedahl (V)
Data from Kmdvalg.dk
