= Aalborg Municipality =

Municipality in North Jutland, Denmark

Aalborg Municipality Aalborg Kommune (Danish)
- Municipality
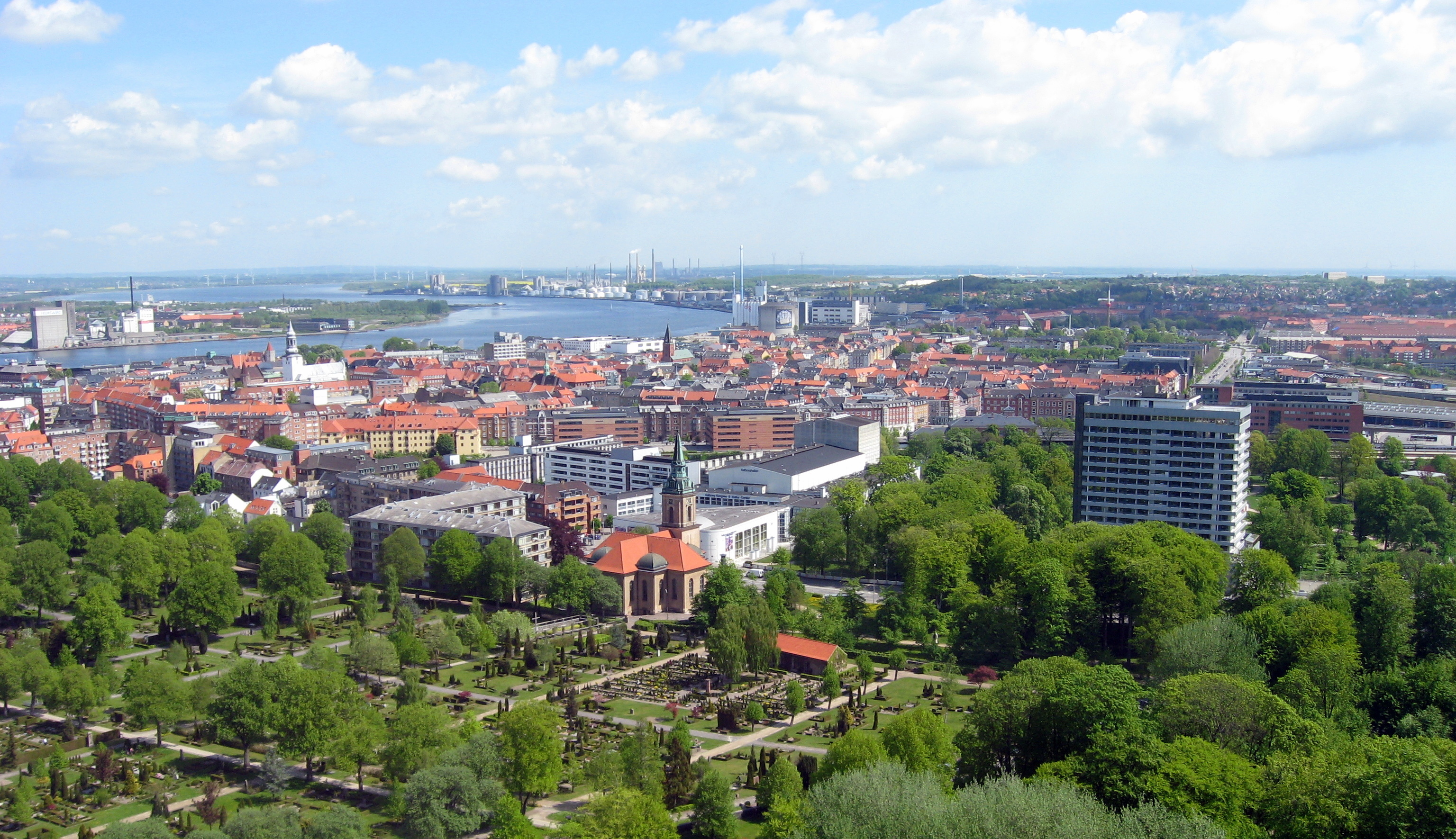

- Coat of arms

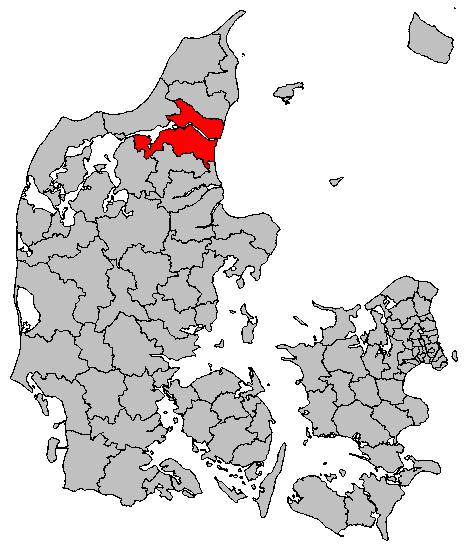
- Location of Aalborg Municipality
- Coordinates: 57°02′47″N 9°55′09″E
- Country: Denmark
- Region: Region Nordjylland
- Municipal council: 2007
- Seat: Aalborg City Hall

Government
  - Mayor: Lasse Frimand Jensen

Area
  - Total: 1,140 km^{2} (440 sq mi)

Population (1 January 2026)
  - Total: 226,033
  - Density: 198/km^{2} (514/sq mi)
- Demonym: aalborgenser
- Time zone: UTC+1 (CET)
  - Summer (DST): UTC+2 (CEST)
- Website: www.aalborg.dk

Ålborg Municipality (Danish: Ålborg Kommune) is a municipality in North Jutland Region on the Jutland peninsula in northern Denmark. The municipality straddles the Limfjord, the waterway which connects the North Sea and the Kattegat east-to-west, and which separates the main body of the Jutland peninsula from the island of Vendsyssel-Thy north-to-south. It has a land area of 1,143.99 km^{2} (441.70 sq mi) and a population of 226,033 (1 January 2026).

It is also the name of the municipality's main city Aalborg and the site of its municipal council, as well as the name of a seaport.

The municipality and the town have chosen to retain the traditional spelling of the name as Aalborg, although the new spelling Ålborg is used in other contexts, such as Ålborg Bight (Ålborg Bugt), the body of water which lies to the east of the Jutland peninsula.

== Municipal reform of 2007 ==
As of 1 January 2007 Aalborg municipality joined with the municipalities of Hals, Nibe, and Sejlflod to form a new Aalborg municipality. The former Aalborg municipality, including the island of Egholm, covered an area of 560 km^{2} (220 sq mi), with a total population of 192,353 (2005). Its last mayor was Henning G. Jensen, a member of the Social Democrats (Socialdemokraterne) political party. The former municipality was bordered by Sejlflod and Hals to the east, Dronninglund and Brønderslev to the north, Aabybro and Nibe to the west, and Støvring and Skørping to the south. It belonged to North Jutland County.

== Geography ==
=== Surroundings ===
The waters in the Limfjord splitting the municipality are called Langerak to the east and Gjøl Bredning to the west. The island of Egholm is located in Gjøl Bredning, and is connected by ferry to the city of Aalborg at its southern shore.

The area is typical for the north of Jutland. To the west, the Limfjord broadens into an irregular lake (salt water), with low, marshy shores and many islands. Northwest is Store Vildmose ("Greater Wild bog"), a swamp where a mirage is sometimes seen in summer. Southeast lies the similar Lille Vildmose ("Lesser Wild bog"). Store Vildmose was drained and farmed in the beginning of the 20th century, and Lille Vildmose is now the largest moor in Denmark.

=== Urban areas in Aalborg Municipality ===
Aalborg City has a total population of 123,432. The metropolitan area is a conurbation of the Aalborg urban area in Himmerland (102,312) and the Nørresundby urban area in Vendsyssel (21,120).

The largest urban areas in Aalborg Municipality
Nr	Urban area	Population (2011)
1	Aalborg	103,545
2	Nørresundby	21,376
3	Svenstrup	6,751
4	Nibe	4,987
5	Vodskov	4,399
6	Klarup	4,182
7	Gistrup	3,573
8	Storvorde	3,243
9	Vestbjerg	2,677
10	Frejlev	2,579

== Economy ==
North Flying has its head office on the property of Aalborg Airport in Nørresundby, Aalborg Municipality.

== Politics ==
=== Municipal council ===
Aalborg's municipal council consists of 31 members, elected every four years.

Below are the municipal councils elected since the Municipal Reform of 2007.

Election	Party								Total seats	Turnout	Elected mayor
Election	A	B	C	F	I	O	V	Ø	Total seats	Turnout	Elected mayor
2005	15	2	3	2		1	8		31	64.6%	Henning G. Jensen (A)
2009	12	1	2	5		2	9		31	60.3%	Henning G. Jensen (A)
2013	12	2	1	1	1	2	9	3	31	68.4%	Thomas Kastrup-Larsen (A)
2017	17	1	1			2	8	2	31	67.7%	Thomas Kastrup-Larsen (A)

== Twin towns – sister cities ==
Aalborg is twinned with 34 cities, more than any other city in Denmark. Every four years, Aalborg gathers young people from most of its twin towns for a week of sports, known as Ungdomslegene (Youth Games).

- Almere, Netherlands
- Antibes, France
- Büdelsdorf, Germany
- Edinburgh, Scotland, United Kingdom
- Fredrikstad, Norway
- Fuglafjørður, Faroe Islands
- (Republic of Ireland) Galway, Ireland
- Gdynia, Poland
- Haifa, Israel
- Hefei, China
- Innsbruck, Austria
- Ittoqqortoormiit, Greenland
- Karlskoga, Sweden
- Lancaster, England
- Lerum, Sweden
- Liperi, Finland
- Norðurþing, Iceland
- Orsa, Sweden
- Orust, Sweden
- Ośno Lubuskie, Poland
- Pushkin, Russia
- Racine, United States
- Rapperswil-Jona, Switzerland
- Rendalen, Norway
- Rendsburg, Germany
- Riga, Latvia
- Riihimäki, Finland
- Sermersooq, Greenland
- Solvang, United States
- Tulcea, Romania
- Varna, Bulgaria
- Vilnius, Lithuania
- Wismar, Germany
