= Weilerstein =

Weilerstein is a surname. Notable people with the surname include:

- Alisa Weilerstein (born 1982), American classical cellist
- Joshua Weilerstein (born 1987), American conductor and violinist
- Donald Weilerstein (born 1940), American violinist and pedagogue
- Sadie Rose Weilerstein (1894–1993), American children's writer
