= Erling Møldrup =

Danish musician (1943–2016)

Erling Møldrup (1943 - 2016) was a Danish classical guitarist best known for championing Danish guitar music from all periods.

Born in Aarhus, Møldrup grew up as an only child in Nørregade, in the inner city, in a music loving workers family. He started apprenticeship as a mason, like his father, but soon fell in love with the guitar. At the age of 15 he started to take classes at the Aarhus Folk Music School where he heard classical guitar music for the first time and his talent was spotted by the teachers.

Later on, at the Danish Royal Academy of Music in Aarhus, Møldrup received his initial training under Jytte Gorki Schmidt, obtaining his academy diploma in 1972. He has performed around the world as a soloist, chamber musician and with various orchestras. He has also toured as a guest lecturer. The first of many recordings by him appeared in 1975; among them are J. S. Bach's lute works and the complete guitar works of Per Nørgård. He played repertoire from all periods — Renaissance, Baroque, Classical, 'Segovia-style' and modern — and he commissioned a large number of works from living Scandinavian composers (see below). Møldrup also authored the book "Guitaren, et eksotisk instrument i den danske musik" (The Guitar, an exotic instrument in Danish music) and a number of articles.

== Composers who have written works for Erling Møldrup ==
- Erik Bach
- Axel Borup-Jørgensen
- Ole Buck
- John Frandsen
- Ivar Frounberg
- Hans Gefors
- Pelle Gudmundsen-Holmgreen
- Svend Nielsen
- Tage Nielsen
- Per Nørgård
- Ib Nørholm
- Karl Aage Rasmussen
- Poul Ruders
- Flemming Weis
- Timme Ørvad

== Recordings ==
- Music for Flute and Guitar from the Danish Golden Age with Karl Lewkovitch, flute (Olga 1989)
- Estrellita: Spanish, French and Latin American Guitar Music (Olga 1990)
- The Frosty Silence...: Guitar Works by 6 Contemporary Danish Composers (Da Capo 1993)
- In Memory of...: Guitar Works by Per Nørgård (Kontrapunkt 1996)
- J. S. Bach: The Complete Lute/Guitar Works (Classico 1997)
- The Danish Classical Guitar (Kontrapunkt 1997)
- Ricordanza: Music for Cello and Guitar by Romantic Composers (Classico 1999)
- Jeanne D'arc: Musik for Carl Th. Dreyer's Silent Movie-Master Work "Jeanne D'Arc" (for soprano, guitar and orchestra) (Da Capo 1998-99)
- Early Morn: Guitar Works by 6 Danish Composers (Danacord 2002)
- El Delirio: Romantic Guitar Music (Classico, 2003)
- Album Leaves: 50 Pieces for Guitar by Henrik and Frederik Rung (Classico 2003)
- On the Track: Guitar Master Works by Seven Non-Guitarist Composers (with Thomas Jensen, flute) (Classico 2005)
- Per Nørgård: Tales from a Hand (4 suites for guitar) (Classico 2009)
- Bellmaniana (CDKlassisk 2010)
