= Mariager =

- Town
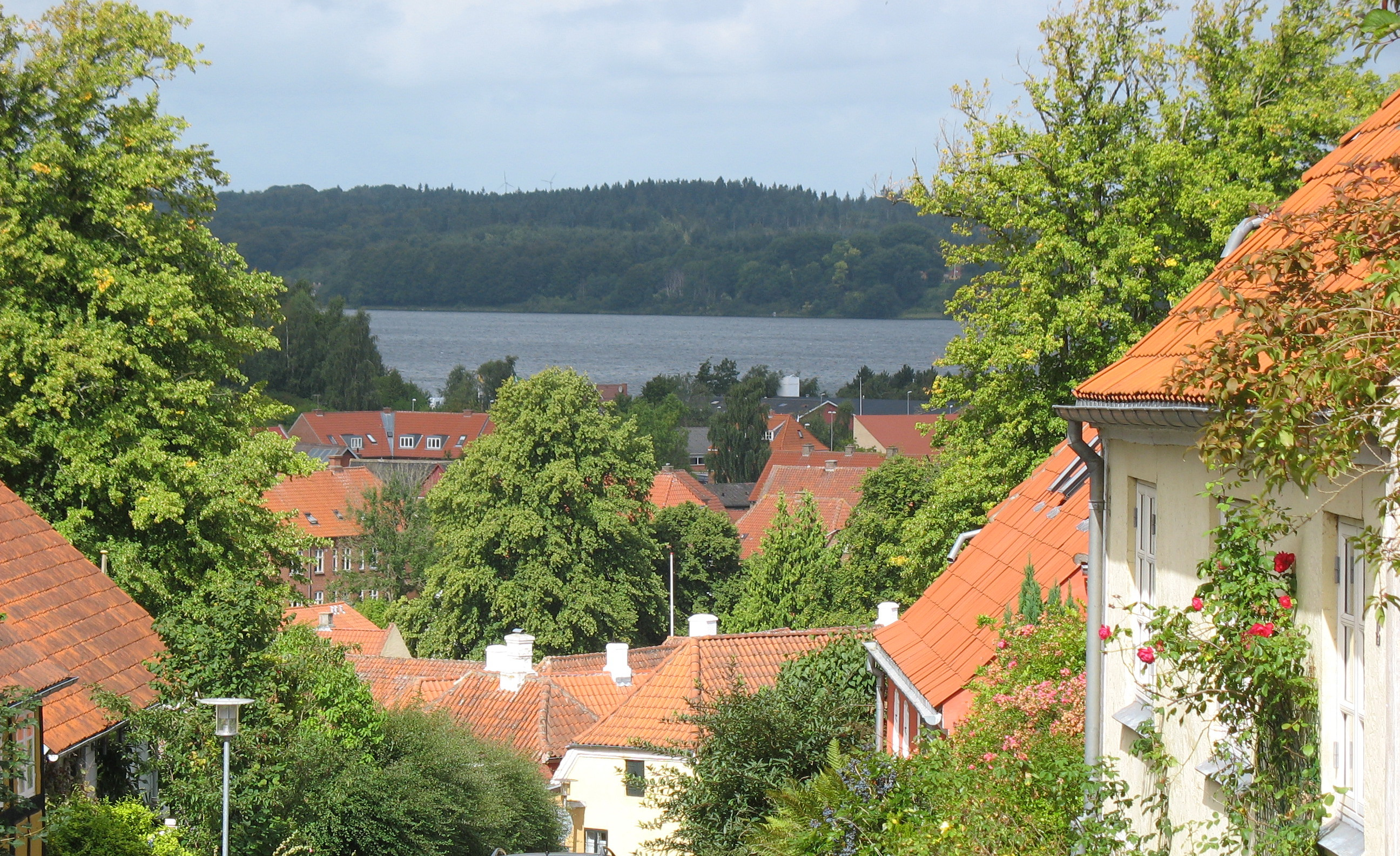
- Mariager, looking towards the fjord

- Coat of arms
- Nickname: Rosernes By (Town of Roses)
- Location in Denmark Mariager (North Jutland Region)
- Coordinates: 56°39′N 10°00′E
- Country: Denmark
- Region: North Denmark Region
- Municipality: Mariagerfjord

Area
  - Urban: 1.9 km^{2} (0.73 sq mi)

Population (1 January 2026)
  - Urban: 2,651
  - Urban density: 1,400/km^{2} (3,600/sq mi)
- Time zone: UTC+1 (CET)
  - Summer (DST): UTC+1 (CEST)
- Area code: (+45)
- Website: mariager.dk

Mariager (Danish pronunciation: [ˈmɑːiˌeˀɐ]) is a town in Denmark with a population of 2,651 (1 January 2026). It is on the south shore of Mariager Fjord, and is in Mariagerfjord municipality in the North Denmark region. An area of north-east Jutland that includes this municipality is also known as Kronjylland (Crown Jutland).

== Etymology ==
Mariager is mentioned in 1446 as Marieager, a compound of the name Marie (the Virgin Mary) and the Danish root ager ('cultivated land'). It can therefore be inferred to mean 'a place dedicated to the cultivation of the Virgin Mary'. It was originally the name of Mariager Abbey.

== Notable people ==
- Mariane Bournonville (1768 in Mariager – 1797) a ballerina, active at the Royal Danish Ballet in 1784-1796
- Vilhelm Dahlerup (1836 in Mariager – 1907) architect who specialized in the Historicist style
- Budtz Müller (1837 in Mariager – 1884) a pioneering Danish photographer
- Philip Smidth (1855 in Mariager – 1938) a prolific architect in the Historicist style
- Peter Nansen (1861–1918 in Mariager) novelist, journalist, and publisher
- Aksel Nielsen (1901 in Mariager – 1984) a Danish-American philanthropist, emigrated 1910
- Erik Bach (born 1946 in Mariager), classical composer and former principal of Royal Academy of Music in Aarhus
- Emmelie de Forest (born 1993), singer and songwriter, brought up in Mariager

=== Sport ===
- Thomas Andie (born 1972 in Mariager), former professional footballer, over 200 club caps
- Kim Christensen (born 1984 in Mariager) athlete, competed in the shot put at the 2012 Summer Olympics
