= Musikkens Hus =

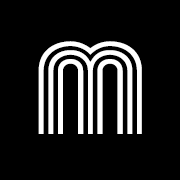

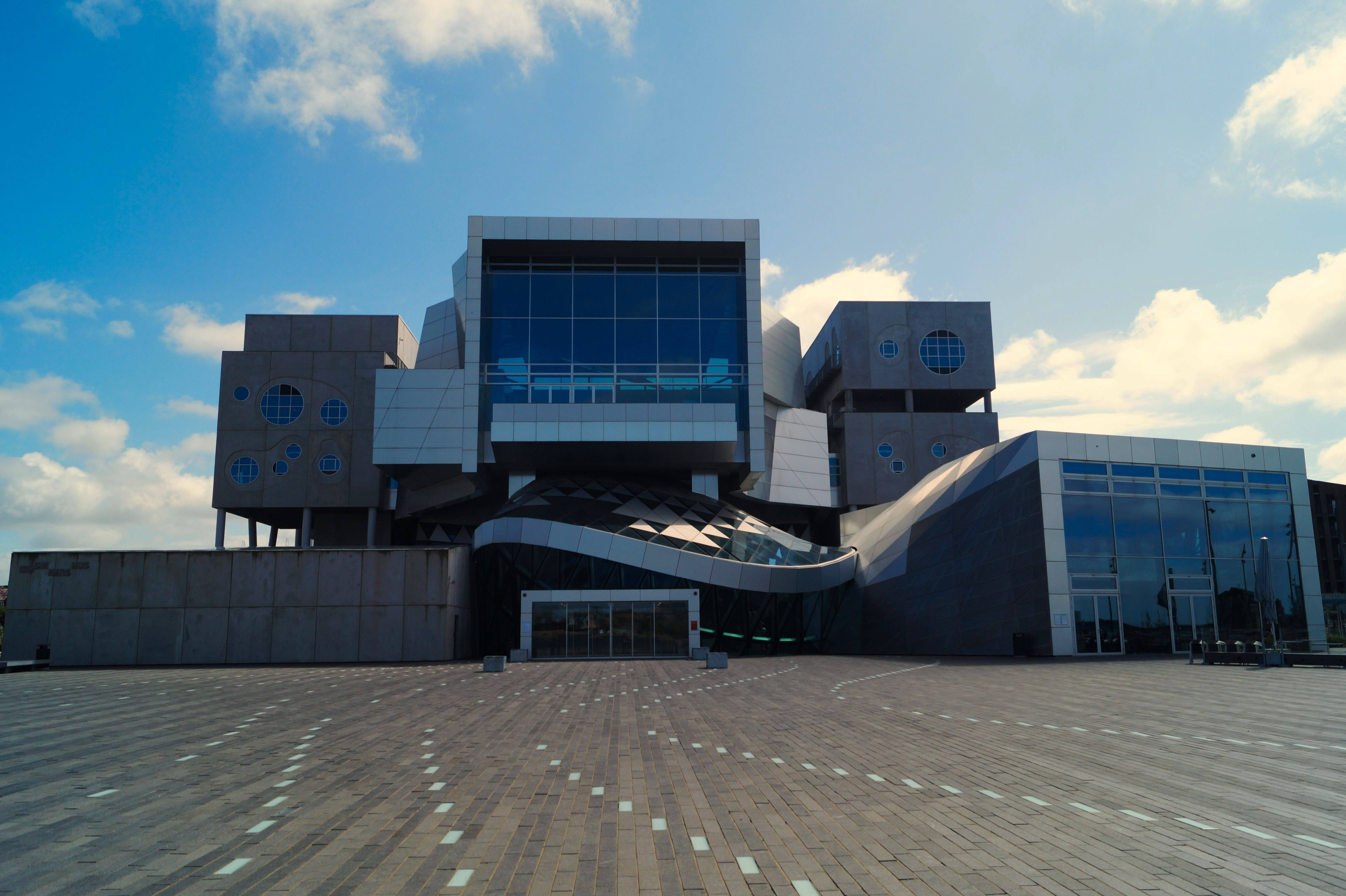

General information
- Status: Completed
- Type: Concert hall
- Architectural style: Deconstructivism
- Location: Musikkens Plads, Aalborg, Denmark
- Coordinates: 57°2′52″N 9°55′59″E
- Current tenants: Aalborg Symphony Orchestra; The Royal Academy of Music; Orkester Norden; Aalborg University; Danish JazzCenter
- Construction started: 31 May 2010
- Completed: Education: 2013; Concerts: 2014
- Opened: 28 March 2014; 12 years ago
- Cost: 704 million DKK
- Client: Foundation for Musikkens Hus in Northern Jutland
- Owner: Foundation for House of Music in Northern Jutland

Height
- Height: 30 metres (98 ft)

Technical details
- Structural system: Concrete frame

Design and construction
- Architect: Coop Himmelb(l)au

Other information
- Seating capacity: Foyer 2,150; Concert Hall 1,293; Intime Hall 300; Classic Hall 200; Rhythmic Hall 200; Total 4,143

Website
- www.musikkenshus.dk

Musikkens Hus (English: House of Music) is a venue in Aalborg, Denmark. It is located at Musikkens Plads by the Limfjord in the new cultural center area of the city. Opened in March 2014, the building contains a concert hall and practice rooms for the Aalborg Symphony Orchestra and The Royal Academy of Music. Additional tenants include Orchestra Norden, as well as two of Aalborg University's fine arts divisions, Institute of Music and Danish JazzCenter.

The building features a solar-passive design and faces the riverfront. The educational rooms are constructed in a U shape around the central concert hall.

== History ==
After an international architecture competition, Coop Himmelb(l)au was selected to design the structure. Construction began in July 2010. The administrative offices moved into the building in July 2013. A new-Nordic restaurant called Musikkens Spisehus (the Music's Eating House) also opened in 2013 in a section of the building with a view to Limfjord. Theatre and acoustics consulting was provided initially by Artec Consultants and later Arup.

The official opening of the concert hall took place on March 29, 2014, and was attended by Queen Margrethe II of Denmark. On 27 September 2014, Crown Prince Frederik and Crown Princess Mary of Denmark presented the Crown Prince Couple's Awards in the hall.

== Tenants ==
The foundation is today the owner of Musikkens Hus and is therefore renting the facilities out to these:

- Aalborg Symphony Orchestra has its administration, practice rooms, and concerts in the halls.
- Aalborg University has its music education and research, and their department Danish JazzCenter is also located, in Musikkens Hus.
- Orkester Norden has its administration, practice rooms, and concerts in the halls.
- Royal Academy of Music has its education department and concert facilities in the building.

== Facilities ==
Musikkens Hus contains four halls and a number of practice rooms etc.:

- The Concert Hall (or the Main Hall) seats 1,298 people
- The Minor Hall seats 300 people
- The Rhythmic Hall seats 200 people
- The Classical Hall seats 200 people
- The Foyer handles 2,150 people for receptions etc.
- Musikkens Spisehus is the restaurant of Musikkens Hus and is located out to the Limfjord in two floors

== Gallery ==
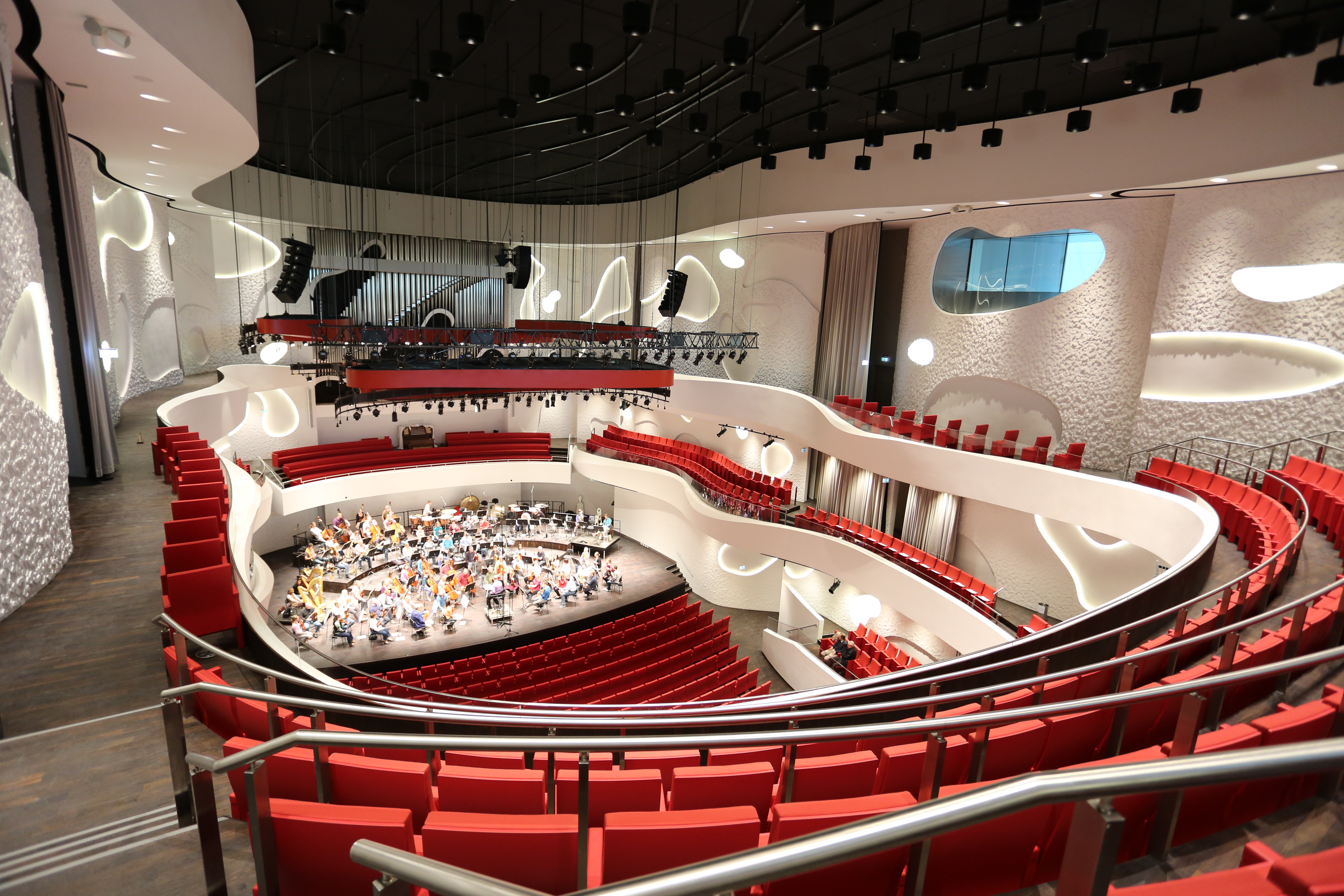
The Concert Hall

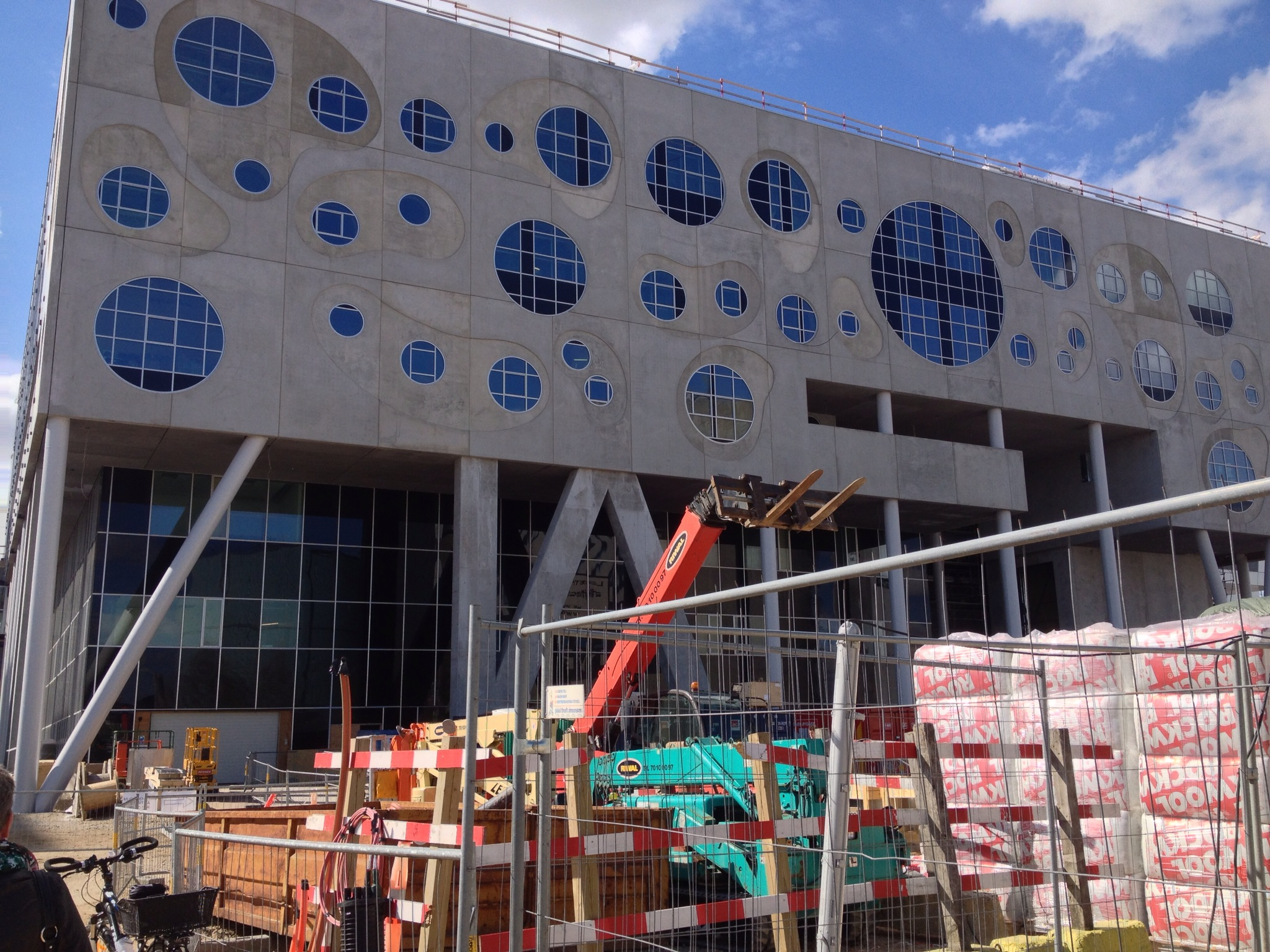
Musikkens Hus, under construction

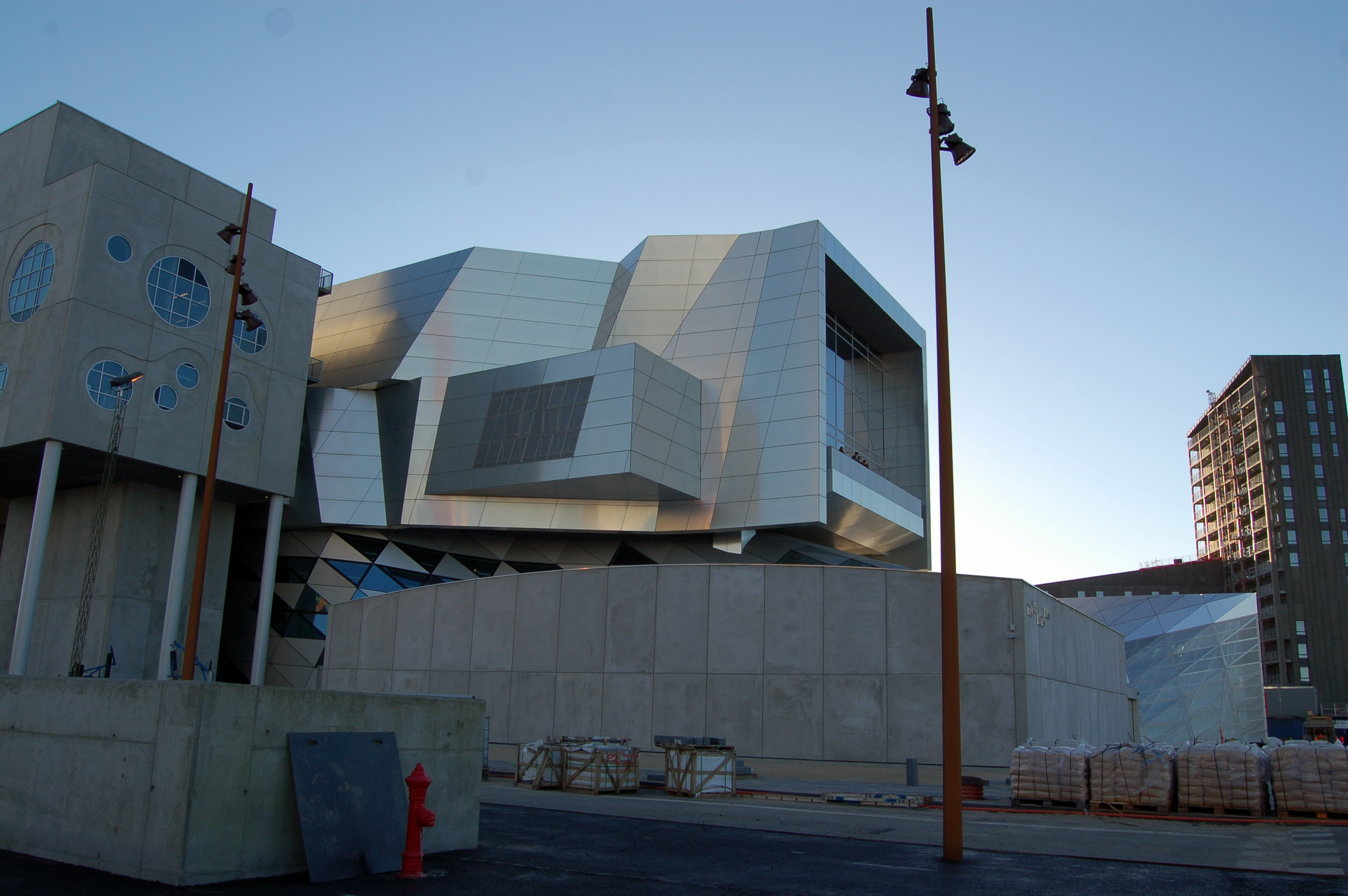
Musikkens Hus 2 weeks before opening

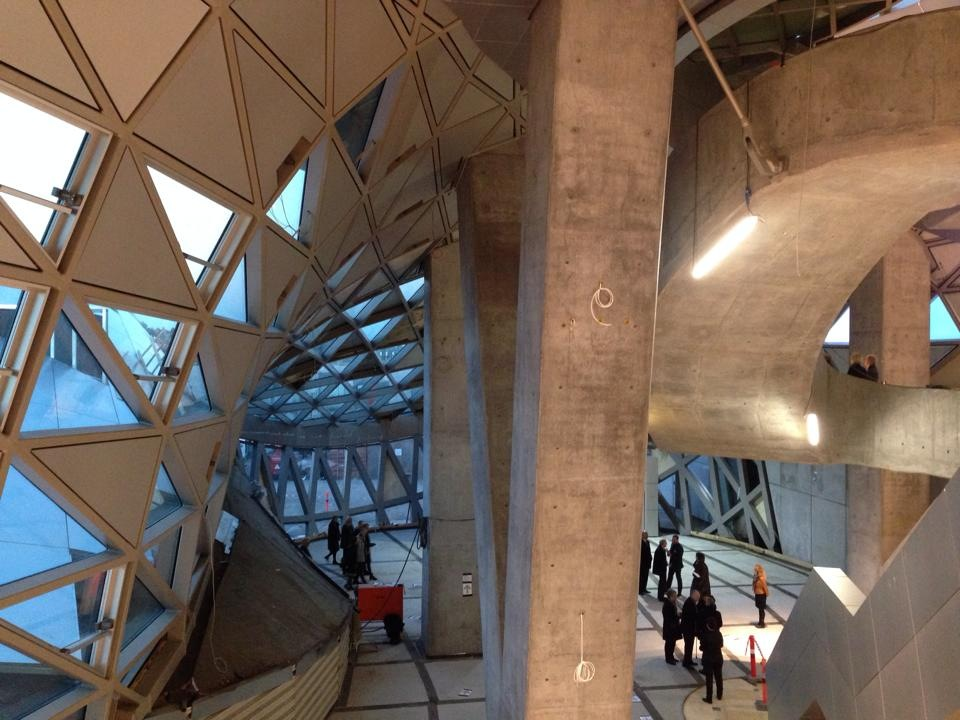
A part of the Foyer of Musikkens Hus during its construction in 2013

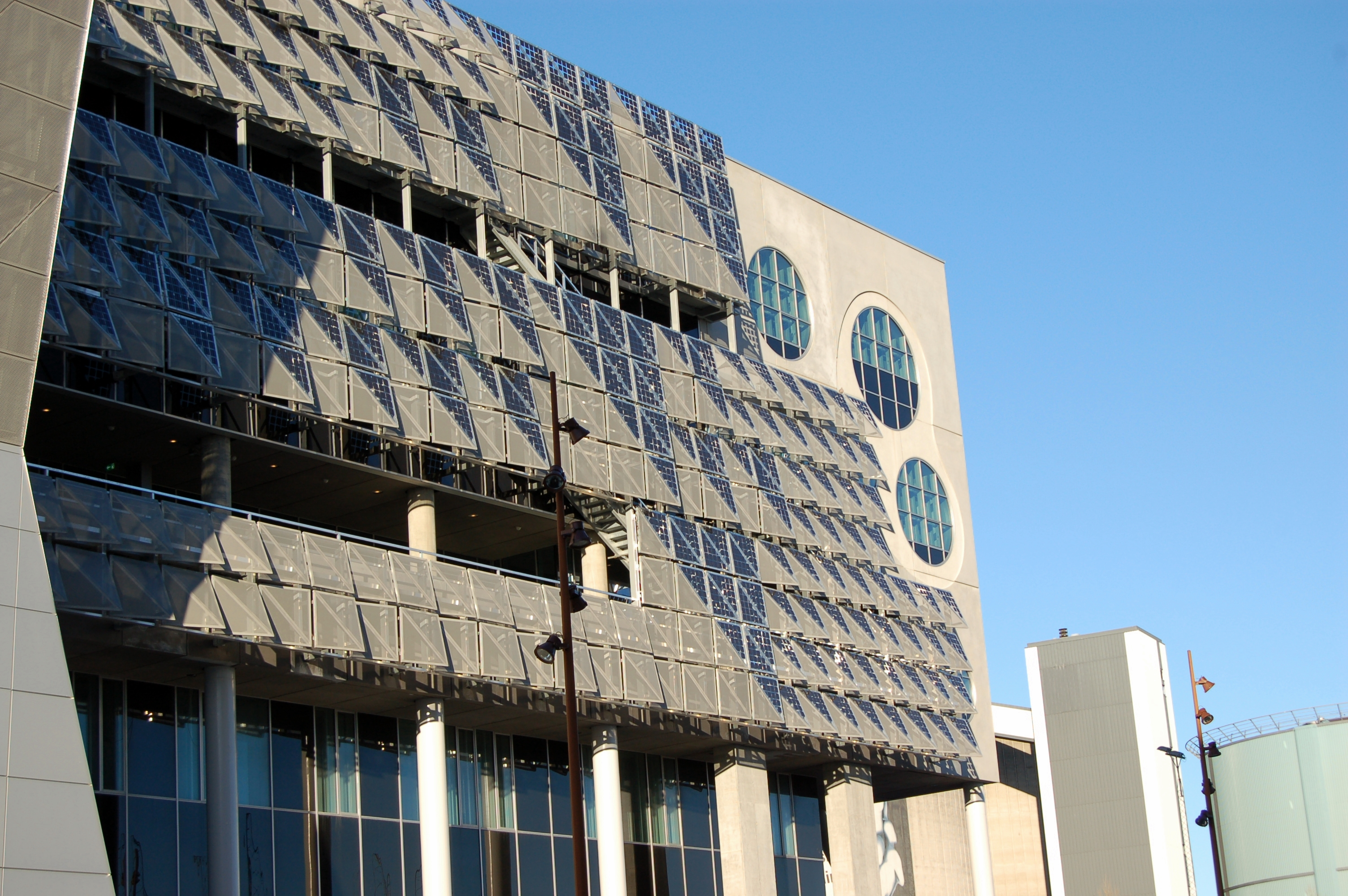
The solar panels cover the southern end of Musikkens Hus

== See also ==
- List of concert halls in Denmark
