= Venla Ilona Blom =

- Born: 1985 (age 40–41); Finland
- Genres: Folk music; A cappella; Beatboxing; Folktronica
- Occupations: Vocalist; Composer; Beatboxer
- Instrument: Vocals
- Years active: 2012–present
- Labels: Bafe's Factory; Nordic Notes
- Member of: Tuuletar; Piirainen Blom Company
- Website: venlailonablom.com

Venla Ilona Blom (born 1985) is a Finnish vocalist, composer, and beatboxer. She is best known as a founding member and the primary beatboxer of the vocal ensemble Tuuletar, and as Finland's only professional female beatboxer. Blom specialises in extended vocal techniques, vocal percussion, and traditional singing styles derived from Nordic and Finno-Ugric folk music.

In 2025, Blom made her operatic debut at the Semperoper Dresden, performing the role of Markéta in Kaija Saariaho's opera Innocence, a part specifically written for a singer with Finno-Ugric folk singing abilities.

== Early life and education ==
Blom was born in 1985 in Finland. She studied at the Royal Academy of Music in Aarhus, Denmark, as an exchange student, where she met the other members of Tuuletar in 2011.

Blom holds a Master of Music degree in vocal performance and composition from the Sibelius Academy (University of the Arts Helsinki), which she completed in 2018 with a focus on Global Music Studies. She also works as a part-time lecturer in the Global Music programme at the Sibelius Academy.

== Career ==
=== Tuuletar ===
In 2012, Blom co-founded the vocal ensemble Tuuletar with Sini Koskelainen, Johanna Kyykoski, and Piia Säilynoja. As the group's primary beatboxer, Blom creates the rhythmic foundation for their "vocal folk hop" sound, which combines Finnish folk tradition with contemporary beatboxing and harmonies. The group has performed in nearly 30 countries across five continents and won the EMMA Award for Best Ethno Album in 2017 and the Border Breaking Act of the Year award in 2019.

Tuuletar's music has been featured in major television productions, including HBO's Game of Thrones, the Australian series Wentworth, and the Netflix series Monarca and Rain.

=== Piirainen Blom Company ===
In 2018, Blom co-founded Piirainen Blom Company with fingerstyle guitarist J-P Piirainen. The ensemble combines acoustic guitar, beatboxing, vocals, and folk dance, creating contemporary interpretations of traditional Finnish dance music. The company released its debut album Matka / The Path in 2020 through Bafe's Factory.

=== Opera career ===
In spring 2025, Blom made her operatic debut at the Semperoper Dresden in Kaija Saariaho's opera Innocence, performing the role of Markéta. The role was specifically composed for a singer with Finno-Ugric folk singing abilities, and Saariaho chose to incorporate traditional Finnish vocal techniques into the opera's fabric. The production, directed by Lorenzo Fioroni and conducted by Maxime Pascal, received critical acclaim and was nominated for Best New Production at the International Opera Awards 2025.

=== Solo work ===
Blom's solo stage production Woman Machine premiered in September 2022 at the Theatre Museum Helsinki (Teatterimuseo) as part of Mad House Helsinki's NoMad House programme. The interdisciplinary work, which combines elements of concert, monologue and dance theatre, explores the impact of technology and information overload on mental health, particularly focusing on the millennial generation. The production was supported by Kone Foundation, Finnish Cultural Foundation, Arts Promotion Centre Finland, and Wihuri Foundation.

In September 2024, Blom released her debut solo album Nevrak through Nordic Notes. The folktronica album blends classical, folk, and electronic sounds. and explores themes drawn from legends, myths, and stories Blom collected during her travels around the world. Guest musicians on the album include kantele virtuosos Maija Kauhanen and Jutta Rahmel, and American actress Geneviève Andersen as a spoken word artist.

=== Other work ===
Blom has worked as a soloist with various Finnish ensembles, including the Tapiola Sinfonietta, Vantaa Entertainment Orchestra, and Student Union Singers (Ylioppilaskunnan Laulajat). She performed the vocal score for the 2021 Finnish nature documentary film Tale of the Sleeping Giants (Tunturin tarina), directed by Marko Röhr, alongside the Tapiola Sinfonietta.

She has participated in international music research projects and multicultural art projects, including fieldwork in Nepal in 2017, where she studied local musical traditions.

In addition to her artistic career, Blom is co-founder of mobile app start-up Yazzo.io.

== Awards and recognition ==
- 2017 – EMMA Award for Best Ethno Album (with Tuuletar)
- 2019 – Border Breaking Act of the Year at the Finnish Ethno-gala (with Tuuletar)
- Recipient of grants from the Finnish Cultural Foundation, Kone Foundation, Wihuri Foundation, and Arts Promotion Centre Finland

== Discography ==
=== Solo albums ===
- Nevrak (2024, Nordic Notes)

=== With Tuuletar ===
- Tules maas vedes taivaal (2016, Bafe's Factory)
- Rajatila / Borderline (2019, Bafe's Factory)

=== With Piirainen Blom Company ===
- Matka / The Path (2020, Bafe's Factory)
