= Outscape =

Outscape is a cello concerto written by the French composer Pascal Dusapin for the cellist Alisa Weilerstein in 2014–2015. It was premièred by Weilerstein and the co-commissioning Chicago Symphony Orchestra under conductor Cristian Măcelaru on May 26, 2016. Following its creation, Weilerstein gave the first European performances of the work with the Stuttgart and Paris Opera Orchestras in 2016 as well as the UK première at the Proms with the BBC Symphony Orchestra on July 19, 2017.

The concerto has since been taken up by Anssi Karttunen, who performed it in Casa da Música, Porto in November 2017.

== Overview ==
Outscape is a one-movement cello concerto with an overall arch-like structure. It eschews the genre's traditional opposition between soloist and orchestra. Rather than seeing them as rivals, Dusapin wanted to guide them towards each other and allow them to merge, with the cello "becoming an orchestra" and the orchestra "becoming a cello".

It starts with the cello playing a low, repeated C#. It is immediately echoed by the bass clarinet, which follow the soloist like a shadow. They are then joined by percussions and, later, piccolo. From this relatively simple beginning, the music very gradually intensifies, with the cello interacting with various chamber-like groups picked out of the orchestra, slowly gathering momentum and at long last reaching a tempestuous climax before returning to silence.

Soloist Alisa Weilerstein described Outscape as "a very interesting combination of yearning lyricism and urgent drive", almost "neo-romantic in that it is emotionally very open, and yet its orchestration and language is absolutely of today".

The work lasts about 28 minutes.

== Reception ==
Critical reception was positive, with Alexandra Coghlan notably describing the concerto as "a tale [she]'d be keen to hear again".

According to James L. Zychowicz,

Alisa Weilerstein... gave an intense and involving performance, with rich tone evident from the start. Her clarity in the more florid sections, riding above the full sound of the orchestra, was never strained, and she made the piece seem familiar—a testament to her involvement with the score. The audience responded with incredible warmth.

While John von Rhein stated that

If the Chicago Symphony Orchestra must be reduced to playing only one world premiere this season, let it be a new work as absorbing and important as French composer Pascal Dusapin's cello concerto, "Outscape"... Weilerstein, Macelaru and the orchestra deserve enormous credit for having argued the score's considerable merits at this level of dedication.
