= Orchestre national de Lille =

French orchestra

The Orchestre National de Lille is a French orchestra based in Lille. Its principal concert venue has been the Auditorium du Nouveau Siècle since 2003.

== History ==
The precursor ensemble of the orchestra was the Orchestre de l'ORTF de Lille, which was made defunct in 1974. In 1976, through the actions of the Région Nord-Pas-de-Calais and conductor Jean-Claude Casadesus, the orchestra was reformed as the Orchestre philharmonique de Lille. In 1980, with government sponsorship, the orchestra took its current name, the Orchestre National de Lille.

Jean-Claude Casadesus served as music director from 1976 to 2016. In March 2016, the orchestra announced the appointment of Alexandre Bloch as its next music director, effective with the 2016–2017 season. In December 2018, the orchestra announced the extension of Bloch's contract through the 2023–2024 season. Bloch concluded his Lille tenure at the close of the 2023–2024 season.

In October 2023, the orchestra announced the appointment of Joshua Weilerstein as its next music director, effective September 2024.

== Music directors ==
- Jean-Claude Casadesus (1976–2016)
- Alexandre Bloch (2016–2024)
- Joshua Weilerstein (2024–present)
