= Fulham Symphony Orchestra =

- Orchestra
- Former name: Fulham Municipal Orchestra
- Founded: 1958
- Location: London
- Principal conductor: Marc Dooley
- Website: fso.org.uk

Fulham Symphony Orchestra (FSO) is an amateur orchestra based in west London. It has given premieres of works by Wagner, Puccini and Tchaikovsky, performed with internationally renowned soloists, and featured many times in the national press.

== Performances ==
A number of internationally renowned soloists have played with the orchestra including Alina Ibragimova, Giovanni Guzzo and Martin Owen.

The FSO has collaborated with the BBC Symphony Orchestra on a number of projects and performances have been broadcast on BBC Radio 3 and BBC London.

Notable performances have included:

- Rare performances of Edgard Varèse's Dance for Burgess and Ecuatorial at the Barbican in 2017, which were broadcast on BBC Radio 3
- UK premiere of Charles Koechlin’s Vers la plage lointaine, 2012
- A rare performance of Vagn Holmboe’s Tuba Concerto, 2011
- A rare performance of František Jílek’s orchestral suite from Janáček’s opera From the House of the Dead, 2010
- UK premiere of Smetena's The Brandenburgers in Bohemia, 1978 (with Hammersmith Municipal Opera)
- UK premiere of Tchaikovsky's Festival Overture on the Danish National Anthem, 1977
- London premiere of Wagner's Die Feen, 1973 (with Hammersmith Municipal Opera)
- First fully staged UK performance of Delius' Fennimore and Gerda, 1968 (with Hammersmith Municipal Opera)
- UK premiere of Puccini's opera Edgar (1905 version), 1967 (with Hammersmith Municipal Opera)
- UK premiere of Giordano's Siberia (with Hammersmith Municipal Opera)
- The first concert at the open-air theatre in Bishop's Park, Fulham, 1960
- The first performance in England of Myaskovsky's Symphony No. 16, 1959

Their 2011 performance of Bruckner's Eighth Symphony at London's St John's Smith Square, was described by Bachtrack as "a terrific performance by splendid band". The Guardian's classical music critic wrote of being "surprised and impressed" by a performance in 2009.

== History ==
The orchestra performed its first concert on 8 November 1958 at Fulham Town Hall. The conductor was Siegfried de Chabot.

For nearly 30 years the musical director of the orchestra was Joseph Vandernoot. Later musical directors included Andrea Quinn, Peter Stark, Roland Roberts and Levon Parikian. Since 2001 the FSO's conductor has been Marc Dooley.

Originally named Fulham Municipal Orchestra, the orchestra was sponsored by Fulham Borough Council (later the London Borough of Hammersmith and Fulham) until the 1980s.
