= Seven Solos for Orchestra =

Seven Solos for Orchestra is an orchestral cycle written by the French composer Pascal Dusapin between 1992 and 2009. As the title suggests, it consists of seven pieces that can be played independently, although they were from the start conceived as a whole.

Some of these pieces have been championed by major conductors and orchestras like Simon Rattle (with the Berlin Philharmonic), Mstislav Rostropovich (with the Juilliard School Orchestra), and Myung-whun Chung (with the Orchestre philharmonique de Radio France). Pascal Rophé has recorded the whole cycle with the Orchestre Philharmonique de Liège.

== Origin ==
Seven Solos for Orchestra stems from Dusapin's ambition to write a large-scale piece at a time when he lacked a commission to realize it. His solution was to write seven independent but interrelated works over a period of 17 years, a process that calls to mind Wolfgang Rihm's Jagden und Formen.

In Dusapin's own words:

In the early 1990s I wanted to get away from the running times of between ten and twenty minutes that are invariably associated with commissions for orchestra. Since no one was offering me commissions to produce longer symphonic forms I decided to bide my time. I dreamt of an extended, complex form comprising seven autonomous episodes regenerating themselves from within, fertilising other possibilities, and proliferating on the interstices left open …

== Structure ==
- Solo No.1 Go (1992)
- Solo No.2 Extenso (1993/1994)
- Solo No.3 Apex (1995)
- Solo No.4 Clam (1998)
- Solo No.5 Exeo (2002)
- Solo No.6 Reverso (2005/2006)
- Solo No.7 Uncut (2008/2009)

== Overview ==
The first solo, Go, is predominantly violent and furious although it contains some quieter moments. It is built on various tetratonic scales, a characteristic that reappears throughout the whole cycle.

Extenso, which follows, is quieter and "ex-tends" some of the music used in Go. In turn, the material presented in Extenso will serve as the seed for several subsequent solos. It has been described as having a Mahlerian quality.

Apex is slower, darker and mostly harmonic. According to the composer, “The form advances by means of contractions and spasms” in this solo. Like Extenso, it ends quietly.

Next comes Clam, in which the music becomes almost static, with the focus now on wave-like shifts between various instrumental combinations.

After these two relatively slow solos, Exeo (Latin for "I go out") is characterized by the sharp contrasts created by the dramatic clash of the high and low registers of the orchestra.

Reverso is the longest of the seven pieces. It as built as a gradual crescendo that ends in a tumultuous climax. It is the only solo in the cycle that comprises different sections. Reverso features a prominent part for the harp and, like Extenso, rich string melodies.

The last piece, Uncut, sums up the whole cycle. It starts with a horn fanfare and then proceeds and expands steadily until a sudden end.

== Discography ==
- Pascal Dusapin, Orchestre National de Lyon (conductor Emmanuel Krivine, Montaigne – MO782124, 1997 (solos nos. 2 & 3)
- Dusapin – 7 Solos for Orchestra, Orchestre Philharmonique de Liège (conductor Pascal Rophé), Naïve Records – MO782180, 2010 (solos 1–7)
- Dusapin – Morning in Long Island, Orchestre philharmonique de Radio France (conductor Myung-whun Chung), Deutsche Grammophon – DG 4810786, 2014 (solos nos. 6 & 7)
