= Tuuletar =

Finnish vocal music ensemble

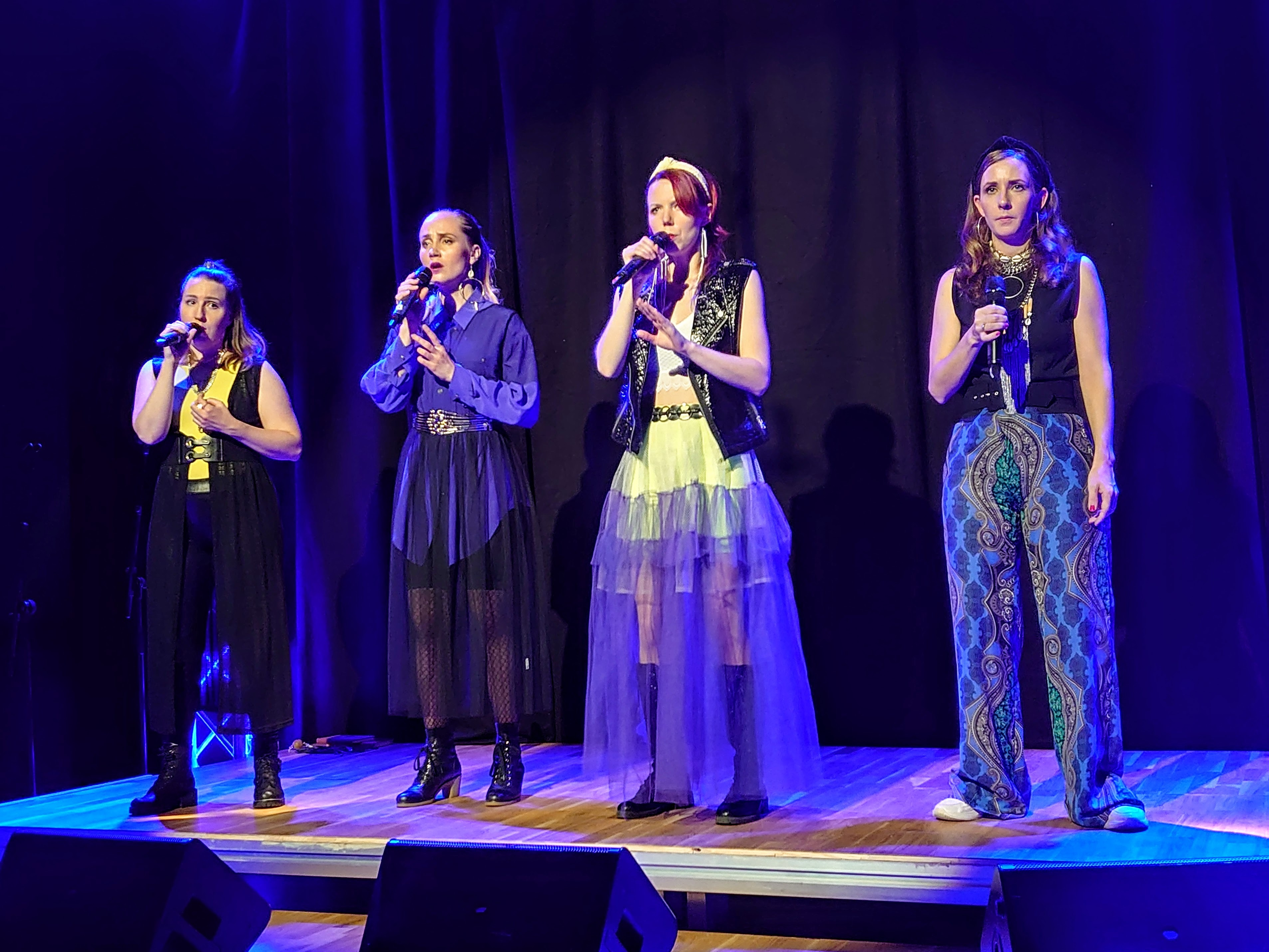
- Tuuletar performing in Växjö, Sweden, 2021

Background information
- Origin: Finland
- Genres: A cappella; world music; folk music; folk-pop; folk hop
- Years active: 2012–present
- Members: Venla Ilona Blom; Sini Koskelainen; Johanna Kyykoski; Piia Säilynoja
- Website: tuuletar.com

Tuuletar (meaning "Goddess of the Wind" in Finnish) is a Finnish vocal performance group formed in 2012. The ensemble consists of four vocalists, Venla Ilona Blom, Sini Koskelainen, Johanna Kyykoski and Piia Säilynoja, who create music using only their voices, combining Finnish folk tradition with beatboxing, harmonies and global influences. They describe their genre as "vocal folk hop".

The group has gained international recognition for their innovative approach to traditional Finnish music, winning the EMMA Award for Best Ethno Album in 2017 and the Border Breaking Act of the Year award at the Finnish Ethno-gala in 2019. Their music has been featured in major television productions including HBO's Game of Thrones and several Netflix series.

== Formation and background ==
The members of Tuuletar met in 2011 while studying as exchange students at the Royal Academy of Music in Aarhus, Denmark. They performed their first concert as a band in 2012.

The group's name was inspired by the Kanteletar, a collection of traditional Finnish folk poetry compiled by Elias Lönnrot. "Tuuletar" can be translated as "Goddess of the Wind", referring to a female spirit of nature that controls the wind in Finnish mythology.

== Musical style ==
Tuuletar's music is characterised by vocal harmonies, beatboxing, and vocal percussion, drawing from Finnish and Nordic folk traditions whilst incorporating influences from American hip hop, South Asian folk music, and Bulgarian vocal traditions. The group creates all sounds using only the human voice, though they employ electronic effects and layering in studio recordings and live performances.

Their repertoire includes original compositions inspired by Finnish mythology and the natural environment, as well as reinterpretations of traditional folk material. The lyrics often draw from the Kalevala and other sources of Finnish folk poetry.

== Discography ==
=== Studio albums ===
- Tules maas vedes taivaal (2016, Bafe's Factory) – Debut album recorded with Liquid 5th Productions in North Carolina, US. Reached number 8 on the World Music Charts Europe and number 10 on the Transglobal World Music Chart. Won the EMMA Award for Best Ethno Album of the Year in 2017.
- Rajatila / Borderline (2019, Bafe's Factory) – Second album, produced by Pekko Käppi. The album features guest musicians including jouhikko player Pekko Käppi and vocalist Antti Paalanen. It reached the Top 10 of both the World Music Charts Europe and Transglobal World Music Chart.

=== EPs and singles ===
- Ahavana kulemme (EP, 2013)
- "Kohma" (single, 2015)
- "Ei leijuta" (single, 2016)
- "Uho" (single, 2017)
- Valtaaja / Invader (EP, 2019) – Featuring the title track produced with Pekko Käppi
- Vetten vuoro / Turn of the Tide (EP, 2021) – Three-track release created during the COVID-19 pandemic, exploring themes of isolation and reconnection
- "Loimu (Mikko Heikinpoika Remix)" (single, 2021)

== Tours and performances ==
Since their formation, Tuuletar has performed extensively across Europe, Asia, Oceania and the Americas. The group has appeared at major world music festivals including WOMAD (United Kingdom, Australia, New Zealand), WOMEX (Spain, Finland), Songlines Encounters (UK), Budapest RITMO (Hungary), EtnoKrakow (Poland), Sur Jahan (India), Taiwan A Cappella Festival, and the Kaustinen Folk Music Festival in Finland.

In October 2016, Tuuletar performed an exclusive radio concert at WOMEX for the EBU Live Sessions, hosted by NRK and BBC. The group has toured extensively in Japan, conducting three major Asian tours that included performances in India, Japan, and Taiwan. They have also toured in Chile, performing at the Festival Músicas del Mundo in 2023.

In Finland, Tuuletar has performed at notable venues including the Finnish Presidential Palace and has appeared on the popular television programme Vain elämää. The group has also performed film score concerts with the Tapiola Sinfonietta for Tale of the Sleeping Giants.

== Media placements ==
Tuuletar's song "Alku" (The Beginning) was licensed for use in the Season 7 DVD and Blu-ray commercial for HBO's Game of Thrones in 2017, bringing the group international attention. The song was also featured in the Australian television series Wentworth (Fox).

The group's music has been placed in several Netflix productions, including the Mexican drama series Monarca and the Danish series Rain.

Tuuletar performed the vocal score for the Finnish nature documentary film Tunturin tarina (Tale of the Sleeping Giants, 2021), directed by Marko Röhr. The film, which explores the wildlife and mythology of Finnish Lapland, features music composed by Panu Aaltio and performed by Tuuletar alongside the Tapiola Sinfonietta.

== Awards and recognition ==
- 2017 – EMMA Award for Best Ethno Album of the Year for Tules maas vedes taivaal
- 2017 – Nomination for Folk Music Songwriter of the Year at the Finnish Ethno-gala
- 2019 – Border Breaking Act of the Year at the Finnish Ethno-gala
- 2019 – Nomination for Folk Music Creator of the Year at the Finnish Ethno-gala
- 2019 – Nomination for the Finnish Music Publishers' Association Award (genre-free category)
