= Joseph Vandernoot =

- Born: 18 October 1914; London
- Died: 7 June 1999 (aged 84); London
- Education: Royal College of Music
- Occupation: Conductor
- Organization(s): Ballet Rambert, Fulham Symphony Orchestra, Hammersmith Municipal Opera

Joseph Vandernoot (18 October 1914 – 7 June 1999) was a British conductor who worked with many orchestras and opera companies, and was one of the earliest conductors of opera at the Holland Park open-air theatre in London.

After studying at Guildhall School of Music and the Royal College of Music, Vandernoot joined the Royal Artillery and worked for some time for ENSA.

For five years Vandernoot was the musical director of Ballet Rambert. He also conducted the Orchestre National de Monte Carlo and the Valencia Provincial Orchestra.

Vandernoot was the musical director of the Fulham Municipal Orchestra for nearly 30 years, and of the Hammersmith Municipal Opera, the first municipal opera company in Great Britain. With these two ensembles he gave the UK premiere of Puccini's opera Edgar (1905 version) in Fulham Town Hall in 1967. In 1973 he recorded Sullivan's Ivanhoe with the Beaufort Opera, and the recording was released by the "Rare Recorded Editions" and "Legends" labels. He founded the Opera Lirica which performed at the Holland Park open-air theatre from 1987, and also founded the Kew Sinfonia.

== Related websites ==
Fulham Symphony Orchestra (amateur orchestra, formerly the Fulham Municipal Orchestra)

Kew Sinfonia
