= Thomas Andie =

Danish footballer (born 1972)

Thomas Andie Jensen
Personal information
- Date of birth: April 17, 1972 (age 53)
- Place of birth: Mariager, \Denmark\
- Position: Defender

Senior career*
Years	Team	Apps	(Gls)
1996	Brøndby IF	0	(0)
1996–2001	Lyngby FC	62	(2)
2001–2007	Viborg FF	155	(11)
- * Club domestic league appearances and goals

Thomas Andie Jensen (born April 17, 1972) is a Danish former professional football (soccer) player, who played as a defender for Viborg FF in the Danish Superliga championship.

Andie started his senior career with Brøndby IF, and played one first team game for the club. He moved to Lyngby FC, playing 62 games and scoring two goals for Lyngby in the Danish Superliga from May 1997 to June 2001. He moved to league rivals Viborg FF, playing 161 games and scoring 11 goals for Viborg in the Superliga. Andie ended his playing career in December 2007.
