= Elim Chan =

Hong Kong conductor (born 1986)

- 陳以琳
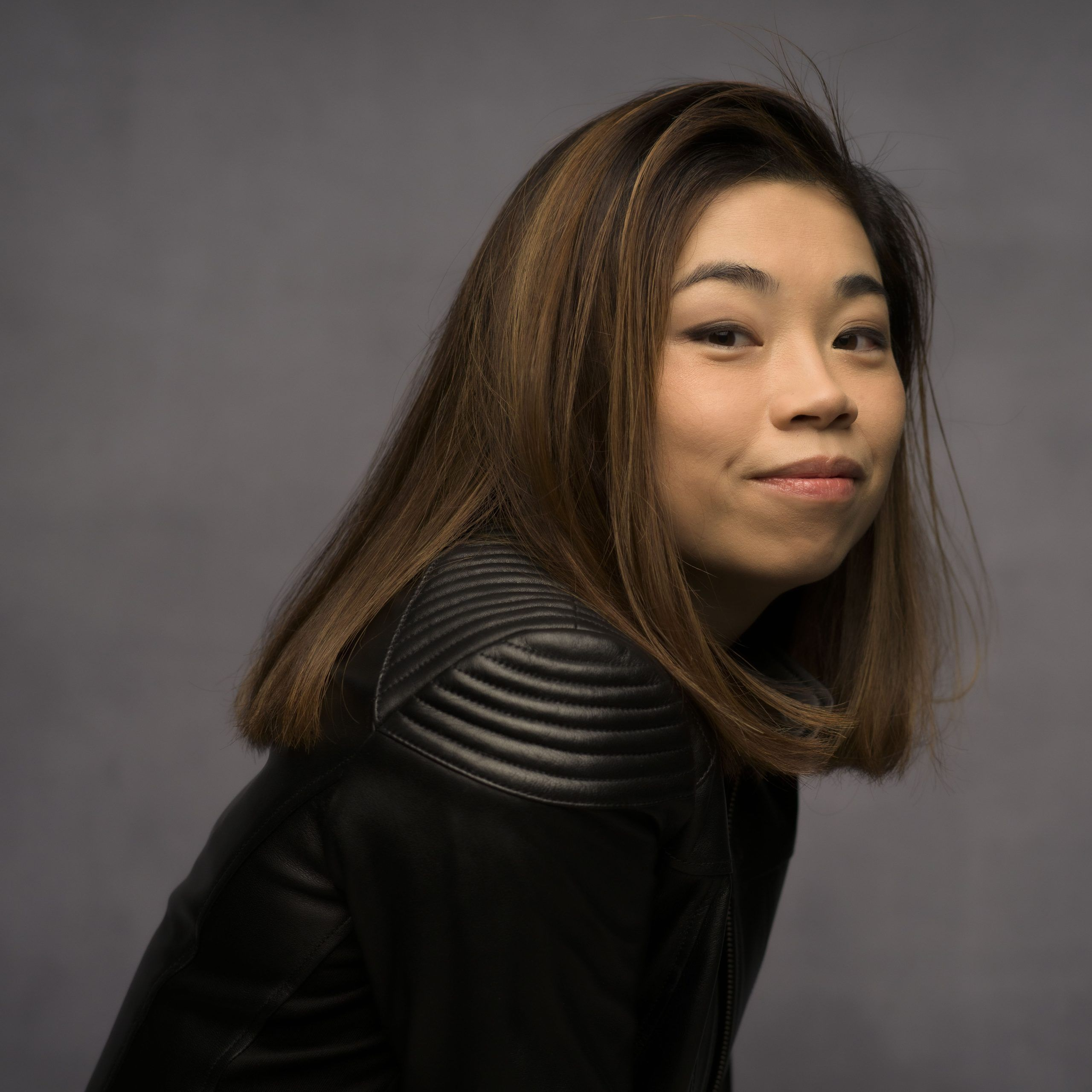
- Born: November 18, 1986 (age 39); Hong Kong
- Occupation: Conductor
- Years active: 2014–present
- Website: elimchan.com

Elim Chan
- Traditional Chinese: 陳以琳
- Simplified Chinese: 陈以琳
Transcriptions
Standard Mandarin
- Hanyu Pinyin: Chén Yǐlín
- Wade–Giles: Can^{4} Ji^{5}-lam^{4}

Elim Chan (Chinese: 陳以琳; pinyin: Chén Yǐlín; born November 18, 1986) is a Hong Kong-born conductor. She is music director-designate of the San Francisco Symphony and will become the orchestra’s first female music director when her six-year term begins in September 2027. Chan previously served as chief conductor of the Antwerp Symphony Orchestra and principal guest conductor of the Royal Scottish National Orchestra. She also holds the title of artistic partner with the Vienna Symphony.

== Early life and education ==
Chan was born in Hong Kong. In her youth, she played cello and piano and sang in choirs. Chan attended the Good Hope School (Form One) and was a sixth-form student at Li Po Chun United World College. In Hong Kong she participated in choral groups and learned to play piano.

Chan studied at Smith College in the United States, where she first concentrated on biology and psychology and took courses in forensic science. Following an initial experience in conducting during her second year of college, she changed her program of study and graduated with a Bachelor of Arts degree in music in 2009. At Smith she sang in various student choruses, was given opportunities to conduct, and encouraged to pursue conducting. Chan pursued graduate studies in music at the University of Michigan, where her teachers included Kenneth Kiesler. She was music director of the University of Michigan Campus Symphony Orchestra and of the Michigan Pops Orchestra in 2012/13. She earned her master's degree in orchestra conducting from Michigan in 2011 and her Doctor of Musical Arts in 2015. Partway through her graduate studies, Chan spent a year in Chile working in music education with children from impoverished communities.

== Career ==
In December 2014, at age 28, Chan won the Donatella Flick Conducting Competition, the first female conductor to win the competition. As the competition winner, she was named assistant conductor of the London Symphony Orchestra with a one-year contract for 2015/16. The orchestra's principal conductor, Valery Gergiev, invited her to participate in a tour of Mexico with the Mariinsky Theatre Orchestra. She then spent a year as a Dudamel Fellow with the Los Angeles Philharmonic. She also took part in conducting master classes with Bernard Haitink, whom she regards as a mentor. The Financial Times wrote in 2024 that her restrained podium technique, built on small, deliberate gestures, follows Haitink’s example.

=== NorrlandsOperan ===
In April 2016, NorrlandsOperan (Umea, Sweden) announced Chan's appointment as its next chief conductor, effective in 2017, with an initial contract of three years. In April 2018, Chan announced that she planned to step down as chief conductor of NorrlandsOperan after one season.

=== Royal Scottish National Orchestra ===
In January 2017, she made her first guest-conducting appearance with the Royal Scottish National Orchestra (RSNO). She returned as guest conductor with the RSNO two weeks later as an emergency substitute for Neeme Järvi. In June 2017, the RSNO appointed Chan as its next principal guest conductor, effective 2018. Chan concluded her tenure as principal guest conductor of the RSNO in March 2023.

=== Antwerp Symphony Orchestra ===
Chan guest-conducted the Antwerp Symphony Orchestra for the first time in November 2017. She returned as guest conductor in March 2018. In May 2018, the orchestra announced her appointment as its next chief conductor, effective the 2019/20 season. Chan is both the first female conductor and the youngest chief conductor of the orchestra. She concluded her tenure as chief conductor of the Antwerp Symphony Orchestra at the close of the 2023–2024 season, one season earlier than her previously announced contract extension.

=== Guest conducting ===
Chan has guest-conducted the Boston Symphony and the Cleveland Orchestra. Her first guest-conducting appearance with the San Francisco Symphony was in January 2023. She debuted with the New York Philharmonic in 2024.

=== San Francisco Symphony ===
Chan returned for additional guest-conducting appearances with the San Francisco Symphony in October 2023 and in March 2025. In May 2026, the San Francisco Symphony announced the appointment of Chan as its 13th music director, effective the 2027/28 season, with an initial contract of six years. She took the title of music director-designate with immediate effect. Chan is the first woman named music director of the San Francisco Symphony's 115-year history.

== Personal life ==
Chan is married to the Dutch percussionist Dominique Vleeshouwers. The couple reside in London, having previously lived in Amsterdam.

Chan has described Hong Kong’s culture as a blend of Chinese and British influences and considers herself a hybrid of the two. She has said the 2019–2020 Hong Kong protests and their aftermath led her to think more about her identity as a Hongkonger. As of 2024, Chan had not conducted in mainland China. She told the Financial Times she had turned down an earlier opportunity there because it would have required limiting what she could say and post publicly, and that she was unsure how she would handle future tours there.

She boxes as a hobby.

Cultural offices
Preceded by Rumon Gamba	Chief Conductor, NorrlandsOperan; 2017–2018	Succeeded by Eduardo Strausser
Preceded by Edo de Waart	Chief Conductor, Antwerp Symphony Orchestra; 2019–2024	Succeeded by Marc Albrecht
