= Aksel Nielsen =

Danish-American philanthropist (1901–1984)

- Born: January 11, 1901; Mariager, Denmark
- Died: October 18, 1984 (aged 83); Denver, Colorado
- Citizenship: American
- Occupation: Banker
- Known for: 1953 Advisory Commission on Government Housing Policies and Programs
- Spouse: Helen Maurer
- Children: 1

Aksel Nielsen (January 11, 1901 – October 18, 1984) was a Danish-American philanthropist, founder of the Mortgage Banking Association’s School of Mortgage Banking, a member of the Civil and Defense Mobilization Board and close friend and financial adviser to President Dwight D. Eisenhower.

== Early life ==
He was born in Mariager, Denmark and immigrated to the United States in 1910, becoming a naturalized citizen in 1922.

In the 1920s, Nielsen married Helen Maurer and in 1927 the two had a daughter named Virginia Nielsen.

== Career ==
He worked in the banking and real estate industries and served as mortgage solicitor in 1925 for the Title Guaranty Company of Denver, Colorado. He eventually became executive vice president, president and chairman of the board for this company.

In September 1953 President Eisenhower appointed him to the Advisory Commission on Government Housing Policies and Programs. During this same period of time Nielsen also was president and then chairman of the board of the Mortgage Investments Company. In 1958 he became a member of the Civil and Defense Mobilization Board whose responsibility it was to advise the Director of the Office of Civil and Defense Mobilization.

== Death ==
He died of cancer in Denver in 1984.
