= Rumon Gamba =

British conductor (born 1972)

Rumon Gamba (born 24 November 1972) is a British conductor.

== Biography ==
Gamba studied music at Durham University, and then went to the Royal Academy of Music in London, where he studied conducting with Colin Metters, George Hurst and Sir Colin Davis. He became the first conducting student to obtain the DipRAM (the Royal Academy of Music performer's diploma). He was a 1998 prize winner in the Lloyds Bank BBC Young Musicians Conductors Workshop. In 1998, he joined the BBC Philharmonic as its Assistant Conductor, and later became Associate Conductor. He left the orchestra in 2002.

Gamba was Chief Conductor and music director of the Iceland Symphony Orchestra from 2002 to 2010. He first conducted at NorrlandsOperan in northern Sweden in a concert of English music in 2007. Subsequently, in October 2008, he was named the next chief conductor and music director of NorrlandsOperan, with an initial contract of three years, effective from the 2009–2010 season. In March 2011, Gamba was named chief conductor of the Aalborg Symphony Orchestra, and formally took up the post as of the 2011–2012 season. His initial contract was for three years. He stood down from the Aalborg post in 2015.

Following his house debut at English National Opera (ENO) conducting Candide, for ENO's first-ever production of the work, Gamba returned to ENO in 2011 to conduct the world premiere of Nico Muhly's opera Two Boys. In 2005, he conducted the premiere of the Brett Dean Viola Concerto in London with the composer as soloist. In 2014, Gamba gave the Australian premiere, and a rare concert performance, of the original 1915 version of Sibelius's 5th symphony.

During the opening week of the European City of Culture festival in Umeå in January 2014, Gamba conducted a complete Beethoven symphony cycle in the Konsertsalen where each of the nine symphonies was prefaced by the premiere of a new work by a contemporary composer. The concerts were all broadcast on Swedish radio. Later that year he conducted Elektra in an outdoor production by Carlus Padrissa and La Fura dels Baus staged at a large business park in Umeå, Umestan Företagspark; a film was later issued on DVD.

In January 2022, Gamba became chief conductor of the Oulu Symphony Orchestra. In February 2024, the Oulu Symphony Orchestra announced the extension of Gamba's contract as chief conductor through 2026.

Gamba has made over 50 CDs of for the Chandos Records label, including their Film Music series. With the BBC Philharmonic, Gamba has recorded works of various composers, including Miklos Rozsa, Richard Addinsell, John Addison, Malcolm Arnold, Arnold Bax, Bernard Herrmann, Erich Wolfgang Korngold, and Ralph Vaughan Williams. With the Iceland Symphony Orchestra, he has recorded music of Vincent d'Indy. He has also recorded music of Lord Berners and Constant Lambert with the BBC Concert Orchestra.

Cultural offices
Preceded by Rico Saccani	Chief Conductor and Music Director, Iceland Symphony Orchestra; 2002–2010	Succeeded by Ilan Volkov
Preceded by Andrea Quinn	Chief Conductor and Music Director, NorrlandsOperan; 2009–2015	Succeeded by Elim Chan
Preceded by Matthias Aeschbacher	Chief Conductor, Aalborg Symphony Orchestra; 2011–2015	Succeeded by Joshua Weilerstein
Preceded by Johannes Gustavsson	Chief Conductor, Oulu Symphony Orchestra; 2022–present	Succeeded by incumbent
