= John Frandsen (composer) =

Danish composer

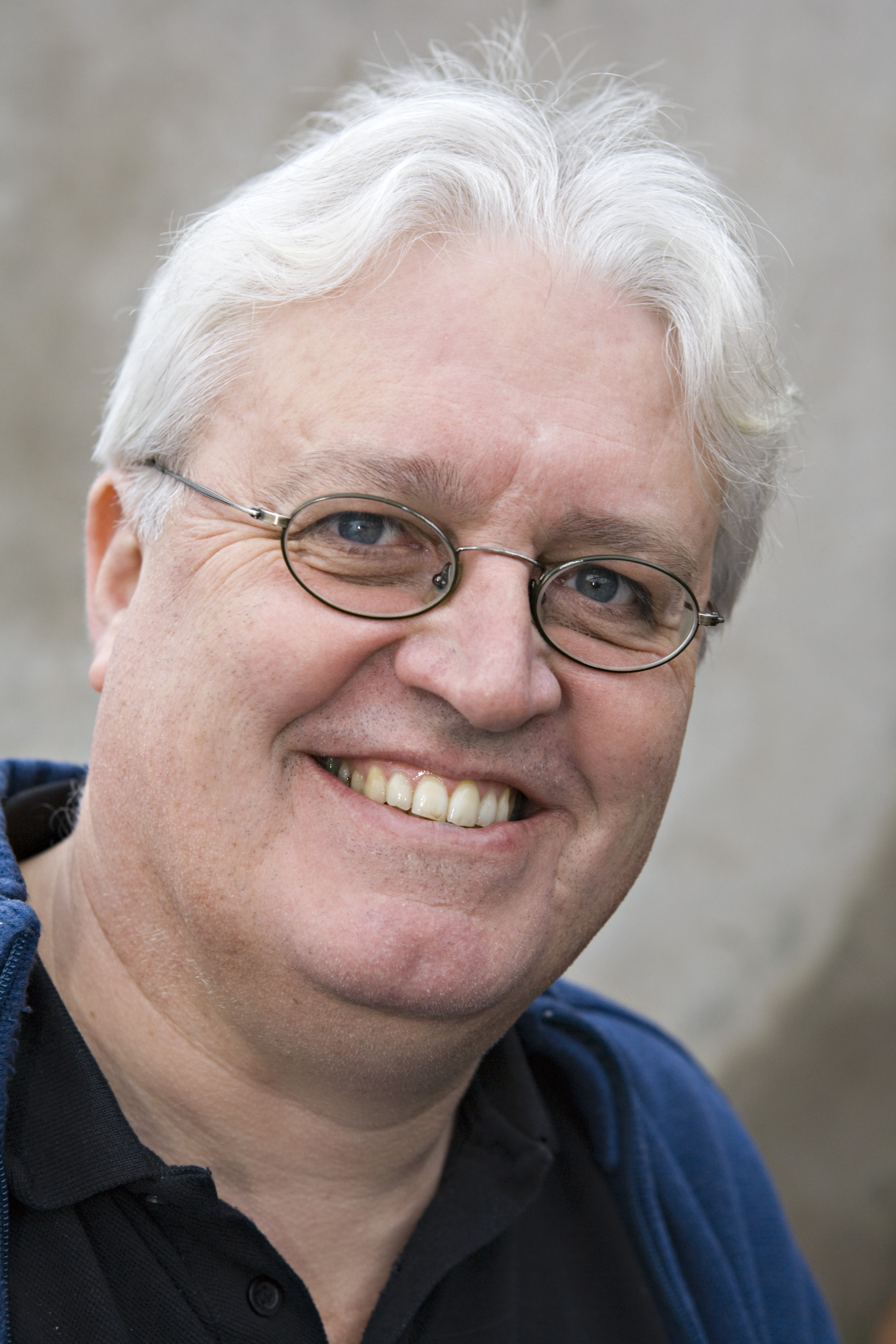

John Frandsen (born 13 March 1956) is a Danish composer, organist and choral conductor, whose work includes operas, chamber music, and religious music. His 1999 Now Flashes the White Light of the Spirit commissioned to celebrate the 150th anniversary of the establishment of the Danish Evangelical Lutheran Church was performed simultaneously in over 100 Danish churches on the day of the anniversary.

== Biography ==
Frandsen was born in Aalborg and studied at Aarhus University and the Royal Academy of Music in Aarhus with Hans Abrahamsen and Karl Aage Rasmussen. From 1993 to 1995 he was chairman of the music committee of the Danish National Arts Foundation, and since 1999 he has been chairman of the Danish Composers' Association.

His opera trilogy, Tugt og Utugt I Mellemtiden (Virtue and Vice in the Meantime), based on the novel of the same name by Svend Aage Madsen premiered in 1998 at the Aarhus Summer Opera. His other operas include Amalie (premiered 1995 at the Musikteateret Undergrunden in Aarhus), Dronning Boudicca (Queen Boudica) (premiered in 1997 at Anden Opera in Copenhagen) and I-K-O-N (premiered in 2002 at the Royal Danish Theatre.

== Religious music ==
John Frandsen's commissions for religious music include:

- Stabat Mater for tenor and organ, commissioned by the Sorø Organ Festival (1986)
- Det evige Halleluja (The Eternal Hallelujah) cantata for soprano, contralto, mixed choir, recitation and organ, commissioned by the Amager Music Festival (1992)
- Talsmand som på jorderige (Advocate as on Earth) for mixed choir a cappella, commissioned by the Dansk Kirkesang (Danish Sacred Song Society)
- Nu blitzer Åndens hvide lys (Now Flashes the White Light of the Spirit) ten variations for organ solo with a concluding choral movement, commissioned by the Danish National Evangelical Lutheran Church (1999)
- Messe til det nye Årtusinde (Mass for the New Millennium) for five soloists, chamber choir, male choir, large choir, brass, chamber orchestra and organ, first performed in Aarhus on 31 December 1999.

== Sources ==
- Nielsen, Svend Hvidtfelt, John Frandsen, 2000
- Aarhus Sommer Opera Tugt og Utugt I Mellemtiden - John Frandsen
