= Symphony No. 16 (Myaskovsky) =

Nikolai Myaskovsky's Symphony

Nikolai Myaskovsky's Symphony No. 16 in F major, op. 39, was composed in 1935–36 and has the nickname Aviation Symphony.

The Symphony is in four movements:

1. Allegro vivace
2. Andantino e semplice, in B♭ major
3. Sostenuto. Andante marciale, ma sostenuto in A minor
4. Tempo precedente. Allegro ma non troppo (A minor followed by F major)

Myaskovsky is said to have told his biographer Alexey Ikonnikov that the slow movement of the symphony was inspired by the crash of the Tupolev ANT-20 "Maksim Gorky". However, Patrick Zuk goes on: "One suspects that this 'content' was bestowed on the movement retrospectively ... there is no mention of the crash, or indeed, anything to do with aviation in Myaskovsky's own programme note."

The premiere was on 24 October 1936, in Moscow with the Moscow Philharmonic conducted by E. Szenkar. The first performance in England was given by Fulham Municipal Orchestra in 1959, conducted by Siegfried De Chabot.

The first movement begins with a triplet accompaniment and a chromatic main theme. The second movement is a dance-like intermezzo. This is followed by a funeral march, and following without pause, a finale that quotes a song written by Myaskovsky, "The Aeroplanes are Flying".
