= Kristjan Järvi =

Estonian conductor and composer

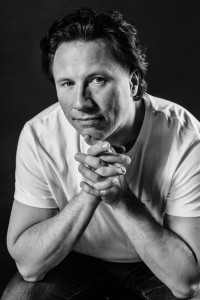
- Kristjan Järvi in 2019
- Born: June 13, 1972 (age 54); Tallinn, then part of Estonian SSR, Soviet Union
- Occupations: conductor, composer, producer
- Known for: founder of Absolute Ensemble; founder and former artistic director of Baltic Sea Philharmonic; founder of Sunbeam Productions and Nordic Pulse

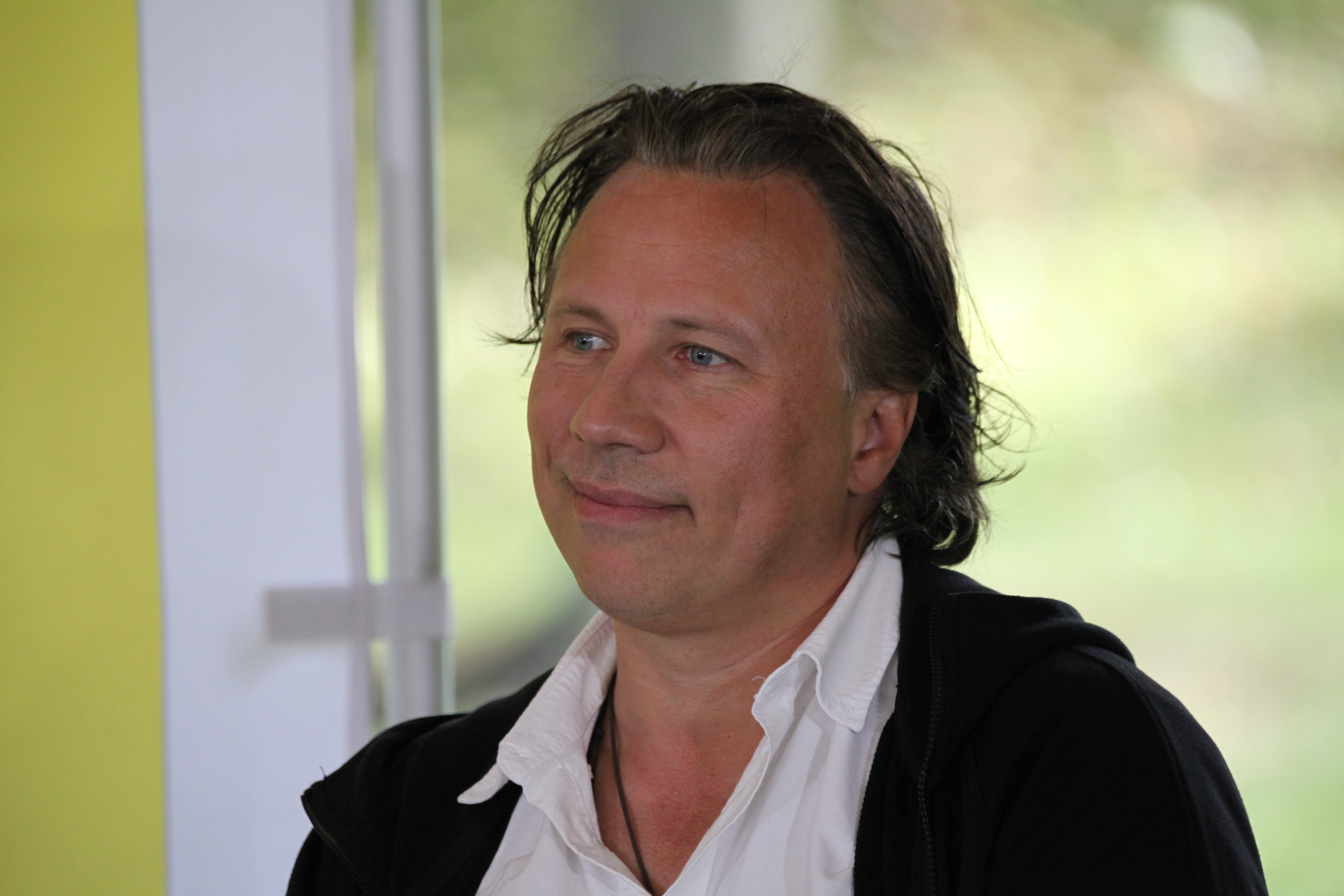
Kristjan Järvi at the Opinion Festival 2021 in Paide, Estonia

Kristjan Järvi (Estonian pronunciation: [ˈkristjɑn ˈjærʋi], alternate (U.S.) spelling: Kristian Järvi) (born 13 June 1972) is an Estonian conductor, composer and producer. Born in Tallinn, Estonia, he is the younger son of the conductor Neeme Järvi and brother of conductor Paavo Järvi and flutist Maarika Järvi.

== Early life ==
When Järvi was age 7, his family emigrated to the United States and settled in Shrewsbury, New Jersey. He became an American citizen in 1985. He grew up in New York City. Järvi studied piano with Nina Svetlanova at the Manhattan School of Music. He later went on to study conducting at the University of Michigan under Kenneth Kiesler.

== Career ==
From 1998 to 2000, Järvi was Assistant Conductor to Esa-Pekka Salonen at the Los Angeles Philharmonic. He and the composer Gene Pritsker co-founded the Absolute Ensemble, based in New York City, in 1993, with Järvi as its music director. In 2007, Järvi and the Absolute Ensemble were awarded the Deutsche Bank Prize for Outstanding Artistic Achievement.

Järvi was Chief Conductor and Music Director of NorrlandsOperan from 2000 to 2004. From 2004 to 2009, Järvi was Chief Conductor and Music Director of the Tonkünstler Orchestra, Vienna. Järvi was Artistic Advisor to the Kammerorchester Basel and founded the Baltic Sea Philharmonic (formerly Baltic Youth Philharmonic). He served as the orchestra´s artistic director until 2024. Under his leadershio, the orchestra developed a distinctive performance style combining memorised performance, movement, theatrical presentation and corss-genre programming with the technical support of Sunbeam Productions. He subsequently developed Nordic Pulse, an ensemble connected to Sunbeam Productions. Nordic Pulse combines orchestral instruments, electronic music influences and original compositions, and collaboated with artists including Coldplay, Robot Koch, Nico Muhly, Jon Hopkins and Brian Eno. In April 2011, Järvi was appointed the next chief conductor of the MDR Symphony Orchestra effective with the 2012–2013 season, with an initial contract of 3 years. His MDR contract was extended in 2015. In March 2017, the MDR announced that is to conclude his MDR Symphony Orchestra after the close of the 2017–2018 season.

In addition to a Grammy nomination, Järvi has previously been awarded the German Record Critics Prize and a Swedish Grammy for the recording of Hilding Rosenberg's opera "Isle of Bliss". He has recorded Leonard Bernstein's Mass with the Tonkünstler Orchestra and Absolute Ensemble. While Järvi's repertoire includes pieces from the Classic and Romantic periods, he is also a specialist for 20th-century composers and contemporary music, having commissioned works by Arvo Pärt, Heinz Karl Gruber, Erkki-Sven Tüür, Ezequiel Viñao, Peeter Vähi, Dave Soldier, Joe Zawinul, Stefano Bollani and Gediminas Gelgotas among others. In 2014, Järvi and the French record label Naïve Classique launched the 'Kristjan Järvi Sound Project', an ongoing series featuring recordings from all of Järvi's ensembles.

Alongside Absolute Ensemble and the Baltic Sea Philharmonic, Järvi leads Nordic Pulse, an ensemble developed through his Creativity Labs initiative. Nordic Pulse combines orchestral musicians, electronic music influences and original compositions, and has collaborated with artists including Coldplay, Robot Koch and Nico Muhly. The ensemble has also participated in soundtrack recordings for international film and television productions.

As a recording artist, Järvi has more than 60 albums to his credit, from Hollywood soundtracks such as “Cloud Atlas”, “Sense 8” (both productions of the Wachowski sisters), “Hologram for the King” (directed by Tom Tykwer), Wochenendrebellen, Babylon Berlin Seris and award-winning albums on Sony Classical and Chandos, to his eponymous series: the “Kristjan Järvi Sound Project” and recording for Max Richter.

In 2016, Järvi founded Sunbeam Productions, a creative production company focused on interdisciplinary music, film and live performance projects. Through Sunbeam Productions, he has developed large-scale productions including Babylon Berlin Live, multimedia concert experiences, film soundtrack projects and collaborations across classical, electronic and contemporary music genres. In 2020, he signed with BMG Modern Recordings and released the album Nordic Escapes and founded nEscapes Records, an independent label focused on releaces connected to his creative projects, artistic collaborations. The label developed the concept of nEscapes Lounges, immersive listening hubs, combining music environment and audience interaction as retuning tools for mental health.

Through Sunbeam Productions, Järvi has increasingly focused on immersive and multidisciplinary productions. These include Babylon Berlin Live (streaming on ARD Mediathek), featuring Max Raabe, Sabin Tambrea and Meret Becker. Other productions included Jon Hopkin´s Live adaptation of Ritual ("Nordic Pulse Ritual" in 2025).

In 2021 Järvi also founded the Nordic Pulse Hotels. Creativity labs that invite non-musicians and musicians to creative collaboration and way of live, leading to new productions and recordings in their writing labs.

Kristjan has collaborated with Brian Eno on Live orchestrations of Eno´s SHIPS in a tour and has served as artistic partner for Bright & Black, a project combining metal music developed together with producer Jacob Hellner and Eicca Toppinen of Apocalyptica.

His work has also included collaborations with Bryce Dessner, Max Richer, Robot Koch, Steve Reich, Philipp Glass, Bastille and in 2026 orchestrating Kontra K and Calum Scott under the production of Channel Aid.

After “Snow Maiden” and “Swan Lake”, Kristjan’s own arrangements of Tchaikovsky’s Theatre Works series on Sony Classical takes off with its third release: “Sleeping Beauty”. Next releases will be “The Nutcracker”.

== Composer ==
As a composer Järvi has active many compositions, of modern style and some composed with the German composer Johnny Klimek of Klimek-Tykwer-Heil fame, and some for orchestra, vocal, chorus or synth instruments. Many of Järvi´s recent compositions and productions have been developed through and with members of Nordic Pulse. Some of his partial compositions are:

- Rattle, with Johnny Klimek (2019)
- Pendleonium, with Johnny Klimek (2019)
- NEBULA (2019)
- Aurora (2019)
- Kritical Mass (2018)
- Babylon Charleston (2018), for the series Babylon Berlin.
- Midnight Sun
- White Dragon
- Nordic Amazonia
- On the break of Dawn (2024), collaboration with Estonian electronic group Cartoon and singer kitty Florentine.
- Siiapoole+ Rave, Remix by Markus Kusing and Polosiva

His Album is Nordic Escapes, released in August 2020 on Modern Recordings (BMG)

== Other Activities ==
Järvi Serves as Honorary Consul of the Rupublic of South Korea in Estonia.

== Bibliography ==
- Järvi, Kristjan (2014): "A Soundtrack to Our Lives..." . In: Stoppe, Sebastian (ed.), Film in Concert: Film Scores and their Relation to Classical Concert Music, pp. 131–144. ISBN 978-3-86488-060-5 doi:10.25969/mediarep/16802.
- Nordic Pulse documentary https://www.imdb.com/de/title/tt9833068/

Cultural offices
Preceded by Roy Goodman	Chief Conductor, NorrlandsOperan; 2000–2004	Succeeded by Andrea Quinn
Preceded by Jun Märkl	Chief Conductor, MDR Leipzig Radio Symphony Orchestra; 2012–2018	Succeeded by Dennis Russell Davies
Preceded by (no predecessor)	Artistic Director and Chief Conductor, Baltic Sea Philharmonic; 2008–2024	Succeeded by
