= Andrea Quinn =

- Born: 22 December 1964 (age 60)
- Genres: Classical
- Occupation: Conductor
- Website: http://www.andreaquinn.com/

Andrea Quinn (born 22 December 1964) is an English conductor.

== Biography ==
Quinn is a graduate of the University of Nottingham and of the Royal Academy of Music. In 1993, Quinn won the Royal Opera House's "Conduct for Dance" competition, and has since then been in great demand as a ballet conductor. Early in her career, she conducted the London Philharmonic Youth Orchestra, and Fulham Symphony Orchestra.

Quinn was music director of The Royal Ballet from 1998 to 2001, the first female music director in the company's history. Quinn was music director of New York City Ballet (NYCB) from 2001 to 2006, the first female director in NYCB's history. She was chief conductor of NorrlandsOperan from 2005 to 2009, the first female conductor to hold the post in the company's history.

In 2000, Quinn received a nomination for Female Artist of the Year at the Classical Brit Awards She and her husband have three children.

== Selected recordings ==
- Camille Saint-Saëns: Piano Concertos Nos. 2 and 5, Brigitte Engerer, piano; Ensemble orchestral de Paris (Mirare, 2008)
- Thierry Pécou: L'Oiseau innumérable, Ensemble orchestral de Paris, piano: Alexandre Tharaud, Harmonia Mundi n° HMC 801974, 2008
- Paul McCartney: Tuesday, London Symphony Orchestra, EMI Records

Cultural offices
| Preceded by Gordon Boelzner | Music Director, New York City Ballet; 2001–2006 | Succeeded by Fayçal Karoui |
| Preceded by Kristjan Järvi | Chief Conductor, NorrlandsOperan; 2005–2009 | Succeeded by Rumon Gamba |
