= Pascal Dusapin =

French composer

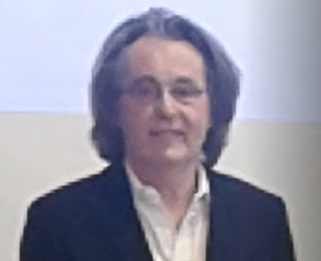
- Dusapin in 2020
- Born: 29 May 1955 (age 71); Nancy, France
- Education: University of Paris
- Occupation: Composer

Pascal Georges Dusapin (born 29 May 1955) is a French composer. His music is marked by its microtonality, tension, and energy.

A pupil of Iannis Xenakis and Franco Donatoni and an admirer of Varèse, Dusapin studied at the University of Paris I and Paris VIII during the 1970s. His music is full of "romantic constraint". Despite being a pianist, he refused to compose for the piano until 1997. His melodies have a vocal quality, even in purely instrumental works.

Dusapin has composed solo, chamber, orchestral, vocal, and choral works, as well as several operas, and has been honored with numerous prizes and awards.

== Education and influences ==
Dusapin, born in Nancy, studied musicology, plastic arts, and art sciences at the University of Paris I and Paris VIII in the early 1970s. He felt a certain "shock" upon hearing Edgard Varèse's Arcana (1927), and a similar shock when he attended Iannis Xenakis's multimedia performance Polytope de Cluny in 1972, yet he felt "une proximité plus grande" ("a greater closeness") to the latter composer. Because of his attraction to Xenakis's music, Dusapin studied with the composer at the Sorbonne in Paris, where he remained a student from 1974 to 1978. His classes with Xenakis included such subjects as aesthetics and science. Dusapin also studied with Italian composer Franco Donatoni, who was invited to the University of Vincennes (Paris VIII) in 1976.

While Dusapin's studies with these composers formed a foundation for his compositional studies—particularly for his understanding of sound masses—he developed his own musical language. According to I. Stoïnova, "Though attached to ... Varèse, Xenakis, Donatoni, Dusapin is nevertheless completely solitary because he is not only aware of his legacy, but also of the distance which separates him from his mentors: a creative distance of an aesthetic order and sensibility, a way of existing in sounds". He absorbed styles and ideas from these composers, then transformed them to fit his own musical needs.

Besides being influenced by composers such as Varèse and Xenakis who dealt with sound masses, Dusapin's music also shows the influence of other musical traditions, including jazz. In fact, he was once a jazz pianist, though up until 1997 he refused to include piano in his compositions. Beginning in the late 1980s with his piece Aks (1987) and continuing into the 1990s, Dusapin incorporated French folk music into his musical language. In Aks, commissioned by the Société des Amis du Musé des Arts et Traditions Populaires, Dusapin immediately quotes a folk-melody, but the rest of the piece is composed independently from the folk song. Dusapin's work from the 1990s further illustrates the influence of folk music through its frequent use of drones and use of restricted modes, though most often without obvious tonal centers. Other sources of inspiration include graphic arts and poetry.

== Musical style ==
=== Instrumentation ===
One way in which Dusapin stands out from other contemporary composers is through his selection of certain instruments and rejection of others. Unlike even Xenakis, he avoids the use of electronics and technology in his music. Likewise, he has removed the use of percussion other than timpani from his works. Until recently, Dusapin also rejected the use of keyboard instruments, despite the fact that he plays the organ and jazz piano. As a possible reason for Dusapin's rejection of these instruments, Stoïnova suggests, "The scale and static timbre of the piano, as well as the noisy, uniform textures of percussion are incorporated with difficulty by Dusapin into his microtonal perspective which seems to define the very essence of his dynamic melodism." Stoïnova, however, wrote this article four years before Dusapin completed the Trio Rombach (1997), for piano, violin or clarinet, and cello. This piano trio was the first work in which Dusapin incorporated piano, and not until 2001 did he complete a piece for solo piano, Sept Études (1999–2001).

=== Microtonality ===
Dusapin's music is also marked by its microtonality, which is often achieved through the integration of micro-glissandi and micro-intervals (intervals of less than one semitone). Dusapin combines both micro-intervals and regular intervals into melodic lines so that the listener never knows what to expect next. Even so, Dusapin manages to make his use of microtonality feel completely natural. As Stoïnova explains, "The micro-intervals and the micro-glissandi ... in such instrumental works as Inside (1980) for viola, Incisa (1982) for cello, and many other pieces are, in effect, completely integrated as different by entirely 'natural' components in extremely supple melodic progressions". The listener is already familiar with the uniform division of the octave in equal intervals; Dusapin merely divides the octave by a less traditional number.

=== Musical form ===
Dusapin rejects the hierarchical, binary forms of most European music, but neither is his music aleatory. Dusapin characterizes the European "hierarchical" form as thinking in terms of variations, so that certain parts are always of more importance than others. Instead of composing in this way, Dusapin seems to compose measure by measure, deciding what he wants to happen next when he gets there. This process slightly alludes to the chance-like aspect of aleatory music, but Dusapin's music is so precisely composed that it cannot truly be aleatoric. Stoïnova writes, "With regard to Dusapin's music we can observe a principle of auto-organization and complexity in the compositional system through the integration or assimilation of aleatory disturbances." In other words, Dusapin lets the music go where it will, often evoking aleatory idioms, while still notating everything and maintaining control of his music. He avoids repetition and rejects stability and redundancy in music, which is yet another distinguishing feature of his music.

=== Tension, energy, and movement ===
Perhaps the most prominent and unique element of Dusapin's music is its built-in tension, energy, and sense of movement. Indeed, in his article on Dusapin, Julian Anderson cites the "enclosing tensions" and "explosive flight" as the two extremes of Dusapin's early music and claims that these idioms are what make the composer's music so highly individual. Stoïnova also emphasizes the energy that is present in Dusapin's earlier compositions, giving credit to Dusapin's use of extreme registers, flutter tongue, trills, micro-intervals, glissandi, multiphonics, rapid articulations, drastic dynamics, and continuous breathing. These unique features make Dusapin's music incredibly intense and demanding on its performers. In fact, the intensity is such that Dusapin consciously makes pieces like Musique captive (1980) have short durations (in this case, three minutes), for by their ends the musicians and listeners alike are completely exhausted.

=== Later characteristics ===
Many of the characteristics discussed above are especially prevalent in Dusapin's earlier works, especially those from the 1980s. Beginning in the next decade, Dusapin's work moved more and more toward greater harmonic and melodic simplicity. Paul Griffiths notes that Dusapin's works from the 1990s are more harmonically conceived than his previous music, and that they incorporate more folk traditions, including the use of drones and modes. He further suggests that Dusapin continued to simplify his music as he moved into the twenty-first century, and that while the composer still avoids diatonicism, he uses techniques like oscillating between two notes and constantly varying small patterns, which involve more repetition than his past music.

== Collaboration with Accroche Note ==
The instrumentation of Dusapin's music is often based upon available players, and during the 1980s and 1990s, he often wrote for the Ensemble Accroche Note, a Strasbourg-based new music group founded by a singer and clarinetist. Ian Pace proposes that the influence of the group's clarinetist Armand Angster might be a reason for the prominence of the clarinet in much of Dusapin's music from this time period. Griffiths, too, makes note of the important role of the clarinet in the series of shorter pieces that Dusapin wrote after the completion of his first opera, Roméo et Juliette (1985–89). Dusapin's tendency to write for specific instrumentalists (in this case, clarinetist Angster) reveal a practical and realistic side of the composer.

== Notable works ==
=== Musique captive (1980) and Musique fugitive (1980) ===
Two of Dusapin's earlier works composed in the same year, Musique captive (1980) and Musique fugitive (1980), might be studied together in that they are both unstable and aim to avoid any sort of repetition. At the same time, however, the pieces go about achieving these goals in two very different ways. Musique captive is written for nine wind instruments (piccolo, oboe, soprano saxophone, bass clarinet, contrabass clarinet, contrabassoon, two trumpets, and bass trombone) and lasts just three minutes, for, as Stoïnova suggests, the tension and high demands on the performers are such that the piece could not last any longer. Stoïnova further describes the piece as internally destroying itself, writing, "The musical ideas of this piece—tremolo textures, a rising chromatic figure, violent crescendi, an expanding mass of detail etc.—destroy each other or to be more exact annihilate each other." Dusapin thus throws many musical ideas together, a concept that Pace relates to free jazz. The resulting music is highly unstable and simply cannot endure longer than its three-minute duration. The piece was first performed in July 1981 in La Rochelle, France.

Musique fugitive, on the other hand, achieves its instability through musical "ruptures." Written for string trio, the piece avoids the traditional process of statement and variation, thus breaking away from any sense of unity and continuity. Dusapin achieves this effect by stating one idea, then abruptly changing course through either sudden silence or the introduction of a new musical progression. Premiered in Aix-en-Provence, France, in June 1980, Musique fugitive, Pugin claims, has become "virtually a repertoire piece in France." The Arditti String Quartet recording of the piece can be heard on Spotify.

=== La Rivière (1979) and L'Aven (1980–81) ===
La Rivière (1979) and L'Aven (1980–81) are two orchestral pieces based on ideas of nature that, according to Julian Anderson, show off the "more exuberant, violent side of Dusapin's style." Both pieces focus on characteristics of water and symbolize its fluidity and strength through music. The first piece opens with solo cello, which "spreads through" and "absorbs" the whole orchestra, as water would do. Indeed, in this piece Dusapin aims to realize the "movement of changing speeds, of the strength of flow." L'Aven, on the other hand, captures the image of water slowly dripping and opening a hollow in stone. A concerto for flute and orchestra, the work begins with the flute being just barely audible over the orchestra, but it gradually pushes its way through the orchestral texture until it is the prominent voice of the work. Thus, the flute represents the dripping water, and the orchestra represents the stone. The flute plays without stop for ten minutes, always pushing against the orchestra and ultimately coming out on top. Both pieces received their premiere in Metz, France: La Rivière in November 1979, and L'Aven in November 1983.

=== Niobé ou le Rocher de Sypile (1982) ===
Niobé ou le Rocher de Sypile (1982) is a thirty-eight-minute work for twelve mixed voices, solo soprano (Niobé), and eight instruments (oboe doubling English horn, two clarinets [the second doubling bass clarinet], two bassoons [the second doubling contrabassoon], trumpet and two tenor trombones), with a neo-Latin text by Martine Irzenski. Irzenski's text is taken from fragments of Latin literary works and does not necessarily follow the chronology of the Greek myth of Niobe. Dusapin himself classifies the work as a "staged oratorio", rather than an opera or piece of musical theatre, and in it he once again avoids repetition and continuity and seeks to freely make textural connections. The solo soprano voice is pitted against the twelve voices of the mixed chorus, who serve a number of different purposes throughout the course of the work, sometimes extending the timbre of Niobé's voice, sometimes moving in relation to the text. In his article on Dusapin, Anderson also highlights the variety of vocal techniques and textures used in the oratorio, including microtonal chords for the chorus and the monodic soprano line at the end of the work. Through its non-linear text and multiple textural layers, 'Niobé ou le Rocher de Sypile' maintains the same sense of discontinuity as Dusapin's earlier chamber works. The work was first performed in Paris on 16 June 1984.

=== Roméo et Juliette (1985–88) ===
According to Ian Pace, Dusapin's first opera, Roméo et Juliette (1985–88) is the "pivotal work" in the composer's career, for it is in this work that he first "properly" combines his ideas of narrative to the theatrical realm. Pugin views Dusapin's opera as a return to the "more fruitful" style of Niobé, and cites Dusapin's vocal pieces Mimi (1986–87), Il-Li-Ko (1987), and Anacoluthe (1987) as study pieces for the creation of his first opera, particularly for the setting of the French language. Anderson, meanwhile, notes the greater amount of lyricism that exists in Dusapin's opera as compared to his earlier works. All three authors seem to agree that the opera is a noteworthy point in Dusapin's compositional career.

The libretto, written by Olivier Cadiot, is divided into nine numbers: the first four dealing with events before the revolution, the final four involving events after the revolution, and the fifth and central number being the revolution itself. This central movement is the only one played purely by the orchestra. The opera focuses not only on Roméo and Juliette, but also on their doubles, Roméo 2 and Juliette 2, who appear before the revolution and seem to symbolize "an expansion of their personalities." The opera also involves a chorus that comments on the action and a vocal quartet that serves as an intermediary and teaches Roméo and Juliette revolutionary concepts. Finally, there is the character of Bill, who teaches Roméo and Juliette to sing, but who himself only speaks until the eighth number, when he at last sings as well. In the latter half of the work, the characters discuss the possibility of creating a real opera, only to discover the "impossibility of opera, the story and even language itself", and the music breaks down into microtonality and fragmentation. The opera was premiered on 10 June 1989 in Montpellier, France.

=== Seven Solos for Orchestra (1992–2009) ===
His next major project was the large-scale orchestral cycle Seven Solos for Orchestra composed between 1992 and 2009. It consists of seven works that can be played independently but were from the start conceived as a whole.

In the composer's own words:

In the early 1990s I wanted to get away from the running times of between ten and twenty minutes that are invariably associated with commissions for orchestra. Since no one was offering me commissions to produce longer symphonic forms I decided to bide my time. I dreamt of an extended, complex form comprising seven autonomous episodes regenerating themselves from within, fertilising other possibilities, and proliferating on the interstices left open ..."

The cycle treats the orchestra as a large solo instrument and is the closest Dusapin has come to traditional symphonic thinking.

=== Current projects ===
In May 2016, Alisa Weilerstein and the Chicago Symphony Orchestra premièred Outscape, Dusapin's second cello concerto, to positive critical reception. The same year Dusapin was invited to Geneva in the framework of the Arts at CERN programme.

His most recent opera, Macbeth Underworld, premièred at La Monnaie in Brussels in September 2019.

== Complete list of works ==
=== Solo instrumental ===
- Inside, for viola (1980)
- Incisa, for cello (1982)
- If, for clarinet (1984)
- Item, for cello (1985)
- Itou, for bass clarinet (1985)
- Ici, for flute (1986)
- Iti, for violin (1987)
- Indeed, for trombone (1987)
- I Pesci, for flute (1989)
- In et Out, for double bass (1989)
- Invece, for cello (1991)
- Ipso, for clarinet (1994)
- Immer, for cello (1996)
- In nomine, for viola (2000)
- Sept études, for piano (1999–2001)
- Imago, for cello (2001)
- Memory, hommage crypté et monomodal à Ray Manzarek for organ (2008)
- Ictus, for bass clarinet (2008–2009)
- In Vivo, for solo violin (2015)

=== Chamber ===
- Musique fugitive, for string trio (1980)
- Trois Instantanés, for 2 clarinets and 3 cellos (1980)
- String quartet n°1 (1982–1996)
- Poco a poco (1986)
- Sly, for trombone quartet (1987)
- Laps, for clarinet and double bass (1988)
- Neuf Musiques pour «Le Fusil de chasse», for clarinet, trombone and cello (1989)
- String quartet n°2 Time Zones (1989)
- Attacca, pour 2 trumpets and timpani (1991)
- Stanze, for brass quintet (1991)
- Ohimé, for violin and viola, hommage for Besty Jolas (1992)
- String quartet n°3 (1993)
- Ohé, for clarinet and cello (1996)
- String quartet n°4 (1997)
- Trio Rombach, for piano, violin or clarinet and cello (1997)
- String quartet n°5 (2004–2005)
- String quartet n°6 (2009), with orchestra
- String quartet n°7 (2009)
- Microgrammes, 7 pieces for string trio (2011)
- By the way, for clarinet and piano (2014)
- Slackline, for cello and piano (2015)
- Forma fluens, for violin and piano (2018)

=== Orchestra and ensemble ===
- Souvenir du silence (1976)
- Le Bal (1978)
- Timée (1978)
- La Rivière, for orchestra (1979)
- Musique captive, for 9 wind instruments (1980)
- Tre Scalini, for orchestra (1981–1982)
- Fist (1982)
- Hop' (1983–1984)
- La Conversation (1984)
- Treize Pièces pour Flaubert (1985)
- Assaï, for orchestra (1985)
- Haro (1987)
- Coda (1992)
- Seven Solos for Orchestra (1992–2009)
  - Go, solo n°1 for orchestra (1992)
  - Extenso, solo n°2 for orchestra (1993–1994)
  - Apex, solo n° 3 for orchestra (1995)
  - Clam, solo n° 4 for orchestra (1997–1998)
  - Exeo, solo n° 5 for orchestra (2002)
  - Reverso, solo n°6 for orchestra (2005–2006)
  - Uncut, solo n°7 for orchestre (2009)
- Khôra, for string orchestra (1993)
- Loop, for 2 cello quartets (1996)
- Cascando (1997)
- Perelà Suite, for orchestra (2004)
- Morning in Long Island (2010)

=== Concertante ===
- Flute
  - L'Aven, flute concerto (1980–1981)
  - Galim, 'Requies plena oblectationis', for flute and string orchestra (1998)
- Cello
  - Celo, cello concerto (1996)
  - Outscape, cello concerto (2016)
- Violin
  - Quad, 'In memoriam Gilles Deleuze', for violin and 15 musicians (1996)
  - Aufgang, violin concerto (2011–2012)
- Piano
  - A Quia, piano concerto (2002)
  - Jetzt Genau! concertino for piano and 6 instruments (2012)
- Other
  - Aria, clarinet concerto (1991)
  - Watt, trombone concerto (1994)
  - At Swim-Two-Birds, double concerto for violin and cello (2017)
  - Waves, for organ and orchestra (2019)

=== Vocal ===
- Igitur (1977)
- Lumen (1977)
- L'Homme aux liens, for 2 sopranos and 3 violins (1978)
- Shin'gyo, for soprano and piccolo flute (1981)
- Niobé ou le rocher de Sypile (1982)
- To God, for soprano and clarinet (or saxophone soprano) (1985)
- Mimi for 2 women's voices and ensemble (1986–1987)
- Aks (1987)
- Red Rock, from «Roméo et Juliette» (1987)
- Anacoluthe (1987)
- For O., for 2 women's voices and 2 clarinets (1988)
- So Full of Shapes is Fancy, for soprano and bass clarinet (1990)
- Comoedia (1993)
- Canto, for soprano, clarinet and cello (1994)
- Two Walking, five pieces for two women's voices (1994)
- Dona Eis (1998)
- Momo (2002)
- Ô Berio, for soprano and 13 instruments (2006)
- O Mensch! (Inventaire raisonné de quelques passions Nietzschéennes), for baritone and piano (2008–2009)
- Beckett's Bones for soprano, clarinet and piano (2013)
- Wenn du dem Wind... (3 scènes de l'opéra Penthesilea) for mezzo-soprano and orchestra (2014)
- Wolken, for female voice and piano (2014)

=== Operas ===
- Roméo et Juliette (1985–1988)
- Medeamaterial (1990–1991)
- La Melancholia (1991)
- To Be Sung (1992–1993)
- Perelà, uomo di fumo (2001)
- Faustus, the Last Night (2003–2004)
- Passion (2009)
- Penthesilea (2015)
- Macbeth Underworld (2019)
- Il Viaggio (2022)

=== Choral ===
- Semino (1985)
- Il-Li-Ko (1987)
- Granum sinapis (1992–1997)
- Umbrae mortis, for mixed choir (1997)
- Disputatio, for children's chorus, mixed choir, string orchestra, percussion and glass harmonica (2014)

== Recognition ==
Dusapin has won the following prizes and awards:

- 1979 – Hervé Dugardin Prize (SACEM)
- 1981–83 – Scholarship holder at the Villa Medici in Rome
- 1993–94 – Composer-in-residence with the Orchestre National de Lyon
- 1993 – Prize of the Académie des Beaux-Arts
- 1993 – Prix du Syndicat de la Critique (Critics' Circle Award)
- 1994 – SACEM Prize for Symphonic Music
- 1995 – French Ministry of Culture awarded him the Grand Prix National de Musique
- 1998 – Victoire de la Musique in 1998 for a CD recorded by the Orchestre National de Lyon, and 'Composer of the Year' in 2002.
- 2007 – Dan David Prize (shared with Zubin Mehta)

In 2019, writers of The Guardian ranked Passion (2008) the 14th greatest work of art music since 2000, with Tim Ashley writing, "The score subtly alludes to Monteverdi and French baroque, but the sound world it creates is uniquely Dusapin's own: tense, quietly mesmerising and austerely beautiful."
