= Arts Council of Finland =

The Arts Promotion Centre Finland (Finnish: Taiteen edistämiskeskus, Swedish: Centret för konstfrämjande) is an expert and service agency for promoting the arts in Finland. Arts Promotion Centre Finland is organized under the Ministry of Education and Culture. It is funded by the Ministry of Education and is composed of national councils for architecture, cinema, dance, design, literature, music, photography, theater and fine arts.

The Arts Promotion Centre Finland together with its arts councils and boards awards grants to professional artists and subsidies to communities in the field of the arts.
