= Donald Weilerstein =

American violinist and pedagogue (born 1940)

- Born: 1940 (age 85–86); Washington, D.C., U.S.
- Spouse: Vivian Hornik Weilerstein
- Children: Alisa Weilerstein, Joshua Weilerstein

Academic background
- Education: Juilliard School (BM, MM)

Academic work
- Discipline: Music
- Sub-discipline: Violin performance
- Institutions: Juilliard School; New England Conservatory of Music

Donald Weilerstein (born 1940) is an American violinist and pedagogue.

== Early life and education ==
Weilerstein was born in Washington, D.C., and raised in Berkeley, California. He began playing the violin at the age of four and earned a Bachelor of Music and Master of Music from the Juilliard School.

== Career ==
In 1969, he founded the Cleveland Quartet, becoming its first violinist, a position he held until 1989. Since 2004, he has been the Dorothy Richard Starling Chair in Violin Studies at New England Conservatory of Music and since 2001, he is a faculty member at the Juilliard School. His students have won first prize in the Yehudi Menuhin International Competition for Young Violinists and first prize in the International Violin Competition of Indianapolis. In addition, he is a member of the Weilerstein Trio with his daughter, Alisa Weilerstein, and wife, Vivian Hornik Weilerstein. Weilerstein is a fellow of the Music Academy of the West. His son, Joshua Weilerstein, has guest conducted with the New York Philharmonic Orchestra.
