= Aalborg Symphony Orchestra =

Symphony orchestra in Aalborg, Denmark

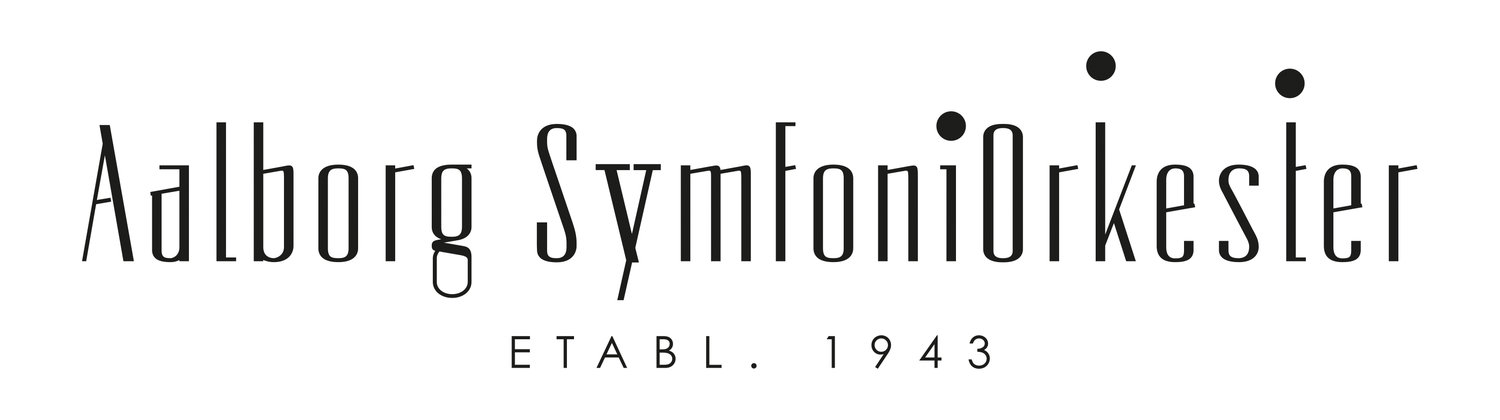
Logo

The Aalborg Symphony Orchestra (Danish: Aalborg Symfoniorkester) is a Danish symphony orchestra based in Aalborg, Denmark. The orchestra is resident at the concert hall of Musikkens Hus and has the status of a regional orchestra of Jutland. In addition to its regular subscription series of symphonic concerts, the orchestra also serves as an opera and ballet orchestra for performances with the Royal Danish Theatre and the Danish National Opera.

== History ==
Jens Schrøder founded the Aalborg Symphony Orchestra in 1943 and served as its first chief conductor until 1979. Subsequent chief conductors have been Janos Fürst (1980-1983), Peter Erös (1983-1989), Owain Arwel Hughes (1995-1999), Moshe Atzmon (1999-2002), Matthias Aeschbacher (2005-2011) Rumon Gamba (2011-2015), and since 2023, Joshua Weilerstein. Michael Schønwandt has had a long association with the orchestra and is currently its conductor emeritus.

In October 2022, the orchestra announced the appointment of Joshua Weilerstein as its next chief conductor, effective with the 2023-2024 season, with an initial contract of 3 seasons. Weilerstein had been previously scheduled to conclude his tenure with the orchestra at the close of his initial contract, but in August 2025, the orchestra announced a one-year extension of Weilerstein's contract as chief conductor, through the 2026-2027 season.

The orchestra's current administrative director is Rikke Mølgaard. The orchestra is the organiser of The Lauritz Melchior International Singing Competition and a co-organizer of the Aalborg Opera Festival.

== Chief conductors ==
- Jens Schrøder (1943–1979)
- Janos Fürst (1980–1983)
- Peter Erös (1983–1989)
- Owain Arwel Hughes (1995–1999)
- Moshe Atzmon (1999–2002)
- Matthias Aeschbacher (2005–2011)
- Rumon Gamba (2011–2015)
- Joshua Weilerstein (2023–present)
