= Alisa Weilerstein =

American cellist (born 1982)

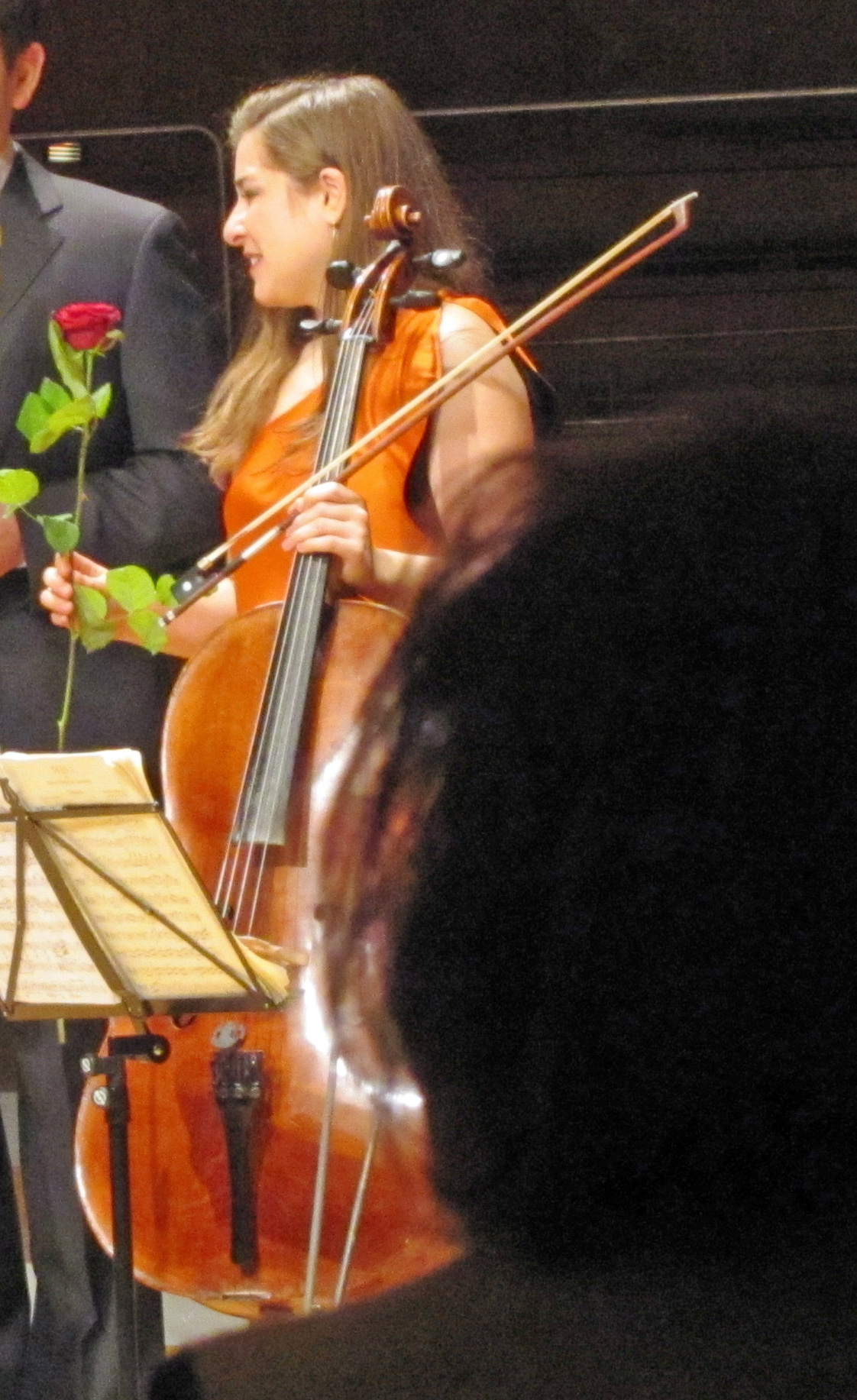
- Weilerstein in 2012

Background information
- Born: April 14, 1982 (age 43); Rochester, New York, US
- Genres: Classical
- Instrument: Cello
- Website: www.alisaweilerstein.com

Camille Saint-Saëns's "Le cygne" (The Swan) (2:56)
Weilerstein and Jason Yoder (marimba) perform Camille Saint-Saëns's "Le cygne" (The Swan) from The Carnival of the Animals at the White House Evening of Classical Music (November 2009)

Audio only

Alisa Weilerstein (born April 14, 1982) is an American classical cellist. She was named a 2011 MacArthur Fellow.

== Life and career ==
Weilerstein was born in Rochester, New York. to a secular Jewish family. She started playing the cello at age four. She made her debut at age 13 with the Cleveland Orchestra playing Tchaikovsky's Variations on a Rococo Theme. As a soloist she has performed with major orchestras on four continents. She also is active in chamber music and performs with her parents, violinist Donald Weilerstein (the founding first violinist of the Cleveland Quartet) and pianist Vivian Hornik Weilerstein, as the Weilerstein Trio. The trio currently resides at the New England Conservatory in Boston. Her brother is the violinist and conductor Joshua Weilerstein (born in 1987). She is married to Venezuelan conductor Rafael Payare.

Weilerstein has received a number of honors. In 2000–01, she won an Avery Fisher Career Grant and was selected to play in the ECHO "Rising Stars" program and Chamber Music Society II, the young artists' program of the Chamber Music Society of Lincoln Center. In 2004 she graduated from Columbia University in New York City with a BA in Russian history. In 2006 she was awarded the Leonard Bernstein Prize at the Schleswig-Holstein Music Festival. In 2011 she received a MacArthur Foundation "genius grant".

A champion of contemporary music, Weilerstein has worked extensively with composers Osvaldo Golijov, Lera Auerbach and Joseph Hallman. She performed the New York premiere of Golijov's Cello Concerto "Azul" at Lincoln Center's Mostly Mozart Festival, the world premiere of Auerbach's 24 Preludes for Cello and Piano at the Caramoor International Music Festival, Auerbach's transcription of Shostakovich Op. 34 for Cello and Piano at the Schleswig-Holstein Musik Festival, and Hallman's Cello Concerto with the Saint Petersburg Philharmonic Orchestra.

In May 2016, she premièred Outscape, Pascal Dusapin's second cello concerto, with the Chicago Symphony Orchestra, to positive critical reception.

In March 2017, at Symphony Hall, she performed the world premiere of Matthias Pintscher's concerto for cello and orchestra "un despertar" with the Boston Symphony Orchestra to critical acclaim. She plays a 1730 Domenico Montagnana cello.

Since 2013, she has been married to Venezuelan conductor Rafael Payare. They have two daughters.

In 2023, she began a six-chapter series of concerts called "FRAGMENTS," multisensory solo cello productions combining 27 new commissions with Bach’s solo cello suites.

== Discography ==
- The Recovery of Paradise: Blackford Cello Concerto with Czech Philharmonic and Tomáš Netopil, PENTATONE, 2025
- Brahms Cello Sonatas with Inon Barnatan, PENTATONE, 2024
- Beethoven Cello Sonatas, PENTATONE, 2022
- Bach Cello Suites, PENTATONE, 2020
- Old Souls – Chamber Music for Flute and Strings with Gili Schwarzman, Guy Braunstein, Amihai Grosz, Susanna Yoko Henkel (Antonín Dvořák, Ludwig van Beethoven, Hugo Wolf, Fritz Kreisler) PENTATONE, 2019
- Transfigured Night Haydn/Schoenberg, PENTATONE, 2018
- Works for Cello and Piano (with Vivian Hornik Weilerstein), EMI Classics “Debut” Series
- Dvořák Trios (with the Weilerstein Trio: Donald Weilerstein, violin; Alisa Weilerstein, cello; Vivian Hornik Weilerstein, piano), Koch International Classics
- Joseph Hallman: Cello Concerto (St. Petersburg) — with the St. Petersburg Chamber Philharmonic, Jeffery Meyer (conductor), jhallmanmusic label
- Dvořák: Cello Concerto — with the Czech Philharmonic Orchestra, Jiří Bělohlávek (conductor), Decca
- Elgar: Cello Concerto, Carter: Cello Concerto, Bruch: Kol Nidrei — with the Staatskapelle Berlin, Daniel Barenboim (conductor), Decca
- Solo - works by Kodály, Golijov, Cassadó, and Bright Sheng, Decca

== Media ==
Luigi Boccherini's Sonata for Two Cellos in C Major – 1. Allegro moderato (3:18)
Weilerstein and Sujari Britt perform Luigi Boccherini's Sonata for Two Cellos in C major – 1. Allegro moderato at the White House Evening of Classical Music (November 2009)

Audio only version

Piano Trio No. 1 in D minor, Op. 49 – 4. Finale, Allegro assai appassionato (8:08)
Joshua Bell, Awadagin Pratt, and Weilerstein perform Felix Mendelssohn's Piano Trio No. 1 in D minor, Op. 49 – 4. Finale: Allegro assai appassionato, at the White House Evening of Classical Music (November 2009)

Audio only version
