= Erik Bach =

Danish composer and writer on music

Erik Bach (born 5 January 1946) is a Danish composer and writer on music. Born in the small rural town of Mariager, Bach took his diploma in music theory and music history from the Royal Academy of Music in Aarhus. As a composer, he claims the influence of Peter Maxwell Davies and other postmodernists.

From 1992 to 2001, he served as the principal of the Royal Academy of Music in Aarhus. In 2002-03 he took a degree in music technology at Aalborg University.
