= Joshua Weilerstein =

American conductor and violinist (born 1987)

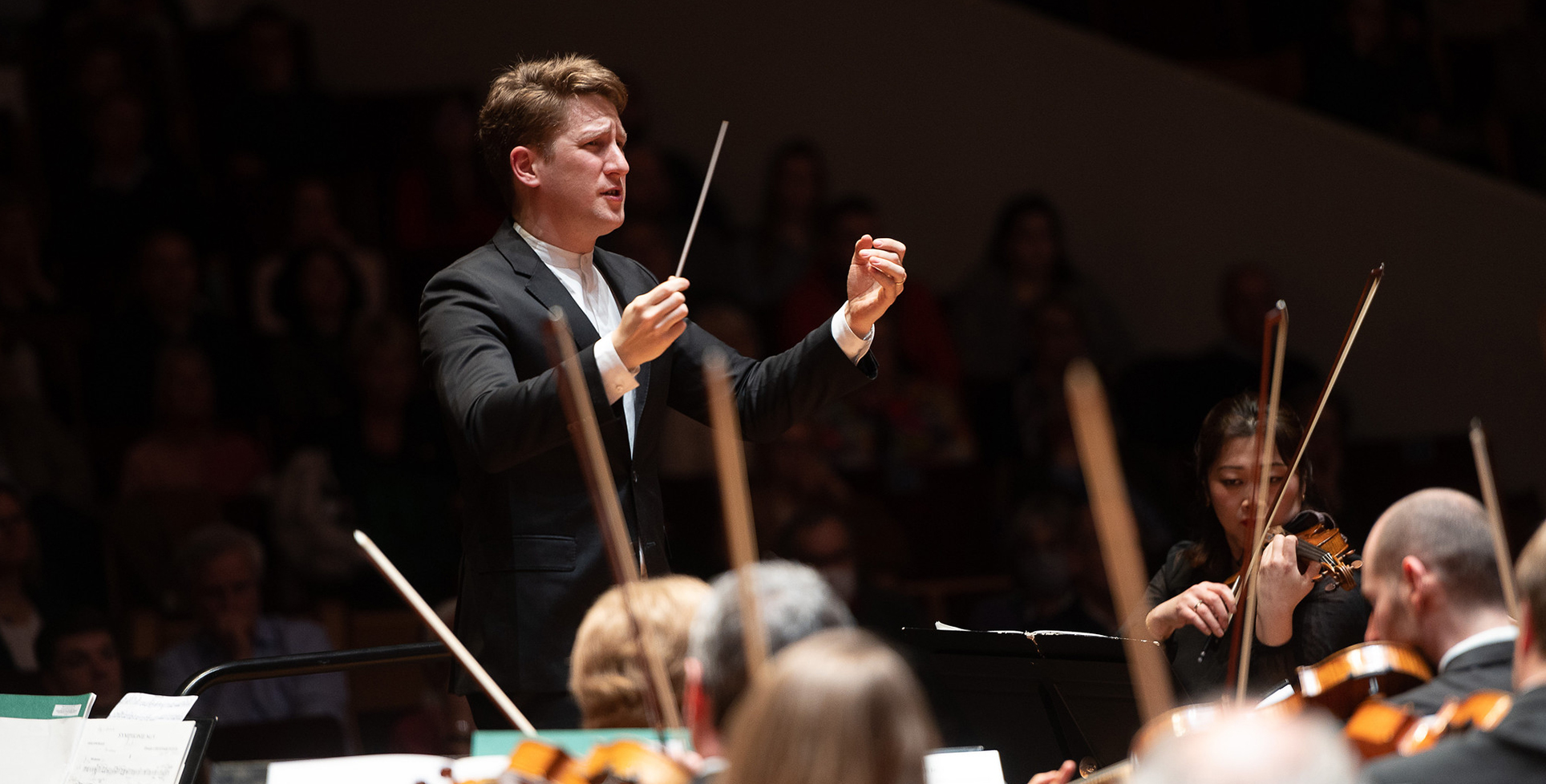
Joshua Weilerstein in 2024

Joshua Weilerstein (born 1987) is an American conductor and violinist.

== Biography ==
Born in Rochester, New York to a musical family, Weilerstein is the son of violinist Donald Weilerstein (founding first violinist of the Cleveland Quartet) and pianist Vivian Hornik Weilerstein. His sister is the cellist Alisa Weilerstein. Weilerstein learnt the violin as a youth, and played with the Boston Philharmonic Youth Orchestra. He studied violin and conducting at the New England Conservatory of Music, from which he earned his master's degree. His conducting mentors have included Hugh Wolff.

At the 2009 Malko Competition for Young Conductors in Copenhagen, Weilerstein won the First Prize and the Audience Prize, then the youngest first prize winner in the history of the competition. He became a Dudamel conducting fellow with the Los Angeles Philharmonic in 2011. He served as assistant conductor of the New York Philharmonic from 2012 to 2015. Weilerstein was artistic director of the Orchestre de Chambre de Lausanne from 2015 to 2021. Weilerstein initiated a classical music podcast, 'Sticky Notes', in 2017.

Weilerstein first guest-conducted the Aalborg Symphony Orchestra in 2011. In October 2022, the orchestra announced the appointment of Weilerstein as its next chief conductor, effective with the 2023–2024 season, with an initial contract of 3 seasons. Weilerstein had been previously scheduled to conclude his Aalborg tenure at the close of his initial contract, but in August 2025, the Aalborg Symphony Orchestra announced a one-year extension of his contract as chief conductor through the 2026–2027 season.

In October 2023, the Orchestre national de Lille announced the appointment of Weilerstein as its next music director, effective September 2024. In November 2026, the BBC Philharmonic announced the appointment of Weilerstein as its next chief conductor, effective in September 2028, with an initial contract of five years.

Cultural offices
| Preceded by Christian Zacharias | Artistic Director, Orchestre de Chambre de Lausanne; 2015–2021 | Succeeded by Renaud Capuçon |
| Preceded by Rumon Gamba | Chief Conductor, Aalborg Symphony Orchestra; 2023–present | Succeeded by incumbent |
| Preceded by Alexandre Bloch | Music Director, Orchestre national de Lille; 2024–present | Succeeded by incumbent |
