= Royal Academy of Music, Aarhus/Aalborg =

Music school in Denmark

Royal Academy of Music
- Det Jyske Musikkonservatorium
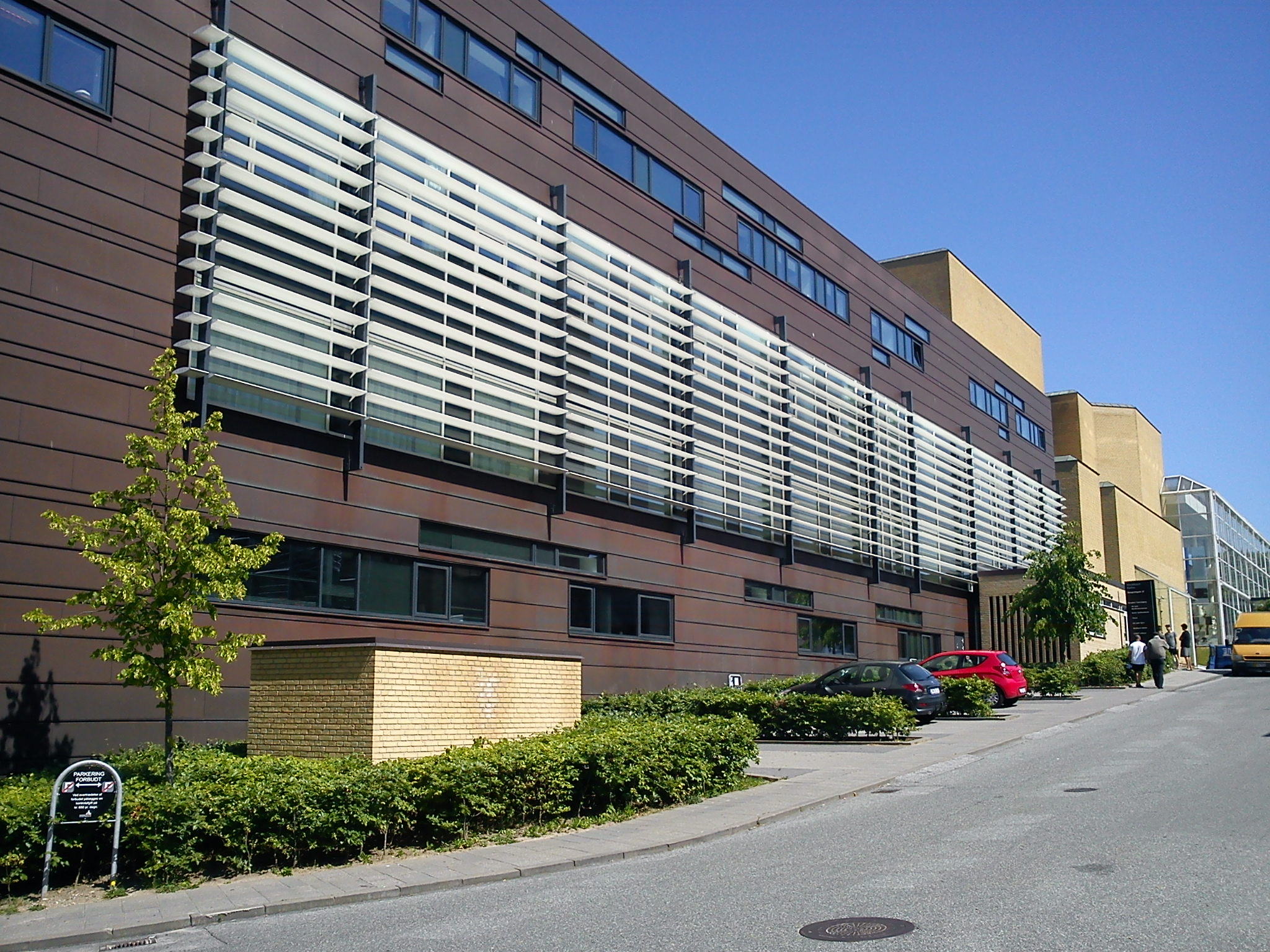
- The Royal Academy of Music in Aarhus.
- Type: Music school
- Established: 1927; 99 years ago
- Rector: Claus Olesen (2020)
- Administrative staff: 200
- Students: 350
- Location: Aarhus and Aalborg, Denmark
- Website: http://www.musikkons.dk

The Royal Academy of Music (Danish: Det Jyske Musikkonservatorium) in Aarhus and Aalborg, Denmark, is a conservatoire and state institution under the auspices of the Danish Ministry of Culture, charged with responsibility for the further education courses in music, and for otherwise contributing to the promotion of musical culture in Denmark. The school is under the patronage of King Frederik X.

The headquarters of the Royal Academy of Music is situated in Aarhus, in a building designed by architectural firm C. F. Møller Architects, completed in 2007. It was built as an extension of Musikhuset Aarhus, the Aarhus Concert Hall.

The new headquarters for the Royal Academy of Music, North Denmark in Aalborg was completed in 2014 and is called Musikkens Hus. It was partially designed by the Scandinavian branch of architectural firm Coop Himmelb(l)au.

== Programmes ==
Royal Academy of Music offers graduate level studies in areas such as music teaching, and solo and professional musicianship.

The programmes have been given the highest status, both nationally and internationally. This means that they measure up to the best comparable courses on offer abroad. The programmes aim to train students for careers as professional musicians, and, depending on the course taken, students graduate either as solo performers or as music teachers.

The emphasis of the teaching is on solo work with an instrument or the voice, but there is also ensemble playing and a number of supplementary subjects. For those studying to become music teachers, particular importance is attached to music pedagogy and communicative subjects.

== Notable alumni ==
- Erik Bach (b. 1946), music theory, music history, composer and former principal of the academy (1992-2001)
- Erling Møldrup (1943-2016), music history, classical guitar and former teacher at the academy
- Venla Ilona Blom (b.1985), Finnish beatboxer, co-founder of Tuuletar
