= Saint Margaret Shrine =

- Saint Margaret Shrine
- 41.1922°N 73.2158°W
- Location: Bridgeport, Connecticut
- Address: 2523 Park Avenue
- Country: United States
- Denomination: Catholic Church
- Website: stmargaretshrine.org

History
- Former name(s): Saint Raphael's Church; Columbus Park
- Founded: 1942
- Founder: Rev. Emilio Lasiello
- Dedication: Margaret the Virgin

Administration
- Diocese: Roman Catholic Diocese of Bridgeport

Saint Margaret Shrine is a Roman Catholic shrine and church in Bridgeport, Connecticut, part of the Diocese of Bridgeport. The Shrine has a veterans' memorial in addition to Catholic art.

== History ==
Saint Margaret Shrine was built by Rev. Emilio Lasiello in response to the 1941 Attack on Pearl Harbor. The Shrine also features a Padre Pio Chapel.

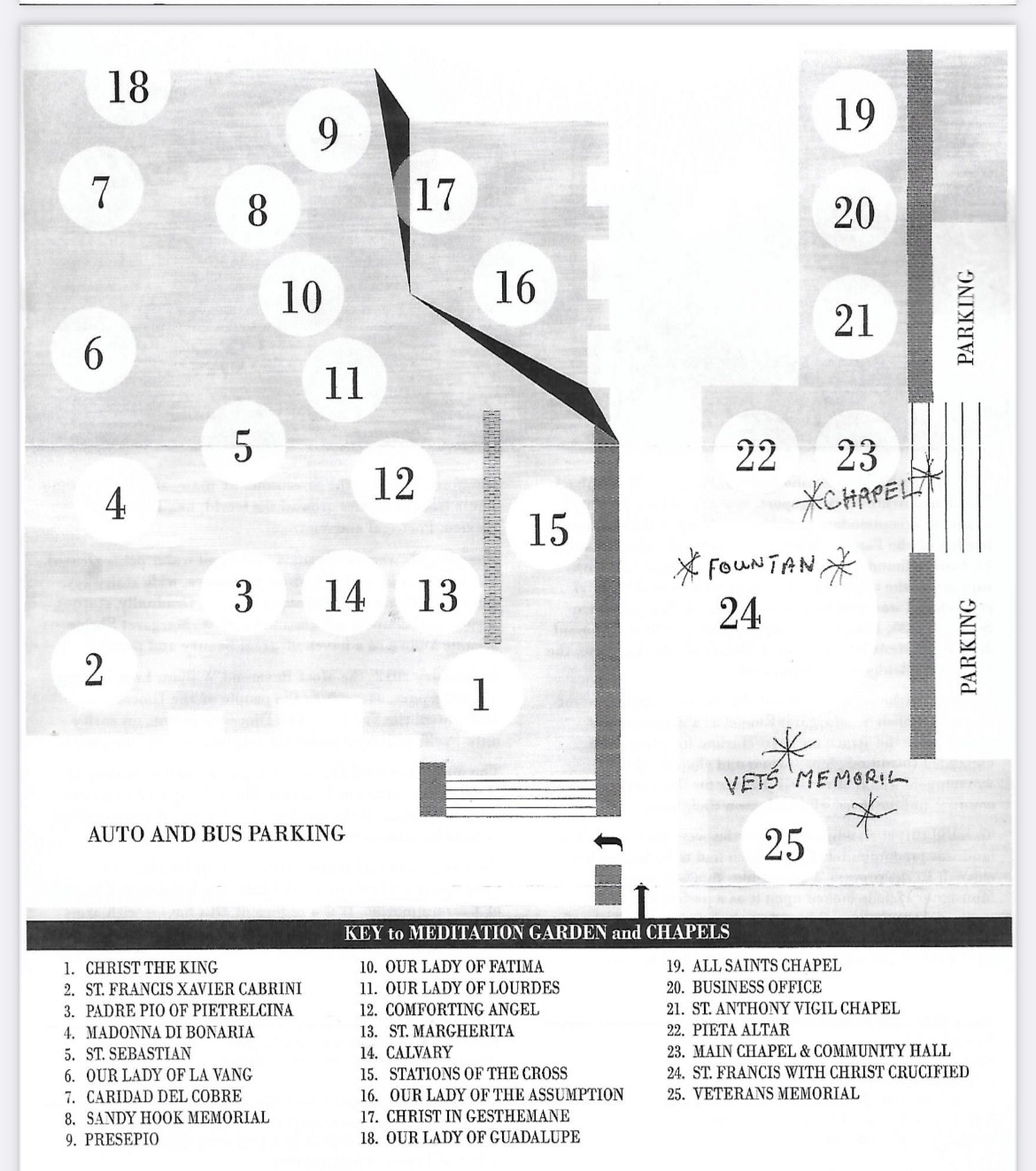

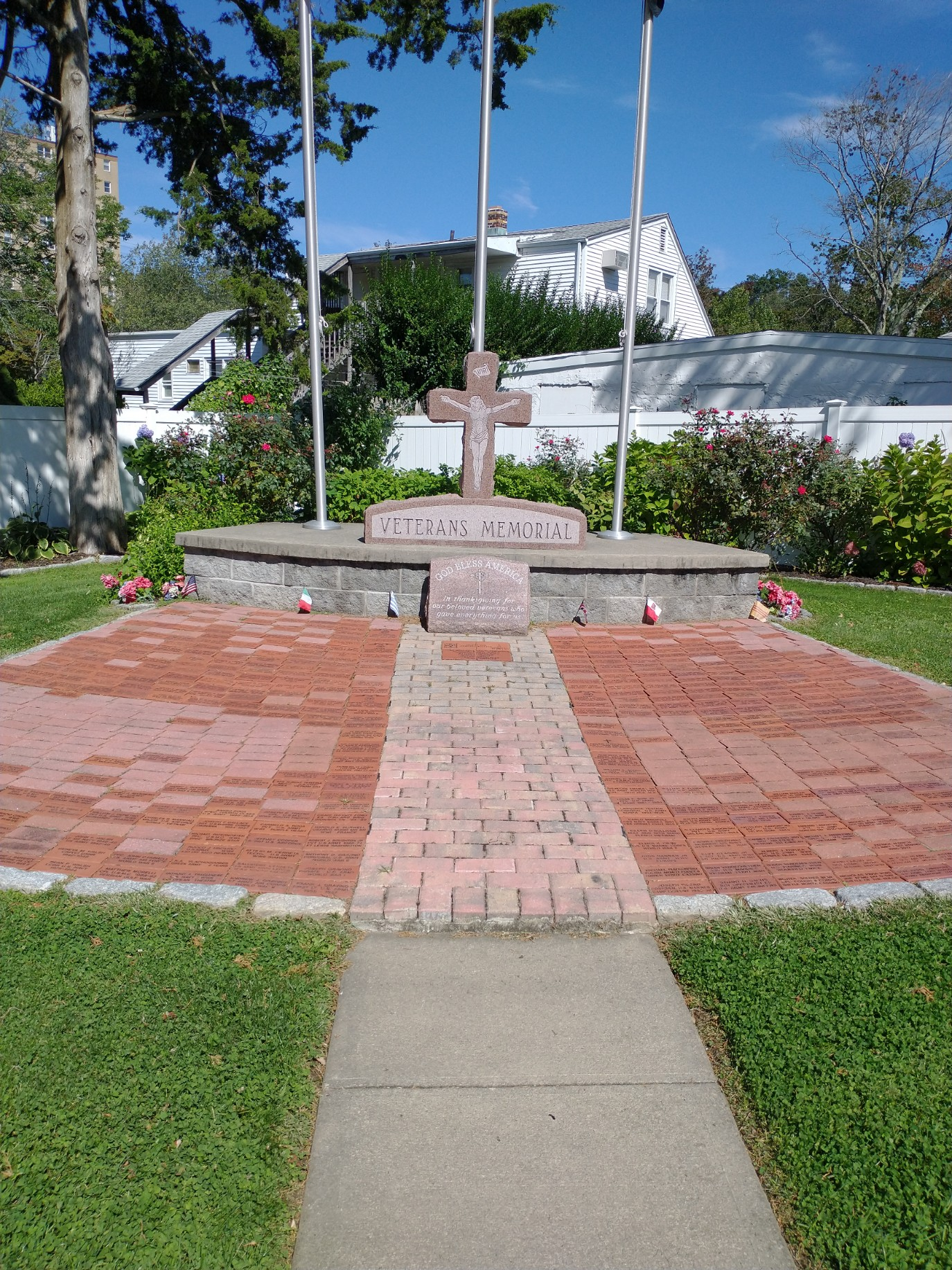
