= Margaret the Virgin =

Saint (275–304) usually shown with a dragon

Saint Margaret of Antioch (Saint Marina the Great Martyr)
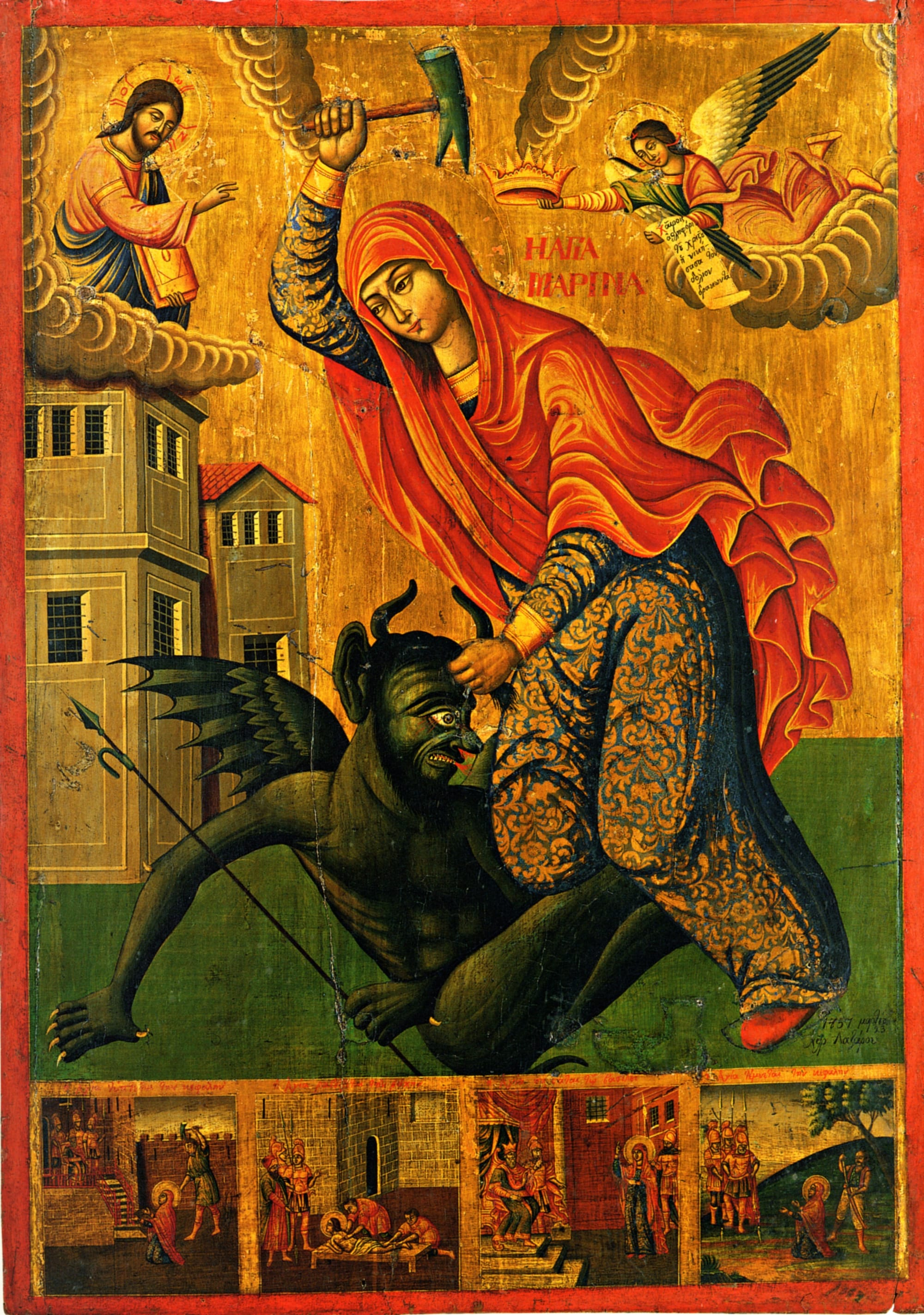
- Saint Marina the Great Martyr. An icon written by Lazaros depicting her beating a demon with a hammer (1857)

Virgin-Martyr and Vanquisher of Demons
- Born: c. 289; Antioch of Pisidia (modern-day Yalvaç, Isparta, Turkey)
- Died: c. 304 (age 15)
- Feast: 20 July (Roman Catholic Church, Most of Anglicanism, Western Rite Orthodoxy) 17 July (Byzantine Christianity); Epip 23 (Coptic Orthodox Church of Alexandria) (Martyrdom) Hathor 23 (Coptic Orthodox Church of Alexandria) (Consecration of her Church)
- Attributes: slaying a dragon (Western depictions) hammer, defeated demon (Eastern Orthodox depictions)
- Patronage: pregnant women, nurses, peasants, exiles, the falsely accused, the dying, kidney disease, Lowestoft, Queens' College, Cambridge, Sannat and Cospicua

Margaret, known as Margaret of Antioch in the West, and as Saint Marina the Great Martyr (Ancient Greek: Ἁγία Μαρίνα) in the East, is celebrated as a saint on 20 July in Western Christianity, on 30th of July (Julian calendar) by the Eastern Orthodox Church, and on Epip 23 and Hathor 23 in the Coptic Orthodox Church. The teenage Margaret is said to have been tortured and beheaded when she refused to renounce Christianity and give her virginity to a Roman official in the 4th century. She was reputed to have promised very powerful indulgences to those who wrote or read her life or invoked her intercessions; these no doubt helped the spread of her following. Margaret is one of the Fourteen Holy Helpers in Roman Catholic tradition.

== Hagiography ==
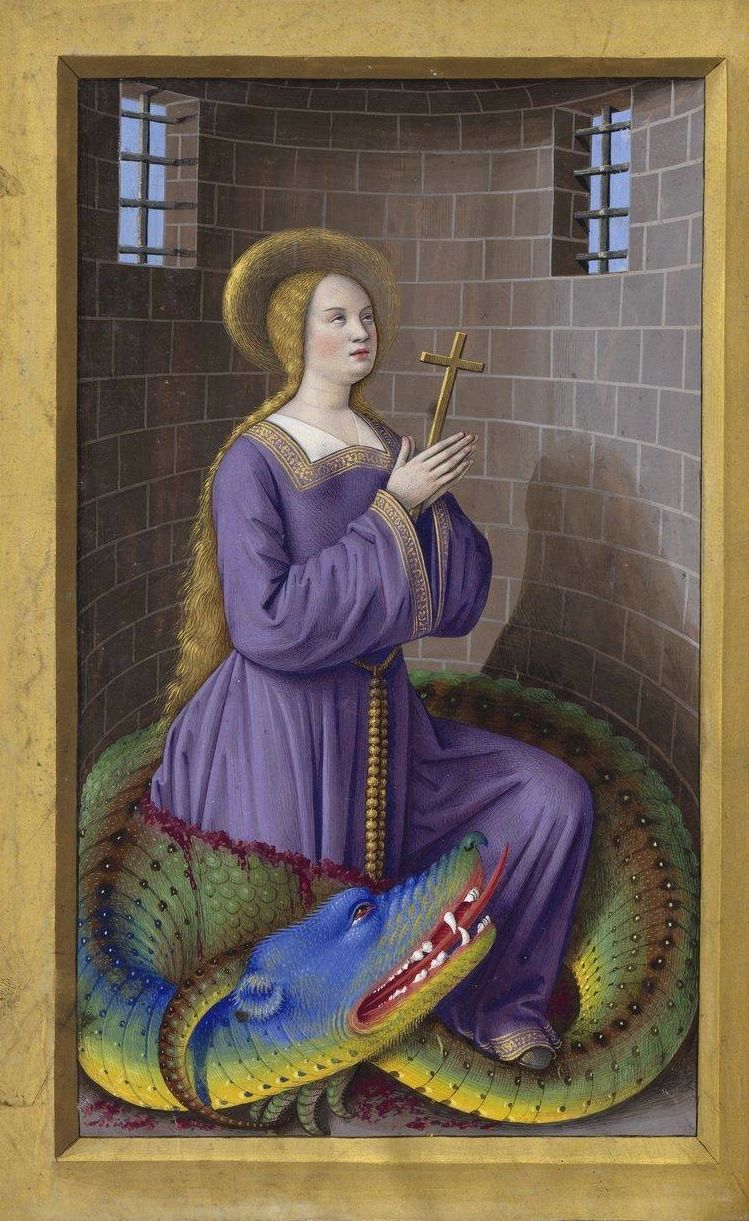
The miraculous emergence of St. Margaret from the belly of the dragon as depicted in the Grandes Heures of Anne of Brittany, produced 1503 to 1508.

According to a 9th-century martyrology of Rabanus Maurus, Margaret suffered at Antioch in Pisidia (in what is now Turkey) in c. 304, during the Diocletianic Persecution. She was the daughter of a pagan priest named Aedesius. Her mother having died soon after her birth, Margaret was nursed by a Christian woman five or six leagues (15 to 18 miles (24 to 29 km)) from Antioch. Having embraced Christianity and consecrated her virginity to God, Margaret was disowned by her father, adopted by her nurse, and lived in the country keeping sheep with her foster mother.

Olybrius, Governor of the Roman Diocese of the East, asked to marry her, with the demand that she renounce Christianity. Upon her refusal she was cruelly tortured, during which various miraculous incidents are reported to have occurred. One of these involved being swallowed by Satan in the shape of a dragon, from which she escaped alive when the cross she carried irritated the dragon's innards. Eventually, she was decapitated.

== Historicity ==
According to the Encyclopædia Britannica, Margaret's story is "generally regarded to be fictitious". The Catholic Encyclopedia states "even the century to which she belonged is uncertain".

Doubts about her story are not new: by the Middle Ages, hagiographer Jacobus de Voragine (author of the well-known Golden Legend) considered her martyrology to be too fantastic and remarked that the part where she is eaten by the dragon was to be considered a legend.

== Veneration ==
The Greek Marina came from Antioch in Pisidia (as opposed to Antioch of Syria), but this distinction was lost in the West. From the east her veneration spread towards England, France, and Germany, in the 11th century during the Crusades.

In 1222, the Council of Oxford added her to the list of feast days, and so her cult acquired great popularity. Many versions of the story were told in 13th-century England, in Anglo-Norman (including one ascribed to Nicholas Bozon), English, and Latin, and more than 250 churches are dedicated to her in England, most famously, St. Margaret's, Westminster, the parish church of the British Houses of Parliament in London. There is also a Saint Margaret Shrine in Bridgeport, Connecticut.

=== Feast day ===
She is recognised as a saint by the Catholic Church, being listed as such in the Roman Martyrology for 20 July. She was also included from the 12th to the 20th century among the saints to be commemorated wherever the Roman Rite was celebrated, but was then removed from the general calendar along with other European saints through the apostolic letter Mysterii Paschalis.

The Eastern Orthodox Church knows Margaret as Saint Marina, and celebrates her feast day on 17 July. Margaret is remembered in the Church of England with a commemoration on 20 July.

Every year on Epip 23 the Coptic Orthodox church celebrates her martyrdom day, and on Hathor 23 the church celebrates the dedication of a church to her name. Saint Mary church in Cairo holds a relic believed to be Margaret's right hand, previously moved from the Angel Michael Church (modernly known as Haret Al Gawayna) following its destruction in the 13th century CE.

In 2022, Margaret was officially added to the Episcopal Church liturgical calendar with a feast day she shares with Catherine of Alexandria and Barbara of Nicomedia on 24 November.

=== Patronage ===
Margaret of Antioch is a patroness of pregnant women, servant maids, kidney-sufferers, and against diabolical infestations.

== Iconography ==
In art, she is often represented as a shepherdess, or pictured escaping from, or standing above, a dragon. While Western iconography typically depicts St. Margaret emerging from the dragon, Eastern Byzantine iconography tends to focus on her battle with the demon in her cell and depicts her grabbing him by his hair and swinging a copper hammer at his face.

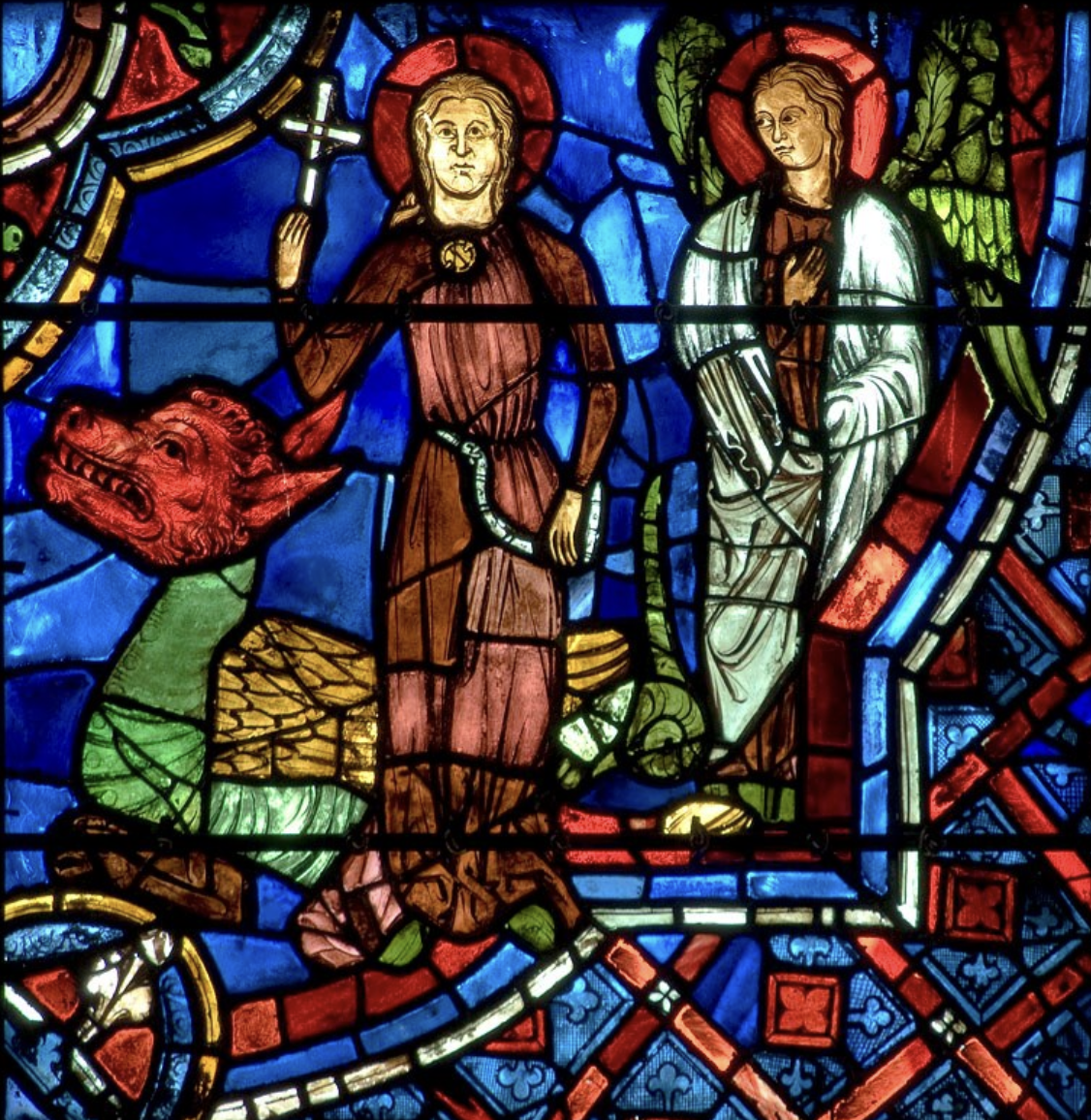
St. Margaret of Antioch, Chartres Cathedral (12-13c.)

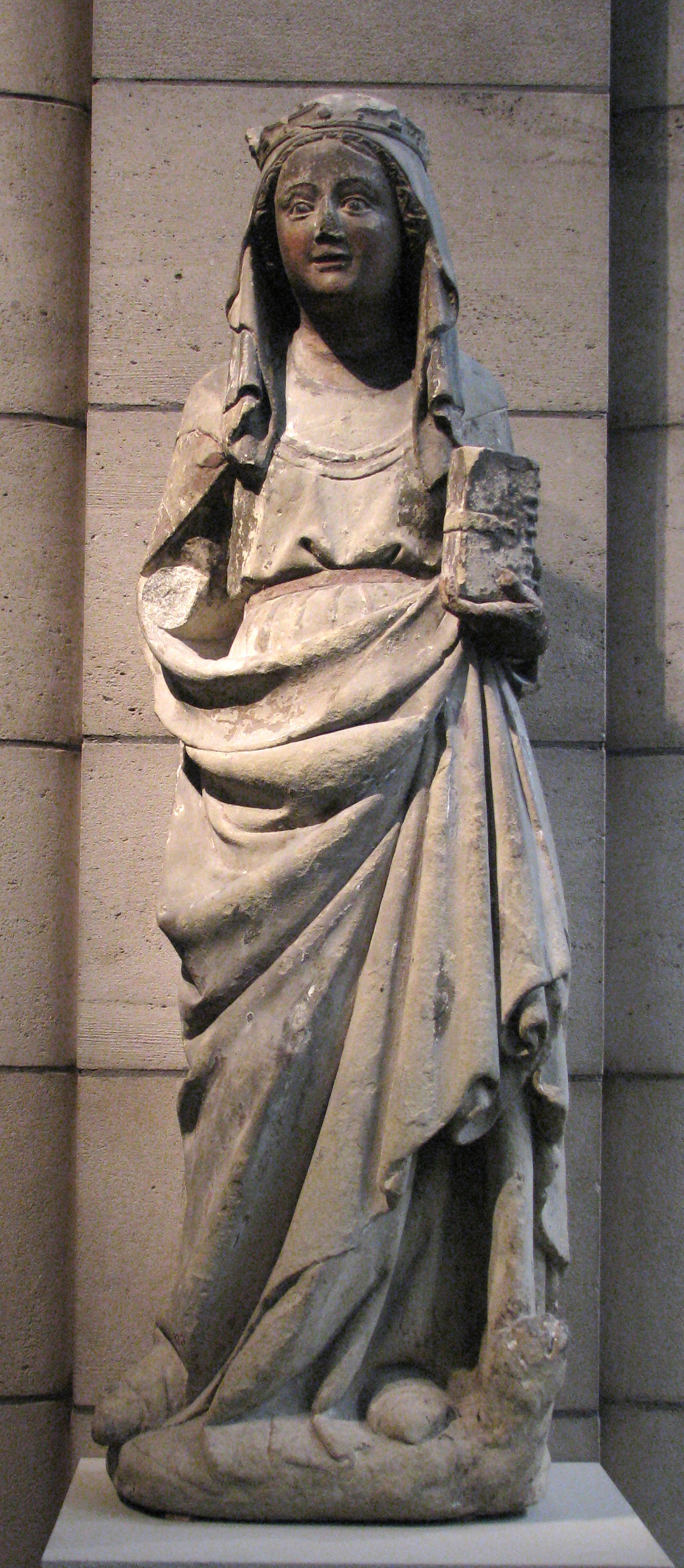
Saint Margaret of Antioch, limestone with paint and gilding, Burgos (c. 1275–1325)

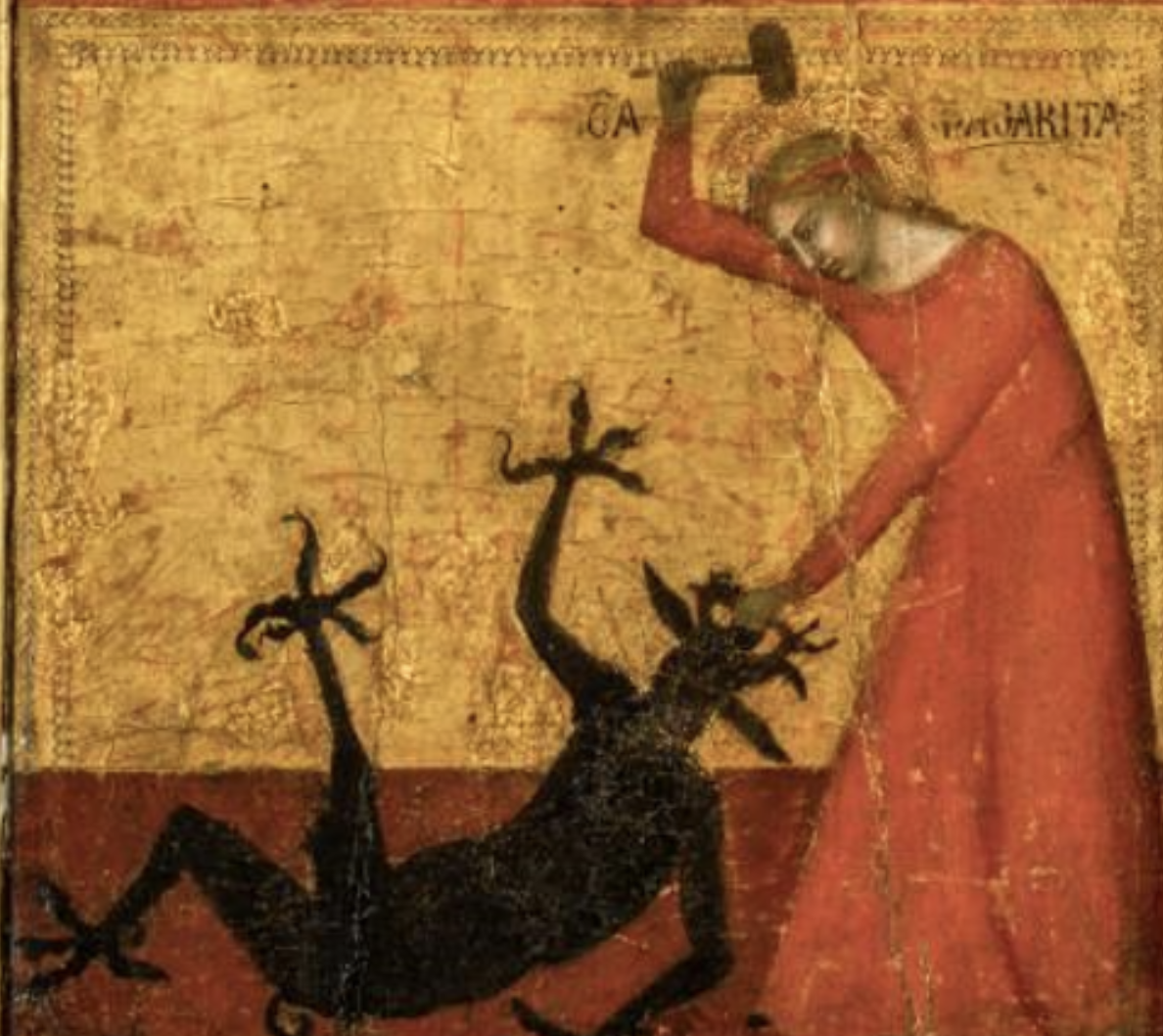
Barna da Siena, The Mystic Marriage of Saint Catherine (1340)

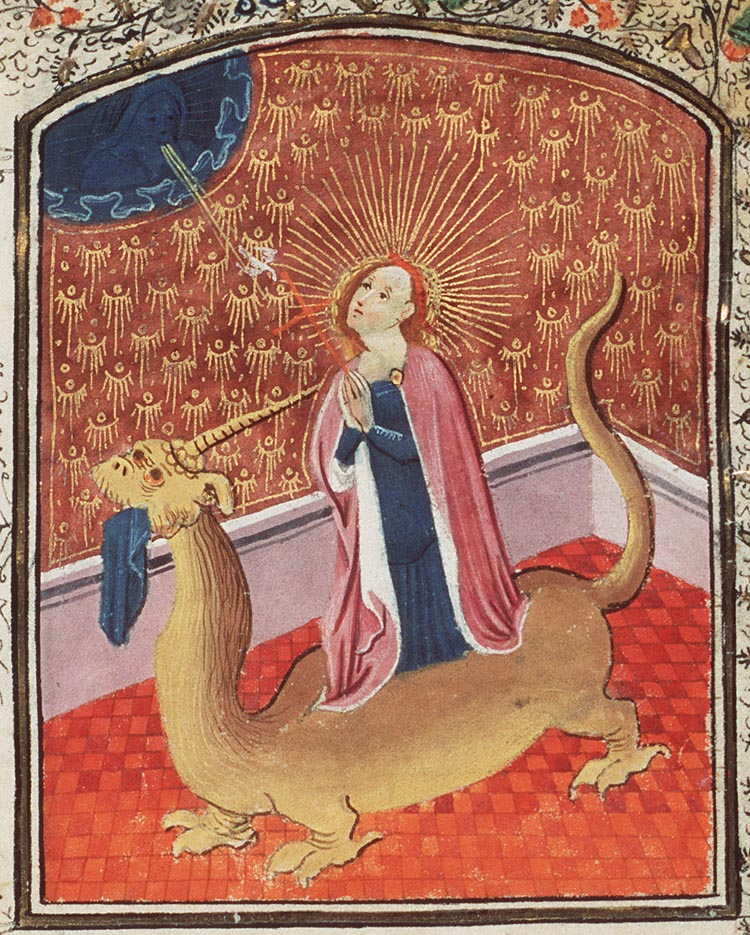
Vie de Sainte Marguerite (1460-1499)

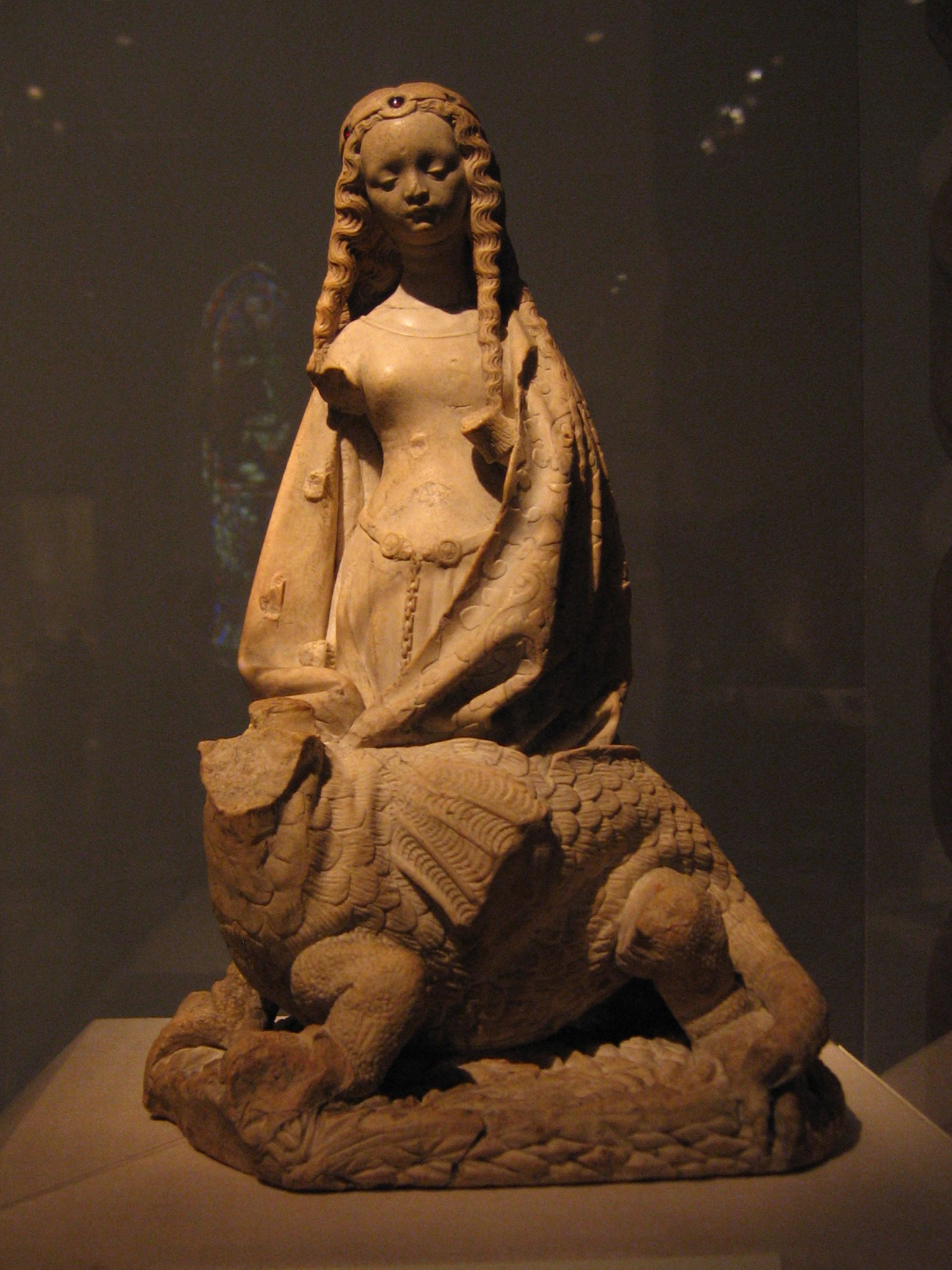
Saint Margaret and the Dragon, alabaster with traces of gilding, Toulouse (c. 1475)

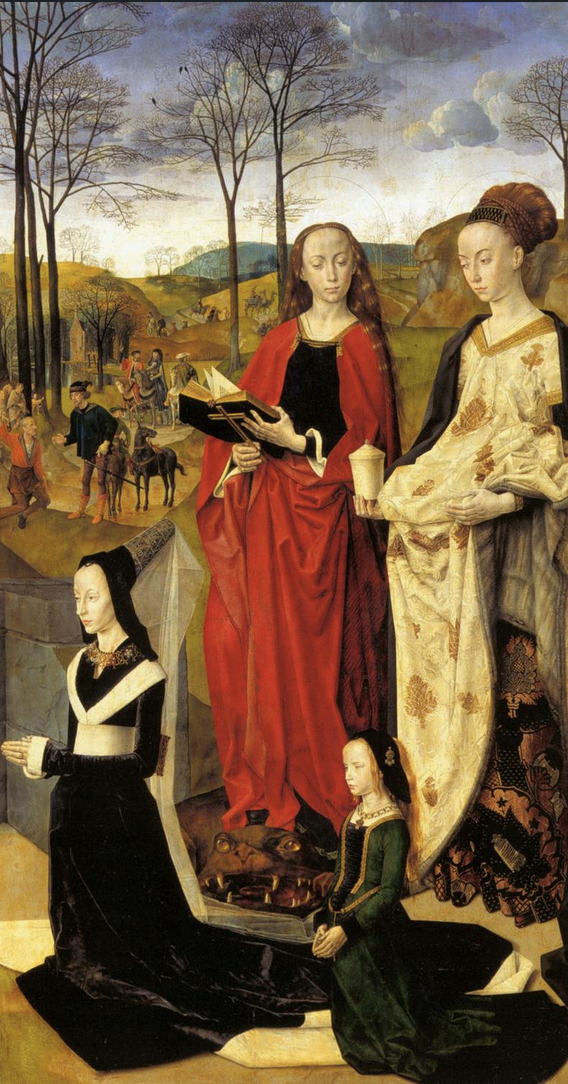
Hugo van der Goes, The Portinari Altarpiece, St. Mary Magdalene and St. Margaret with Maria Baroncelli and Daughter Margherita Portinari (detail), (1475)

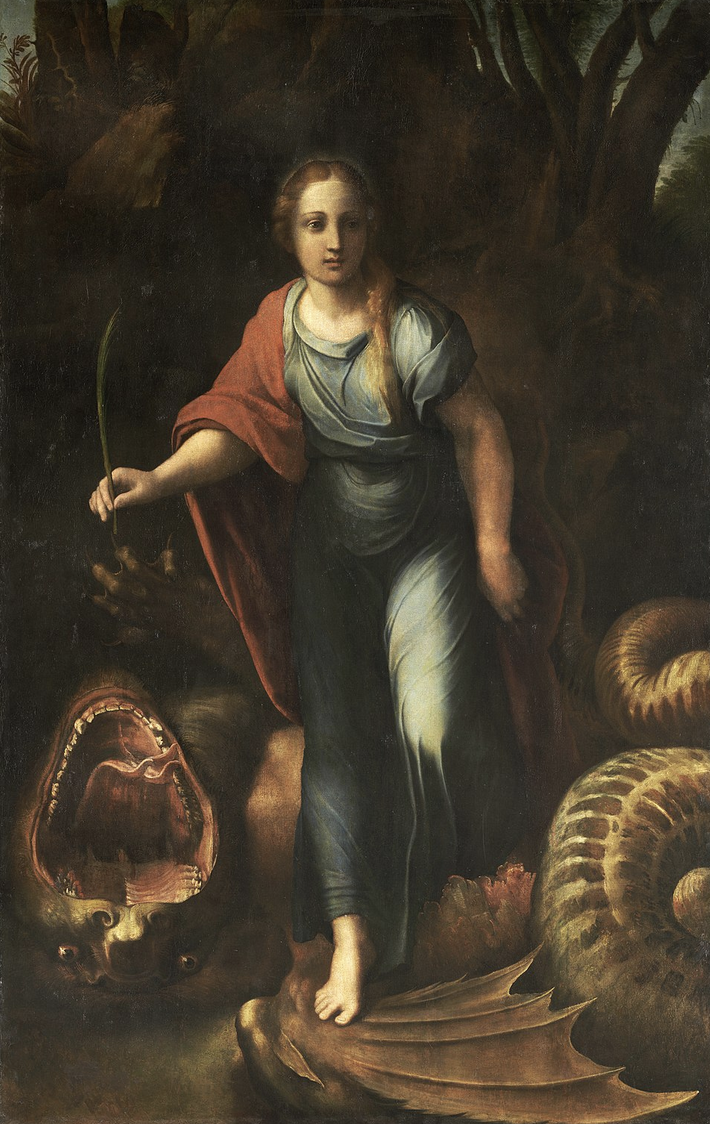
Raphael, Saint Margaret and the Dragon (1518)

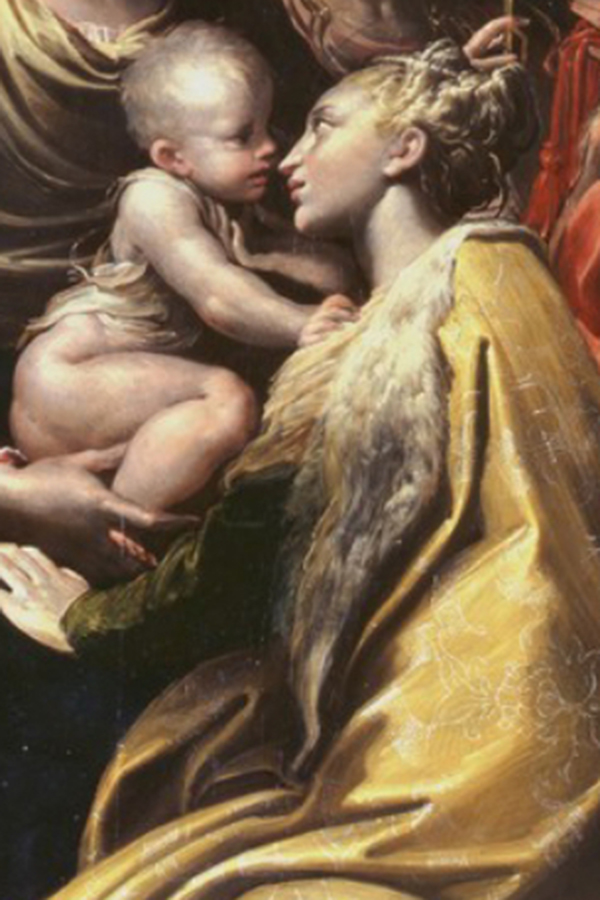
Parmigianino, Madonna and Child with Saints Margaret, Jerome, Petronius and Michael (detail of St. Margaret of Antioch) (1529)

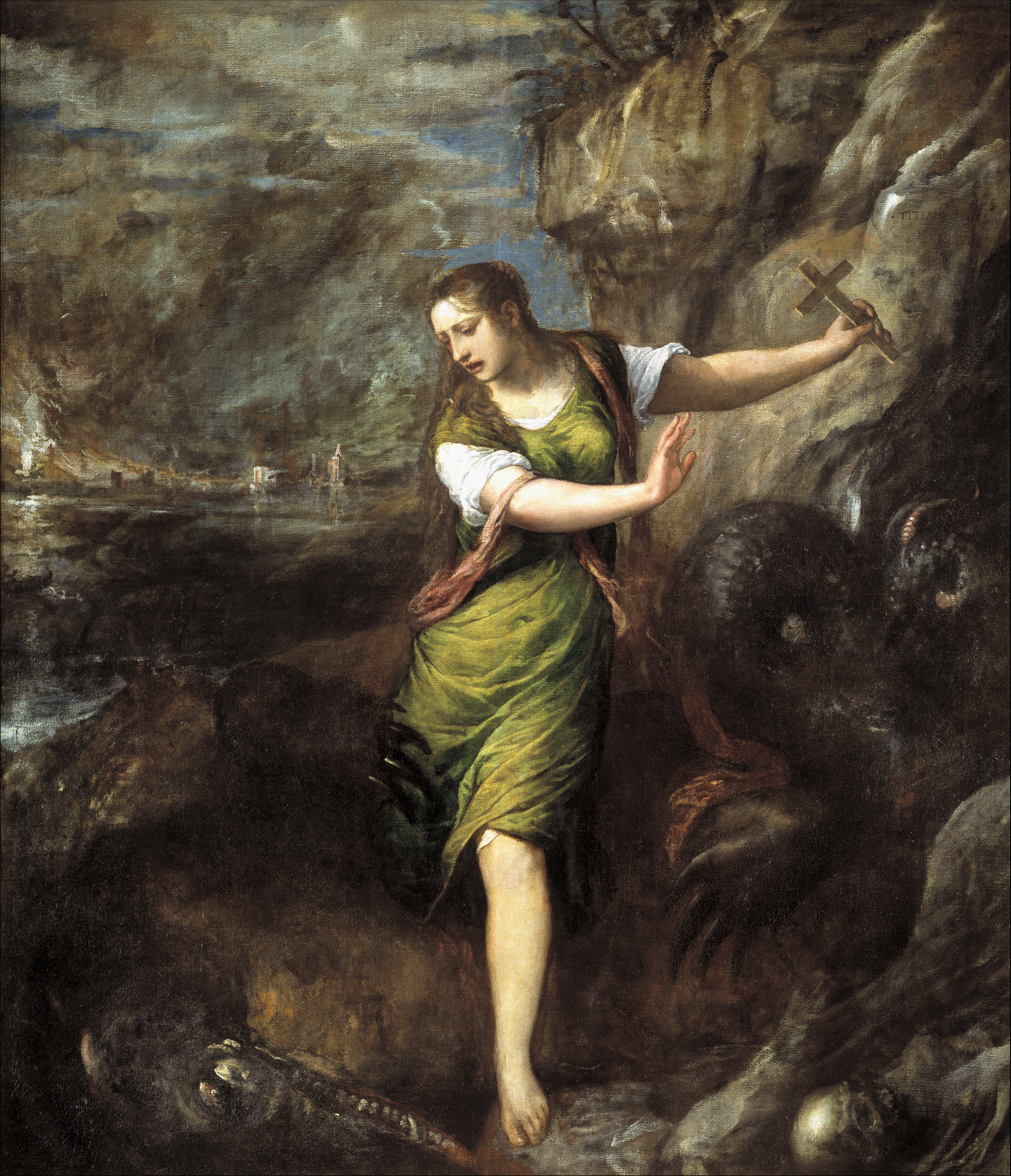
Titian, Saint Margaret and the Dragon (1559)

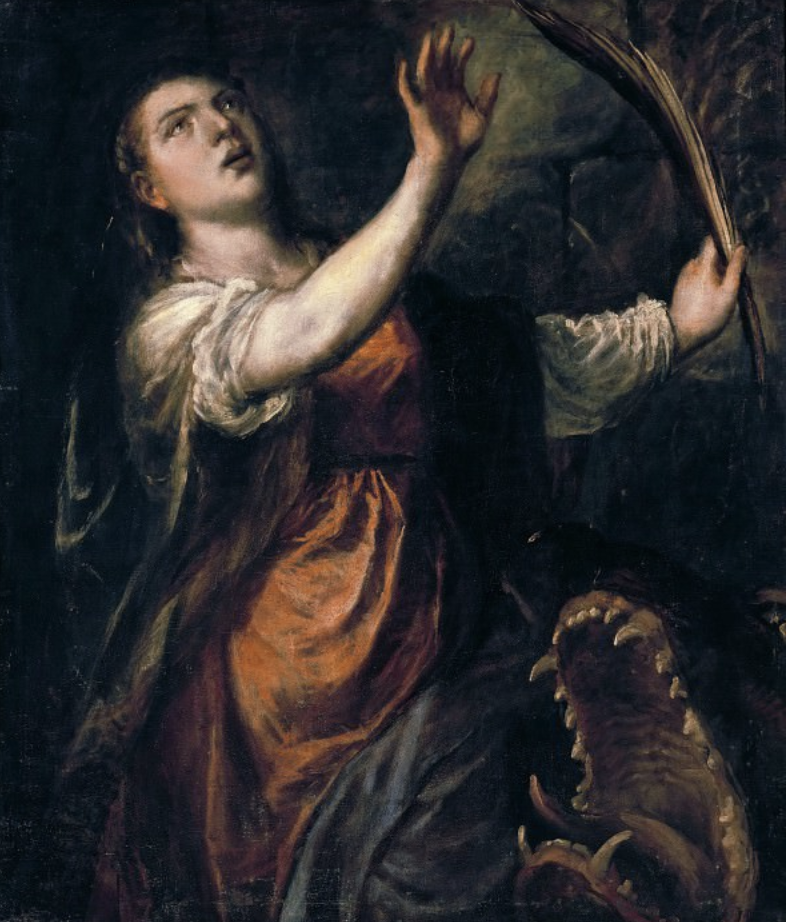
Titian, Saint Margaret and the Dragon (1565)

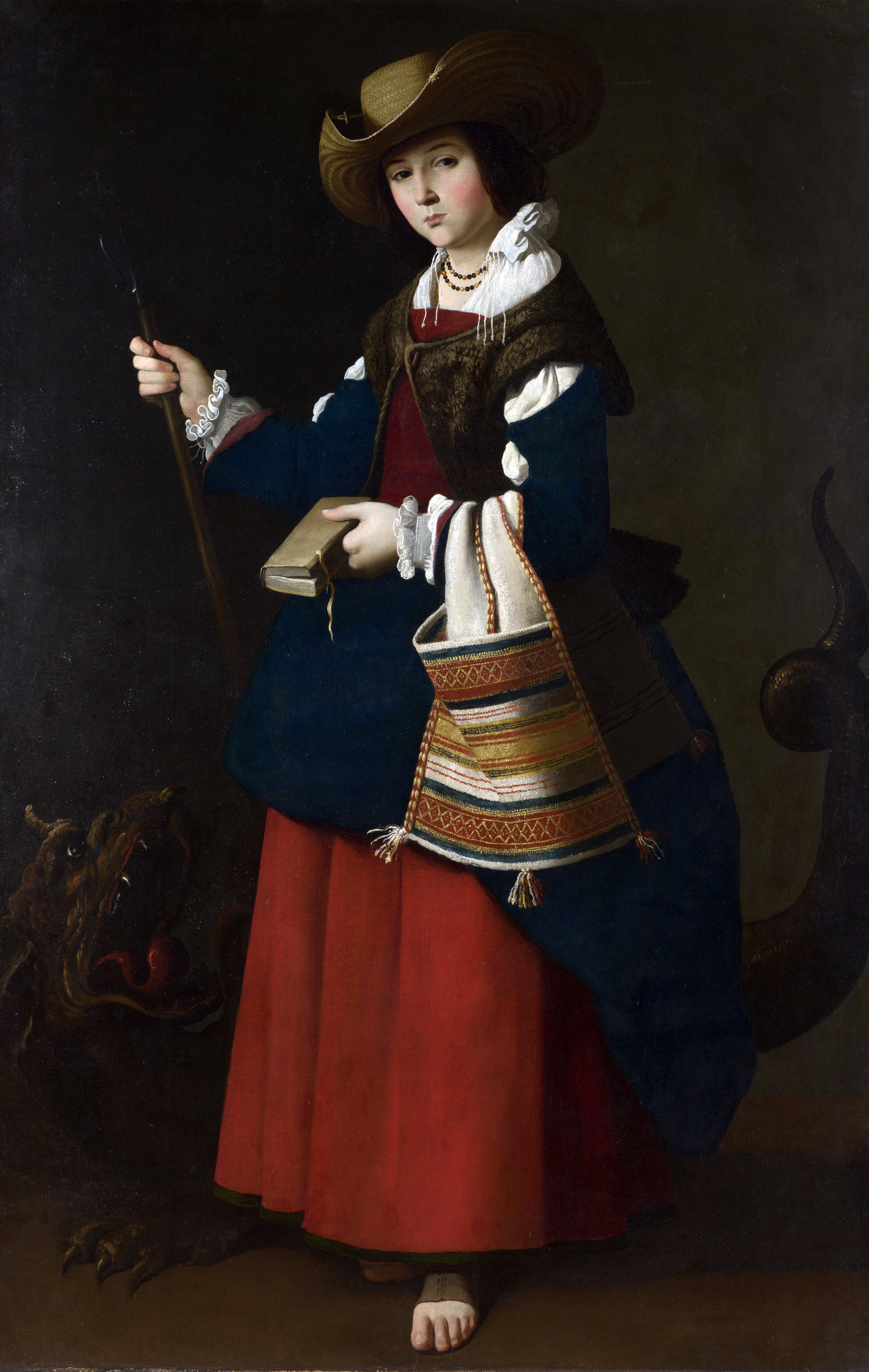
Francisco de Zurbarán, Saint Margaret as a shepherdess (1631)

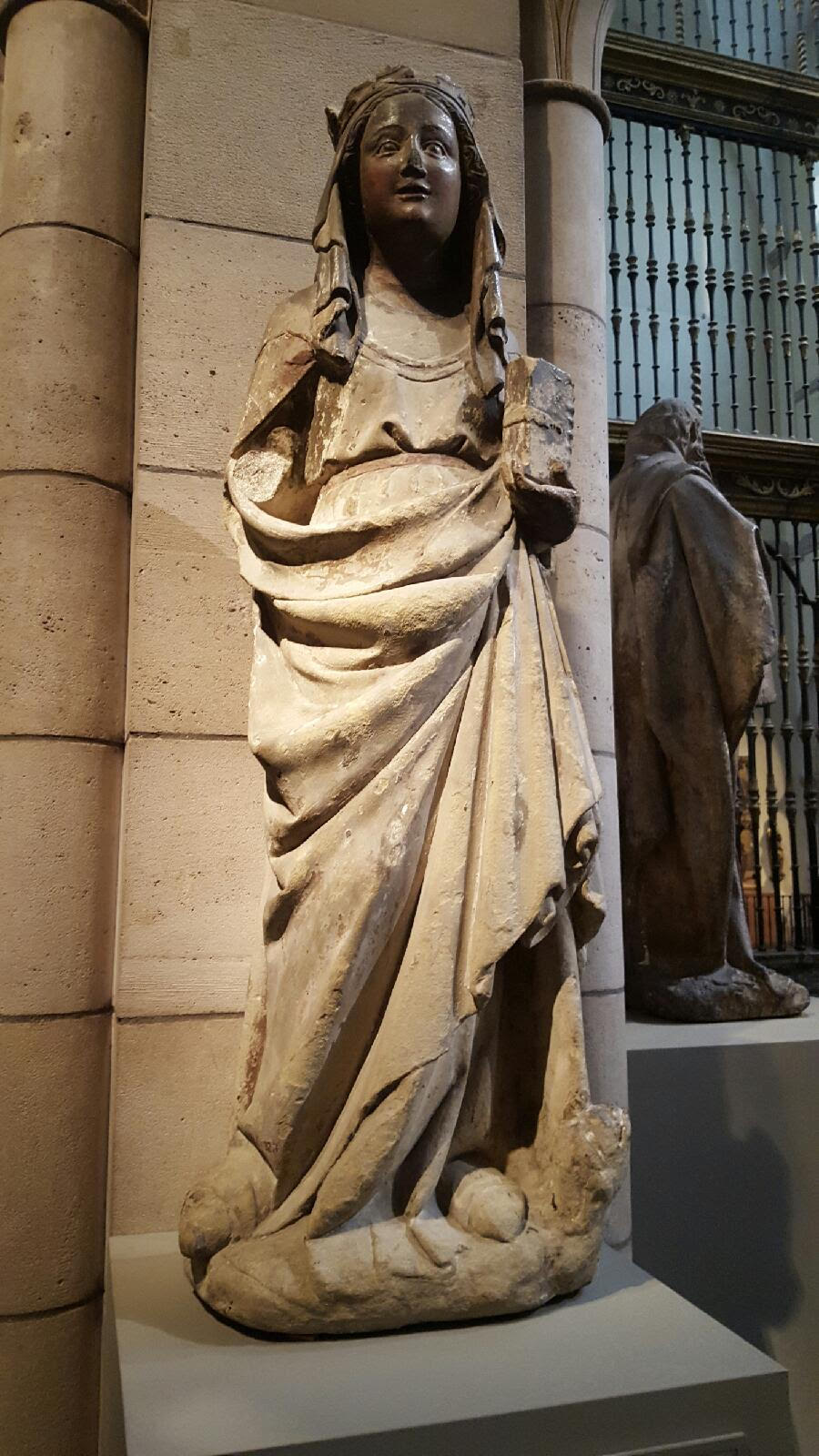
Saint Margaret of Antioch, limestone with paint and gilding, Burgos (c. 1275–1325). (Metropolitan Museum of Art)

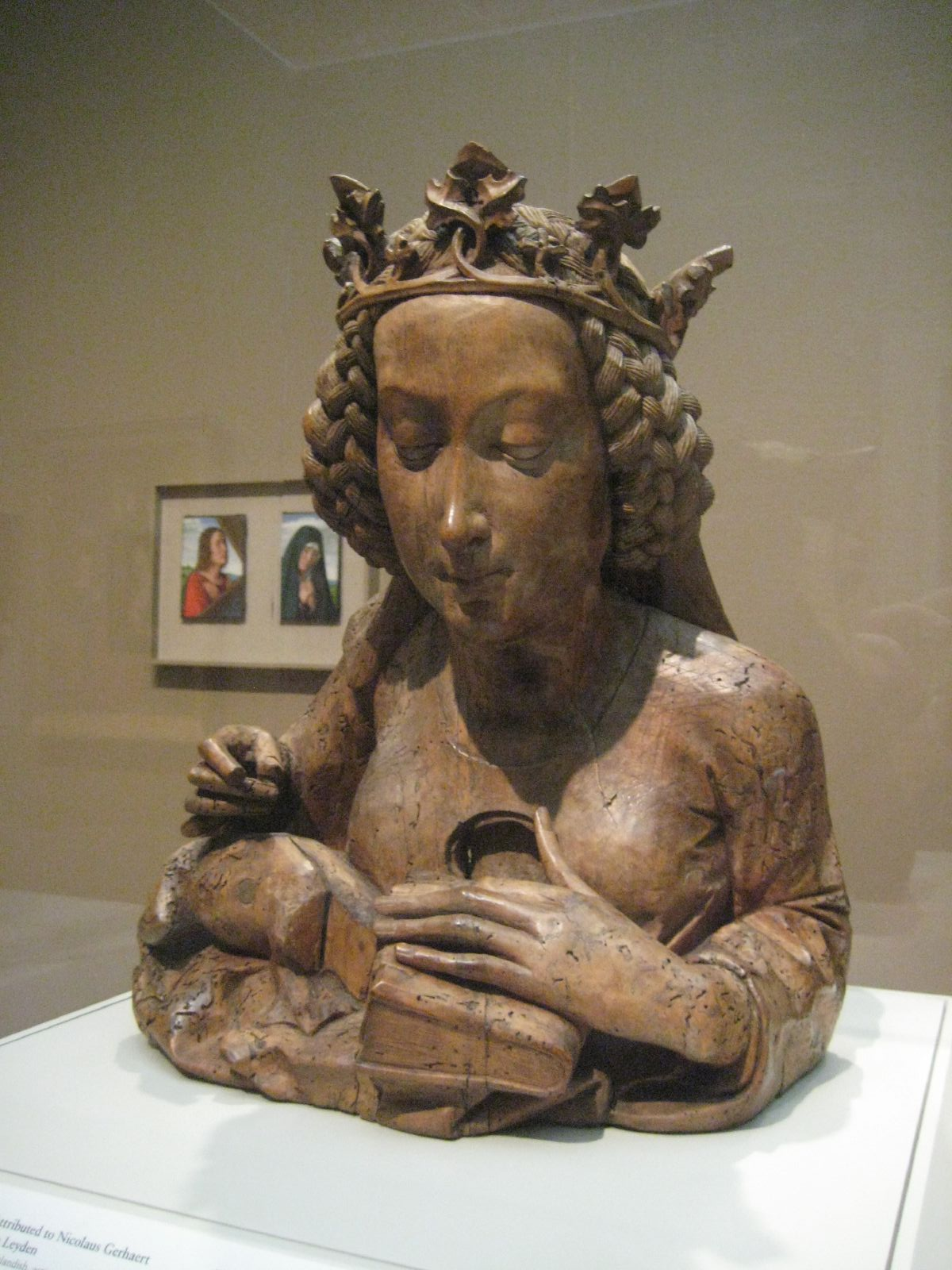
Reliquary Bust of Saint Margaret of Antioch. Attributed to Nikolaus Gerhaert (active in Germany, 1462–73).

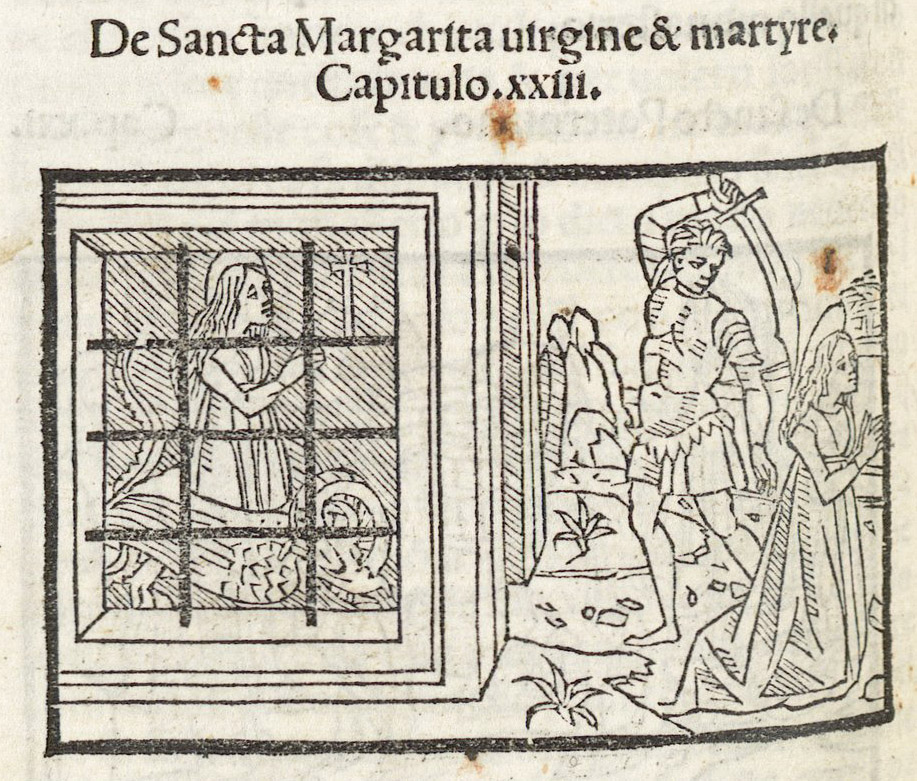
Saint Margaret of Antioch in the Golden Legend (1497).

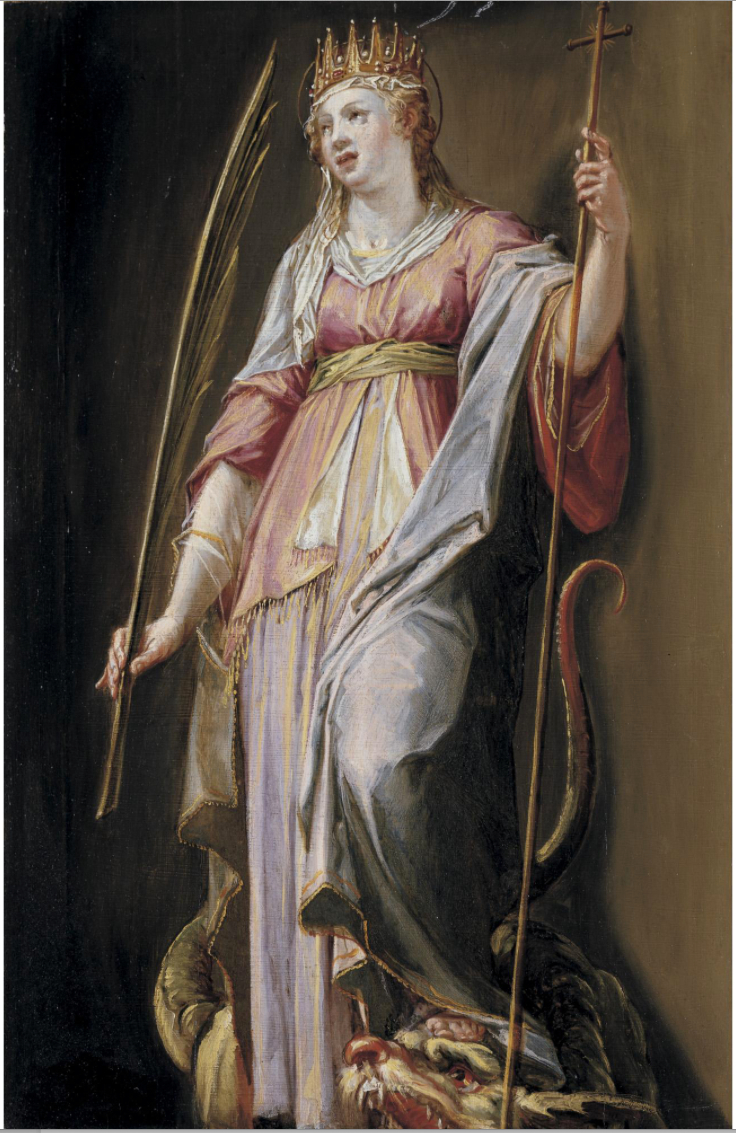
Saint Margaret of Antioch by Peter Candid (second half of the 16th century).

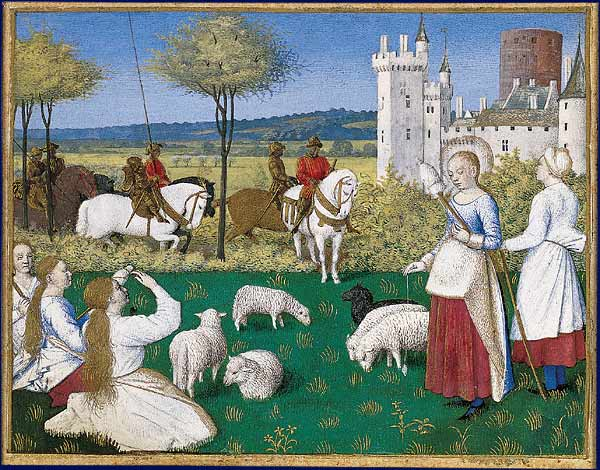
Saint Margaret attracts the attention of the Roman prefect, by Jean Fouquet (from an illuminated manuscript). (1452-60)

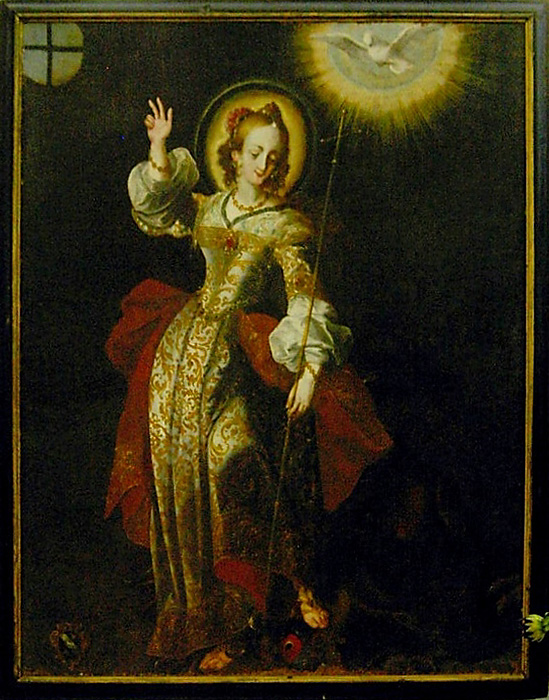
St. Margaret the Virgin, Novacella Abbey, Neustift, South Tyrol, Italy. (18th c.)

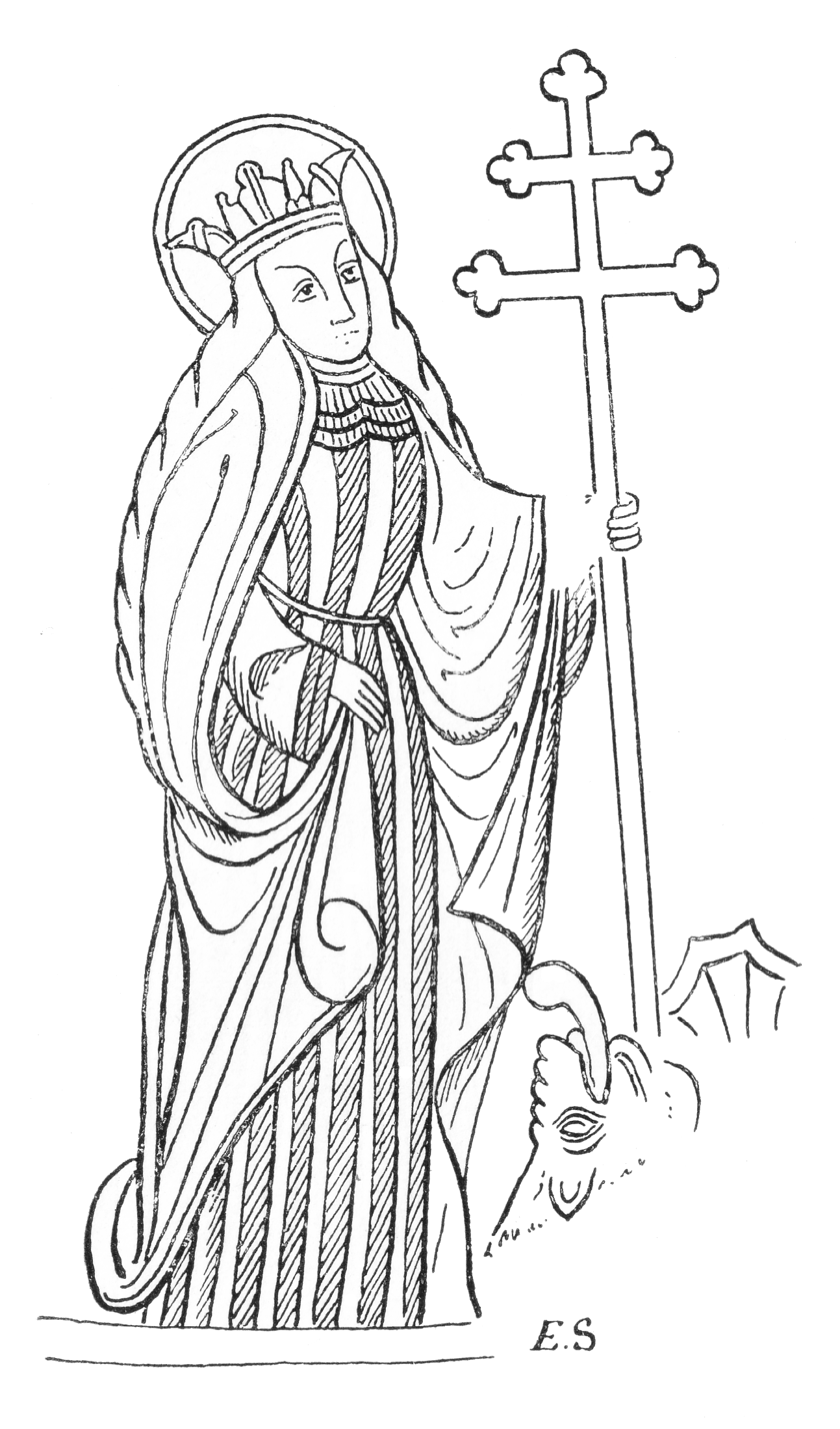
Saint Margaret as a fresco, Sulsted Church.

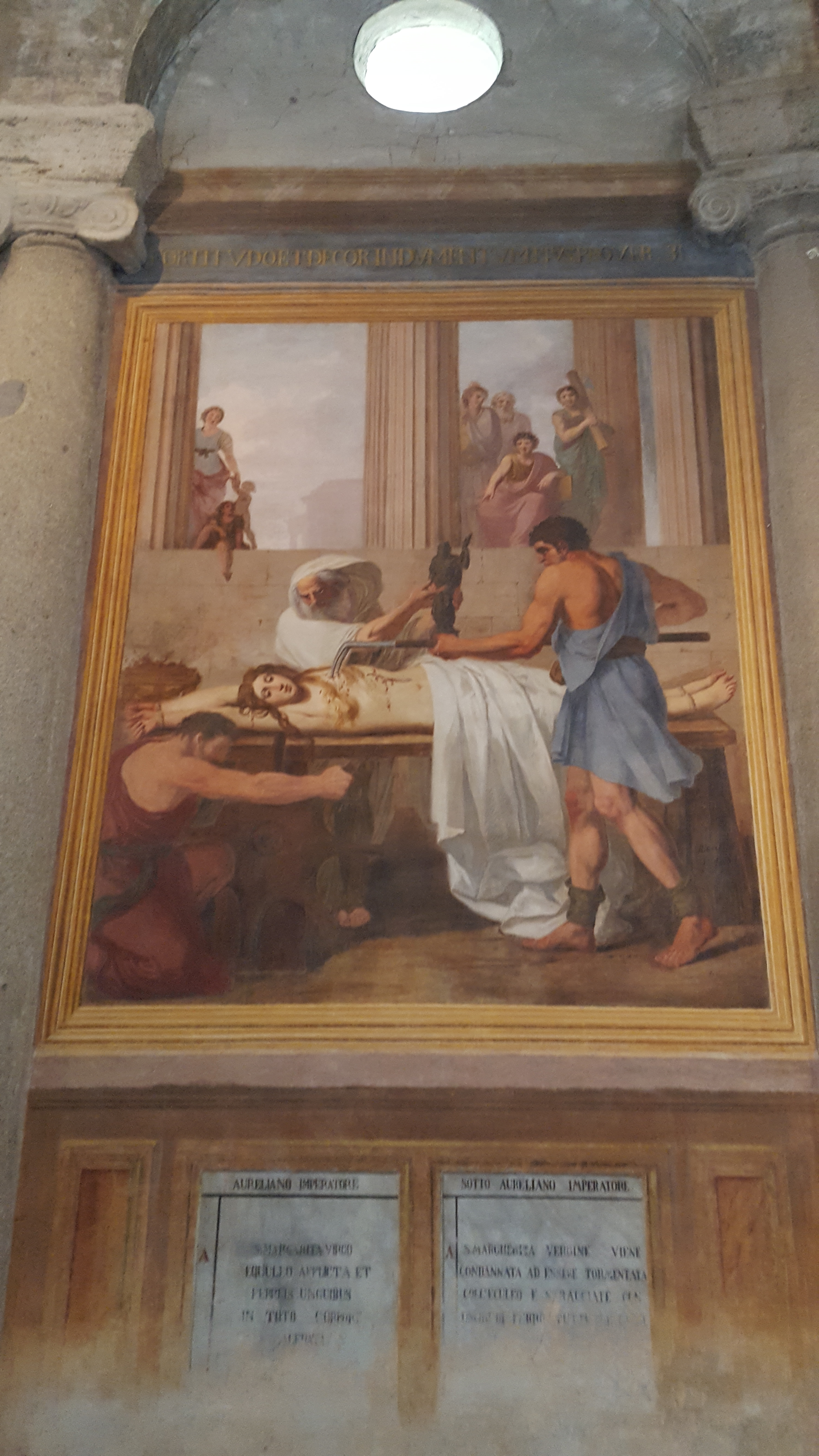
Margaret's torture on a fresco in the Santo Stefano al Monte Celio basilica, Rome, Italy.

Margaret the Virgin in the coat of arms of Vehmaa.

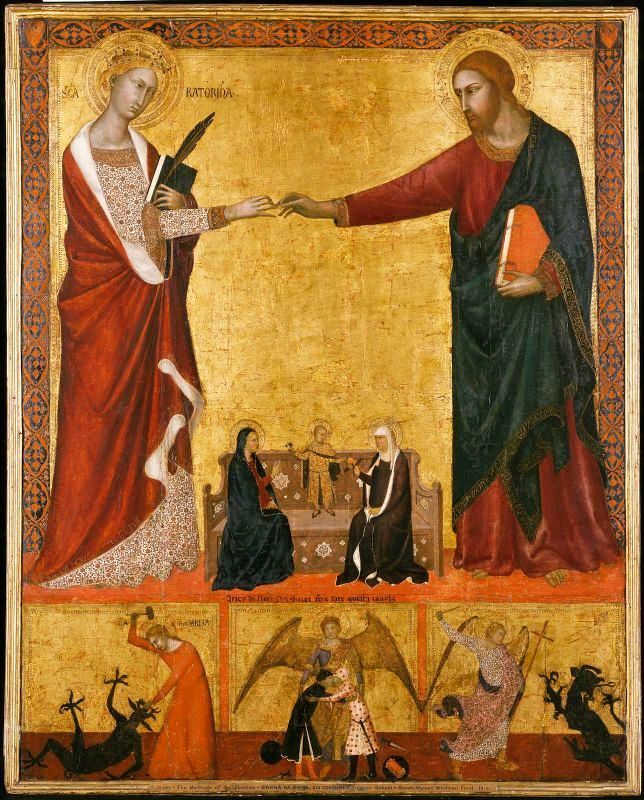
Barna da Siena. Mystic Marriage of St. Catherine. Boston MFA. This mid fourteenth century Byzantine-inspired Sienese painting depicts St. Margaret fighting the demon with a hammer in the bottom left panel. (1340)

== See also ==
- Saint Marina the Monk and Saint Pelagia, both of whom are sometimes conflated or confused with Margaret
