= Langå railway station =

Railway station in East Jutland, Denmark

Langå
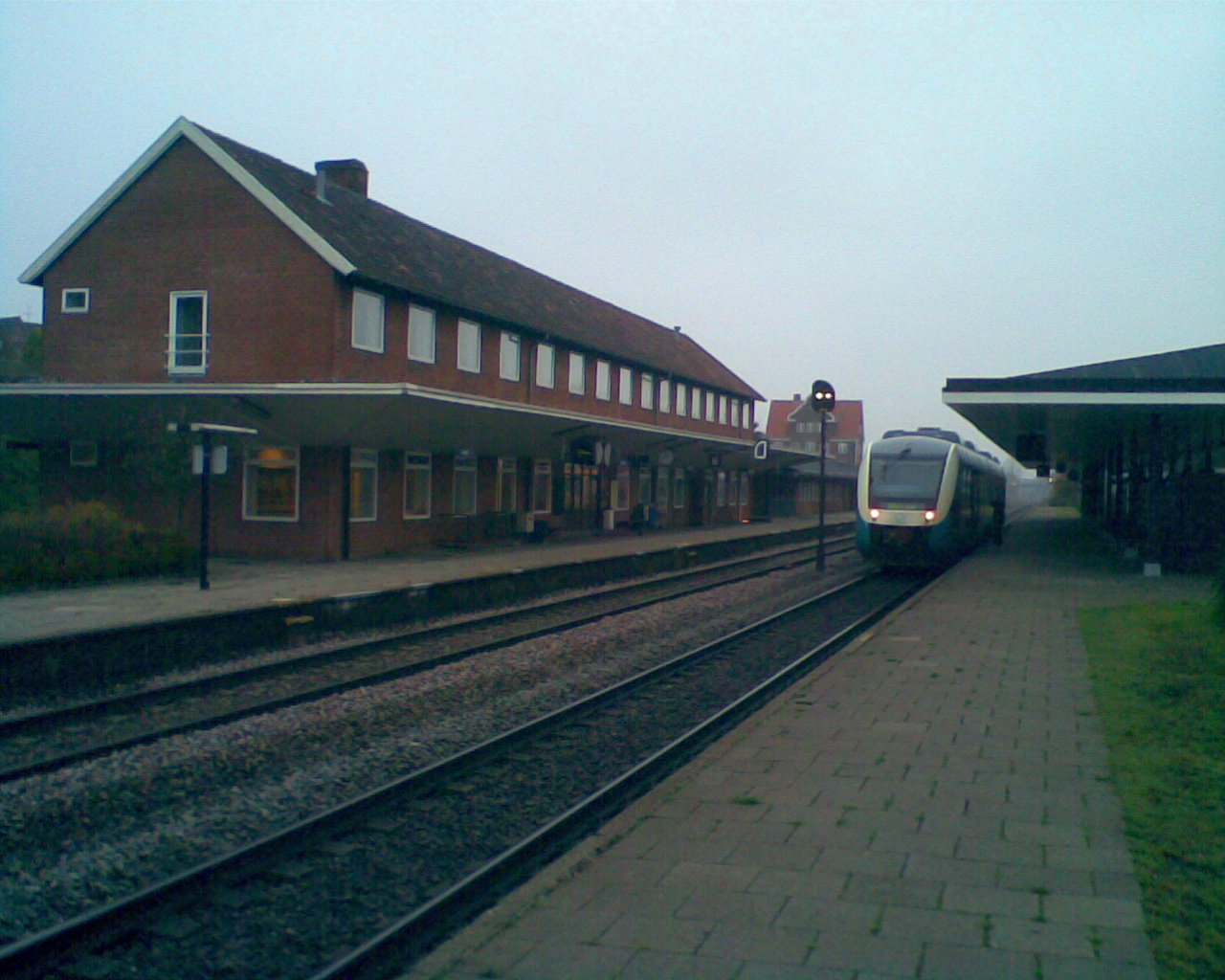
- Langå station in 2008

General information
- Location: Bredgade 55; 8870 Langå; Randers Municipality; Denmark
- Coordinates: 56°23′11.14″N 09°53′46.79″E
- Elevation: 6.8 metres (22 ft)
- Owner: DSB (station infrastructure); Banedanmark (rail infrastructure)
- Lines: Aarhus–Randers; Langå–Struer
- Platforms: 2
- Tracks: 4
- Train operators: DSB

Other information
- Fare zone: 78
- Website: Official website

History
- Opened: 1862

Services
Preceding station	DSB	Following station
Hadsten towards Copenhagen Central	Copenhagen-Aalborg InterCity	Randers towards Aalborg Airport
Preceding station	DSB Vores Tog	Following station
Hadsten towards Århus H	Aarhus–Struer Regional train	Ulstrup towards Struer
Location
- Location within Denmark Location within Central Denmark Region

Langå railway station is a railway station serving the town of Langå in East Jutland, Denmark.

Opened in 1862, the station is an important railway junction which is located on the Aarhus–Randers railway line between Aarhus and Randers and is also the terminus of the Langå–Struer railway line between Langå and Struer. It offers direct InterCity services to Copenhagen and Aalborg as well as regional train services to Aarhus and Struer. The train services are operated by the national train operating company DSB.

== History ==
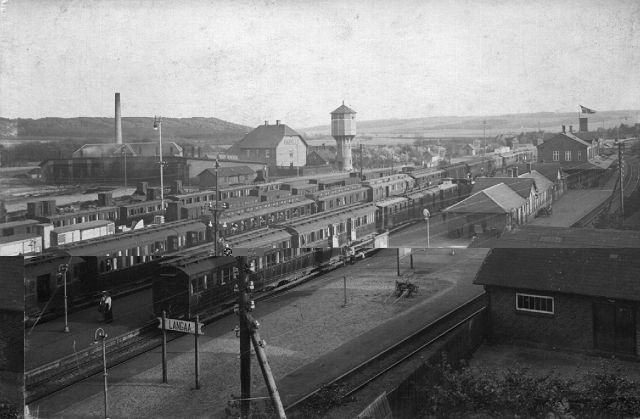
Langå station in 1912

Langå station was opened in 1862 with the opening of the Aarhus-Randers railway line from Aarhus to Randers. In 1863, Langå station also became the eastern terminus of the Langå-Struer railway line.

In 1908, Langå station also became the northern terminus of the new Langå-Bramming railway line. The Langå-Bramming Line was closed in 1971.

== Operations ==
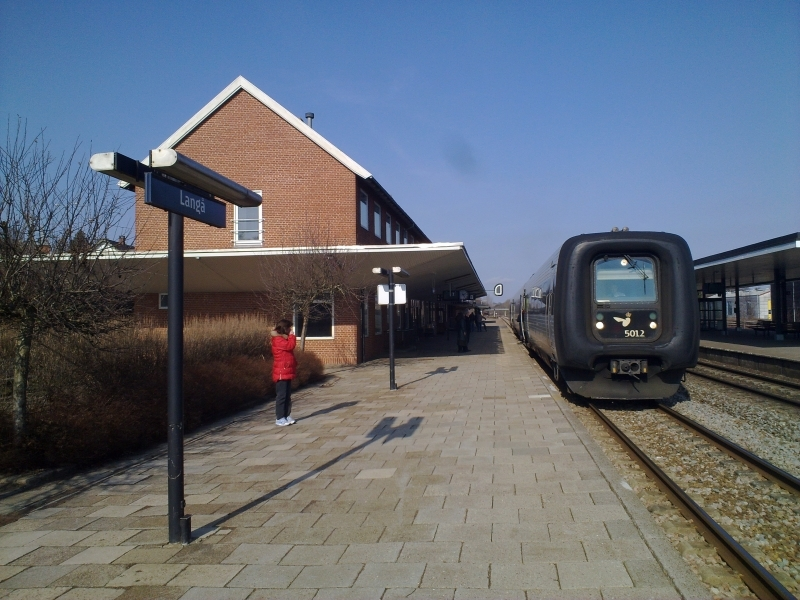
Train at Langå station in 2011

The train services from the station are operated by the national train operating company DSB. The station offers direct InterCity services to Copenhagen and Aalborg as well as regional train services to Aarhus and Struer.

== See also ==
- List of railway stations in Denmark
- Rail transport in Denmark
- History of rail transport in Denmark
- Transportation in Denmark
