= Hadsten railway station =

Railway station in East Jutland, Denmark

Hadsten
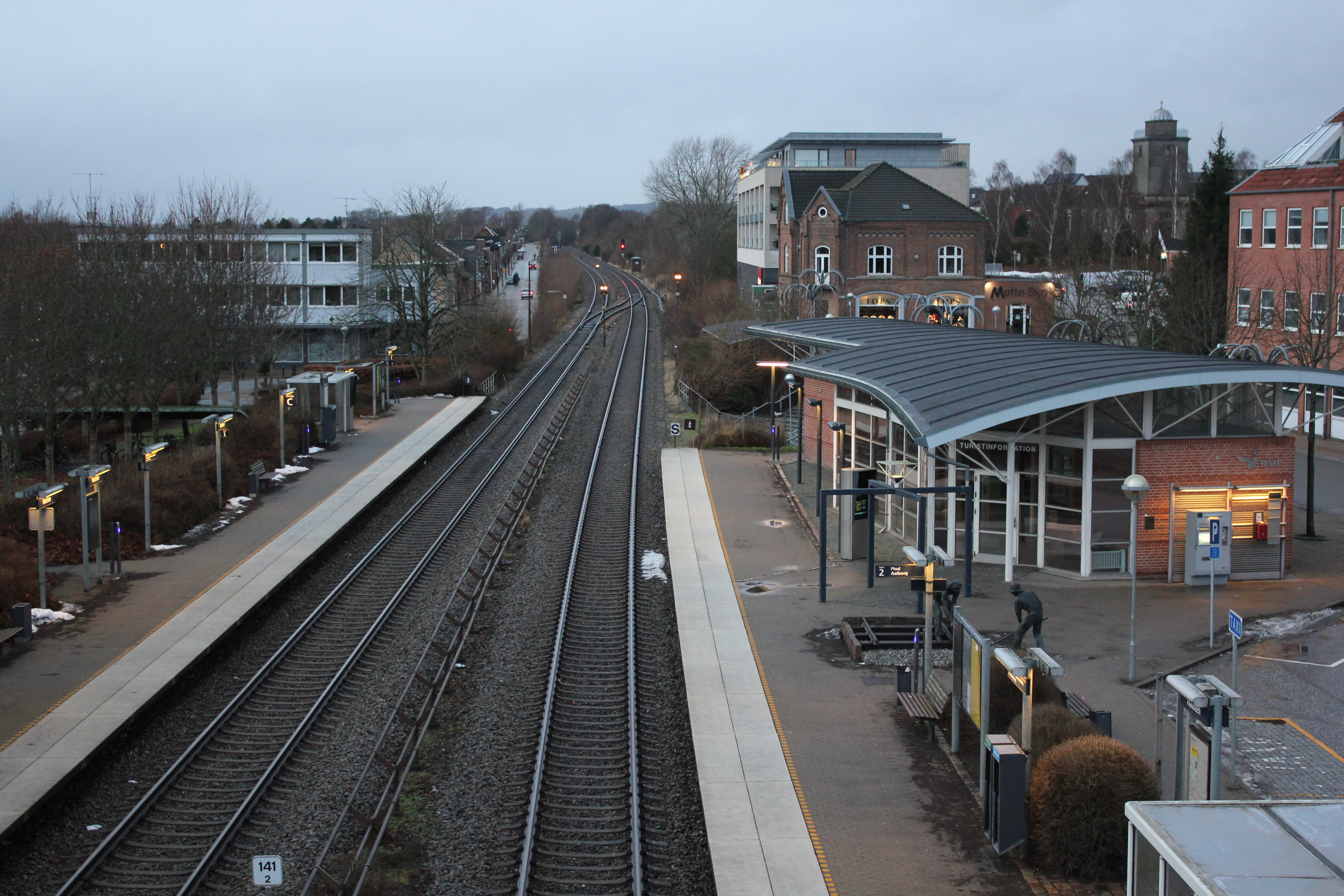
- Hadsten station in 2012

General information
- Location: Østergade 2; 8370 Hadsten; Favrskov Municipality; Denmark
- Coordinates: 56°19′37″N 10°2′54″E
- Elevation: 18.6 metres (61 ft)
- Owner: DSB (station infrastructure); Banedanmark (rail infrastructure)
- Line: Aarhus–Randers railway line
- Platforms: 2
- Tracks: 2
- Train operators: DSB

Other information
- Fare zone: 20

History
- Opened: 2 September 1862

Services
Preceding station	DSB	Following station
Aarhus Central towards Copenhagen Central	Copenhagen-Aalborg InterCity	Langå towards Aalborg Airport
Preceding station	DSB Vores Tog	Following station
Hinnerup towards Århus H	Aarhus–Struer Regional train	Langå towards Struer
Location

Hadsten station is a railway station serving the railway town of Hadsten in East Jutland, Denmark.

The station is located on the Aarhus–Randers railway line between Aarhus and Randers. It offers direct InterCity services to Copenhagen, Aalborg, Frederikshavn and Struer as well as regional train services to Aarhus, Aalborg and Struer. The train services are operated by the national railway company DSB.

== History ==
Hadsten station was opened on 2 September 1862 with the opening of the Aarhus–Randers railway line, from Aarhus to Randers.

== Operations ==
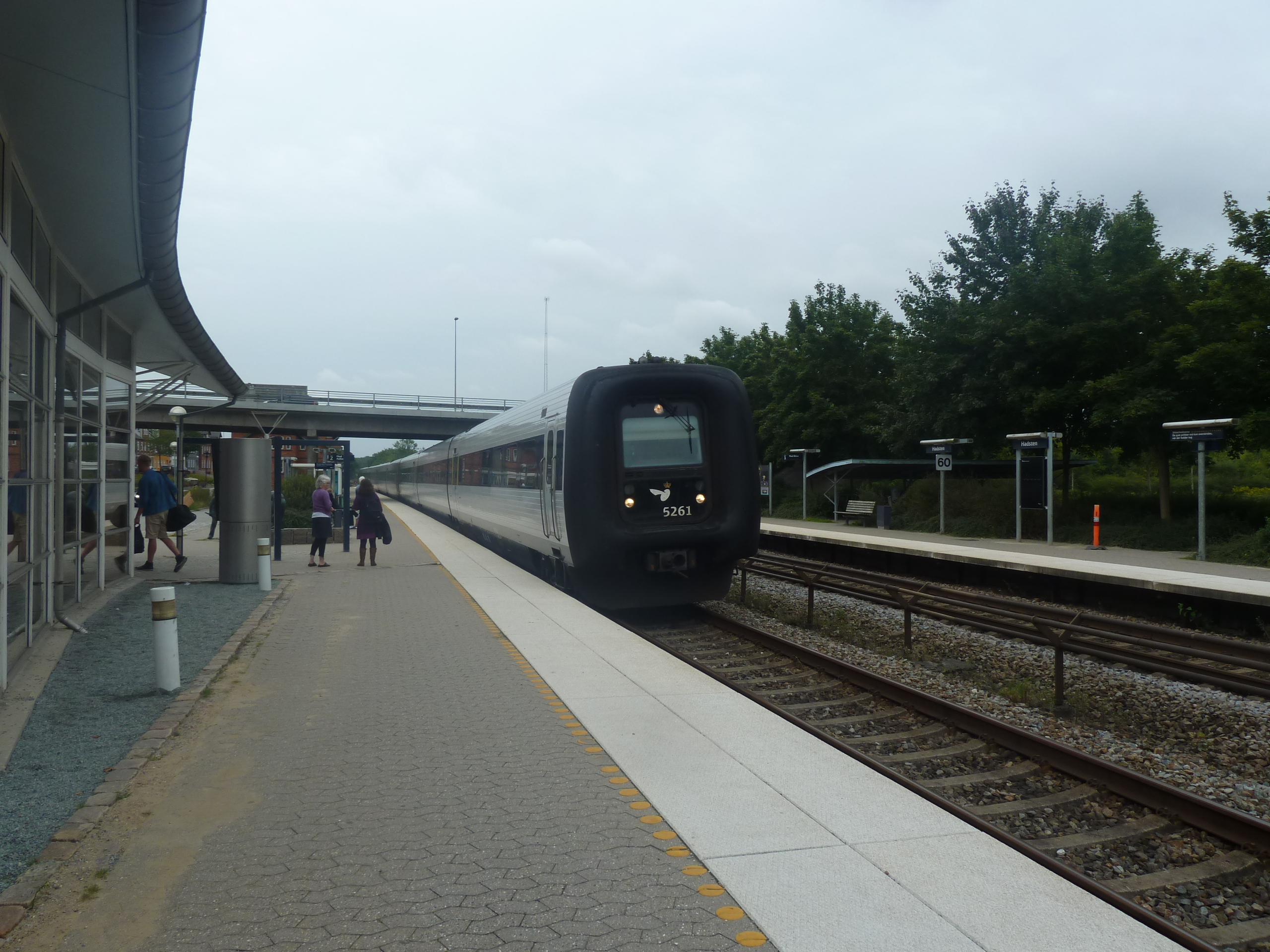
Train at Hadsten station in 2011

The station offers direct InterCity services to Copenhagen and Aalborg as well as regional train services to Aarhus and Struer operated by the national railway company DSB

== See also ==
- List of railway stations in Denmark
- Rail transport in Denmark
