= Randers railway station =

Railway station in Randers, Denmark

Randers Station Randers Banegård
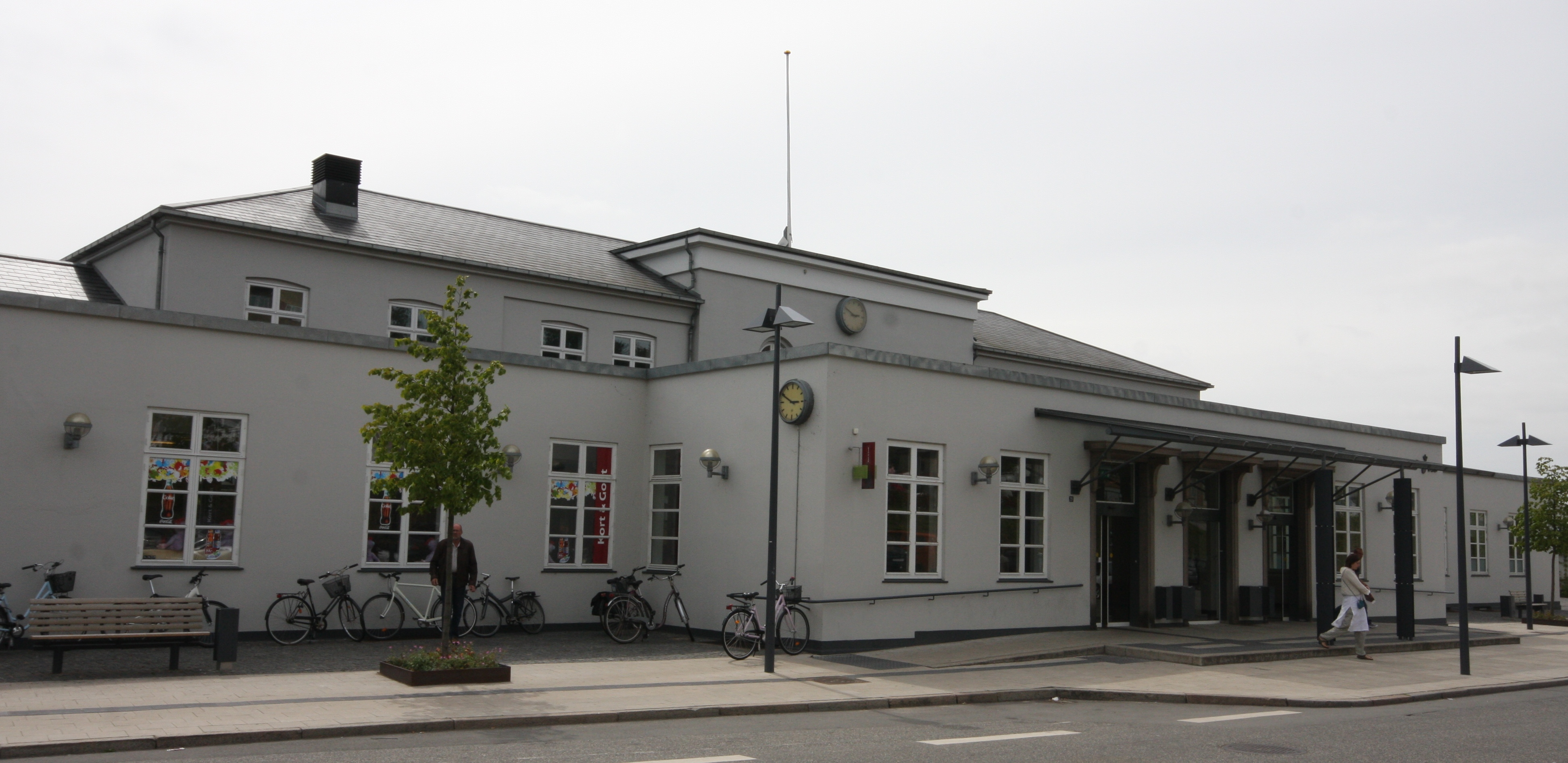
- Front facade of Randers station

General information
- Location: Jernbanegade 29; 8900 Randers C Randers Municipality; Denmark
- Coordinates: 56°27′42″N 10°01′19″E
- Elevation: 4.8 metres (16 ft)
- System: railway station
- Owner: DSB (station infrastructure); Banedanmark (rail infrastructure)
- Lines: Aarhus–Randers (since 1862); Randers–Aalborg (since 1869); Randers–Ryomgaard (1876–1993); Randers–Hadsund (1951–1969)
- Platforms: 3
- Tracks: 4
- Train operators: DSB

Other information
- Fare zone: 80
- Website: Official website

History
- Opened: 1862

Services
Preceding station	DSB	Following station
Aarhus Central towards Copenhagen Airport	Copenhagen-Aalborg InterCityLyn	Hobro towards Aalborg Airport
Langå towards Copenhagen Central	Copenhagen-Aalborg InterCity	Hobro towards Aalborg Airport
Location
- Location within Denmark Location within Central Denmark Region

Randers railway station (Danish: Randers Banegård) is a railway station serving the town of Randers in the East Jutland metropolitan area, Denmark. The station is located in the northwestern part of the town on the western outskirts of the town centre.

The station is located on the Aarhus-Aalborg railway line between Aarhus and Aalborg, and opened in 1862. It offers direct InterCityLyn and InterCity services to Copenhagen and Aalborg. The train services are operated by the railway company DSB.

== History ==
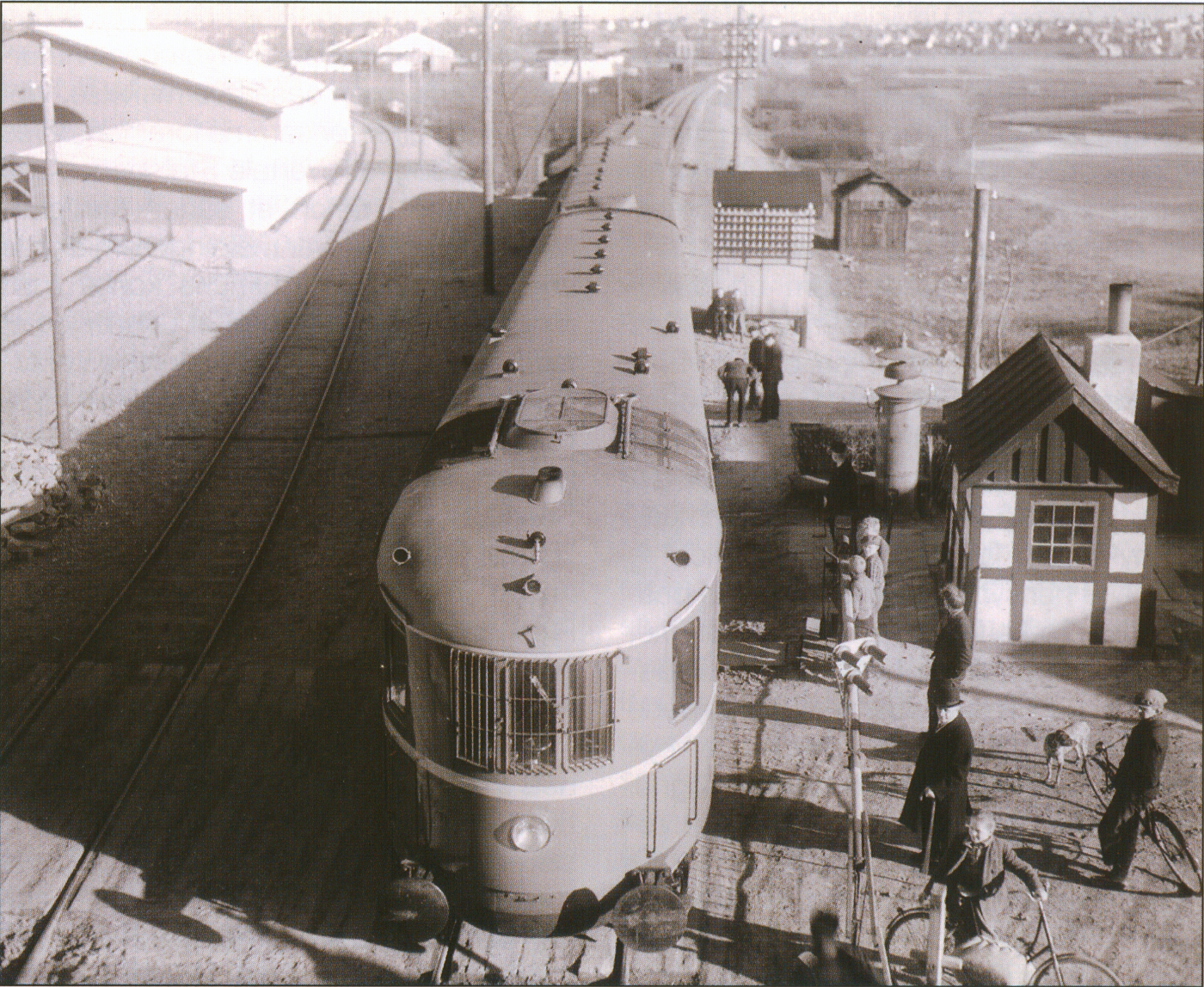
An express train being tested in Randers in 1935

Randers station was opened in 1862 with the opening of the Aarhus–Randers railway line from Aarhus to Randers. In 1869, Randers Station also became the southern terminus of the Randers–Aalborg railway line.

In 1876, Randers Station also became the western terminus of the new Randers-Ryomgård railway line. From 1951, all trains on the Randers-Hadsund railway line (opened in 1883) were continued from Hadsundbanegården station in the eastern part of the city via a connecting track along the harbour to Randers Station. The Randers-Hadsund line was closed in 1969, while passenger traffic on the Randers-Ryomgård line stopped in 1971, with freight service on the line continuing until 1993.

== Architecture ==
The original station building was designed by an unknown architect in 1862. It has been substantially rebuilt since then. The building was last renovated in 2007.

== Operations ==
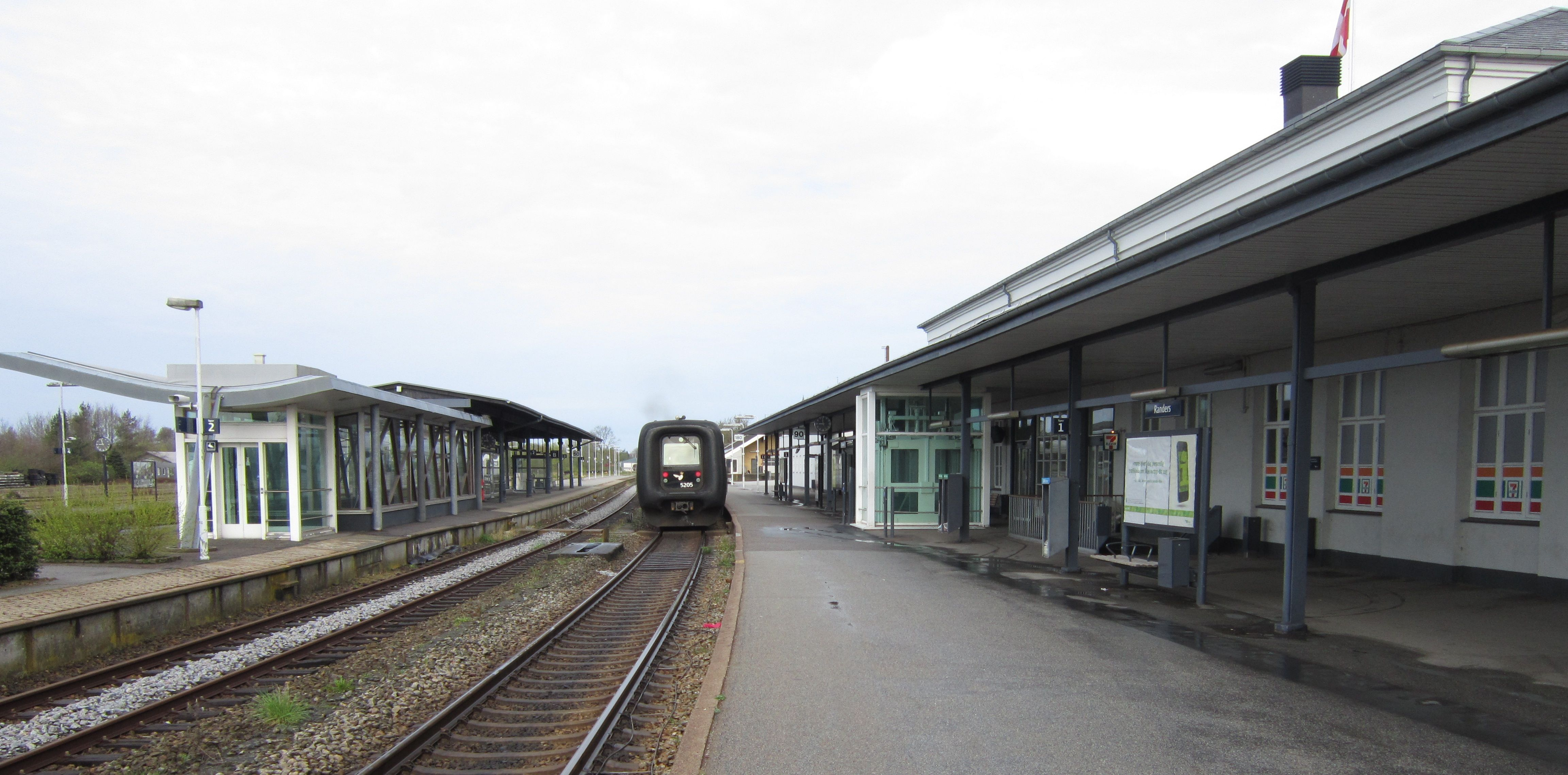
Train at Randers station in 2012

The train services are operated by DSB. The station offers direct InterCityLyn and InterCity services to Copenhagen and Aalborg.

== See also ==
- List of railway stations in Denmark
- Rail transport in Denmark
- History of rail transport in Denmark
