= Aarhus–Randers railway line =

Railway line in Denmark

Coordinates: 56.4556°N 10.0345°E

Aarhus–Randers Line
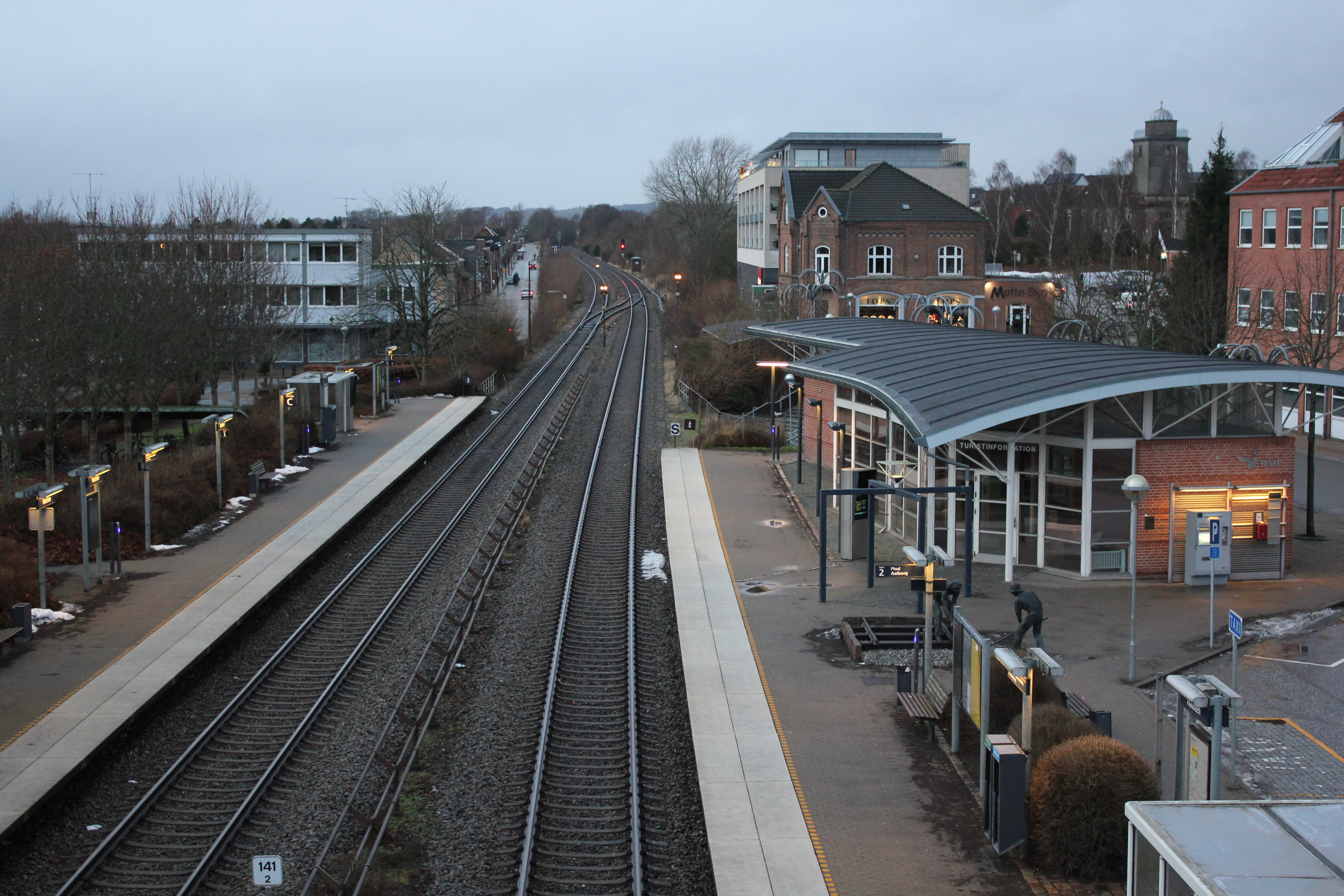
- The Aarhus–Randers railway line at Hadsten station

Overview
- Native name: Aarhus–Randers banen
- Status: Active
- Owner: Banedanmark
- Termini: Aarhus Central Station; Randers station
- Stations: 5

Service
- Type: Main line
- System: Danish railways
- Operator(s): DSB; Arriva

History
- Opened: 2 September 1862

Technical
- Line length: 59.2 kilometres (36.8 mi)
- Number of tracks: Double
- Character: Passenger trains Freight trains
- Track gauge: 1,435 mm (4 ft 8 1/2 in)
- Electrification: None
- Operating speed: 160 km/h (99 mph)
The Aarhus–Randers–Aalborg Line
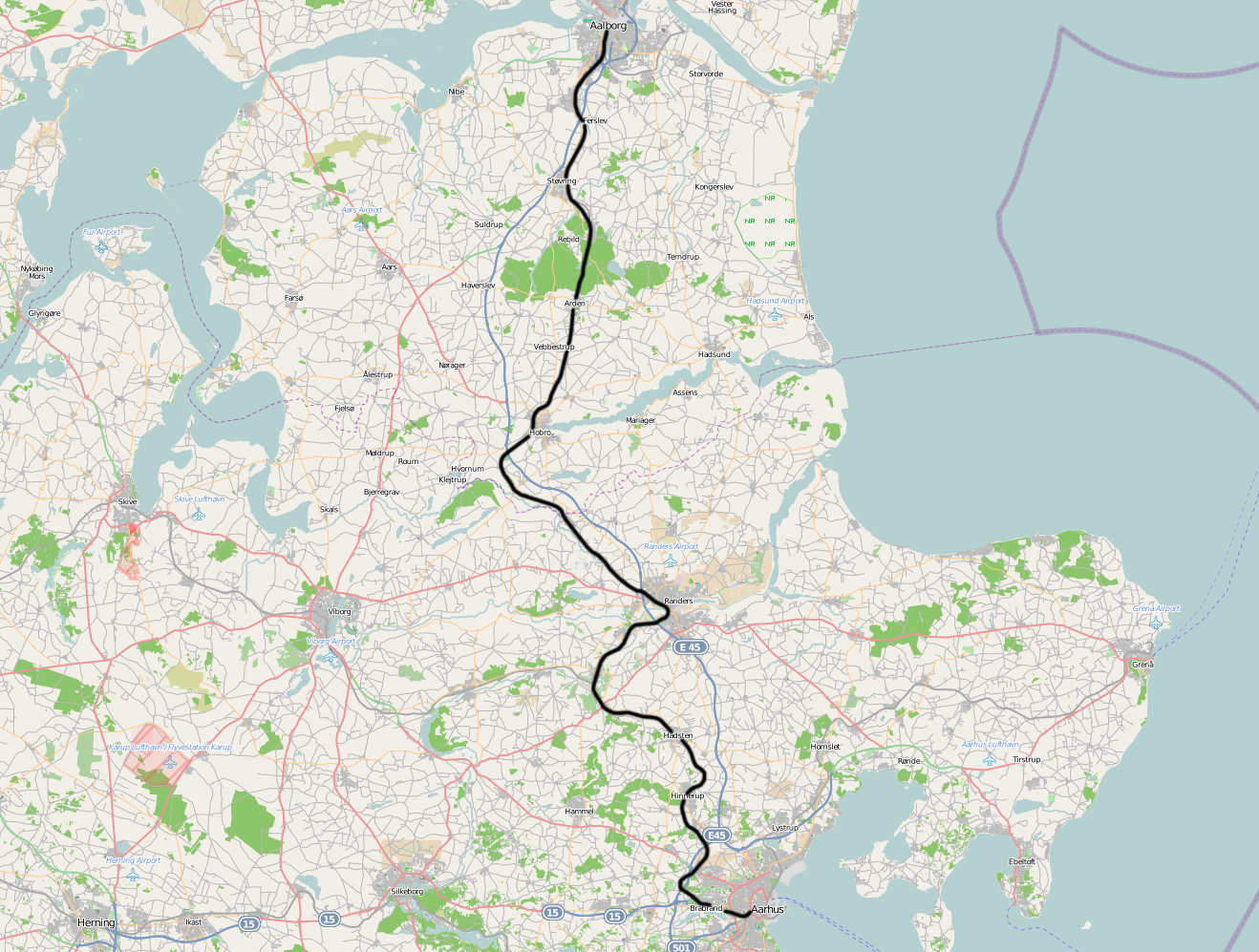
Map of the Aarhus–Randers–Aalborg railway line between Aarhus and Aalborg

The Aarhus–Randers railway line (Danish: Aarhus-Randers Jernbane) is a 59.2 km (36.8 mi) long standard gauge, double track railway line in Denmark which runs between the cities of Aarhus and Randers in East Jutland. It constitutes a section of the East Jutland longitudinal railway line (Danish: Den Østjyske Længdebane), the through route along the east coast of the Jutland Peninsula from the German border at Padborg to the port city of Frederikshavn in North Jutland.

The railway opened in 1862. The line is owned and maintained by Rail Net Denmark and served with passenger trains by the Danish State Railways (DSB) and Arriva.
