= East Jutland metropolitan area =

East Jutland Metropolitan Area Byregion Østjylland Greater Aarhus
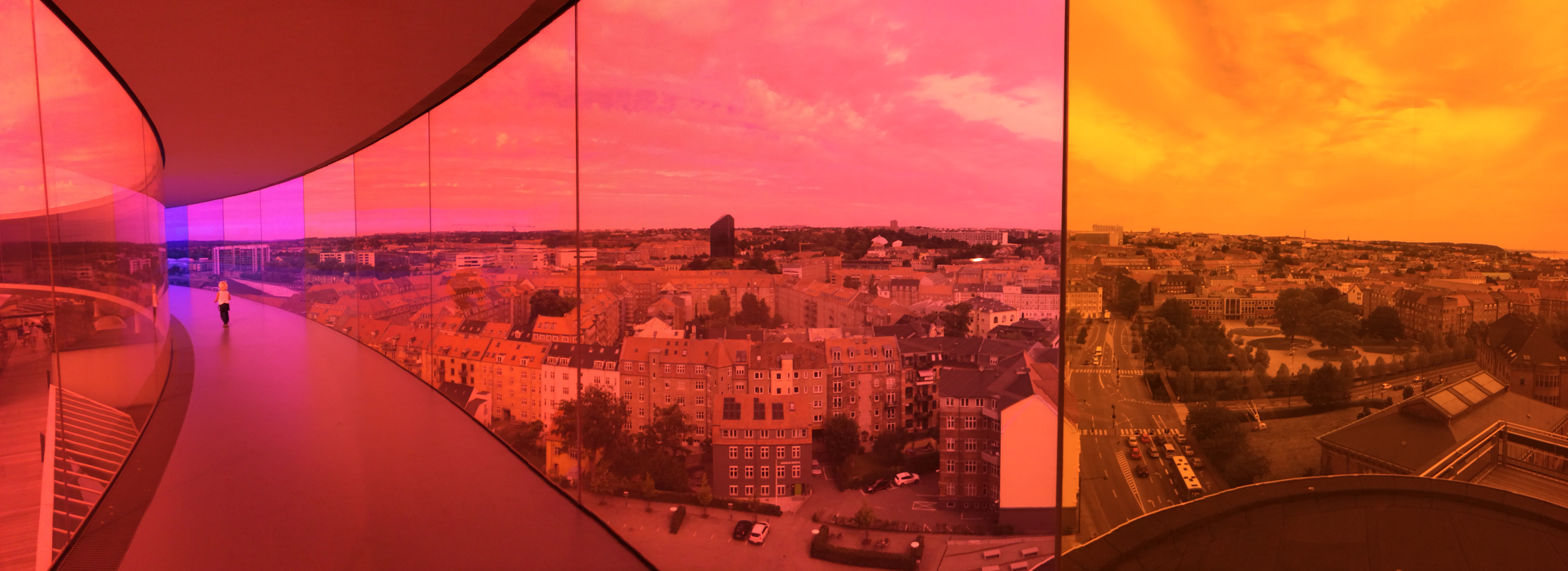
- Core city Aarhus from Your Rainbow Panorama

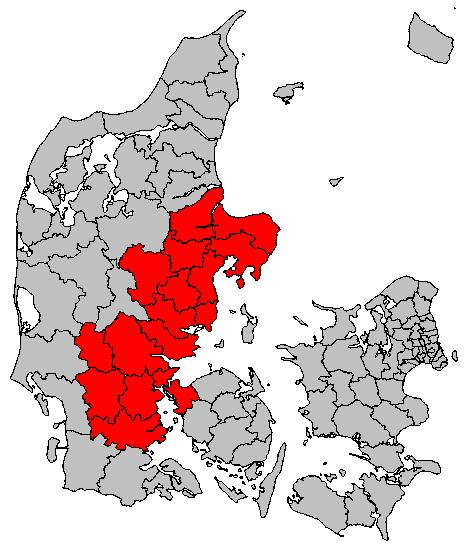
- East Jutland metropolitan area
- Established: 2006

Area
  - Total: 11,521 km^{2} (4,448 sq mi)

Population (1. January 2016)
  - Total: 1,378,978
  - Density: 119.69/km^{2} (310.00/sq mi)

East Jutland metropolitan area (Danish: Byregion Østjylland) is a potential metropolitan area in Jutland and Funen, Denmark. Aarhus is the most populated city in the region.

The National Planning Report of 2006, published by the Danish Environment Ministry, argued that "East Jutland is developing into a coherent area with high population growth and division of labour between the cities in the urban band that extends from Kolding to Randers" and foresaw "the contours of a future million-city". The report recommended dialogue about future development between the state, the region and the municipalities.

In the National Planning Report of 2013, the area was split into East Jutland North (Danish: Østjylland Nord) and the Triangle Region (Danish: Trekantsområdet). The municipalities in the two subregions cooperate as Business Region Aarhus and the Triangle Region respectively.

With about 1.4 million people living in the area, it represents approximately 25% of the population of Denmark. The area has 19 municipalities as of 2016.

== Economy ==
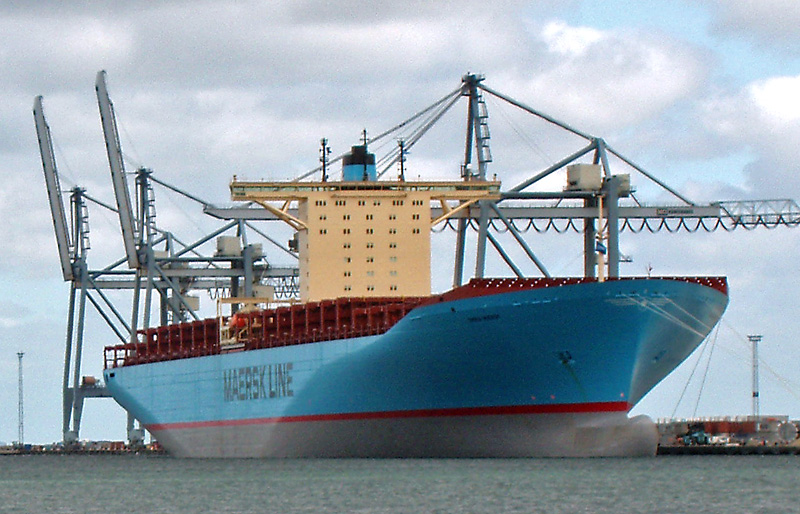
Emma Mærsk, at the time the world's largest container ship, in Aarhus Harbor, 5 September 2006. Aarhus' central location within Denmark facilitates transport throughout the country and beyond

The metropolitan area is a major hub for education and is home to many large companies; in particular in the sectors of food production, agriculture, renewable energy and green tech. Major companies include Vestas Wind Systems A/S and Arla Foods. Vestas is a Danish manufacturer, seller, installer, and servicer of wind turbines and the largest in the world of its kind; and Arla is a Swedish-Danish dairy cooperative with headquarters in Aarhus and is the largest producer of dairy products in Scandinavia and the seventh largest dairy company in the world, measured by turnover. Among cooperative dairy companies, Arla is the third largest in the world.

The primary harbour of the region is Aarhus harbour. It is the largest industrial harbour in Denmark and among largest in Northern Europe, only surpassed by the Swedish industrial harbour in Gothenburg in the Kattegat sea area. It handles approximately 12 million tonnes of cargo (2006) per year and is therefore among the 100 biggest container ports in the world.

Greater Aarhus is home to some of the world's biggest manufacturers of wind turbines and constitutes one of the world's most advanced knowledge centers. An array of suppliers and subcontractors covers the entire supply chain. The sector benefits from political backing of wind energy on a local, regional and national level. As a knowledge hub and gathering point for the wind industry, Aarhus is likely to play an important role in developing the wind energy systems of the future:

· 87% of Denmark's combined turnover from wind energy is generated by businesses in the Greater Aarhus area

· 53% of Denmark's high-skill wind employees work in the Greater Aarhus area

· 57% of all top executives in the Danish wind industry work in the Greater Aarhus area

· 14,000 employees in the Danish wind industry work within Central Region Denmark – 11,000 of them within one hour drive from Aarhus.

== Colleges and universities ==
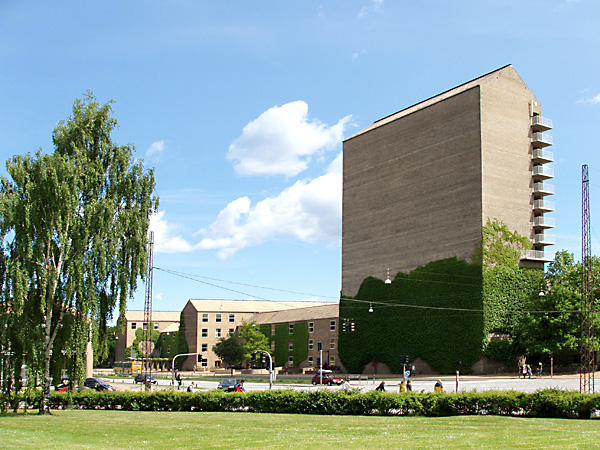
Aarhus University

Notable universities and educational institutions within the area includes:

- Aarhus University
- University of Southern Denmark
- Aarhus School of Architecture
- Aarhus School of Business
- Aarhus Technical College
- Engineering College of Aarhus
- The Danish School of Journalism
- VIA University College

== Infrastructure ==

There are two primary commercial international airports serving the area:

- Aarhus Airport (in the north)
- Billund Airport (in the south)

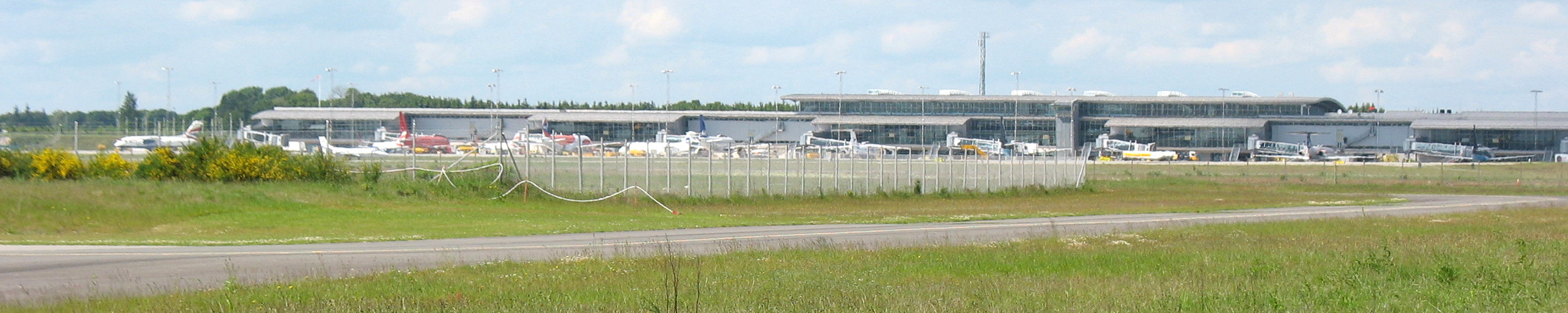
Billund Airport 2007

The area has several motorways but the European route E45 goes from the south to the north and is central to the area's growth.

== Statistics ==
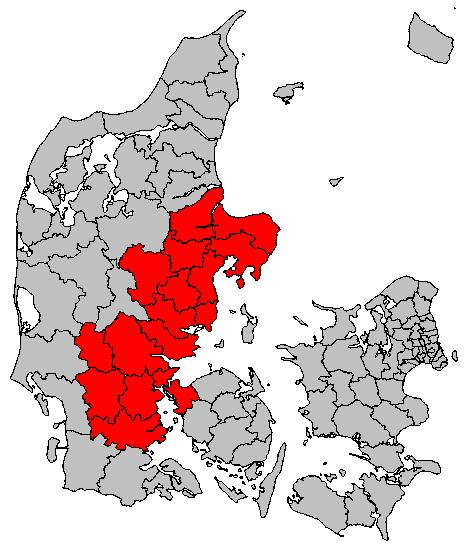
East Jutland metropolitan area

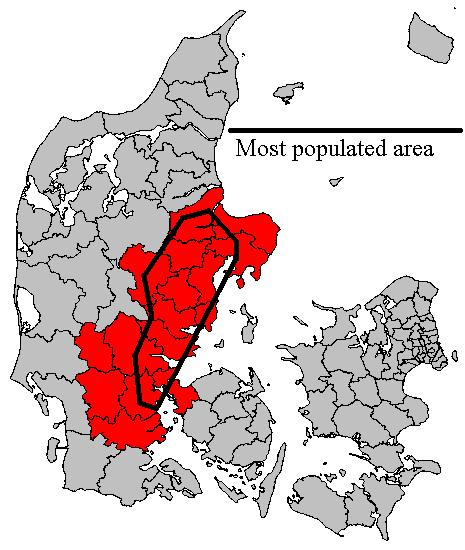
East Jutland metropolitan area, most populous area

Year	Population
2008	1,212,781
2009	1,223,823
2010	1,231,151
2011	1,239,416
2012	1,246,252
2013	1,254,152
2014	1,260,620
2016	1,378,978

The core area around Aarhus is the most populated area in East Jutland, and that area is much smaller in km^{2} – 6,182 km^{2} – (2386 sq. mi) and with a population of more than one million.

The figures below are for the core area centered on Aarhus and most populous area in the East Jutland metropolitan area as of 1 January 2016.

Municipality	Population	Area¹	Density²
Århus municipality	330,639	468	698
Vejle municipality	111,743	1,058	103
Randers municipality	97,520	746	129
Kolding municipality	91,695	607	145
Silkeborg municipality	90,719	850	102
Horsens municipality	87,736	519	166
Skanderborg municipality	59,481	416	141
Fredericia municipality	50,689	134	376
Favrskov municipality	47,655	540	87
Hedensted municipality	46,206	551	83
Odder municipality	22,131	223	98
East jutland core area	1,036,214	6,182	168

The figures below are for the whole East Jutland metropolitan area as of 1 January 2016.

Municipality	Population	Area¹	Density²
Århus municipality	330,639	468	698
Vejle municipality	111,743	1,058	103
Randers municipality	97,520	746	129
Viborg municipality	95,776	1,409	68
Kolding municipality	91,695	607	145
Silkeborg municipality	90,719	850	102
Horsens municipality	87,736	515	163
Skanderborg municipality	59,481	416	140
Haderslev municipality	56,029	815	69
Fredericia municipality	50,689	134	376
Favrskov municipality	47,655	540	87
Hedensted municipality	46,206	551	83
Vejen municipality	42,869	812	53
Syddjurs municipality	41,889	689	59
Norddjurs municipality	38,144	721	53
Middelfart municipality	37,913	299	126
Billund municipality	26,434	540	49
Odder municipality	22,131	223	97
Samsø municipality	3,710	113	32
Total East jutland metropolitan area	1,378,978	11,521	119

== Subregions ==
In the National Planning Report of 2013 (Danish: Landsplanredegørelse 2013), the term East Jutland metropolitan area was replaced by the two subregions of East Jutland North (Danish: Østjylland Nord) and the Triangle Region (Danish: Trekantsområdet). The municipalities of the two subregions cooperate as Business Region Aarhus and the Triangle Region.

=== Business Region Aarhus ===
Business Region Aarhus is a partnership between the 12 municipalities of Favrskov, Hedensted, Horsens, Norddjurs, Odder, Randers, Samsø, Silkeborg, Skanderborg, Syddjurs, Viborg, and Aarhus, all in the Central Denmark Region. The partnership began in 1994, before the Danish municipal reform of 2007. The region originally formed the northernmost part of the East Jutland metropolitan area and Samsø Municipality, but since 24 February 2016, Viborg municipality was also included. The Aarhus area was classified in a 2005 ESPON (European Spatial Planning Observation Network) report as a Category 3 MEGA. MEGAs are Metropolitan European Growth Areas, of which the report identified 76 in Europe.

The term Greater Aarhus is used indistinctly in various contexts, but according to Aarhus Municipality it includes the 9 municipalities of Aarhus, Randers, Norddjurs, Syddjurs, Viborg, Silkeborg, Odder, Horsens and Samsø.

=== Triangle Region ===
The Triangle Region is a partnership between the 7 municipalities of Billund, Fredericia, Haderslev, Kolding, Middelfart, Vejen and Vejle, all in the Southern Denmark Region. Kolding is the most populated town in the Triangle Region.

== Gallery ==
Towns

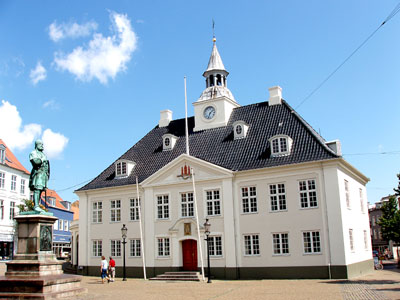
Randers, old city hall.

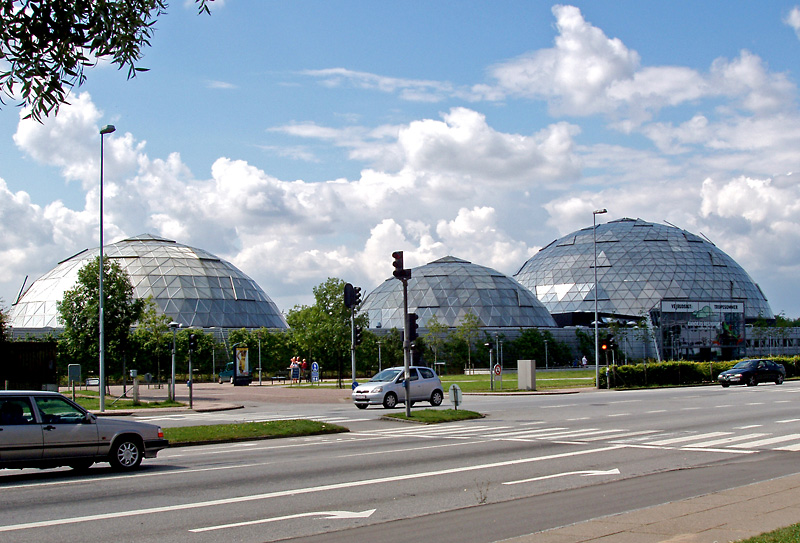
Randers Tropical Zoo

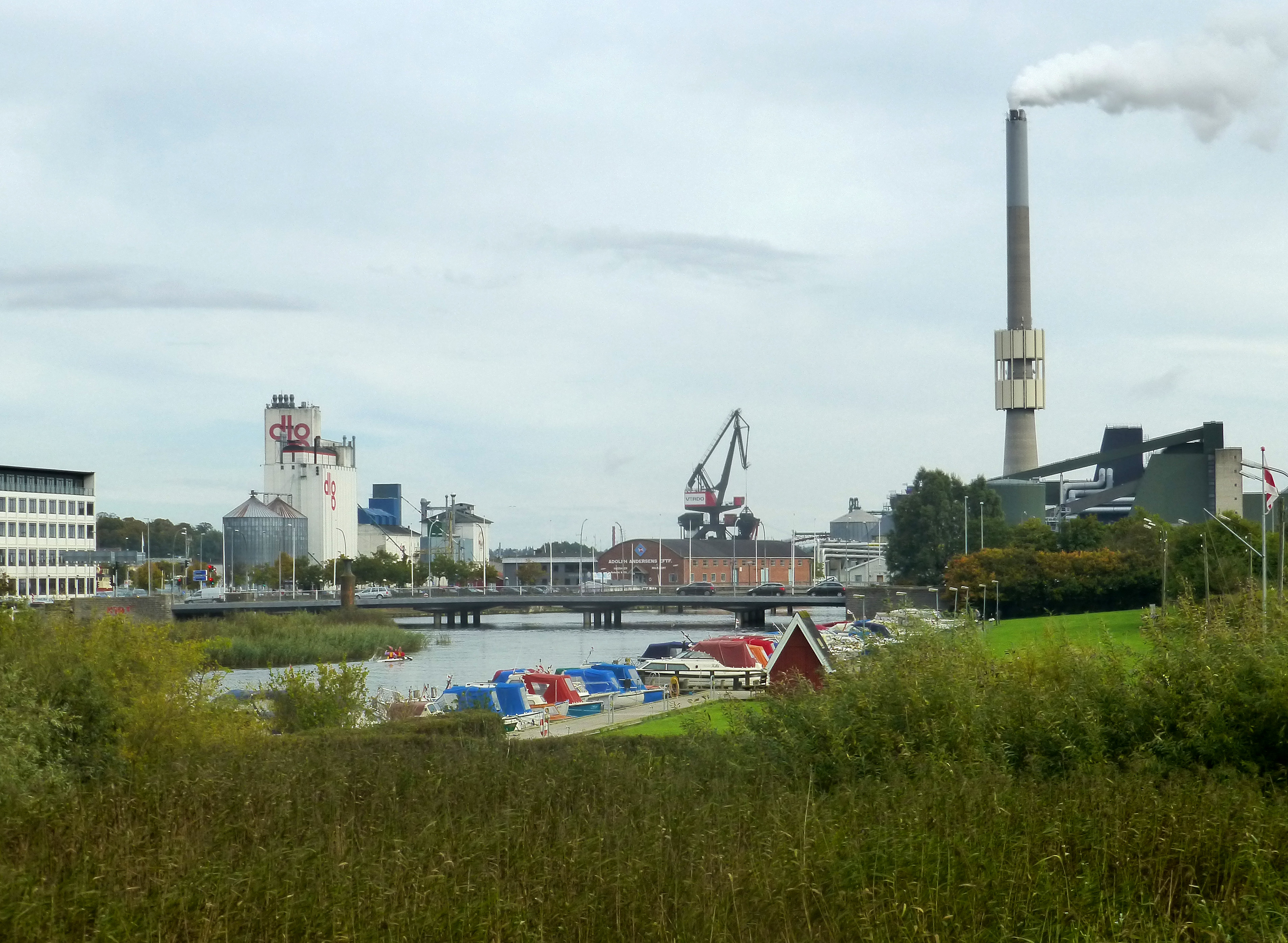
Randers harbour

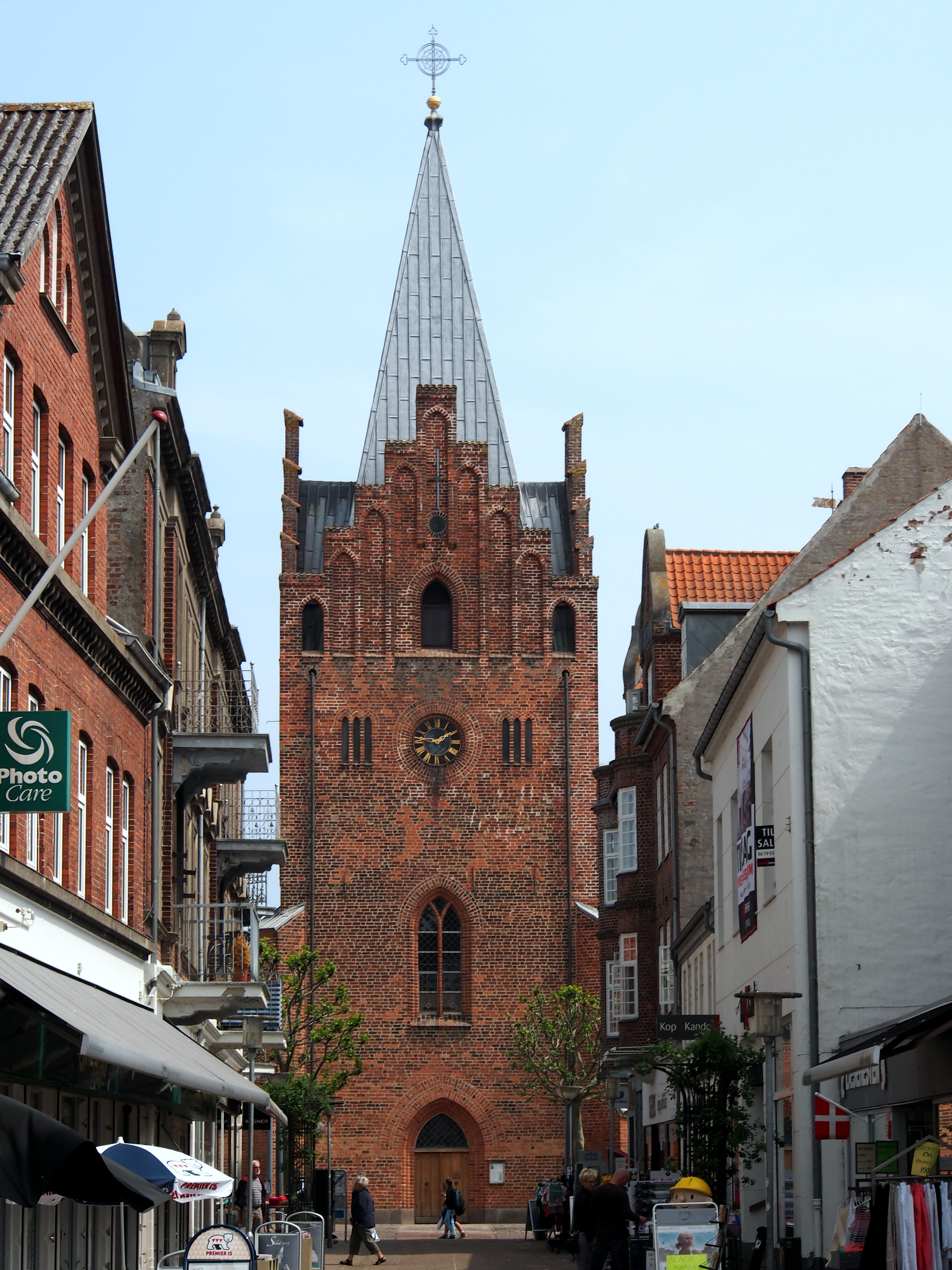
Norddjurs, Grenå

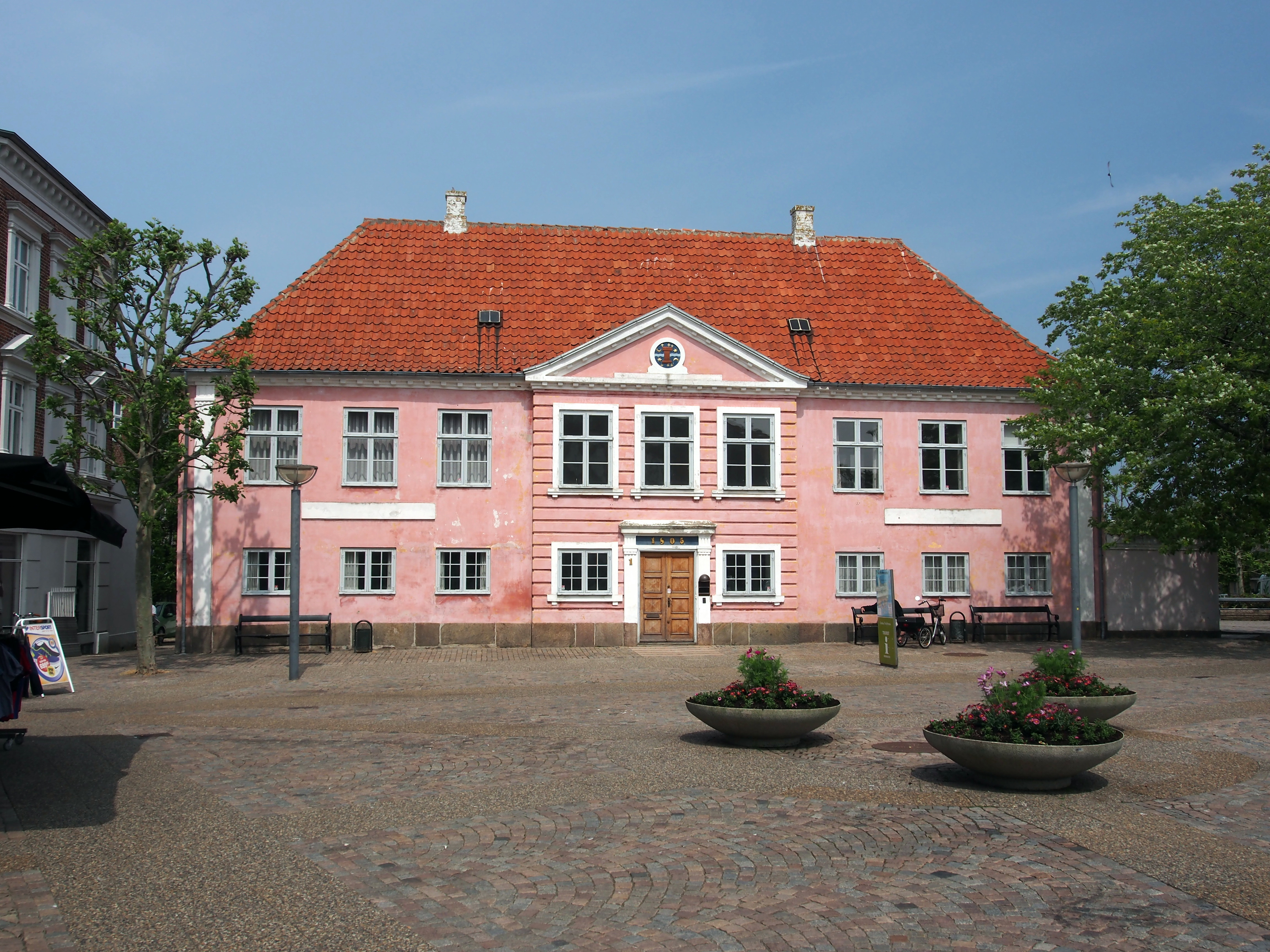
Norddjurs, Grenå

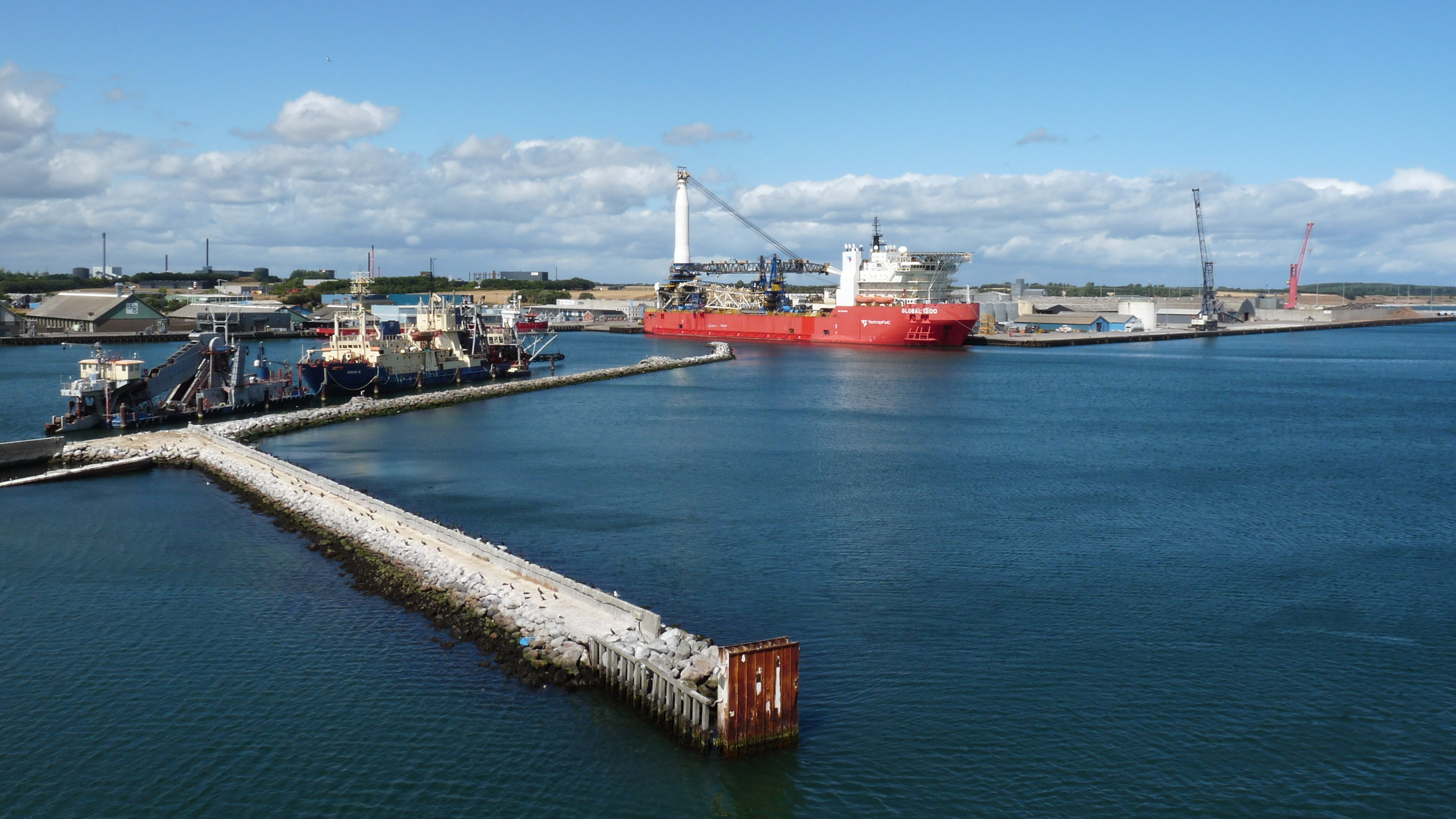
Norddjurs, Grenå harbour

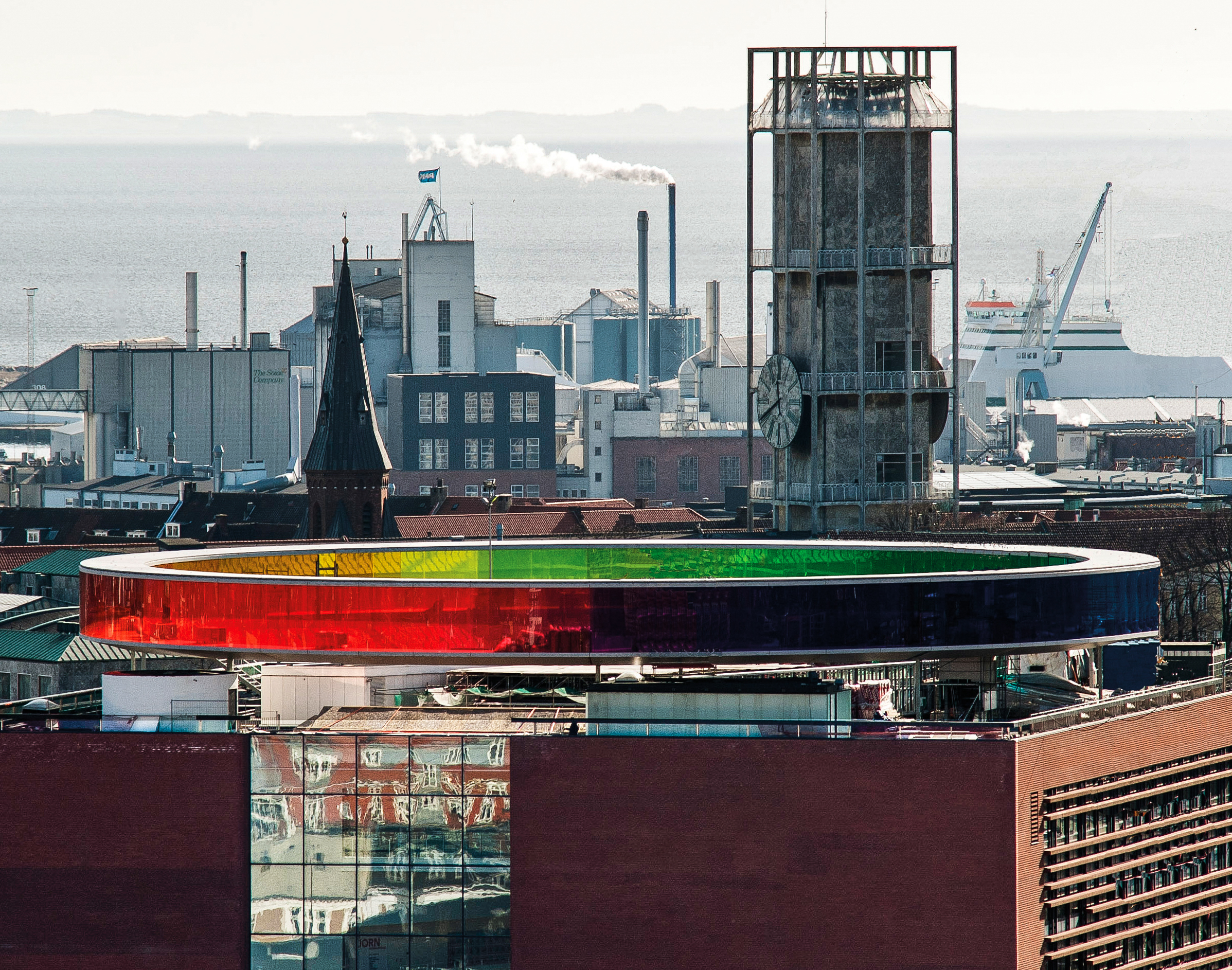
Aarhus

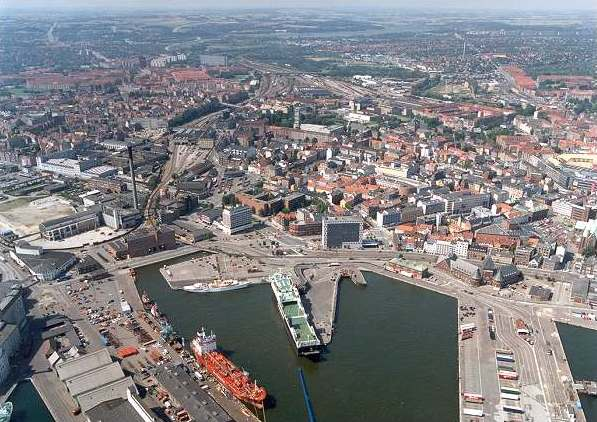
Aarhus harbour

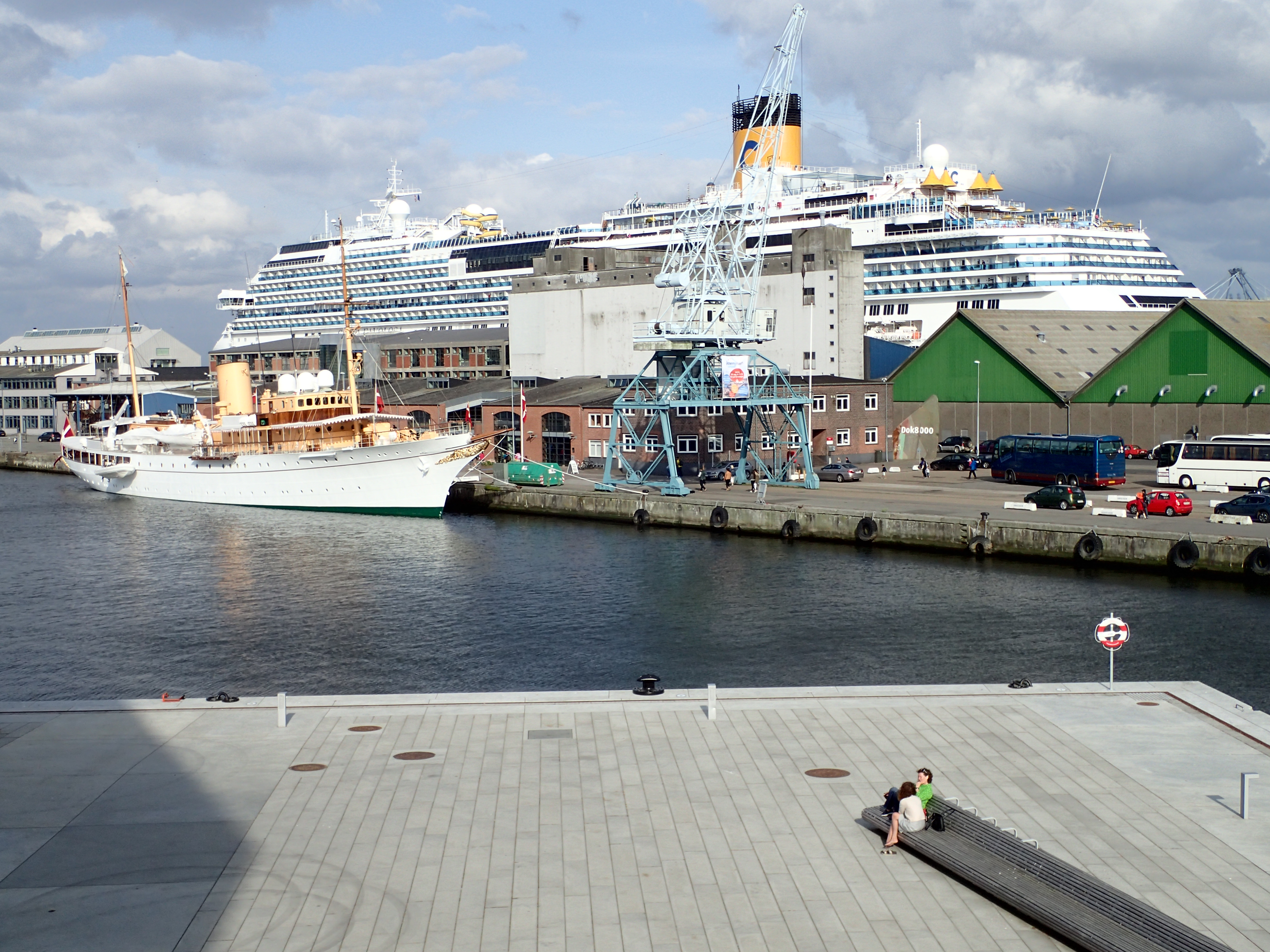
Aarhus harbour

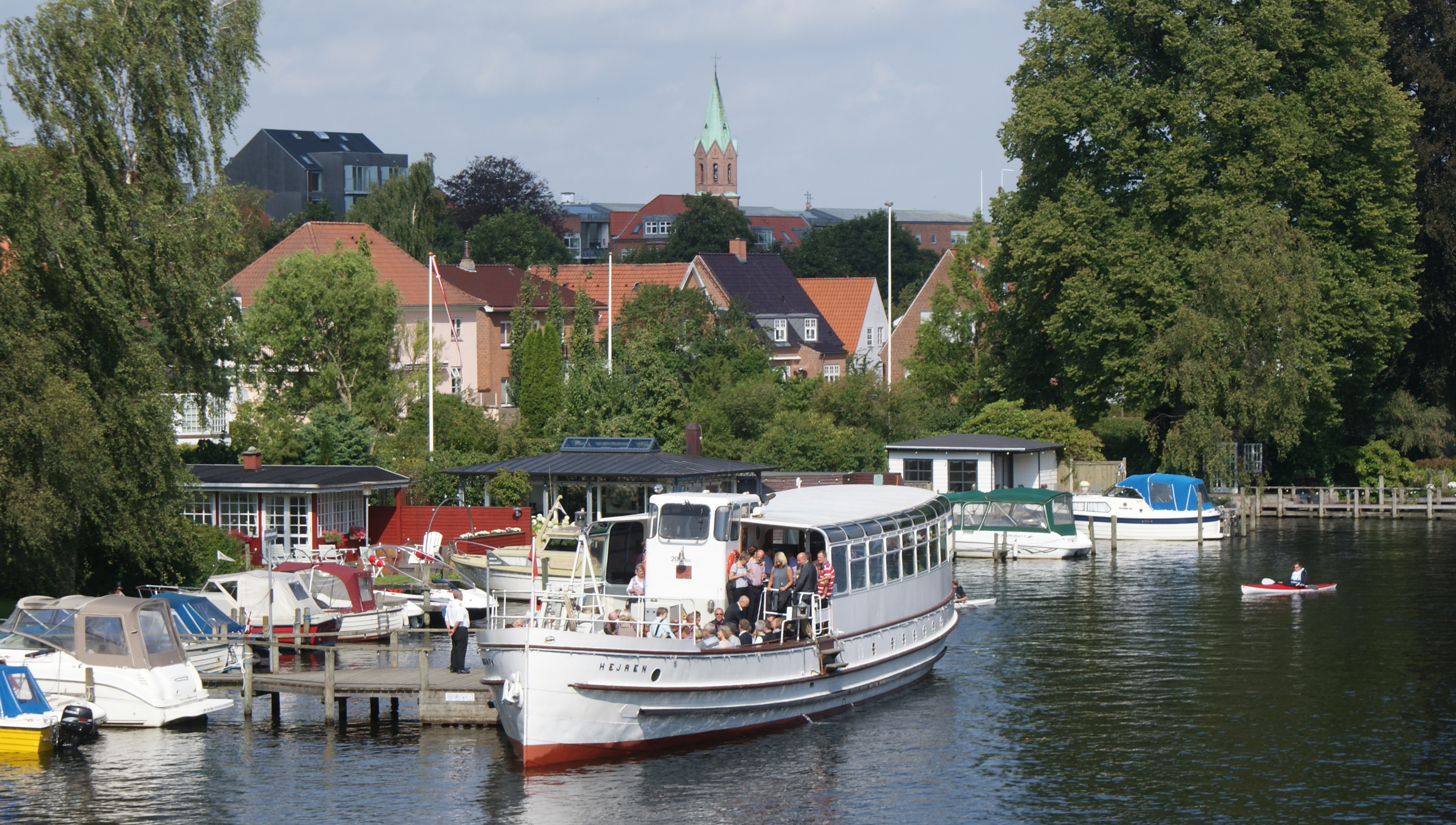
Silkeborg town, riverboat.

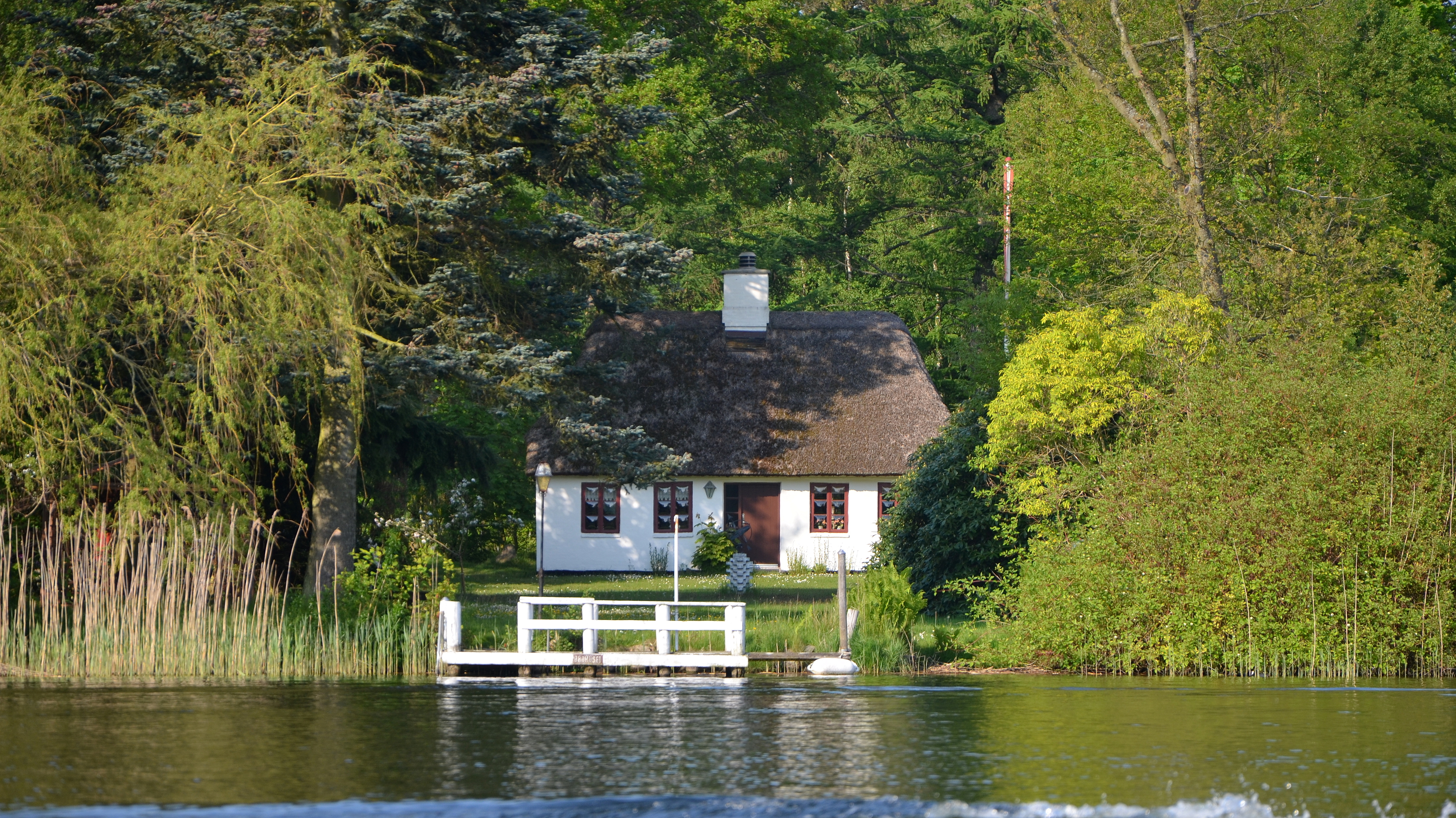
Silkeborg, old rural house.

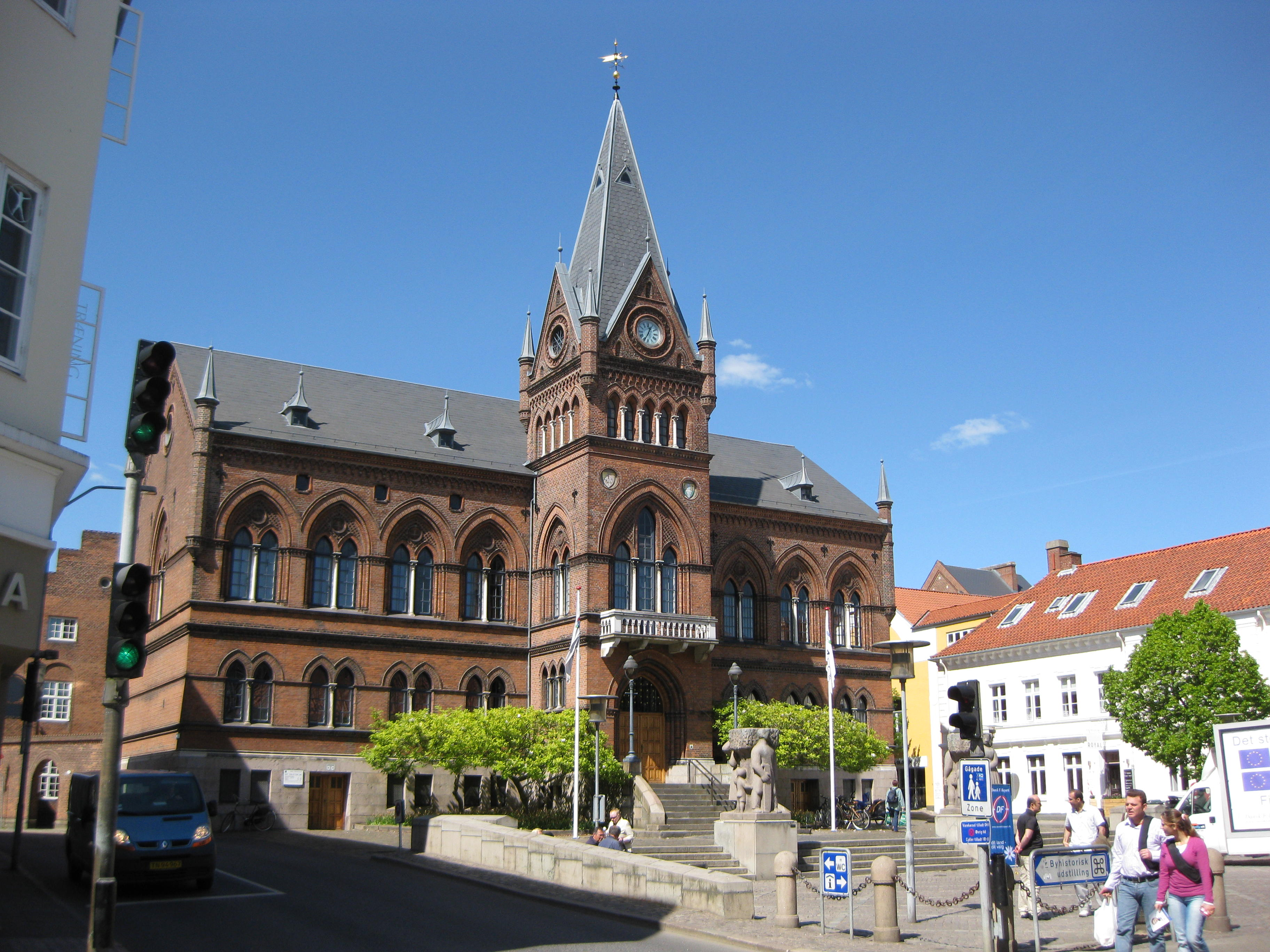
Vejle City Hall

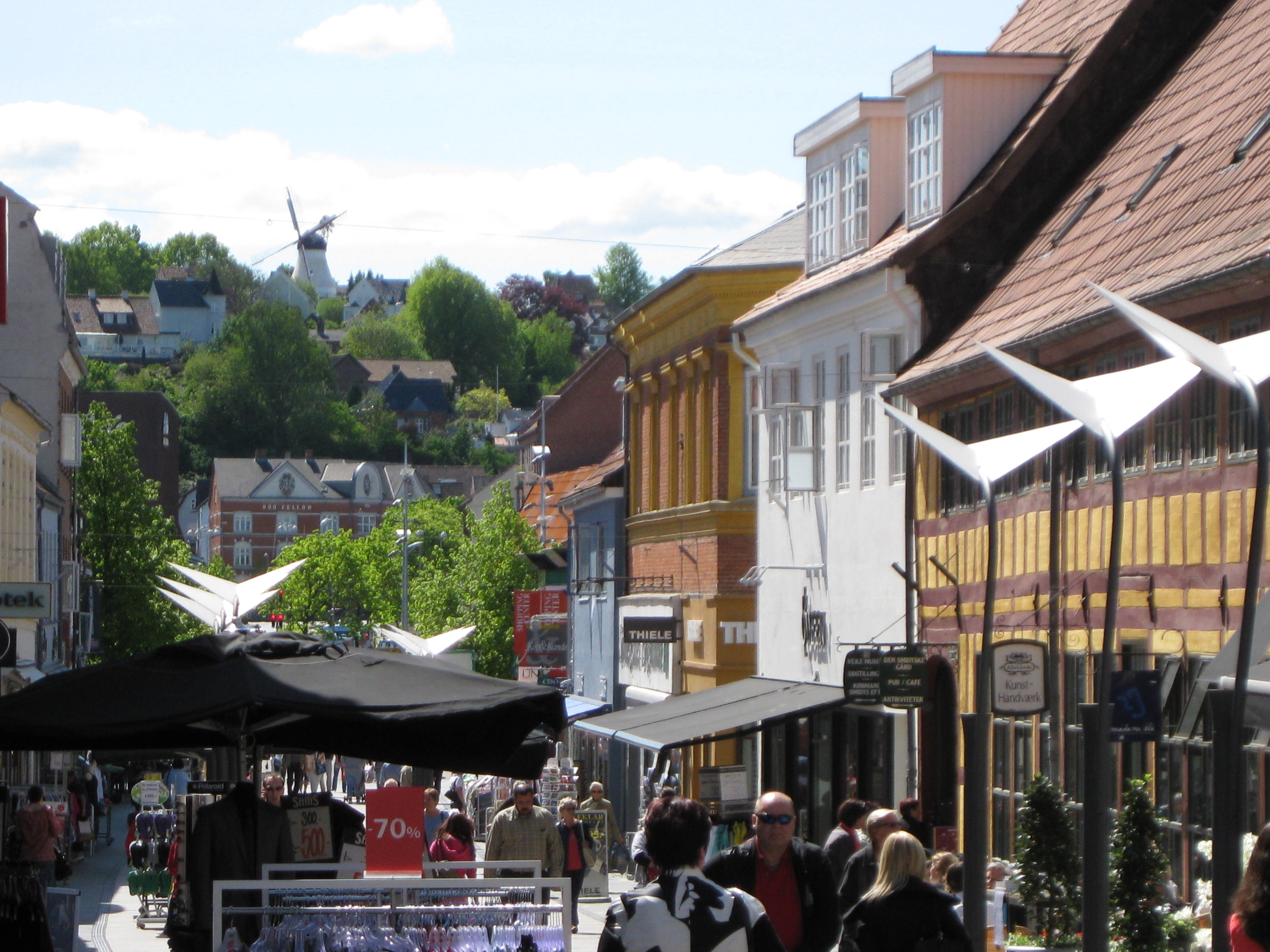
Vejle, high street

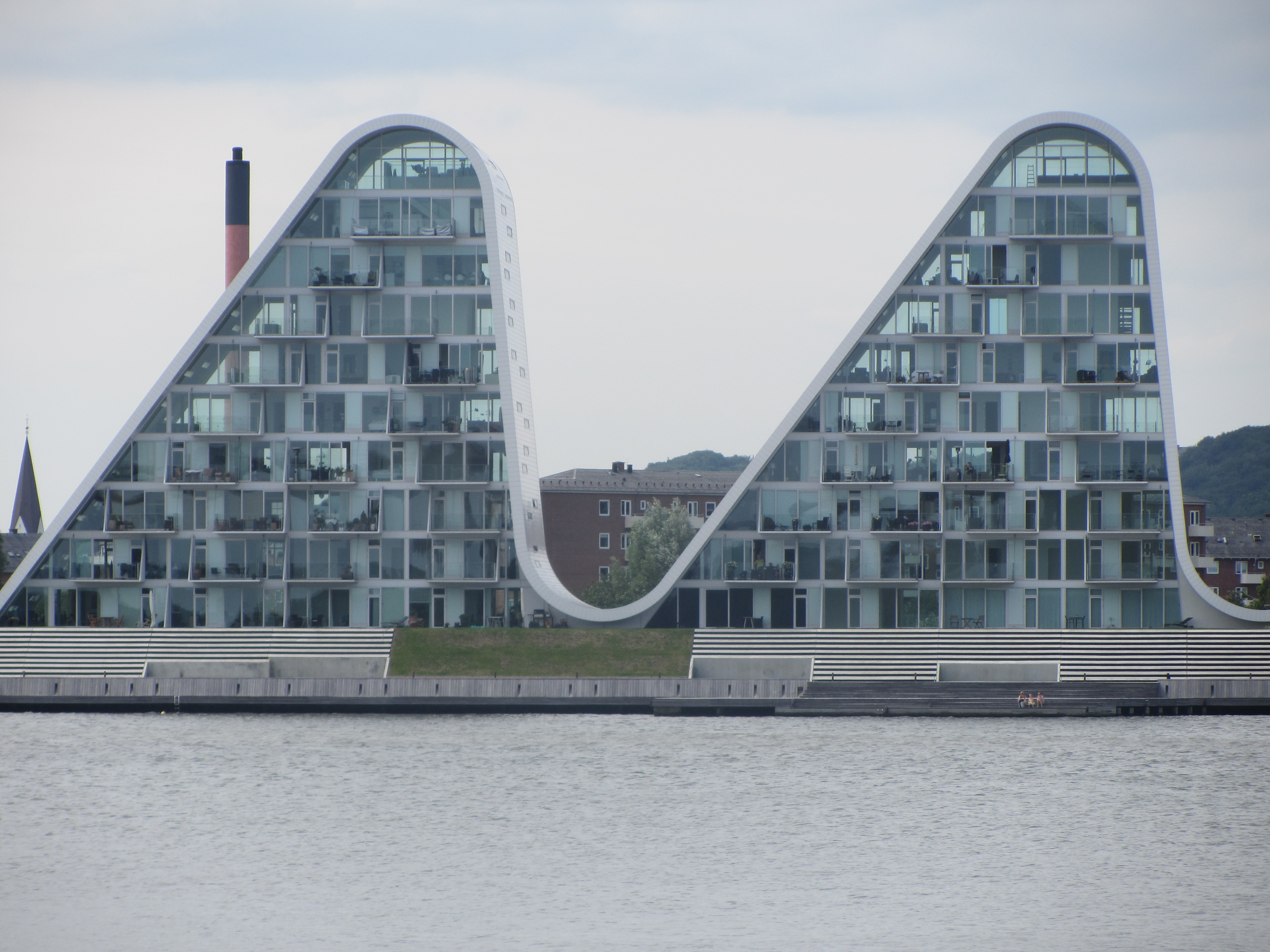
Vejle, modern architecture

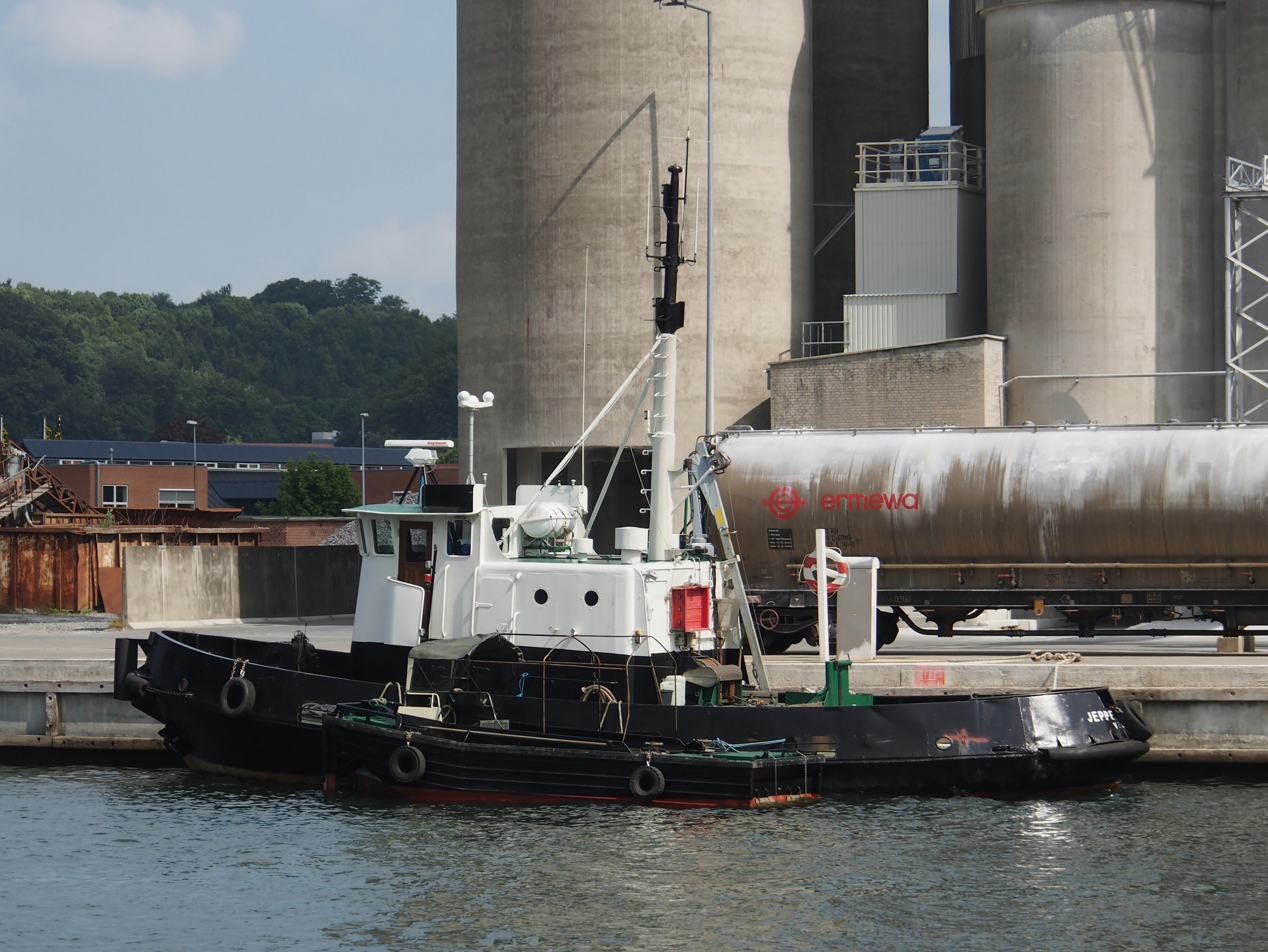
Vejle harbour

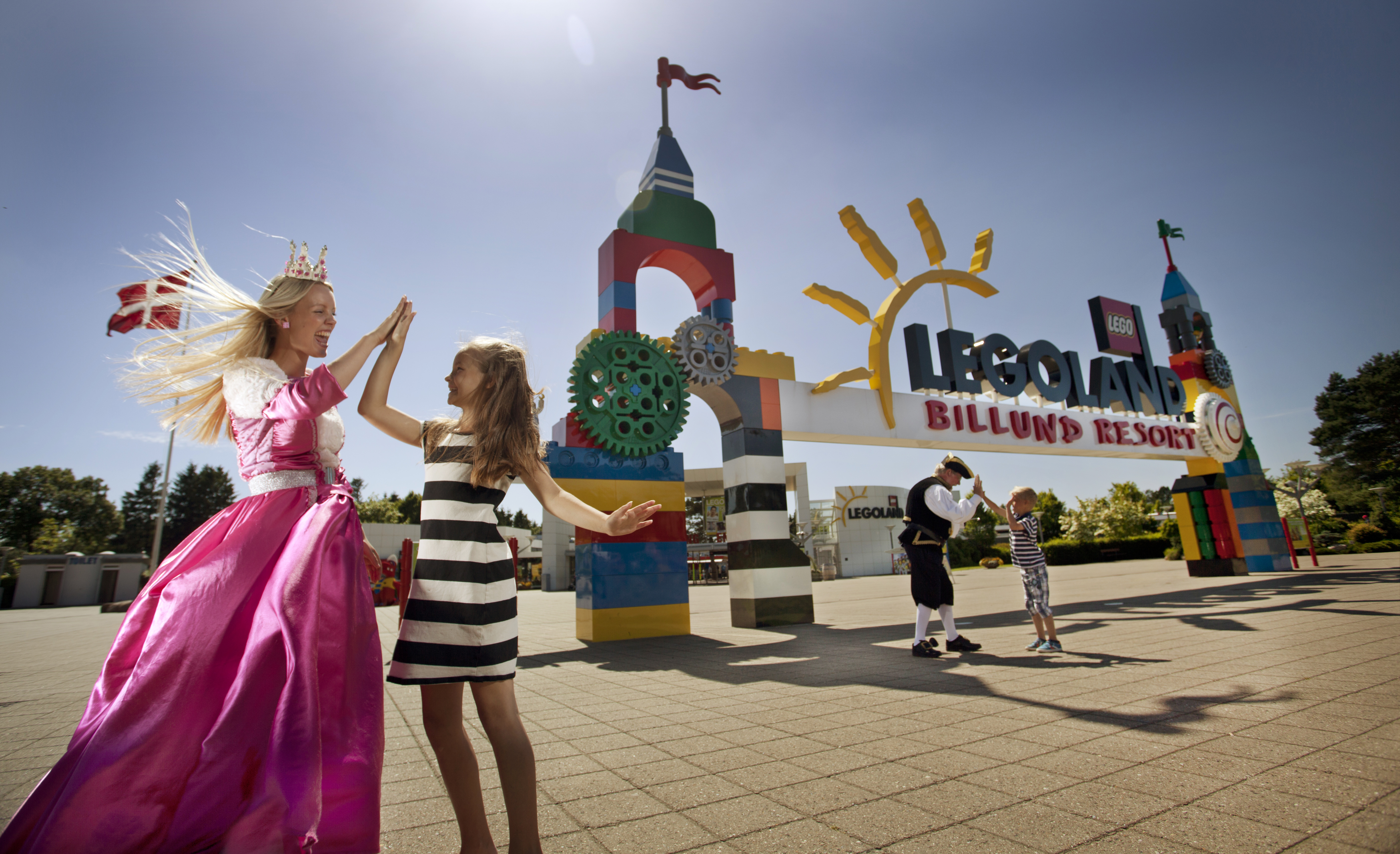
Billund, amusement park Legoland

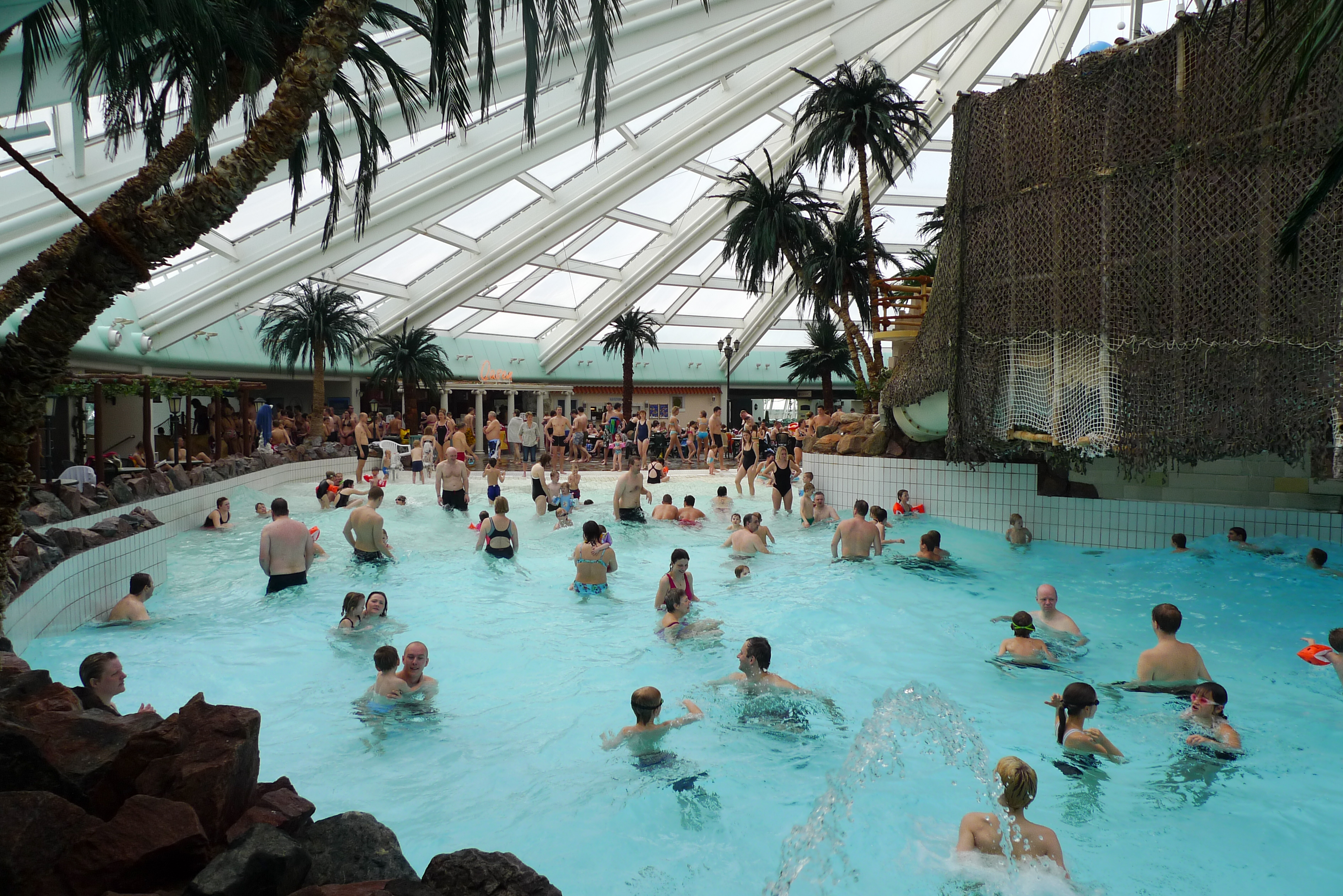
Billund, waterworld Lalandia

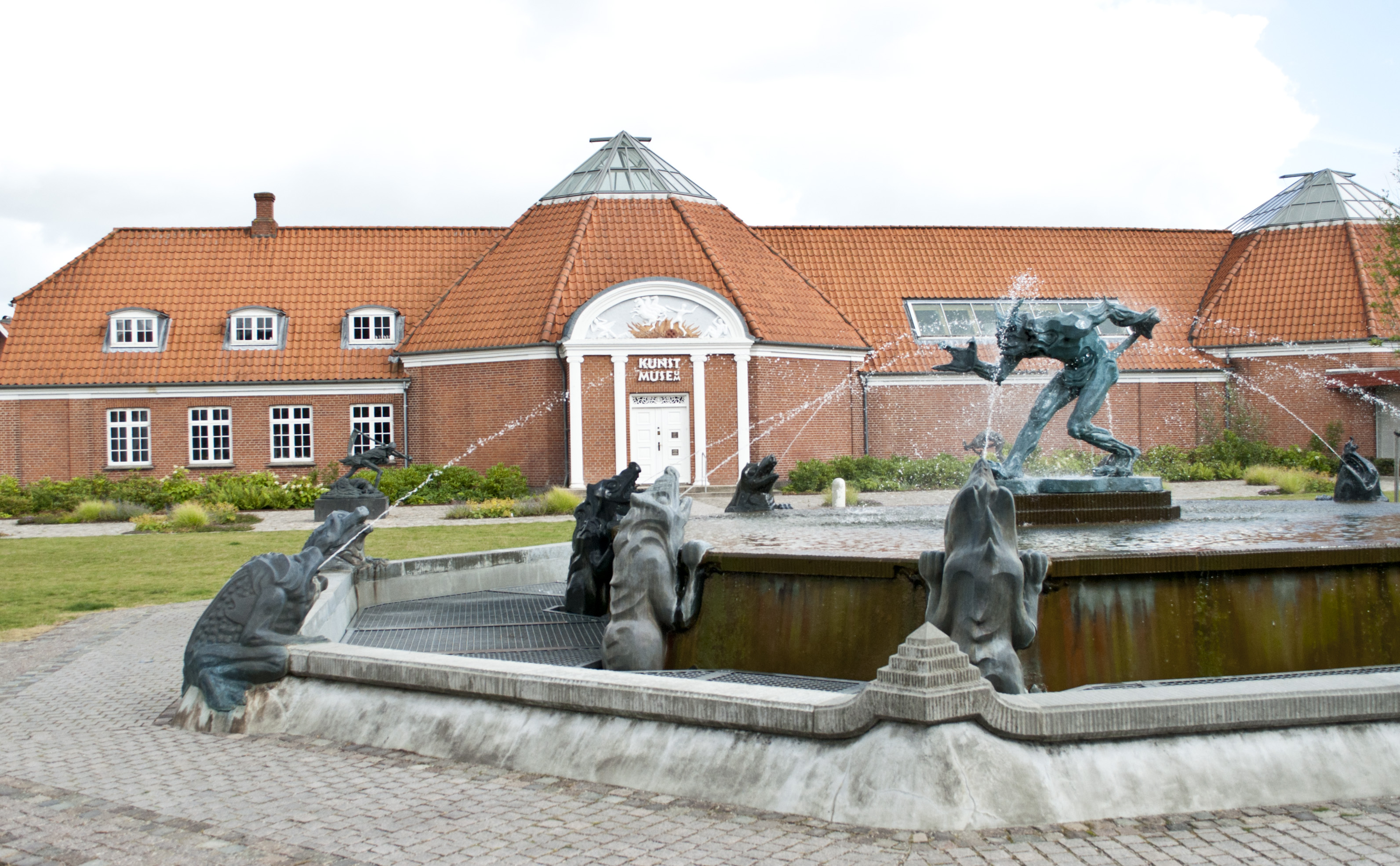
Vejen, troll fountain.

Landscapes and nature

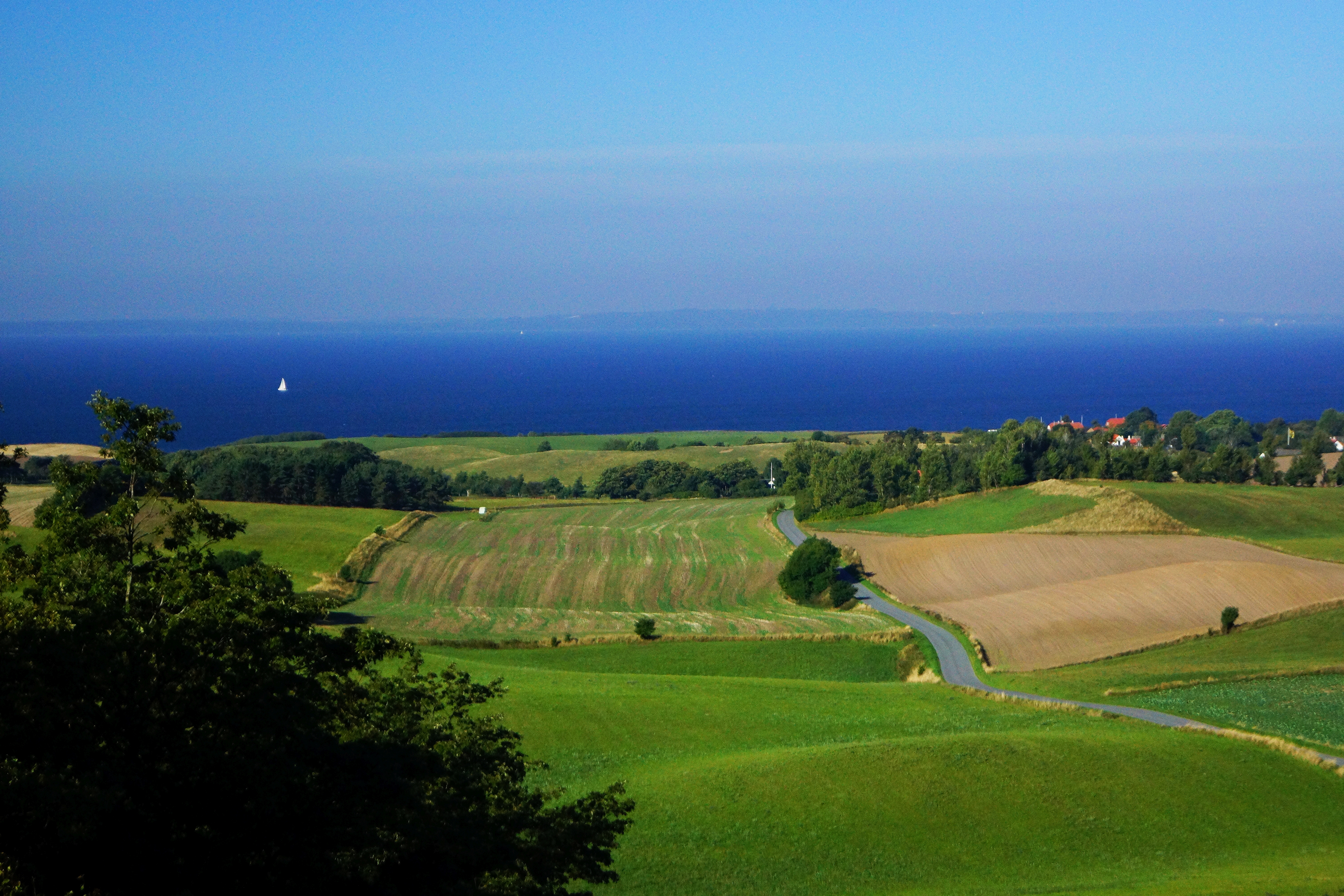
Djursland, landscape.

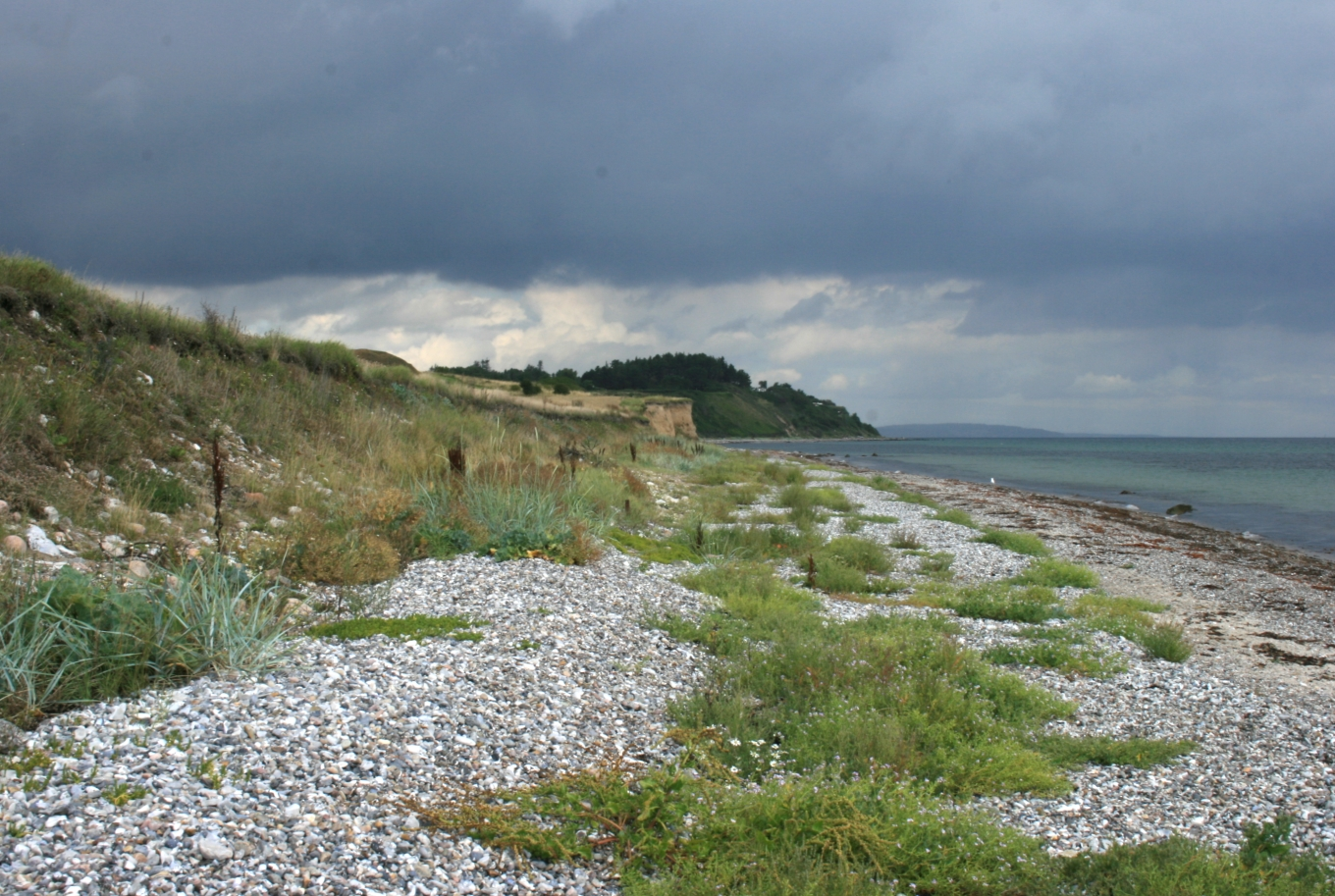
Djursland, coastal landscape

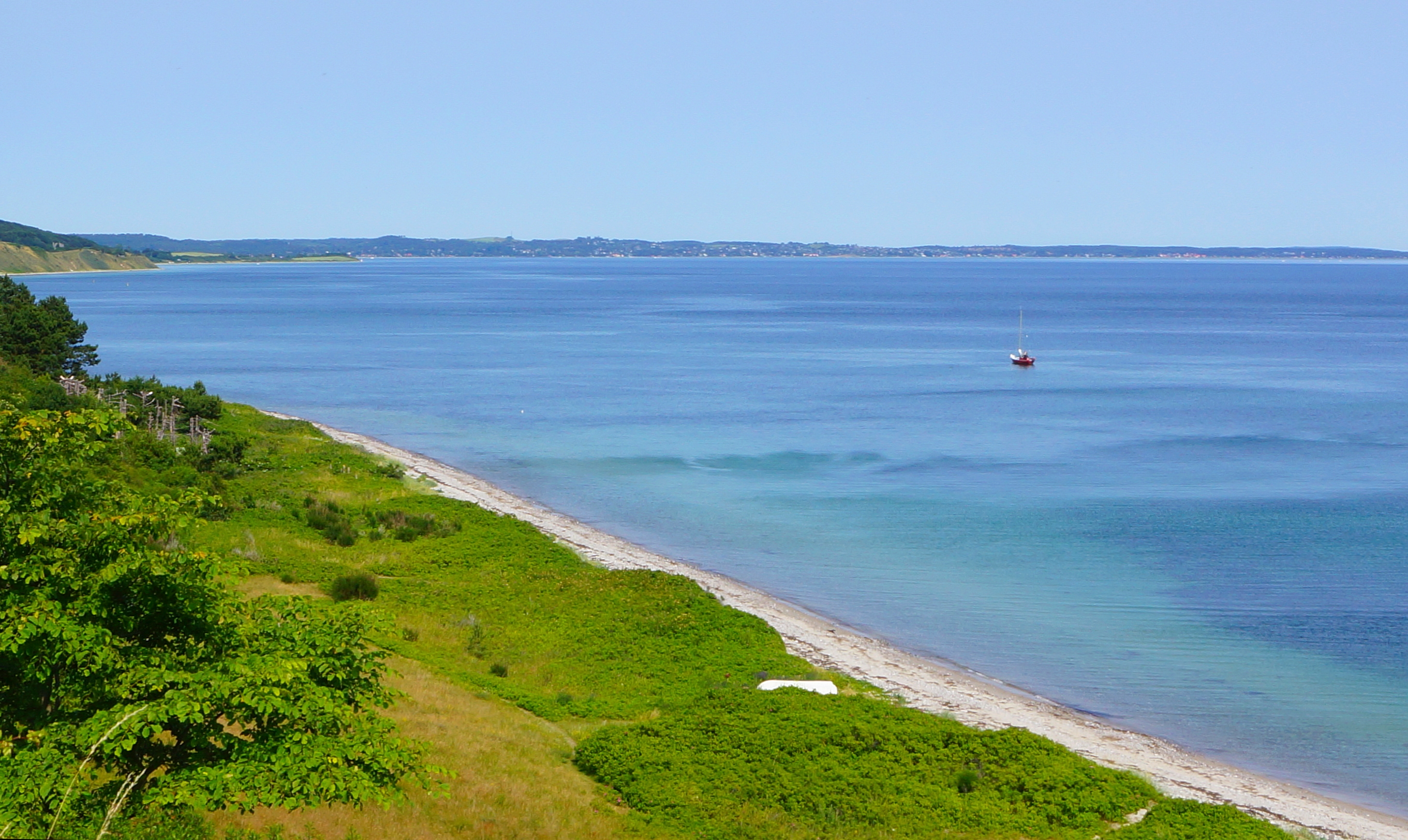
Djursland, one of many coves

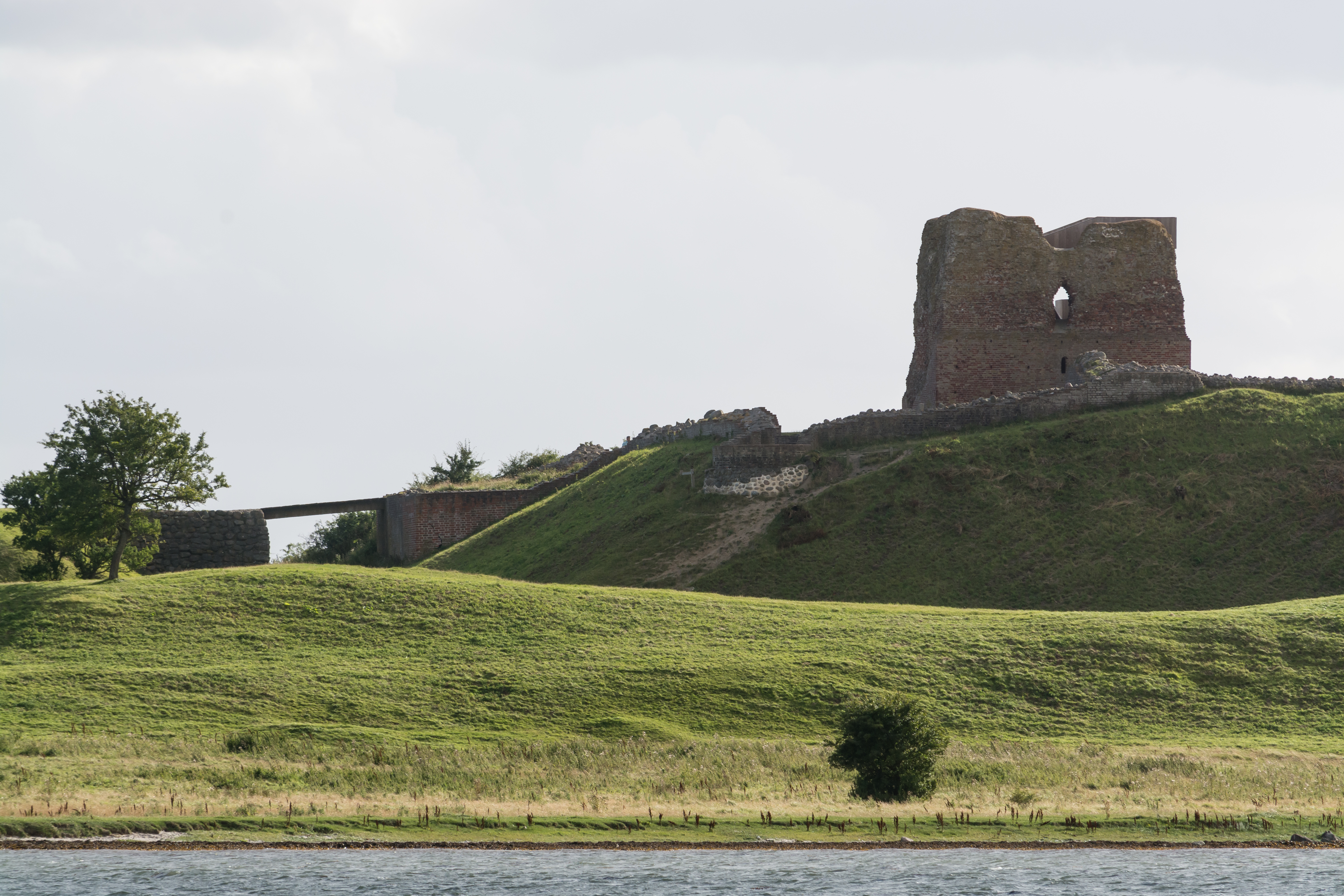
Syddjurs, Kalø Castle ruin.

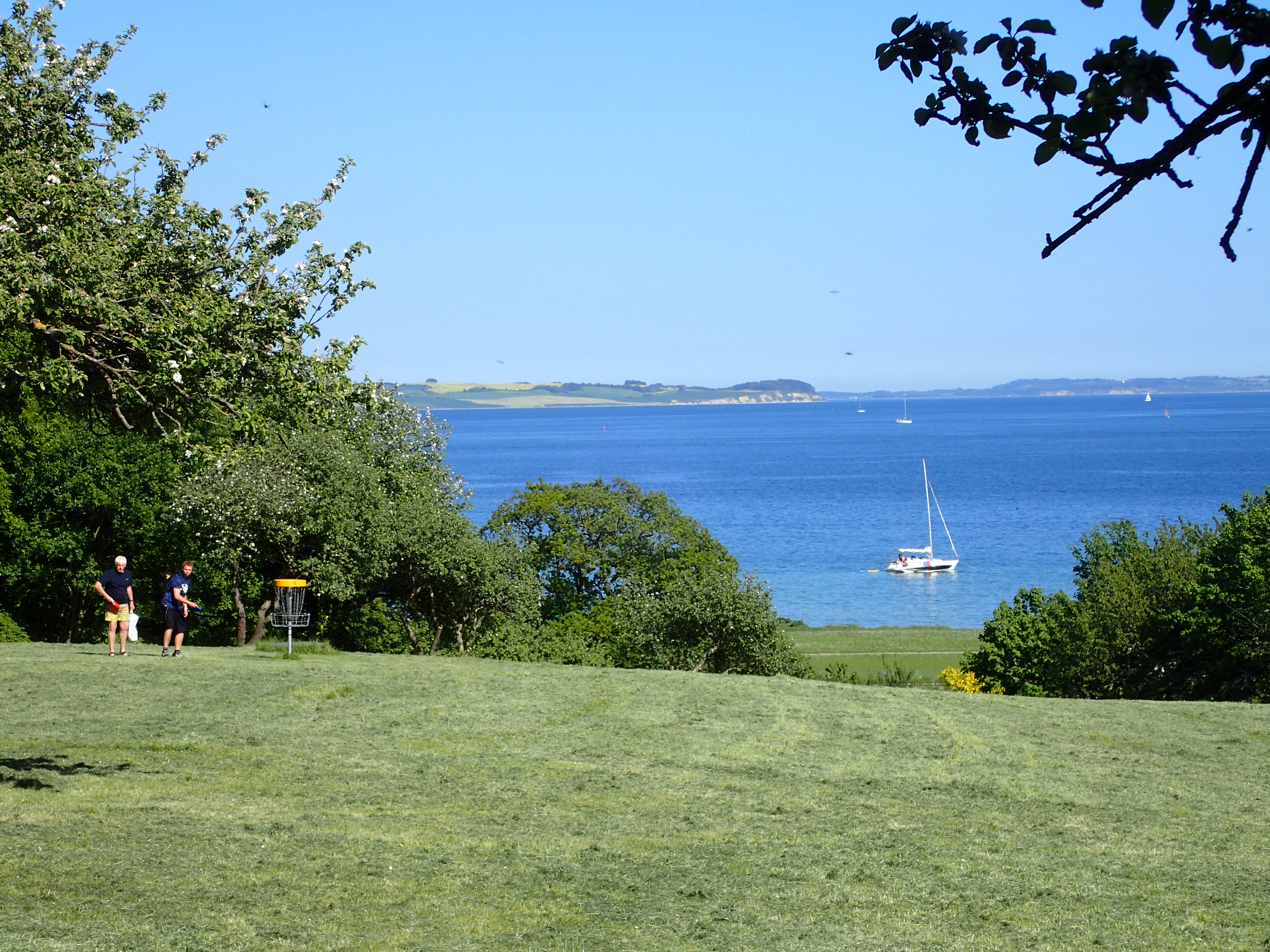
Aarhus Bay

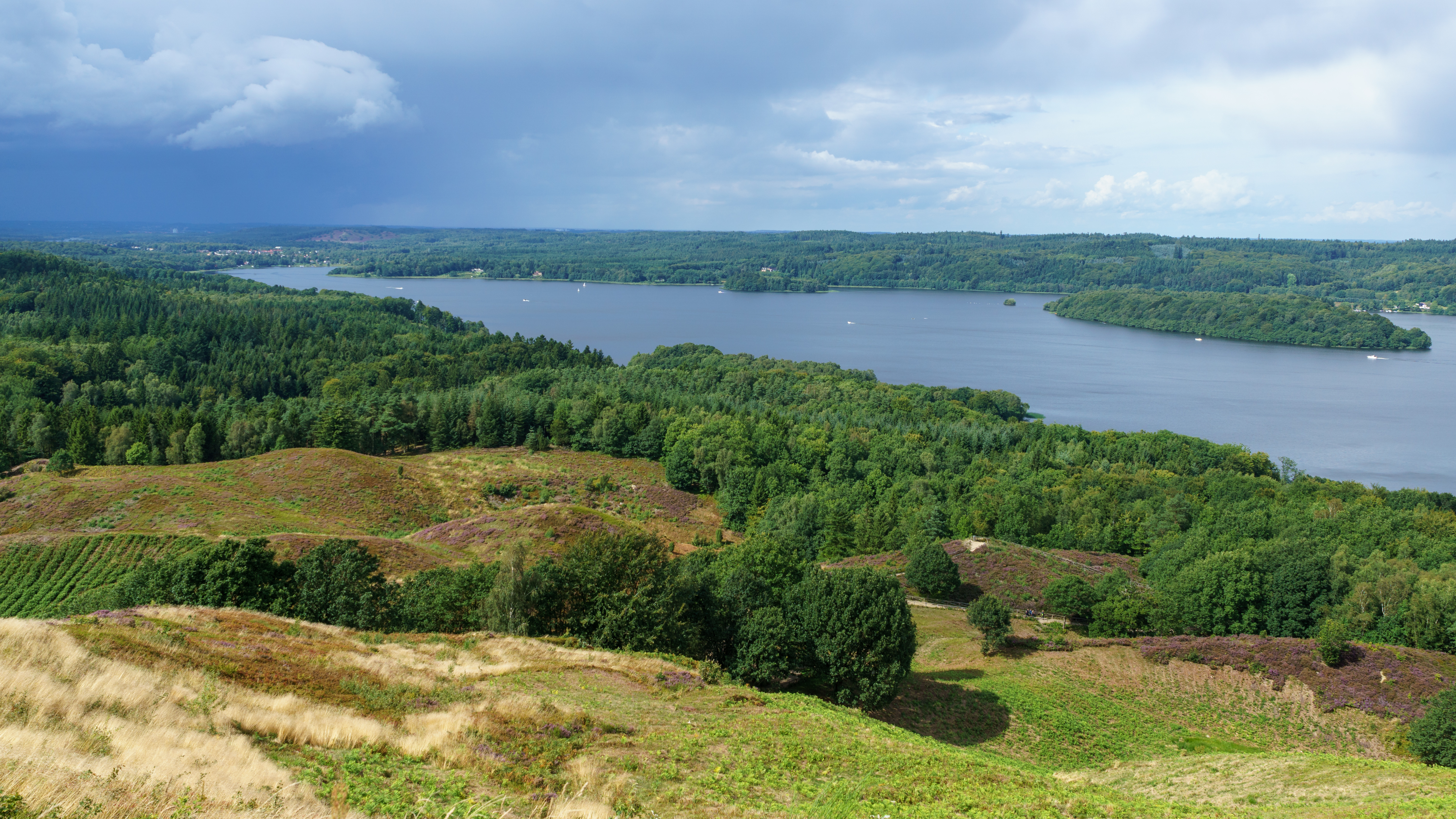
Silkeborg Municipality, landscape

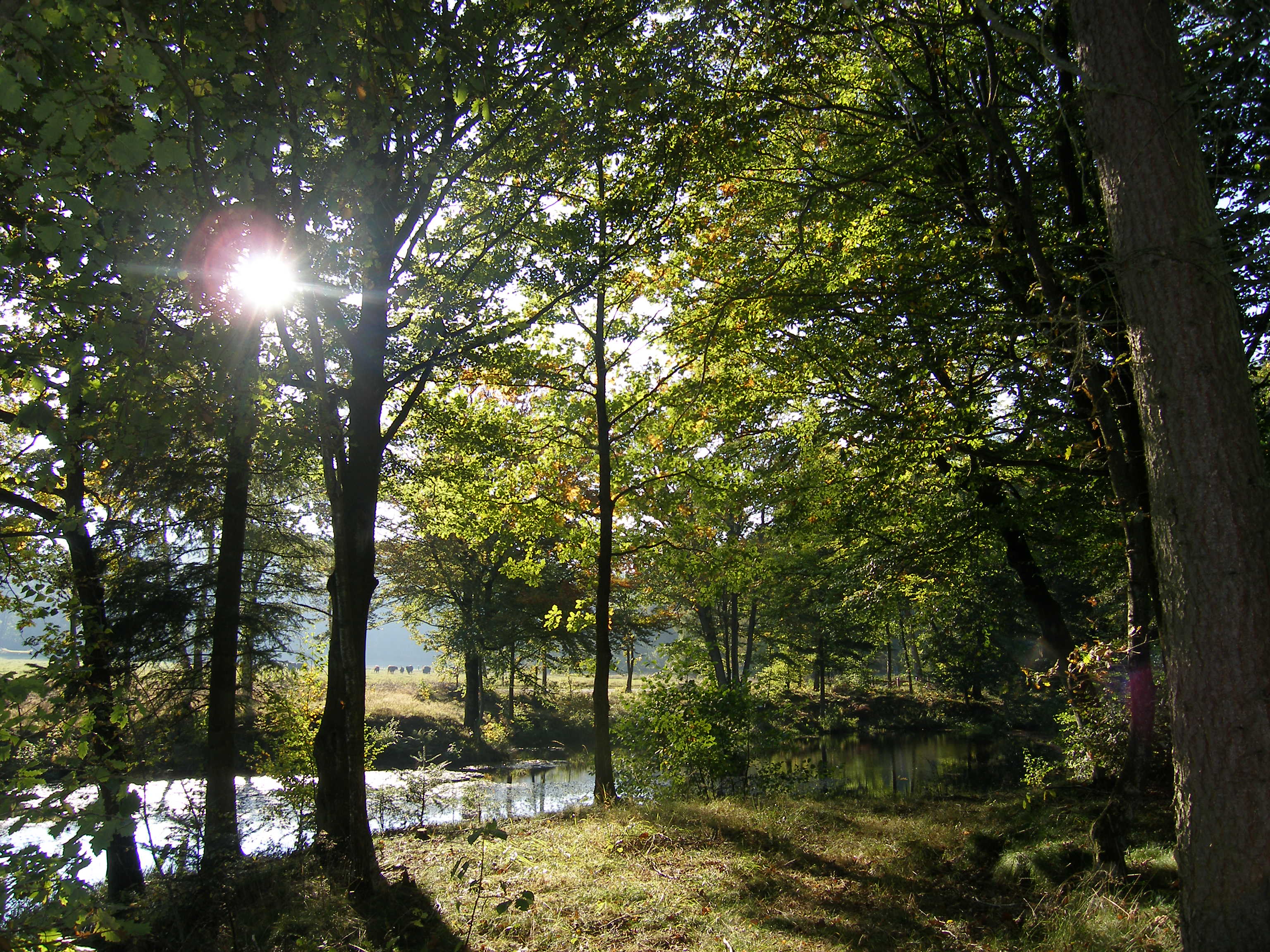
Silkeborg Forests

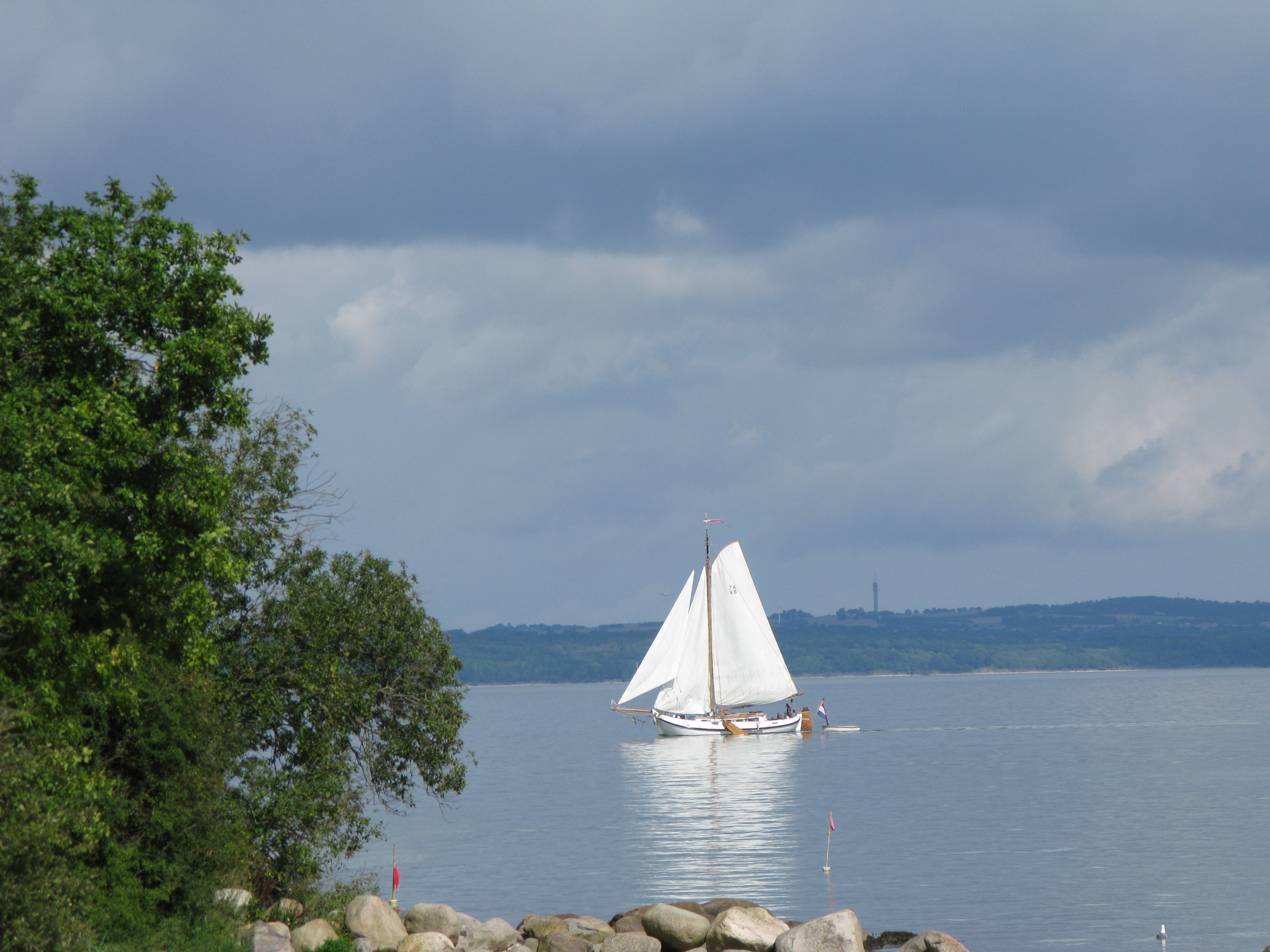
Vejle Fjord

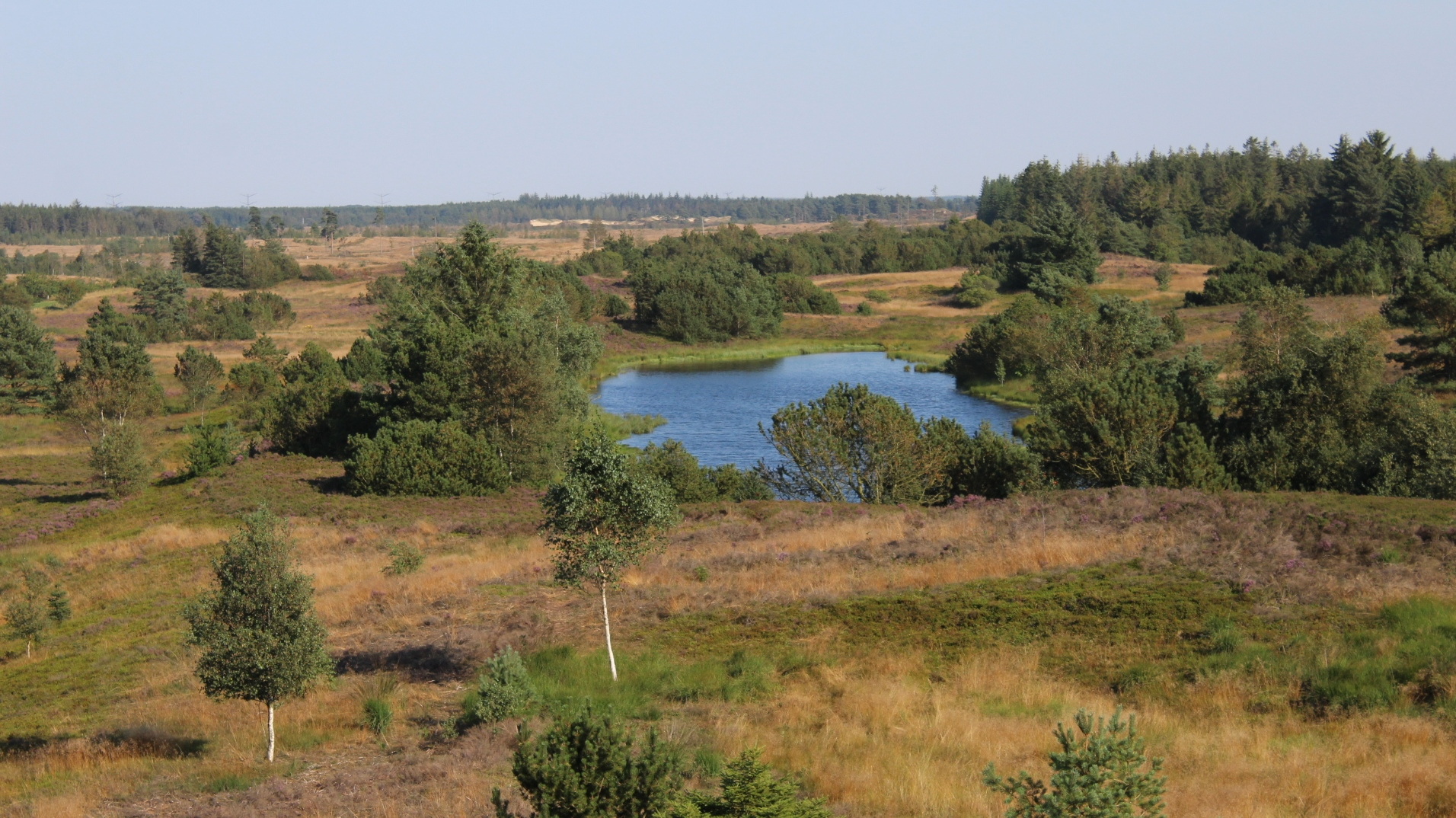
Billund, heathland

== See also ==
- Metropolitan areas of Denmark
- Largest urban areas in the Nordic countries

== Sources ==
- Henrik Mølgaard Frandsen (2017). "Aarhus Kommune og etableringen af en politisk ramme-struktur for den østjyske byregion" [Aarhus Municipality and the establishment of a political frame-structure for the East Jutland Metropolitan Region]. Erhvervshistorisk Årbog. 66 (1): 85–112. Historical account on the foundation and establishment of the region.
- Tom Nielsen and Boris Brorman Jensen (2017). Den Østjyske Millionby [The East Jutland Metropolis] (PDF) (in Danish). Dansk Byplanlaboratorium. Account and discussion on the idea of an East Jutland Metropolis (2006 to 2017).
- "Landsplanredegørelse 2013" [National Planning Report 2013] (in Danish). Danish Nature Agency. 2013.
- "Landsplanredegørelse 2006" [National Planning Report 2006] (in Danish). Danish Nature Agency. 2006.
- "Befolkningsforhold i Østjylland" [Demographics of East Jutland] (in Danish). By- og Landskabsstyrelsen. August 2008.
- Styregruppen for projekt Byudvikling i Østjylland (August 2008). "Vision Østjylland" (PDF) (in Danish). By- og Landskabsstyrelsen. Archived from the original (PDF) on 25 February 2009.
- Kristian Olesen (January 2008). "Den østjyske byregion" [The East Jutland city region]. Byplan (in Danish). 60 (2). Aalborg University: 18–20.
- Peter Bro and Henrik Harder (2007). "Fremtidens byudvikling i Østjylland" [Future urban development in East Jutland] (PDF). Trafikdage på Aalborg Universitet 2007 (in Danish). Aalborg University. Archived from the original (PDF) on 28 September 2007.
- https://web.archive.org/web/20070930143249/http://www.frinet.dk/infrastruktur2030 (in Danish)
