= List of churches in Samsø Municipality =

This list of churches in Samsø Municipality lists church buildings in Samsø Municipality, Denmark.

== National Churches ==
=== Besser Church ===
Besser Church
- Besser Kirke
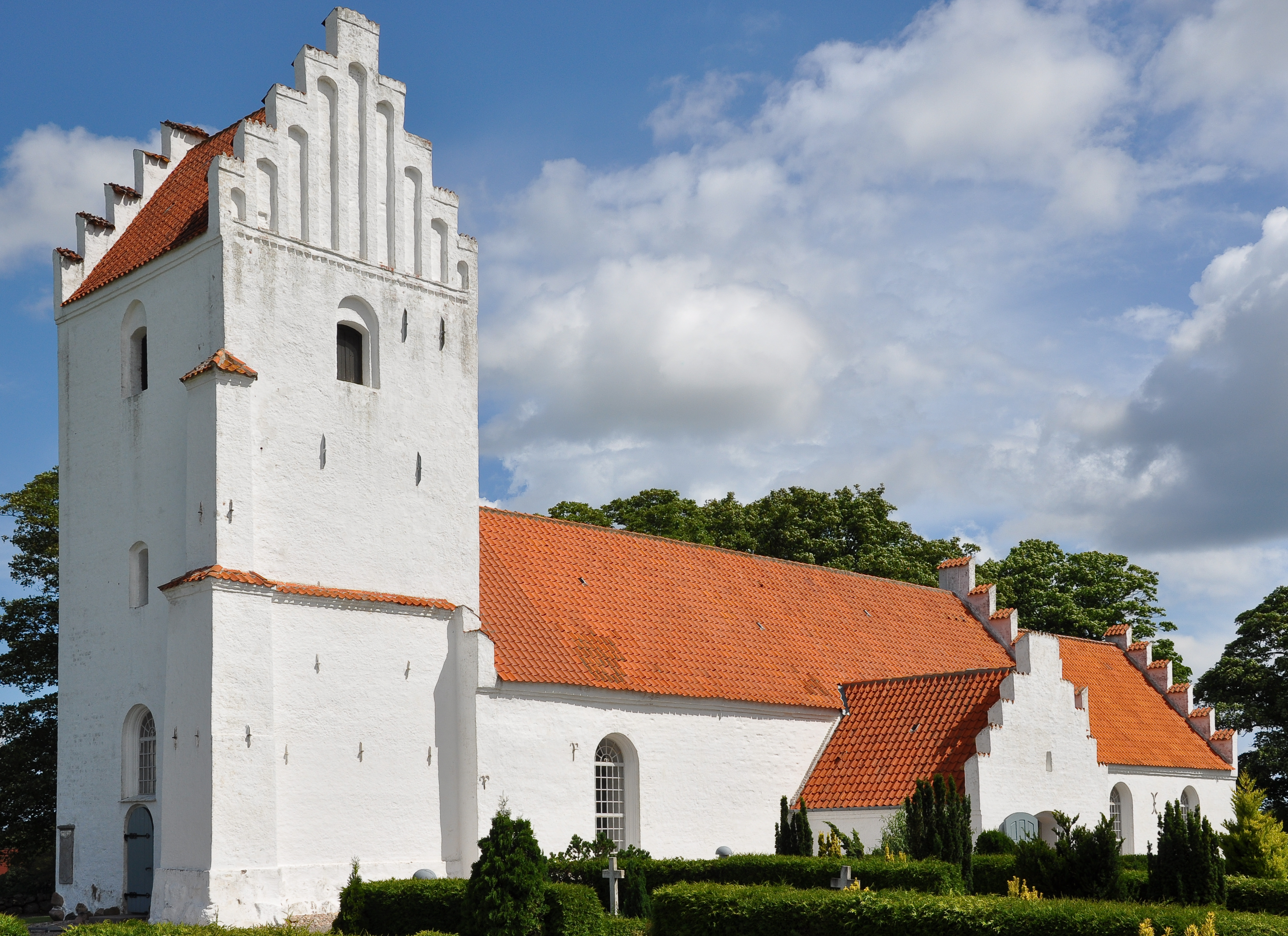
- Besser Church
- 55°51′8.45″N 10°37′47.09″E
- Denomination: Church of Denmark

History
- Founded: Ca. 1200

Administration
- Diocese: Diocese of Aarhus
- Deanery: Aarhus Provsti
- Parish: Samsø Parish

Besser Church is located 1 km south of Besser. It is one of seven national churches in Samsø Parish. The church has a churchyard with a cemetery.

Besser Church was built around year 1200.

The altarpiece is from 1589. A model ship from 1814 known as Fredens Minde hang in the church. The church bell is from 1782 and was made by Michael Carl Troschell in Copenhagen.

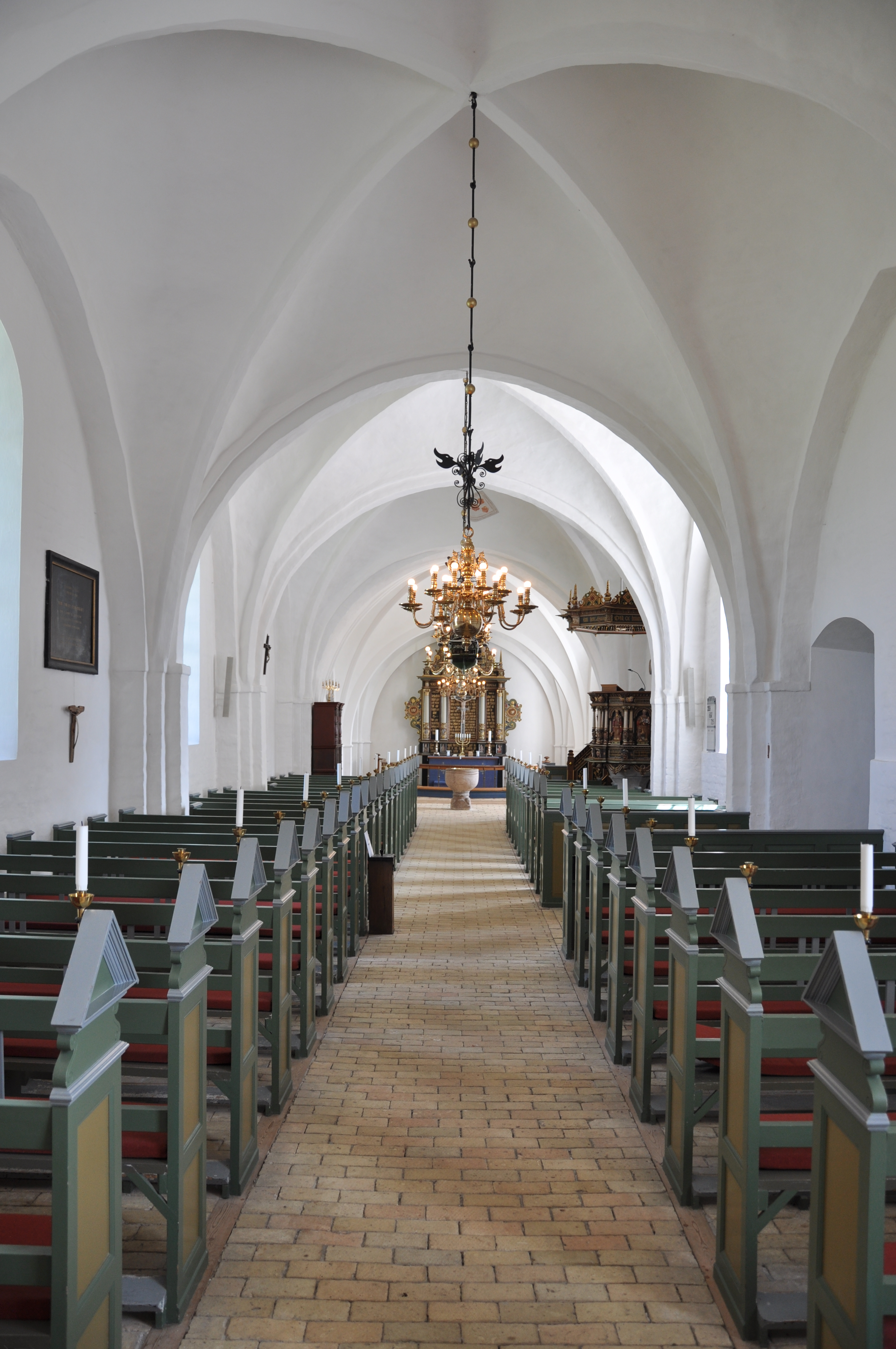
Church interior

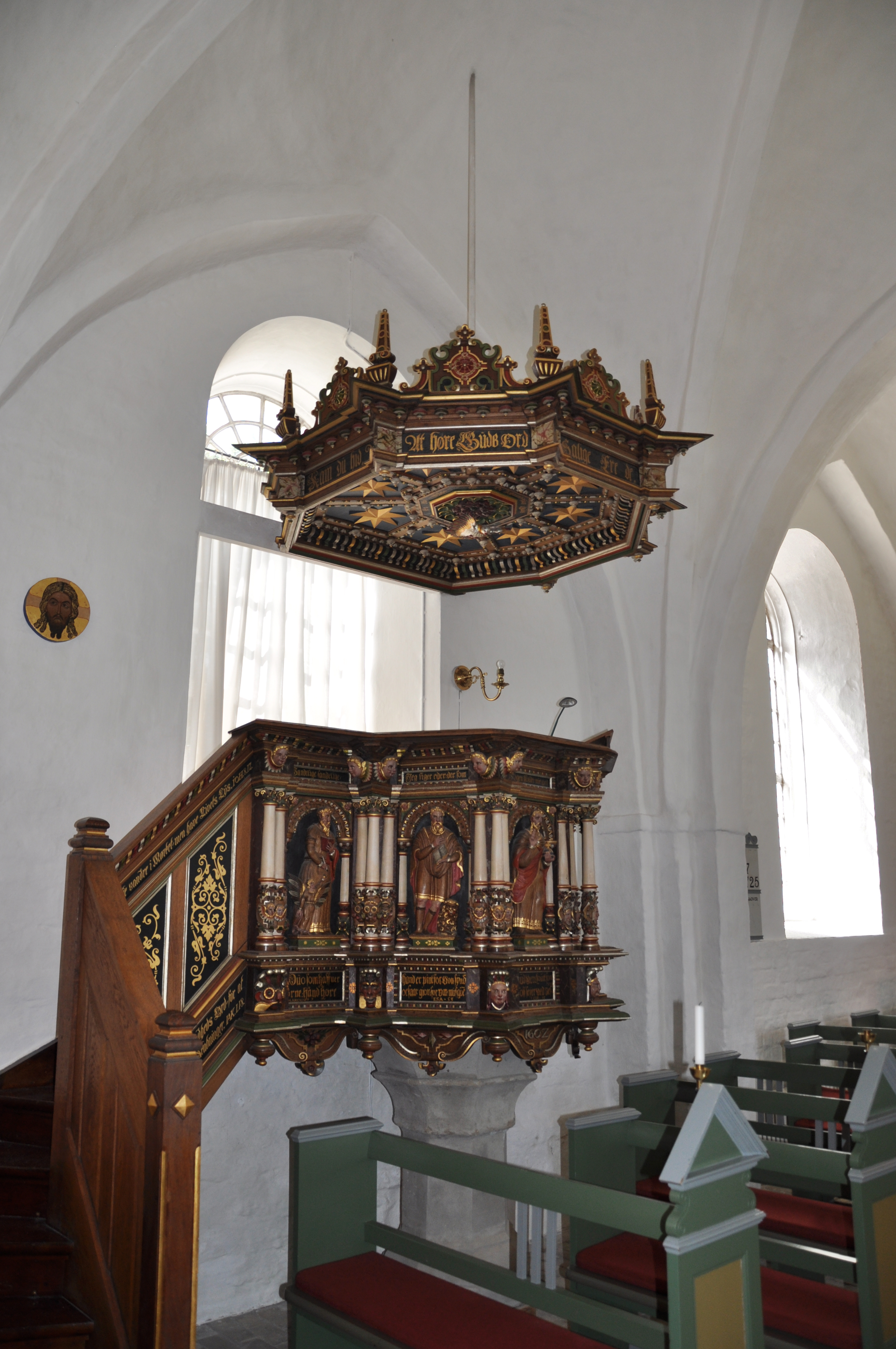
Pulpit

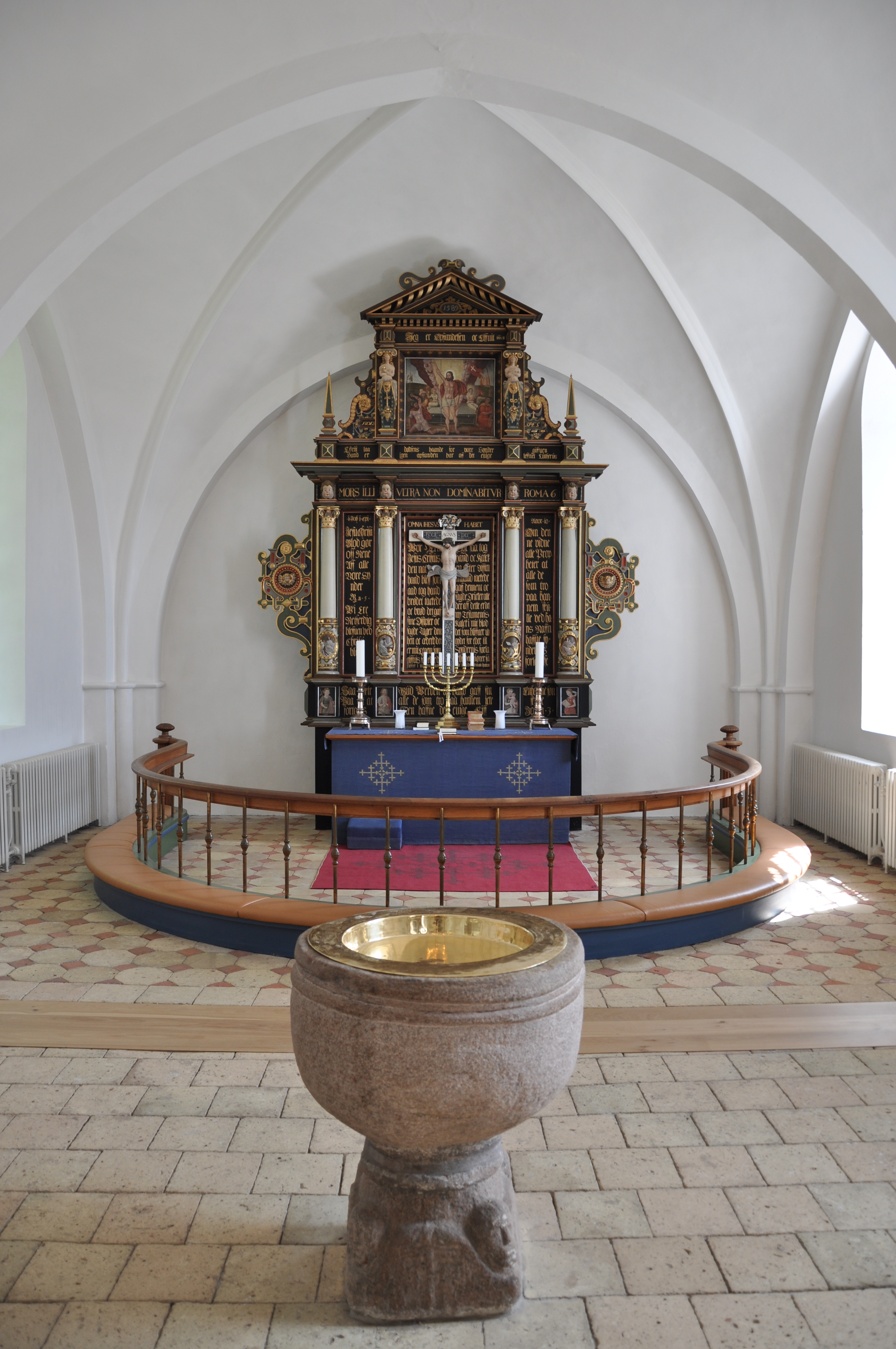
Altar

=== Kolby Church ===
Kolby Church
- Kolby Kirke
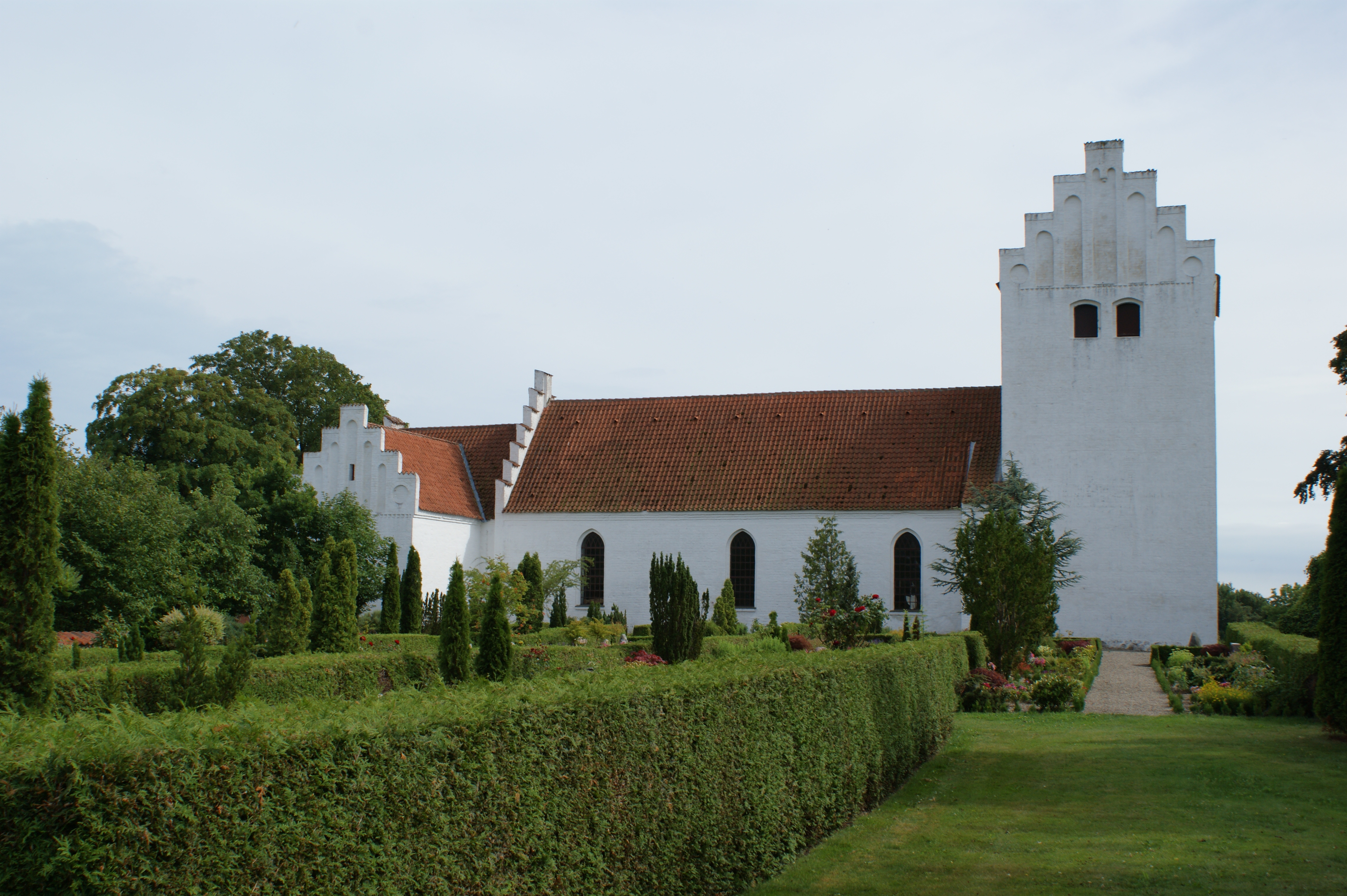
- Kolby Church
- 55°48′1.35″N 10°33′24.78″E
- Location: Kolby, Denmark
- Denomination: Church of Denmark

History
- Founded: 1200s

Administration
- Diocese: Diocese of Aarhus
- Deanery: Aarhus Provsti
- Parish: Samsø Parish

Kolby Church is located in Kolby. It is one of seven national churches in Samsø Parish. The church has a churchyard with a cemetery.

Kolby Church was built in the 1200s. The church has an associated mortuary from 1965 built by Ebbe Lehn Petersen.

=== Langør Church ===
Langør Church
- Langør Kirke
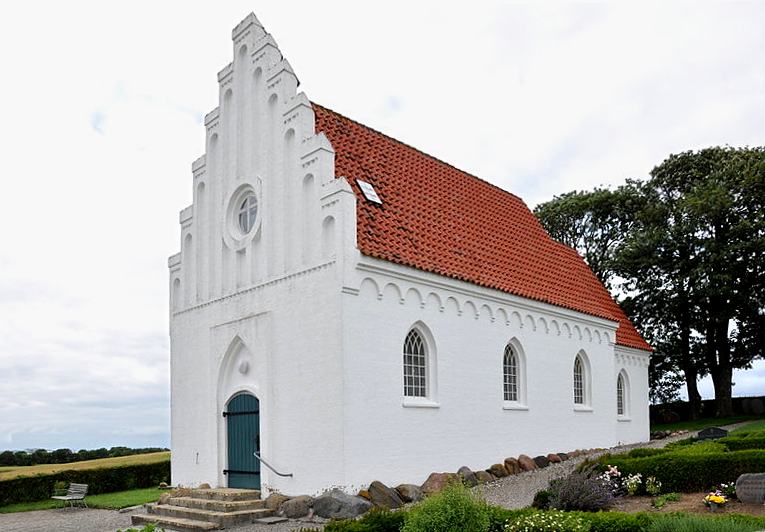
- Langør Church
- 55°55′7.58″N 10°38′0.52″E
- Denomination: Church of Denmark

Architecture
- Completed: 1925

Administration
- Diocese: Diocese of Aarhus
- Deanery: Aarhus Provsti
- Parish: Samsø Parish

Langør Church is located 1 km north of Langør. It is one of seven national churches in Samsø Parish. The church has a churchyard with a cemetery.

Langør Church was built between 1924 and 1925 by H. Thirstrup, M.S. Snedker, Anthon Sørensen and J.J. Jensen, all from Samsø. With the exception of the church's votive ship, all the inventory of the church is from 1924 to 1925. The votive ship is from 1933.

=== Nordby Church ===
Nordby Church
- Nordby Kirke
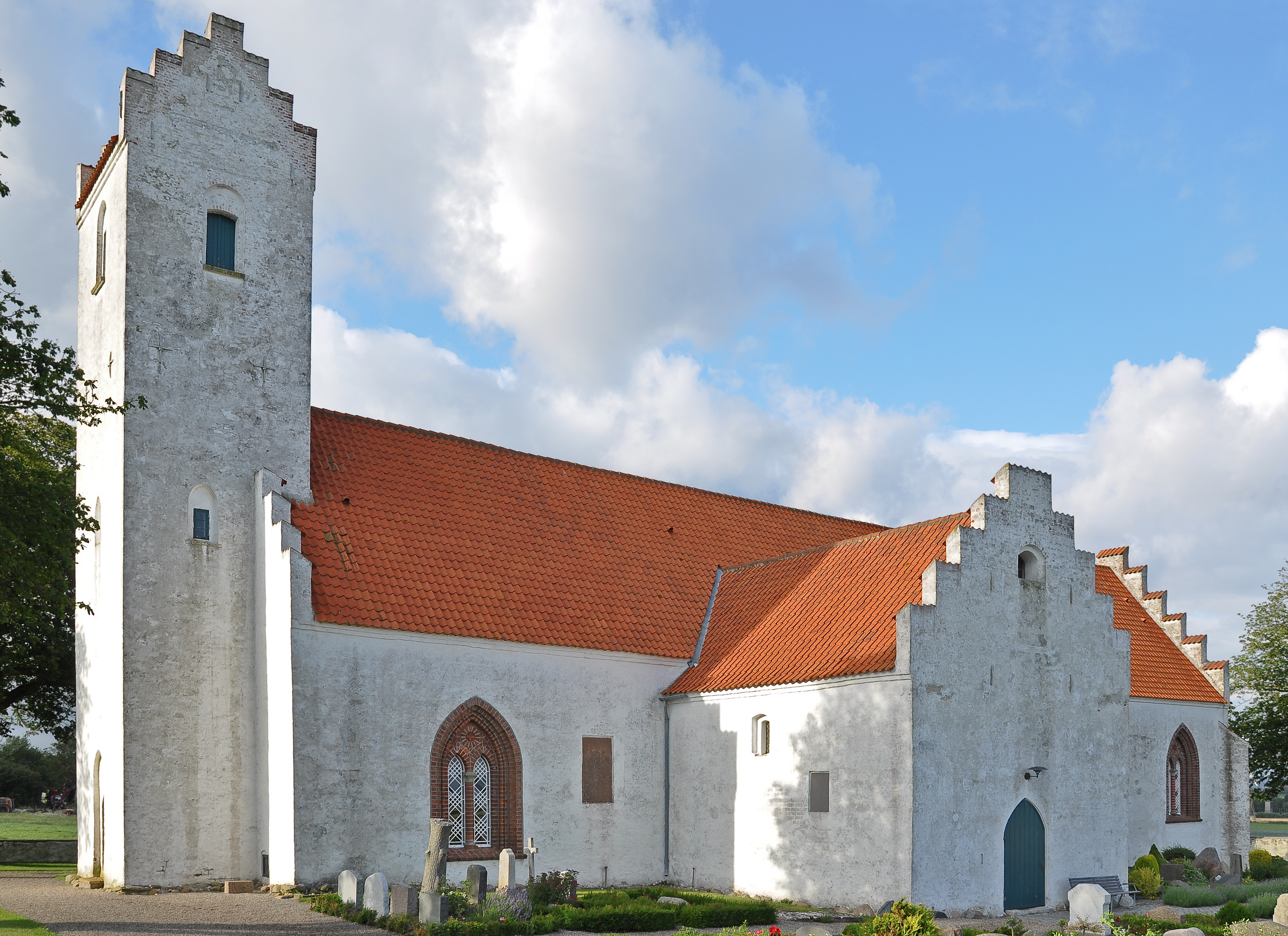
- Nordby Church
- 55°57′5.24″N 10°32′47.52″E
- Denomination: Church of Denmark

History
- Founded: 1200s

Administration
- Diocese: Diocese of Aarhus
- Deanery: Aarhus Provsti
- Parish: Samsø Parish

Nordby Church is located 1 km south-west of Nordby and 1 km north-west of Mårup. It is one of seven national churches in Samsø Parish. The church has a churchyard with a cemetery.

Nordby Church is located east of Nordby Hills and Møgelskår. The reason for its remote location is that it used to be the church of Nordby and Mårup, as well as two villages that no longer exist: Søby and Glistrup. The church was built in the 1200s, but rebuilt several times. First in the 1300s, then in the 1400s and the 1500s. Due to the church's remote location, a bell tower is located in the center of Nordby, the current version being from 1857.

A cabinet in the church is from 1519, and was in 1875 gifted to Brattingsborg, where they in 1923 promised to donate the cabinet to the Danish National Museum. When the owner of the manor died, the cabinet was however handed back to the church, and it still stands there.

=== Onsbjerg Church ===
Onsbjerg Church
- Onsbjerg Kirke
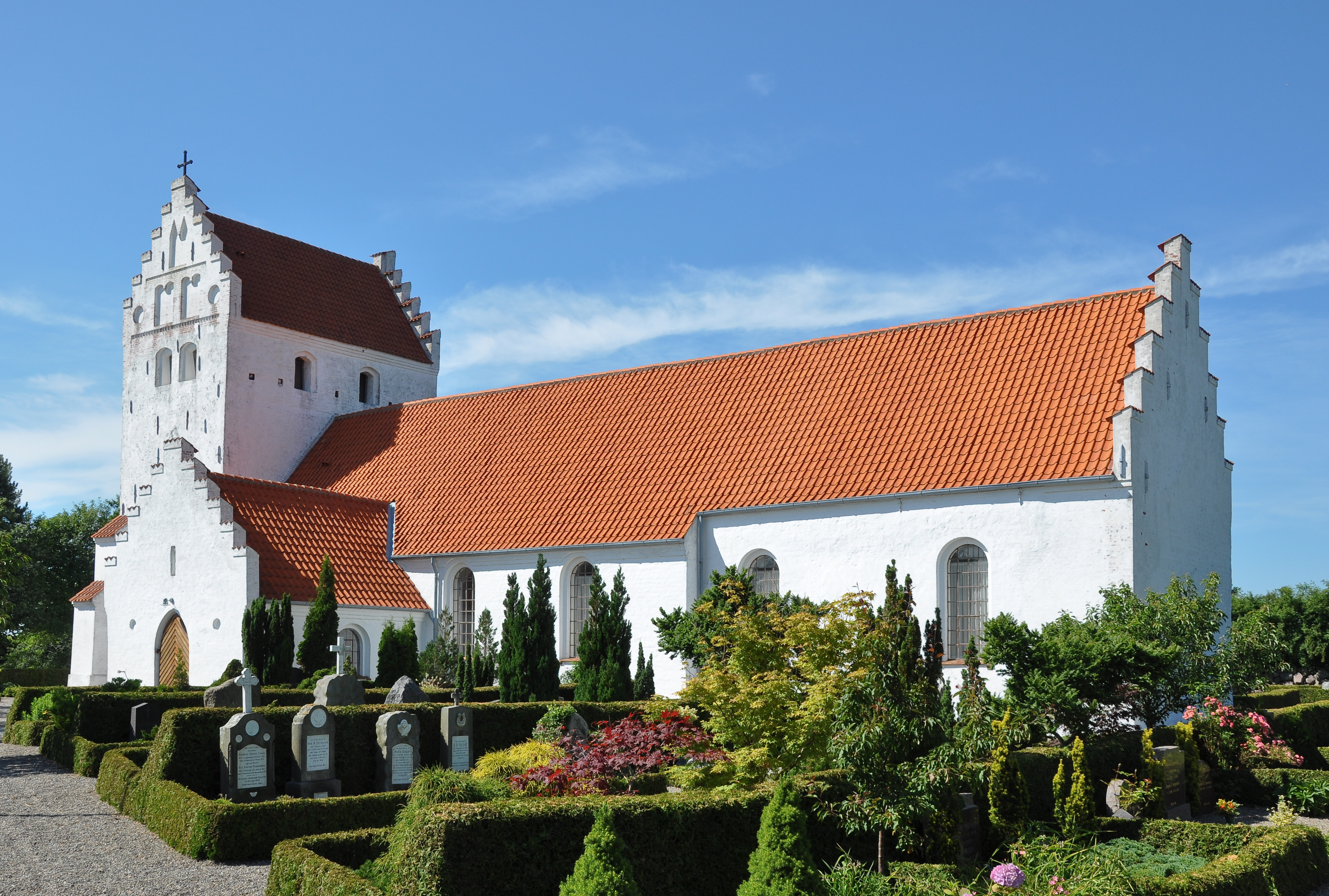
- Onsbjerg Church
- 55°50′59.72″N 10°34′4.27″E
- Location: Onsbjerg, Denmark
- Denomination: Church of Denmark

History
- Founded: 1200s

Administration
- Diocese: Diocese of Aarhus
- Deanery: Aarhus Provsti
- Parish: Samsø Parish

Onsbjerg Church (also known as Holy Cross Church. Danish: Hellig Kors Kirke) is located in Onsbjerg. It is one of seven national churches in Samsø Parish. The church has a churchyard with a cemetery.

Onsbjerg Church was built in the 1200s.

The altarpiece is from 1596.

=== Tranebjerg Church ===
Tranebjerg Church
- Tranebjerg Kirke
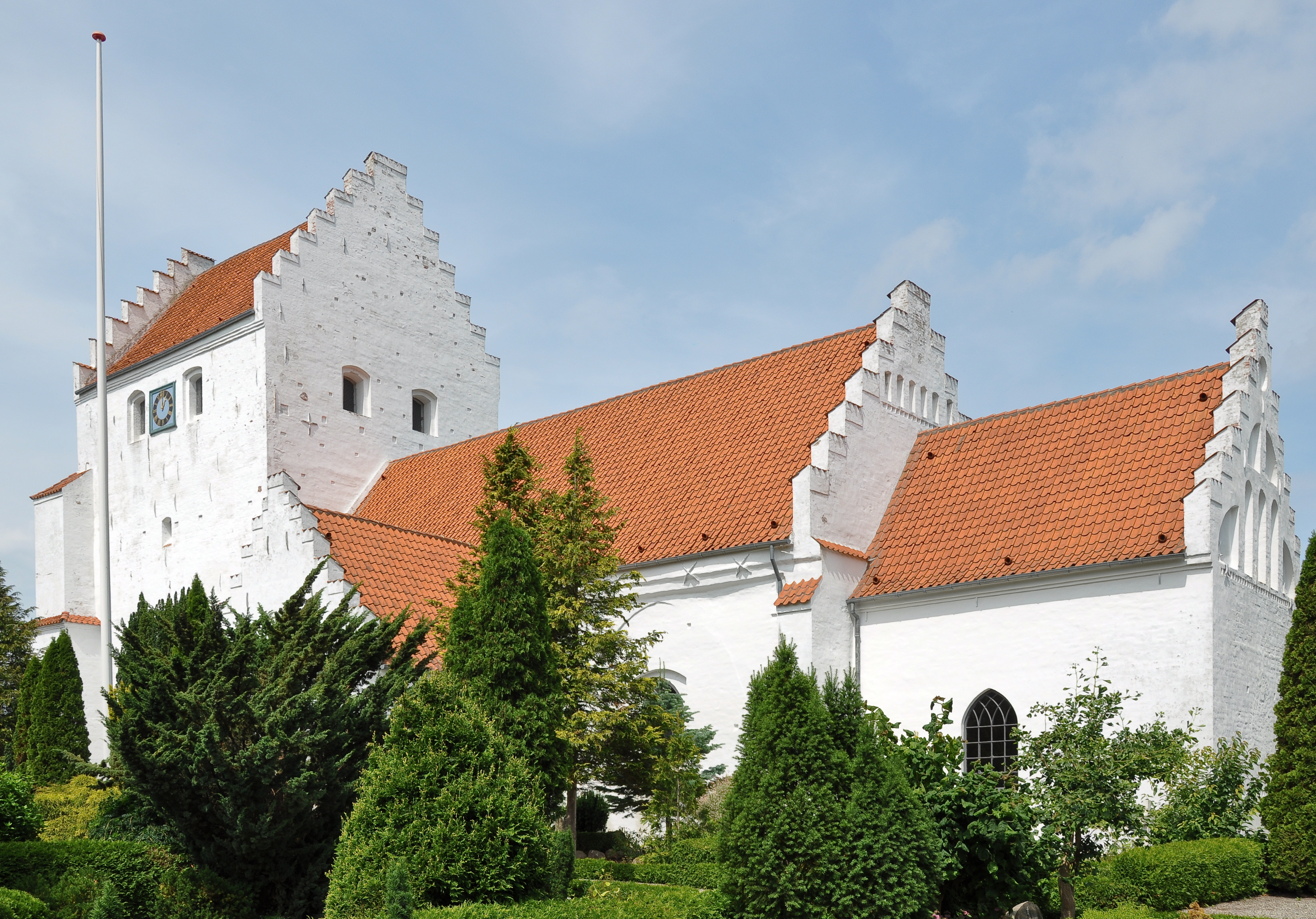
- Tranebjerg Church
- 55°50′4.78″N 10°35′12.26″E
- Location: Onsbjerg, Denmark
- Denomination: Church of Denmark

History
- Founded: 1300s

Administration
- Diocese: Diocese of Aarhus
- Deanery: Aarhus Provsti
- Parish: Samsø Parish

Tranebjerg Church is located in Tranebjerg. It is one of seven national churches in Samsø Parish. The church has a churchyard with a cemetery.

Tranebjerg Church was built in the late 1300s. The church has several embrasures, which indicate that the church has had a defensive role in the town. The church went through a significant restoration between 1866 and 1869, where all windows in the church was also replaced.

The altarpiece is from 1615. There are two organs in the church, one from 1954 built in Kongens Lyngby, the other from 1909 and built in Horsens. A votice ship from 1850 to 1851 hang in the church. It is a model of the ship of the line Christian VIII which was blown up in 1849 during the Battle of Eckernförde. It was donated in 1851 by local merchant Jens Peter Gylling and his wife Gjertrud Gylling. The church's turret clock is from the middle of the 1800s and made by A.H. Funch. Another turret clock from 1500s or 1600s was built in Eastern Jutland, and later donated to Samsø Museum after suffering severe rust. There are two bells in the church, one from 1400 to 1425 made by Nicolaus Eskilii, the other from 1654 by Jørgen Hansen.

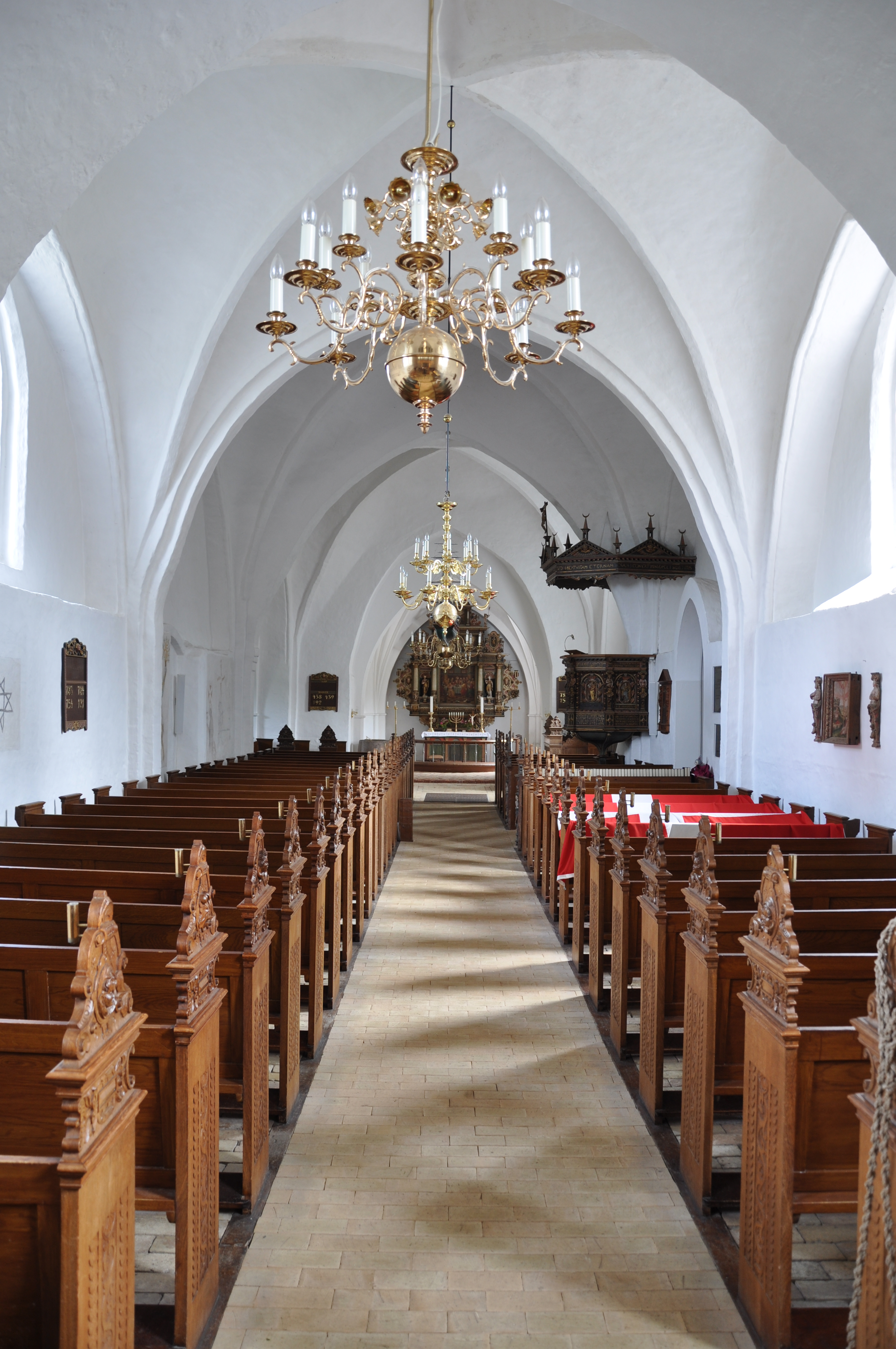
Church interior

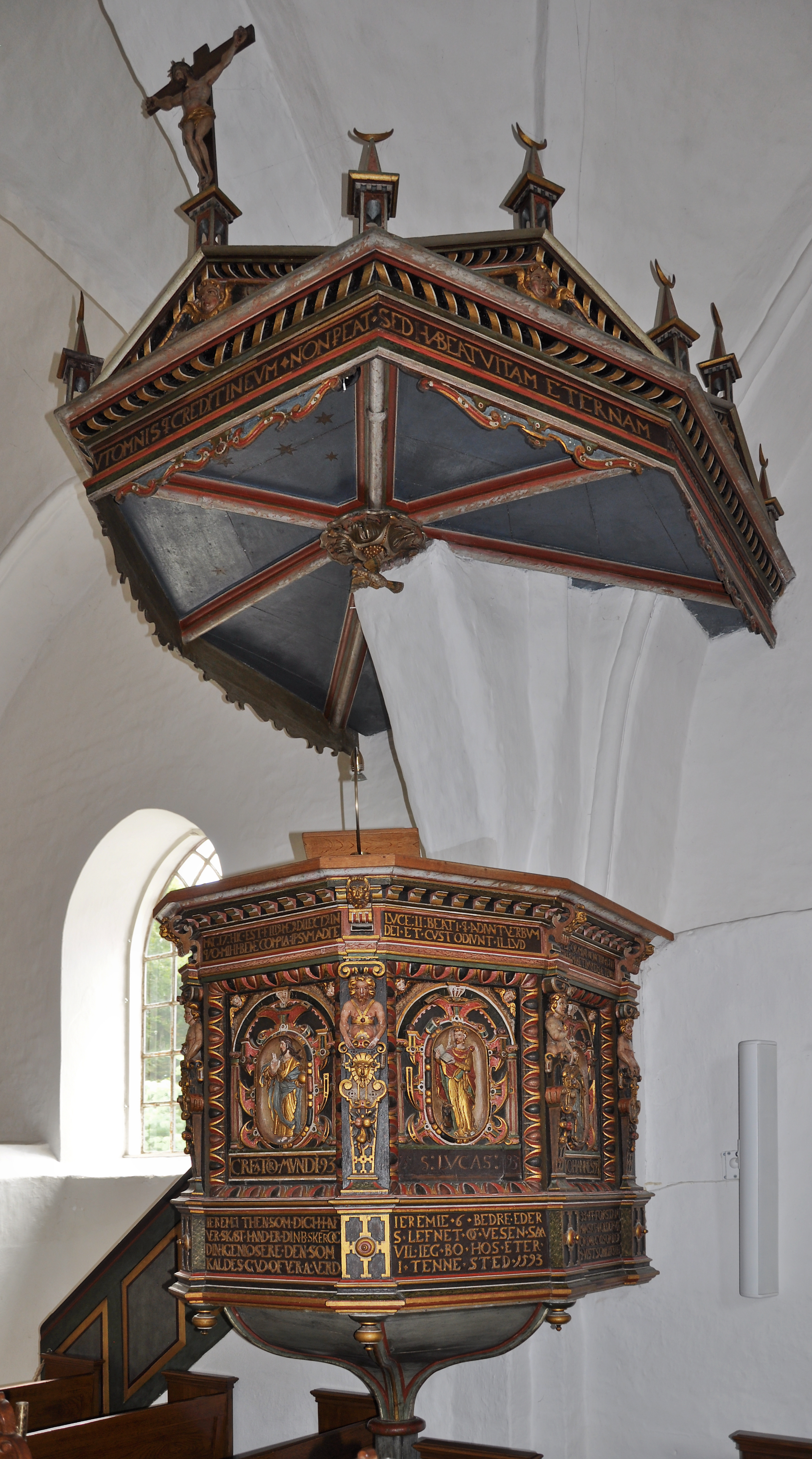
Pulpit

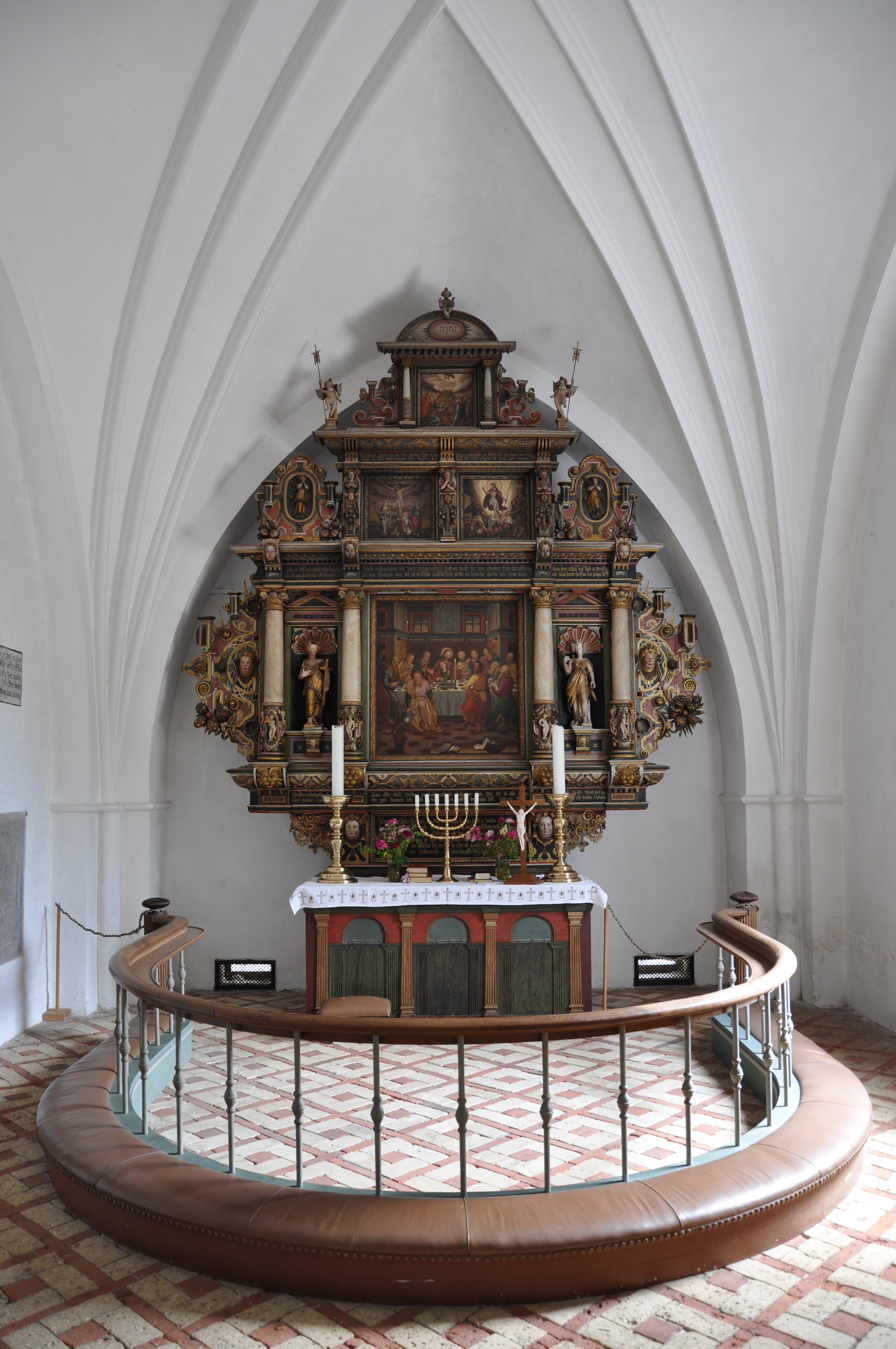
Altar

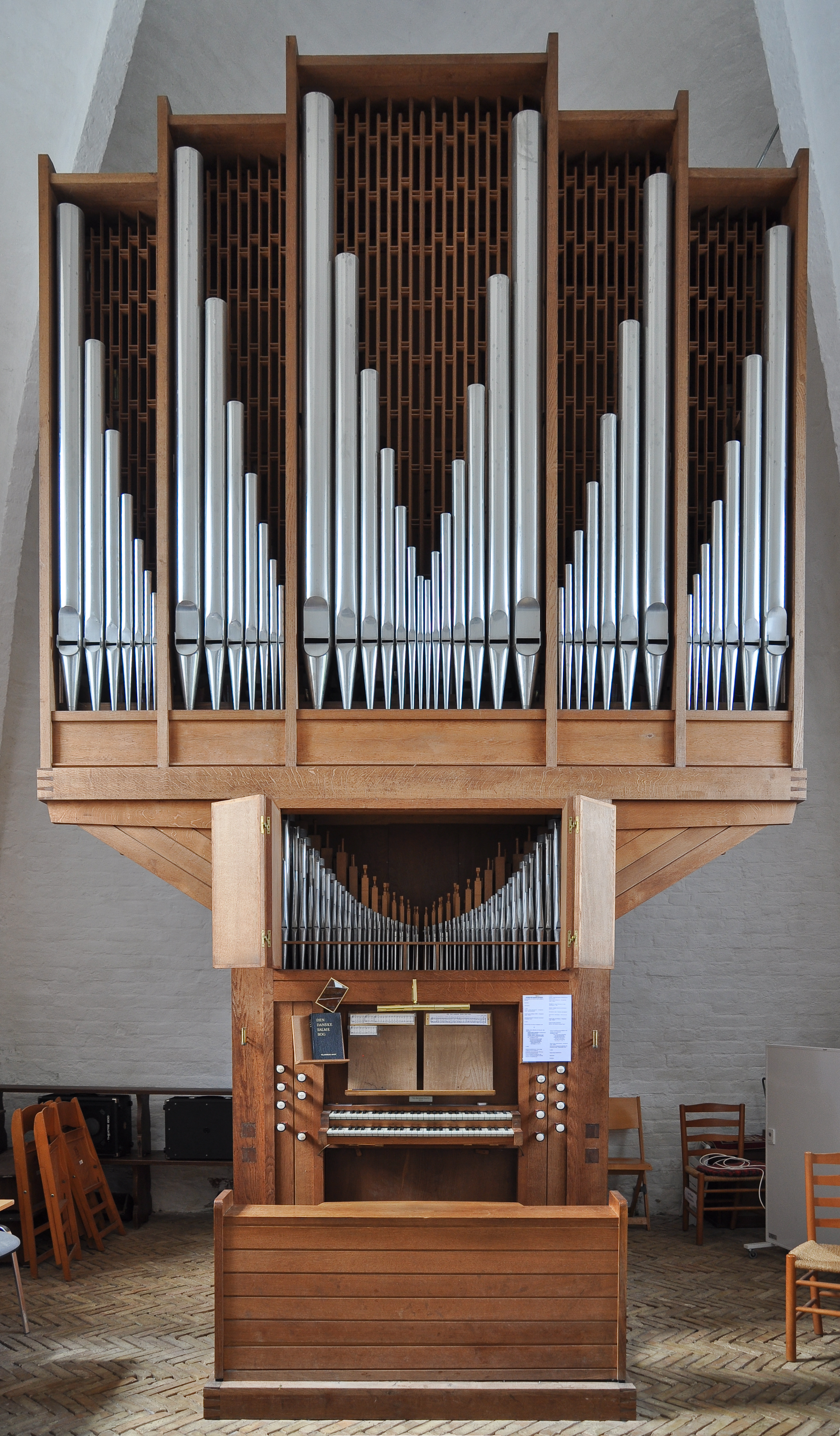
Organ

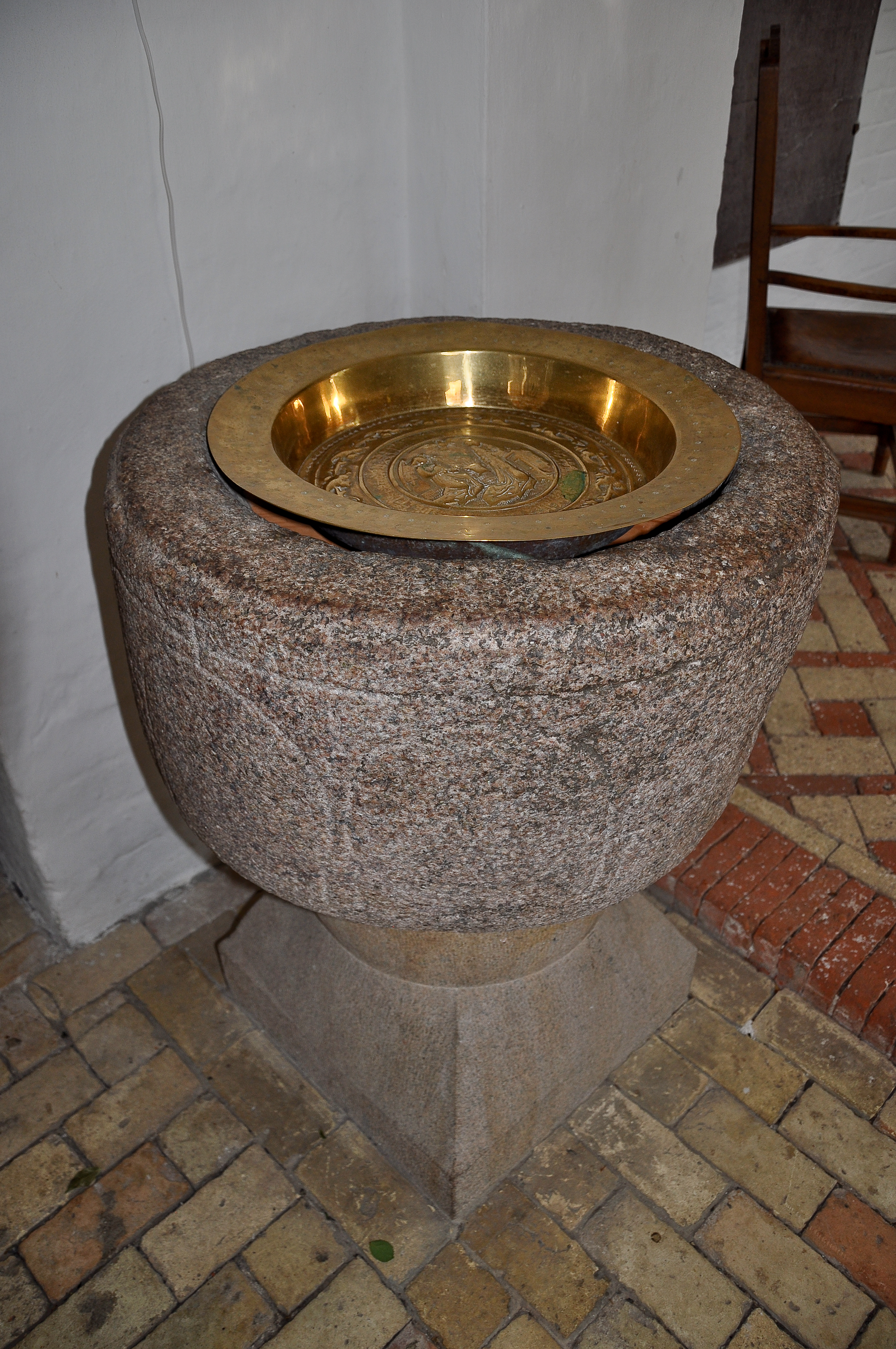
Baptismal font

=== Ørby Church ===
Ørby Church
- Ørby Kirke
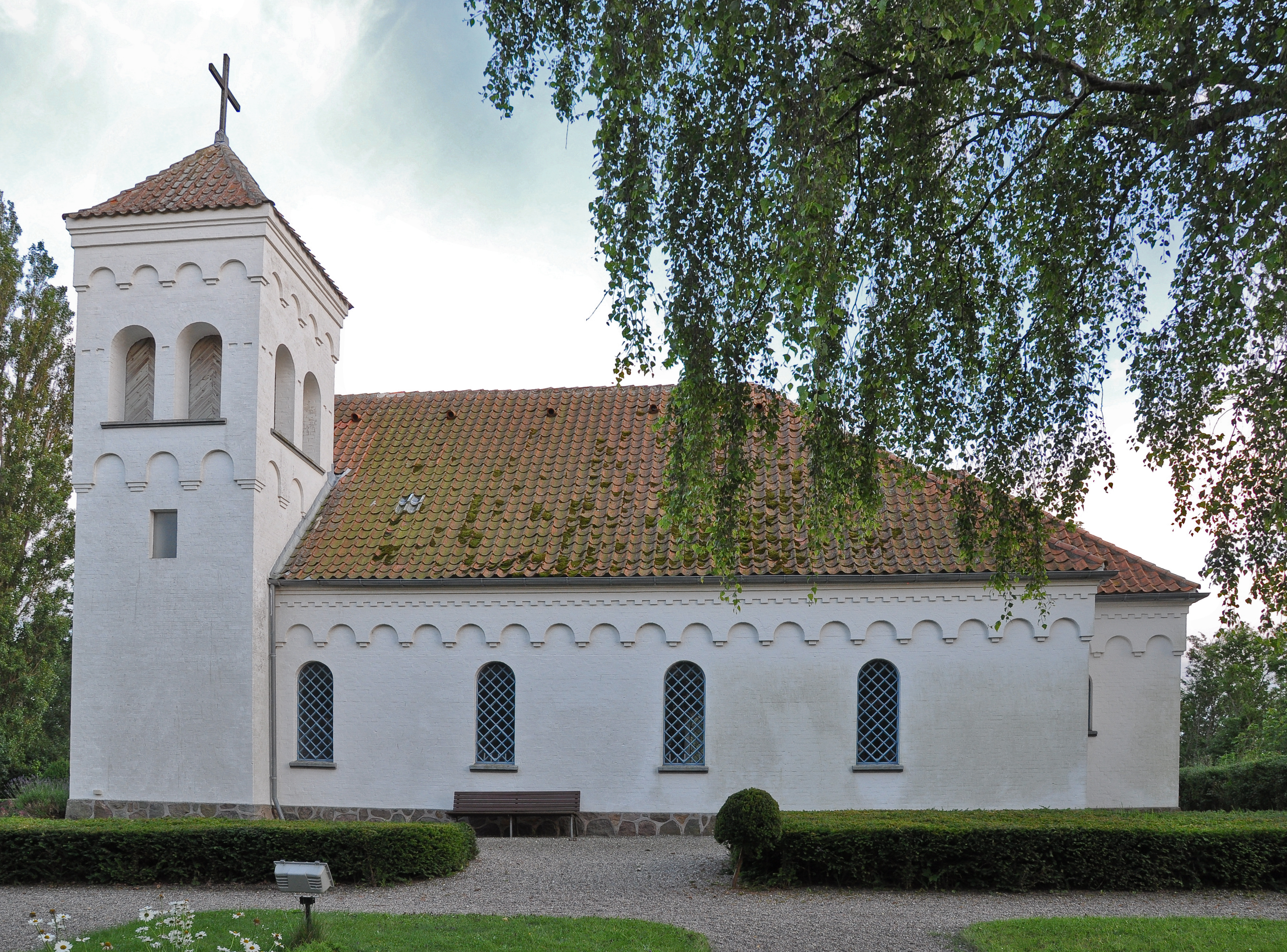
- Ørby Church
- 55°47′52.97″N 10°35′47.99″E
- Location: Denmark
- Denomination: Church of Denmark

Architecture
- Completed: 1904

Administration
- Diocese: Diocese of Aarhus
- Deanery: Aarhus Provsti
- Parish: Samsø Parish

Ørby Church is located in Ørby. It is one of seven national churches in Samsø Parish. The church has a churchyard with a cemetery.

Ørby Church was built in 1904.

The church bell was made in Aalborg in 1904.
