= Listed buildings in Samsø Municipality =

This is a list of listed buildings in Samsø Municipality, Denmark.

== Listed buildings ==
Listing name	Image	Location	Coordinates	Description
Ballen Chalk House; Ballen Kalkværk		Slagterivej 5, 8305 Samsø	55°48′52.23″N 10°38′17.07″E	Protected 1997.
Besser Hovedgade 47		Besser Hovedgade 47, 8305 Samsø	55°51′52.52″N 10°38′43.24″E	Protected 1964.
Besser Rectory; Besser Præstegård		Besser Hovedgade 1, 8305 Samsø	55°51′42.46″N 10°38′12.19″E	Farmhouse. From 1753. Protected 1950.
Besser Rectory; Besser Præstegård		Besser Hovedgade 1, 8305 Samsø	55°51′42.46″N 10°38′12.19″E	Western building. From 1700.
Besser Rectory; Besser Præstegård		Besser Hovedgade 1, 8305 Samsø	55°51′42.46″N 10°38′12.19″E	Eastern building. From 1700.
Beyergården		Maarup Hovedgade 22, 8305 Samsø	55°56′45.01″N 10°34′0.55″E	Farmhouse. From 1766. Protected 1991.
Beyergården		Maarup Hovedgade 22, 8305 Samsø	55°56′45.01″N 10°34′0.55″E	Workshop. From 1766.
Beyergården		Maarup Hovedgade 22, 8305 Samsø	55°56′45.01″N 10°34′0.55″E	Barn. From 1766.
Beyergården		Maarup Hovedgade 22, 8305 Samsø	55°56′45.01″N 10°34′0.55″E	Barn and granary. From 1766.
Brundby Post Mill; Brundby Stubmølle		Brundbyvej 23A, 8305 Samsø	55°49′10.27″N 10°36′22.44″E	Formerly known as Kolhøj Stubmølle. From 1650. Protected 1964.
Dyrlægegården		Besser Hovedgade 4, 8305 Samsø	55°51′42.46″N 10°38′17.73″E	Protected 1987.
Egevej 27		Egevej 27, 8305 Samsø	55°51′34.15″N 10°35′59.53″E	Farmhouse. From 1854. Protected 1984.
Hjortgyde 2		Hjortgyde 2, 8305 Samsø	55°57′51.71″N 10°33′9.52″E	Protected 1964.
Hæderlighedsgyden 15		Hæderlighedsgyden 15, 8305 Samsø	55°57′58.3″N 10°33′15.27″E	Protected 1988.
Kirkevej 10		Kirkevej 10, 8305 Samsø	55°50′58.9″N 10°34′9.35″E	Protected 1987.
Klokkestræde 2		Klokkestræde 2, 8305 Samsø	55°57′54.23″N 10°33′6.85″E	Protected 1964.
Kolby Windmill; Kolby Mølle		Kaasenvejen 16, 8305 Samsø	55°48′2.76″N 10°32′33.78″E	From 1859. Protected 1964.
Little Jens' House; Lille Jens' Hus		M.B. Jensensvej 1, 8305 Samsø	55°57′57.46″N 10°33′7.23″E	Protected 1964.
Lisegyden 3		Lisegyden 3, 8305 Samsø	55°57′52.89″N 10°33′9.1″E	Protected 1988.
Lygten 3		Lygten 3, 8305 Samsø	55°57′57.99″N 10°33′7.31″E	Protected 1965.
Maren Findsgyde 8		Maren Findsgyde 8, 8305 Samsø	55°57′57.03″N 10°33′4.15″E	Protected 1988.
The Maypole; Majstangen		Nordby Hovedgade 27, 8305 Samsø	55°57′55.55″N 10°33′6.04″E	Protected 1971.
Morten Madsensvej 20		Morten Madsensvej 20, 8305 Samsø	55°57′53.39″N 10°33′18.22″E	From ca. 1793. Protected 1987.
Morten Madsensvej 22		Morten Madsensvej 22, 8305 Samsø	55°57′53.56″N 10°33′19.55″E	From ca. 1793. Protected 1987.
Morten Madsensvej 26		Morten Madsensvej 26, 8305 Samsø	55°57′53.87″N 10°33′15.58″E	Protected 1987.
Maarup Hovedgade 15		Maarup Hovedgade 15, 8305 Samsø	55°56′41.76″N 10°34′2.35″E	Farmhouse. From 1727. Protected 1973.
Maarup Hovedgade 15		Maarup Hovedgade 15, 8305 Samsø	55°56′41.76″N 10°34′2.35″E	North and west wings. From 1727.
Nordby Bell Tower; Klokketårnet		Nordby Hovedgade 36, 8305 Samsø	55°57′54.66″N 10°33′6.27″E	From 1857. Protected 1971.
Per Poulsensvej 8A		Per Poulsensvej 8A, 8305 Samsø	55°57′52.35″N 10°33′10.4″E	Protected 1964.
Pillemark		Storegade 49, 8305 Samsø	55°49′23.94″N 10°33′31.69″E	Protected 1964.
Torup 18A		Torup 18A, 8305 Samsø	55°50′48.8″N 10°37′0.32″E	Protected 1987.
Tranebjerg Church Barn; Tranebjerg Kirkelade		Tingvej 2, 8305 Samsø	55°50′3.89″N 10°35′11.48″E	Protected 1964.
Ved Kæret 6		Ved Kæret 6, 8305 Samsø	55°57′55.68″N 10°33′11.76″E	From 1849. Protected 1964.
Ved Kæret 8		Ved Kæret 8, 8305 Samsø	55°57′55.55″N 10°33′11.08″E	From 1860. Protected 1964.
Ved Kæret 12		Ved Kæret 12, 8305 Samsø	55°57′55.48″N 10°33′9.41″E	From 1840. Protected 1964.
Ved Kæret 14		Ved Kæret 14, 8305 Samsø	55°57′55.15″N 10°33′8.15″E	From ca. 1834. Protected 1964.
Vestergyde 3		Vestergyde 3, 8305 Samsø	55°57′47.76″N 10°33′6.93″E	Farmhouse. From 1870. Protected 1998.
Vestergyde 3		Vestergyde 3, 8305 Samsø	55°57′47.76″N 10°33′6.93″E	From 1700.
Vestergyde 3		Vestergyde 3, 8305 Samsø	55°57′47.76″N 10°33′6.93″E	Barn. From 1700.
Vestergyde 3		Vestergyde 3, 8305 Samsø	55°57′47.76″N 10°33′6.93″E	Barn. From 1700.
Ørbygård		Ørby Hovedgade 19, 8305 Samsø	55°47′45.05″N 10°35′50.72″E	Farmhouse. From 1777. Protected 1984.
Ørbygård		Ørby Hovedgade 19, 8305 Samsø	55°47′45.05″N 10°35′50.72″E	Barn and gate. From 1777.
Ørbygård		Ørby Hovedgade 19, 8305 Samsø	55°47′45.05″N 10°35′50.72″E	Barn From 1777.
Ørbygård		Ørby Hovedgade 19, 8305 Samsø	55°47′45.05″N 10°35′50.72″E	Shed. From 1777.
Ørbygård		Ørby Hovedgade 19, 8305 Samsø	55°47′45.05″N 10°35′50.72″E	Barn. From 1777.
