= Marcel Meijer =

Dutch-Danish politician

Mayor of Samsø Municipality
- Incumbent
- Assumed office 1 January 2014
- Preceded by: Jørn Nissen (C)

Personal details
- Born: 26 August 1966 (age 59) Nieuwe Pekela, Netherlands
- Party: Social Democrats

Marcel Meijer (born 26 August 1966) is a Dutch-Danish politician. He is a member of the Social Democrats, and has been the mayor of Samsø Municipality since 2014. He moved to Denmark in 1992. After the 2013 Danish local elections he became the first Social Democratic mayor of Samsø Municipality, as well as the only mayor to not be a Danish citizen. He became a Danish citizen on February 25, 2020.
