= Jørn Nissen =

Danish politician (born 1949)

Mayor of Samsø Municipality
- In office 1 January 2010 – 31 December 2013
- Preceded by: Carsten Bruun (V)
- Succeeded by: Marcel Meijer (A)

Personal details
- Born: 27 February 1949 (age 77)
- Party: Conservative People's Party

Jørn C. Nissen (born 27 February 1949) is a Danish politician. He is a member of the Conservative People's Party, and was the mayor of Samsø Municipality from 2010 to 2013. He has been sitting in Samsø Municipality's municipal council since 1998.
