= Nordby, Samsø =

Nordby
- Village
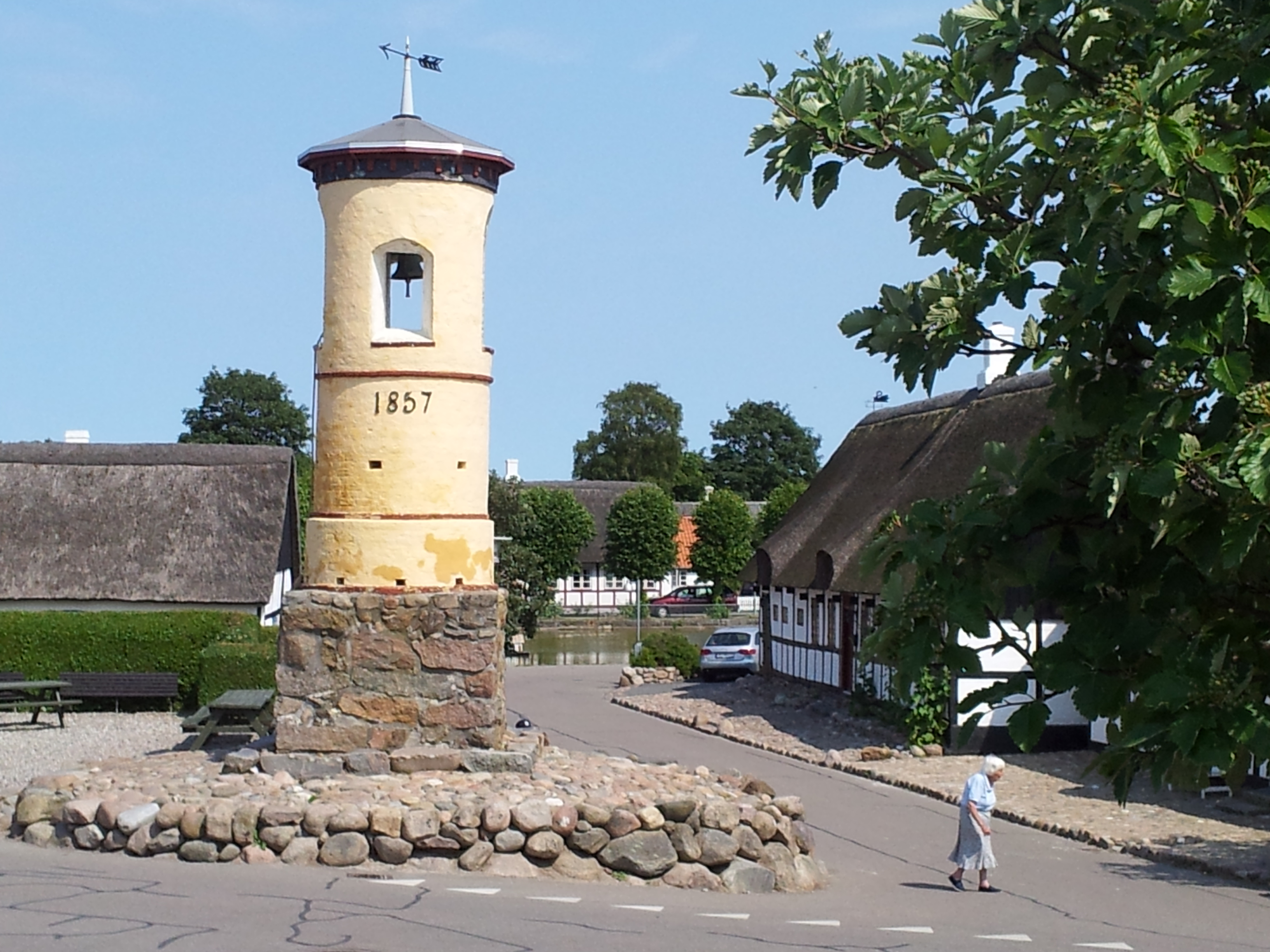
- Bell tower in Nordby

- Location in the Central Denmark Region
- Coordinates: 55°57′51″N 10°33′9″E
- Country: Denmark
- Region: Central Denmark
- Municipality: Samsø

Population (2026)
  - Total: 204
- Time zone: UTC+1 (CET)
  - Summer (DST): UTC+2 (CEST)
- Website: Nordbysamso.dk

Nordby is a village on the island of Samsø in Denmark. It is located in Samsø Municipality.

== Nordby Bell Tower ==
Nordby Church was built in the 1200s, but not in or near Nordby. Instead it was built centrally between the four villages of Samsø's north island: Nordby, Mårup, Søby and Glistrup. Søby and Glistrup no longer exist. The church's distance from Nordby meant that the villagers were unable to hear the church bell, so a bell tower was built in the 1600s in the center of Nordby, on a small plaza known locally as Galgepladsen. This plaza is also where the village's pillory was located until 1820. The current version of the village's bell tower was built in 1857. Other than church events, the bell tower also rang to warn against fires or when an animal was butchered and its meat sold on the plaza. Until 2011 the gravedigger of Nordby Church rang the bell. Today an organisation of volunteers, known as Ringelauget, ring the bell.
