= Brundby =

- Village
- Location in the Central Denmark Region
- Coordinates: 55°48′54″N 10°36′12″E
- Country: Denmark
- Region: Central Denmark
- Municipality: Samsø

Population (2020)
  - Total: 200
- Time zone: UTC+1 (CET)
  - Summer (DST): UTC+2 (CEST)

Brundby is a village on the island of Samsø in Denmark. It is located in Samsø Municipality.

== Brundby Post Mill ==
Brundby Post Mill (Danish: Brundby Stubmølle) is a post mill located north of Brundby. In the 1600s the mill was located on Endelave, but was sold to Samsø in 1683 and set up on the hill of Dansebjerg south of Brundby. It was moved in 1817 to its current location. It was in use until 1939. It is one of 16 remaining post mills in Denmark.
