= Carsten Bruun (mayor) =

Danish politician

Mayor of Samsø Municipality
- In office 1 January 2002 – 31 December 2009
- Preceded by: John Sander Petersen (V)
- Succeeded by: Jørn Nissen (C)

Personal details
- Born: 24 November 1953 (age 72) Holte, Denmark
- Party: Venstre

Carsten Bruun (born 24 November 1953) is a Danish politician. He is a member of the Venstre party, and was the mayor of Samsø Municipality between 2002 and 2009. He moved to Samsø in 1981. He has been sitting in Samsø Municipality's municipal council since 2002.
