= Onsbjerg =

- Village
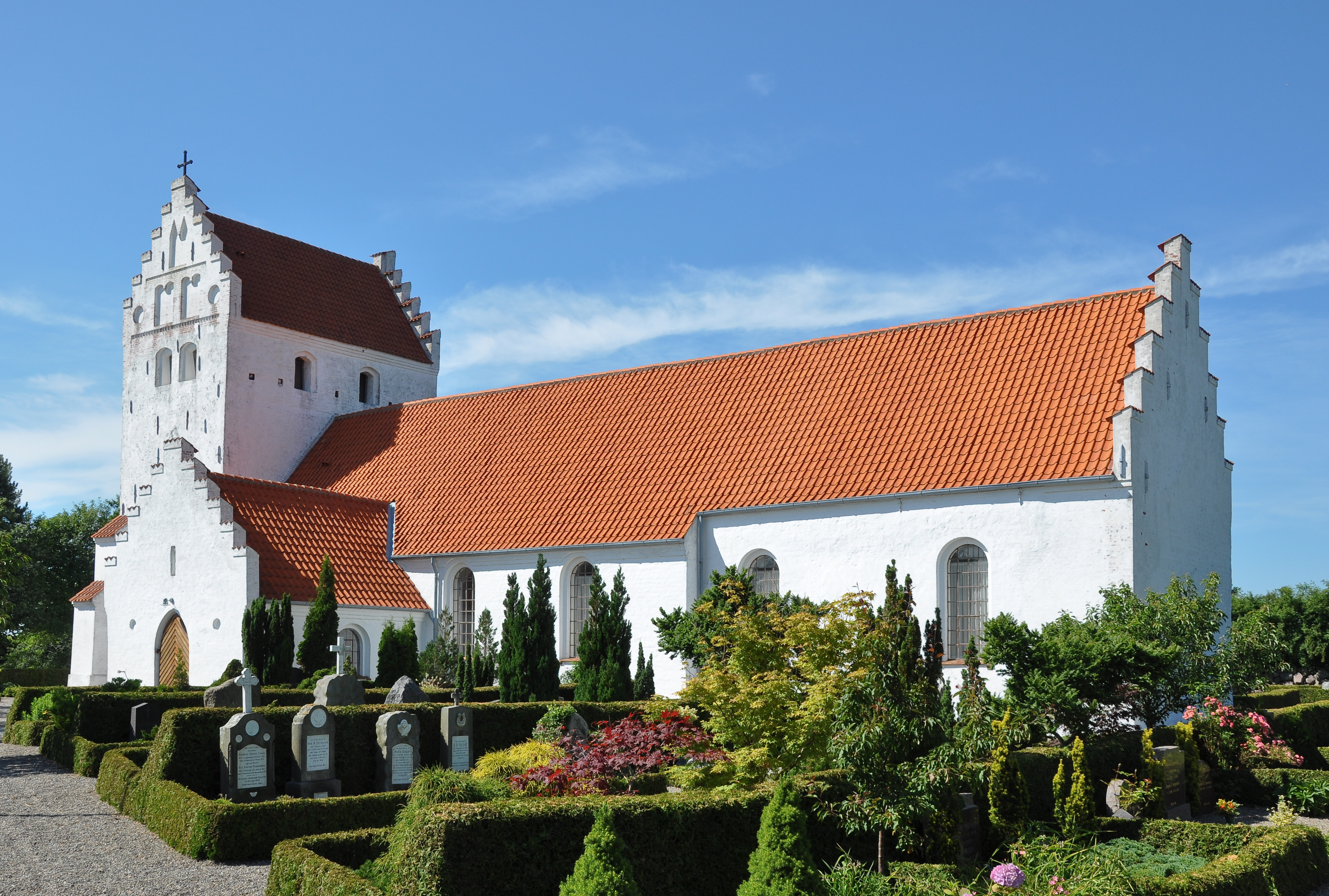
- Onsbjerg Church

- Location in the Central Denmark Region
- Coordinates: 55°51′0″N 10°34′42″E
- Country: Denmark
- Region: Central Denmark
- Municipality: Samsø

Population (2026)
  - Total: 224
- Time zone: UTC+1 (CET)
  - Summer (DST): UTC+2 (CEST)

Onsbjerg is a village on the island of Samsø in Denmark. It is located in Samsø Municipality

== Etymology ==
The village is named after the nearby hill of Dyret, which was formerly named Odinsbjerg.

== History ==
Onsbjerg Church (also known as Holy Cross Church. Danish: Hellig Kors Kirke) was built in the 1200s.
