= Samsø Municipality =

Samsø Municipality Samsø Kommune (Danish)
- Municipality
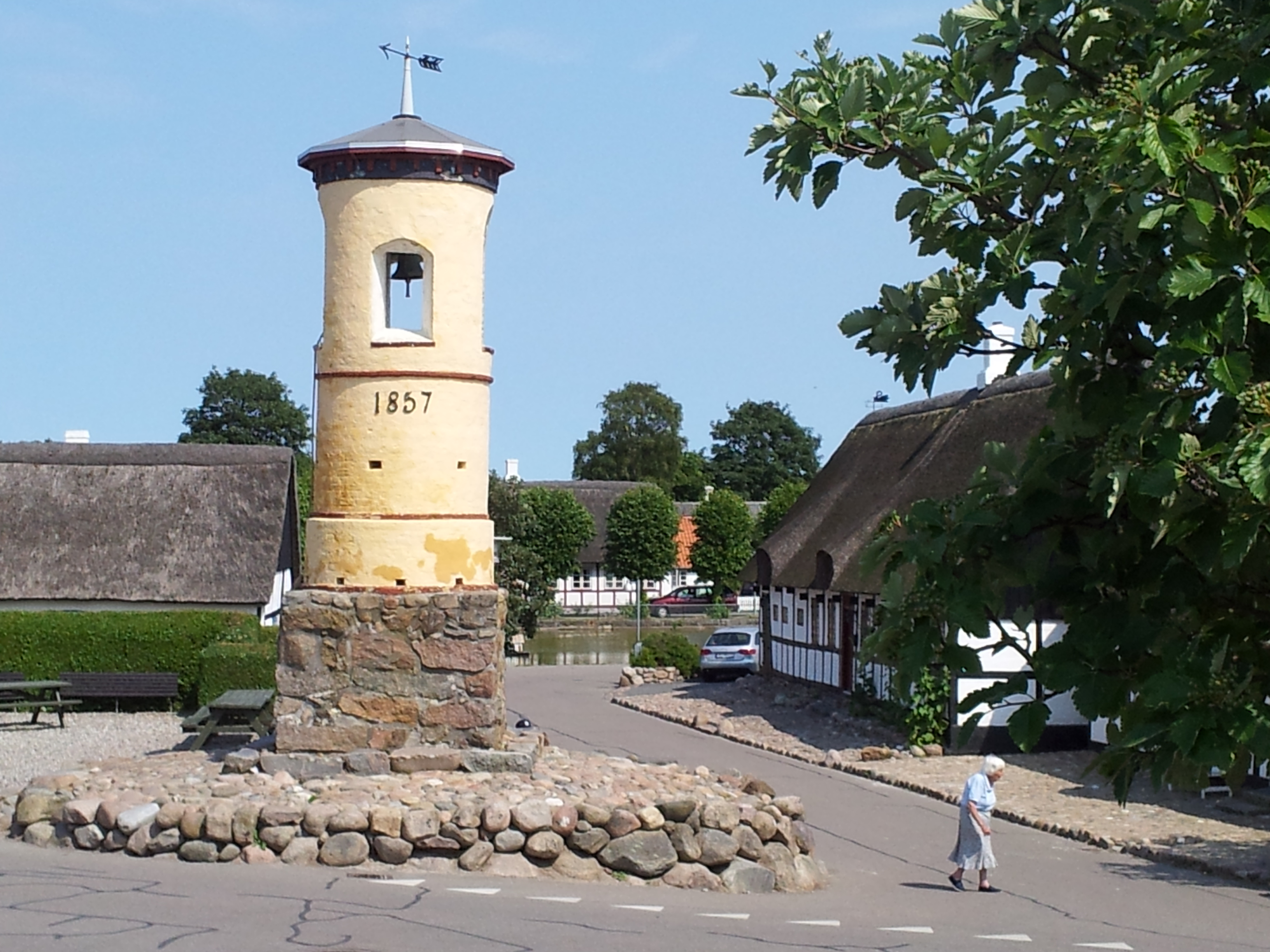
- Nordby bell tower

- Coat of arms

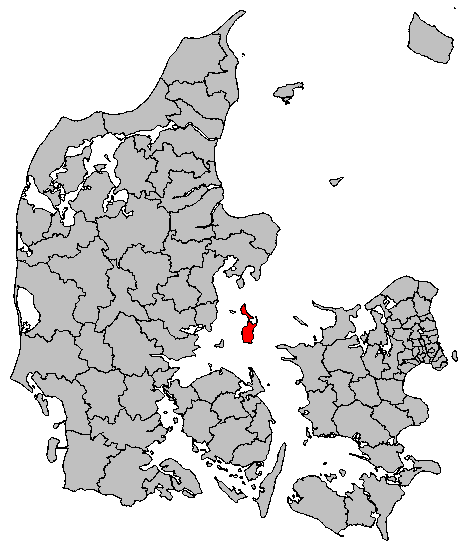
- Coordinates: 55°52′N 10°37′E
- Country: Denmark
- Region: Central Denmark
- Established: April 1, 1970
- Seat: Tranebjerg

Government
  - Mayor: Marcel Meijer (A)

Area
  - Total: 115 km^{2} (44 sq mi)

Population (1 January 2026)
  - Total: 3,617
  - Density: 31.5/km^{2} (81.5/sq mi)
- Time zone: UTC1 (CET)
  - Summer (DST): UTC2 (CEST)
- Postal code: 8305
- Municipal code: 741
- Website: www.samsoe.dk

Samsø Municipality (Danish: Samsø Kommune) is a municipality (Danish: kommune) in Region of Central Denmark. Samsø municipality covers an area of 115 km^{2} in the Kattegat sea, between the Danish mainland of Jutland and Zealand and comprises the island of Samsø as well as a number of small surrounding islands. The mayor has since 2014 been Marcel Meijer, a member of the Social Democrats (Danish: Socialdemokraterne) political party. The seat of the municipal council is the town of Tranebjerg.

Ferry services connect the town of Sælvig to the town of Hov in Odder Municipality as well as Aarhus, and the town of Ballen connects to the city of Kalundborg on Zealand. To the east is the strait of Samsø Bælt, separating Samsø from Zealand.

Samsø Municipality was not merged with any adjacent municipality under the municipal reform of 2007, as it agreed to enter into a "municipal cooperation agreement" with Aarhus Municipality and limited cooperation with Odder Municipality.

The municipality is part of Business Region Aarhus and of the East Jutland metropolitan area, which had a total population of 1.378 million in 2016.

== History ==
Samsø was a historically important location in the Viking Age, due to its central location in Kattegat. The Kanhave canal was constructed in the 720s to allow for easy and quick access across the sea. Five castles were built on the island in the Middle Ages, where the island was under ownership of the king. The island was in 1676 gifted to Sophie Amalie Moth, who became countess of the island.

Denmark has historically been divided into syssels in the Middle Ages. Samsø was a hundred in Åbosyssel. With the dissolving of the syssels, Samsø came under Kalundborg Fief. The fief was later changed to a county, and Samsø was between 1660 and 1670 part of Kalundborg County. Kalundborg County was merged into Holbæk County in 1793.

Samsø never had any market towns (Danish: Købstader), but was granted special privileges as islanders. Among those privileges were the permission to ship out their own products, which was usually reserved for market towns. The naval importance of Samsø became significant through the 1600s, but the Great Northern War in 1709-1720 halved the ships on the island. Several fortifications and scones were constructed on Samsø and the surrounding islands, which increased its military importance. The English Wars resulted in another halving of Samsø's ship, and another big hit to the island's economy and maritime significance.

In 1962 there were five parish municipalities in Samsø Hundred: Besser, Kolby, Nordby, Onsbjerg and Tranebjerg. They were, in 1962, merged to form Samsø Municipality. In 1970 Samsø Municipality was moved from Holbæk County to Århus County. In the municipal reform of 2007 Samsø was not merged with any other municipality.

=== Historical divisions ===
The table below shows the historical municipal subdivisions of Samsø Municipality.

Historical municipal divisions of Samsø Municipality
1970	1962	1868	1842	Towns
Samsø Mun.	Samsø Parish Mun.	Tranebjerg Parish Mun.		Tranebjerg
Samsø Mun.	Samsø Parish Mun.	Tranebjerg Parish Mun.		Brundby
Samsø Mun.	Samsø Parish Mun.	Kolby Parish Mun.		Kolby
Samsø Mun.	Samsø Parish Mun.	Nordby Parish Mun.		Nordby
Samsø Mun.	Samsø Parish Mun.	Onsbjerg Parish Mun.	Onsbjerg-Besser Parish Mun.	Onsbjerg
Samsø Mun.	Samsø Parish Mun.	Besser Parish Mun.	Onsbjerg-Besser Parish Mun.	Besser

== Towns ==
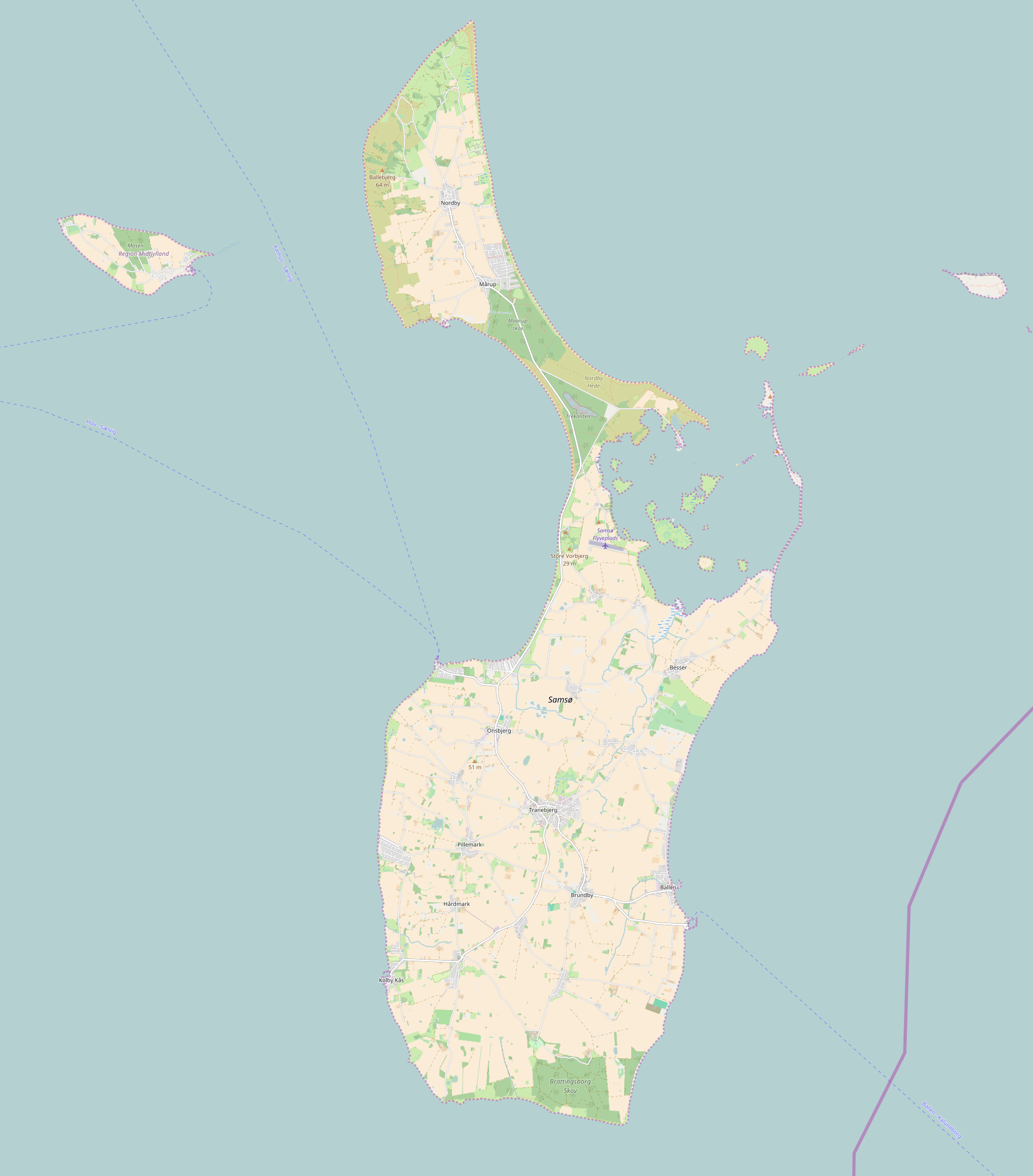
Map of Samsø.

Below are all settlements in the municipality with populations of at least 200 people (populations as of 2020).

Tranebjerg	814
Onsbjerg	229
Nordby	213
Brundby	200

=== Tranebjerg ===
Tranebjerg is located centrally on the southern part of the island. Tranebjerg Bog and the river Sørenden borders the town to the north. The south-eastern neighborhood of the town is called Frederiksberg. The rest of the town is surrounded by fields.

Tranebjerg is the administrative center of the municipality, and home to the municipality's town hall. Tranebjerg Church and Samsø Museum. South of the church is Samsø Library and the municipality's town hall. In the center of the town, slightly south of the town hall, is Samsø Hospital. Also in the center of the town is a football field known as Tranebjerg Stadion, used by the local football teams. Along the road of Langgade, where the football field is also located, are several shops, restaurants and cafés. A pharmacy and tourist center is located in this area. Frederiksberg, the southern part of the town, as well as the eastern part of the town are mainly residential areas. There is a small industrial area in the north-eastern part of the town.

In 2008 ruins from a church from the 1100s was found in Tranebjerg. This indicated the presence of a castle known as Brattingsborg Castle (Danish: Gammel Brattingsborg), which was burnt down by Stig Andersen Hvide in 1289.

=== Villages ===
Nordby is the northernmost settlement on the island, and is the location of several restaurants and hotel, as well as the largest natural maze in the world, Samsø Labyrinten.

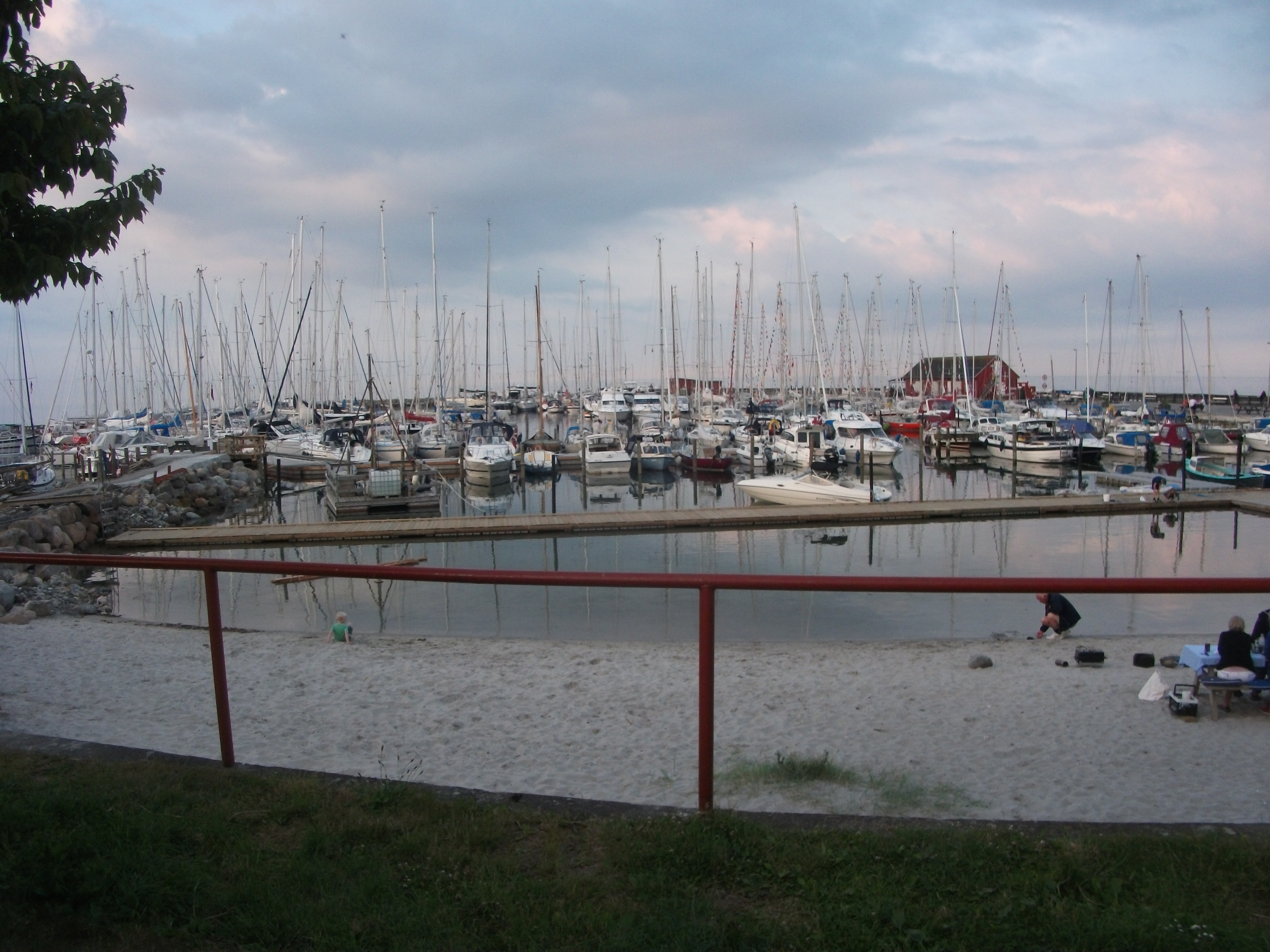
Ballen Marina.

There are marinas in Ballen, Langør and Mårup Havn, and all three marinas are popular tourist destinations. Ballen is also home to many hotels and restaurants.

Samsø Højskole was located in the village of Kolby between 1984 and 2012. The school today acts as a hotel.

The ferry harbour to Kalundborg is located in Ballen, on the south-eastern part of the island. The ferry harbour to Hov and Aarhus is located in Sælvig, also on the western side of the island, but further north.

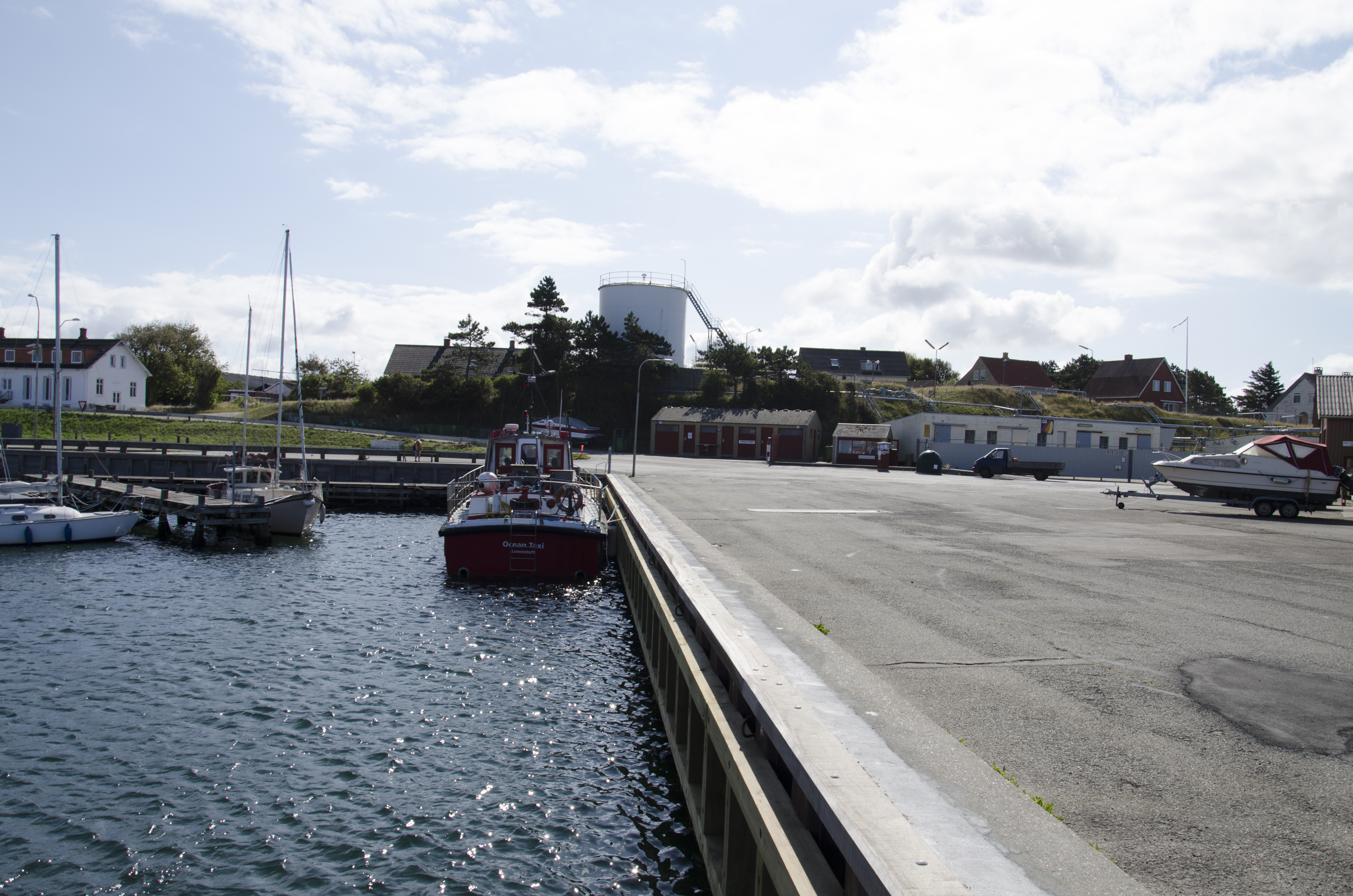
Kolby Kås ferry harbour.

Permelille is a village located south of Tranebjerg. A jam and pickled food factory - Samsø Syltefabrik - is located here. The factory building is from 1887 and is originally a dairy factory, which later became a company that sold eggs and asparagus. The asparagus was pickled, and the picked food factory was established in 1974. Falcon Center Samsø (Danish: Falkecenter Samsø) is located north of Permelille.

Stavns is a village located south of the Kanhave Canal, on the thin neck of the island. South of Stavns is the Samsø Airport (Danish: Samsø Flyveplads).

In addition to these villages, there are a number of smaller settlements in the municipality. These are all the settlements with populations of less than 200 people:

Agerup
Alstrup
Ballen
Ballen Strand
Besser
Brundbymark
Hårdmark

Hårdmark Mark
Kanhave
Kolby
Kolby Kås
Langdal Gårde
Langemark
Langør

Lille Vorbjerg
Mårup
Mårup Østerstrand
Permelille
Pillemark
Selsinggårde
Sildeballe

Stavns
Strandskoven
Sælvig
Tanderup
Toftebjerg
Torup
Torupdal

Vesterløkker
Ørby
Østerby

== Nature ==
Most of Samsø is used for agriculture, but the island is also home to several important Danish nature areas.

Sælvig Bay was protected in the 1930s. 14 acres of hills known as Rævebakkerne north of Sælvig was protected in 1989. The hills are home to the endangered astragalus danicus bean plant.

Dyret, formerly Odinsbjerg, is a hill located south of Onsbjerg. It is 51 meters tall and the highest point on the southern part of the island. The hill was protected in 1919. During the Second World War the Germans used the hill for surveillance of the surrounding waters.

Brattingsborg Castle owns a 2,030 acre forest known as Brattingsborg Forest on the southernmost part of the island. The forest is open to the public.

=== Nordby Heath ===
Nordby Heath (Danish: Nordby Hede) is a 6 km^{2} large heath, largely covered in erica. It was protected, along with Stavns Fjord, in 1981. Up to a quarter of the heath is covered in the invasive moss campylopus introflexus, which suffocates the native erica. Other invasive species threatening the heath are rosa rugosa and Pinus mugo. Cattle has been grazing on the heath since 1998.

=== Nordby Hills ===
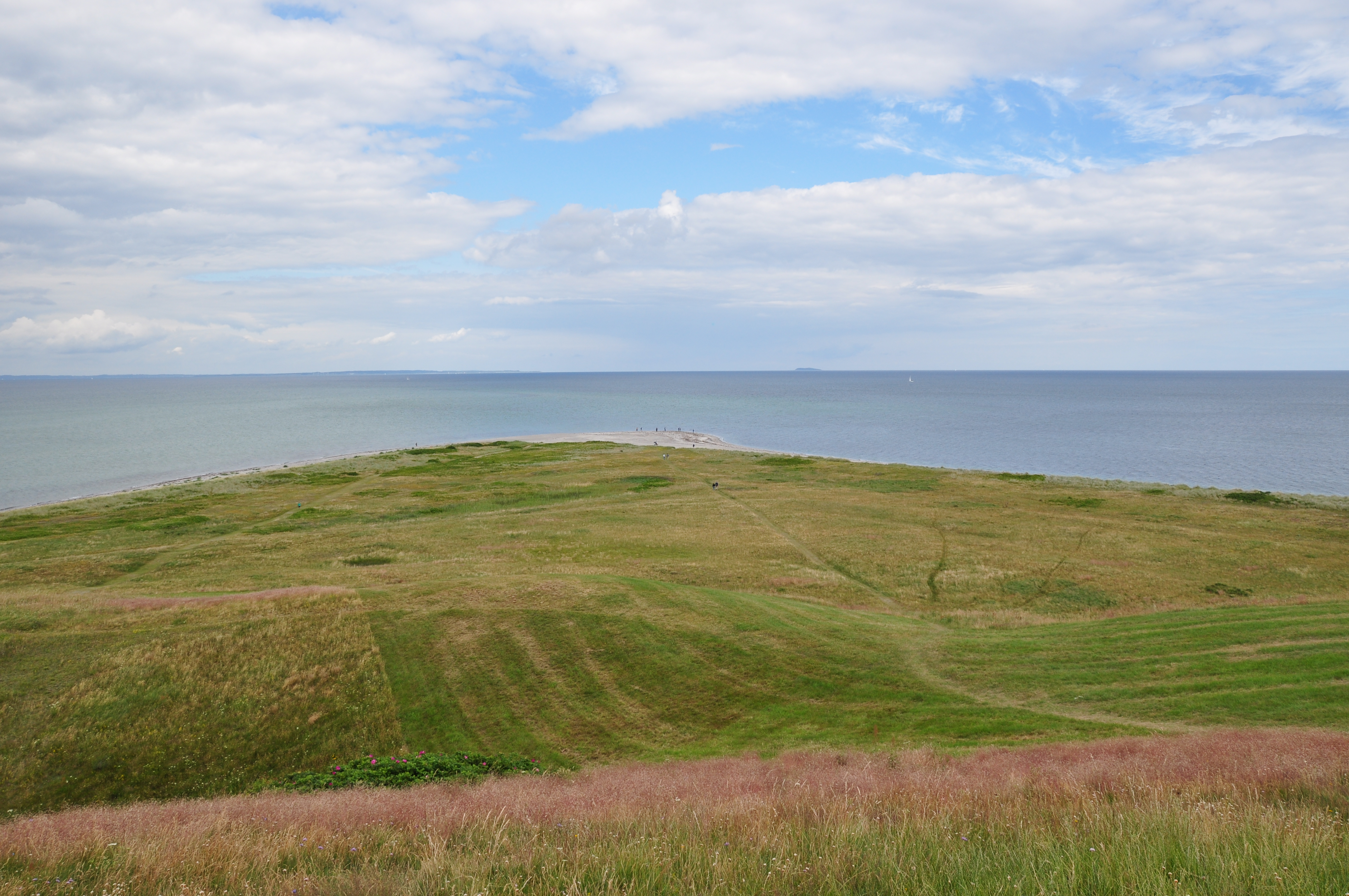
Issehoved.

Nordby Hills (Danish: Nordby Bakker) cover most of the western and northern coasts of the northern part of the island. The highest point of the municipality is Ballebjerg (64 m) and is located among these hills. A watchtower was built on top of Ballebjerg in 1920, giving a view over the coast and the hills. 480 acres in total are protected, spanning from Issehoved, the northernmost point of the island, to Ballebjerg. Four isolated parts of the hills are also protected: Staderenden, Svinekilderne, Møgelskår and Asmindør Hage. The protection of the hills was done in stages, with Møgelskår being protected first in 1936. Issehoved was protected in 1949, and further areas were protected in 1963, 1967 and 1980.

Espedal, a valley in Møgelskår, is home to unusual Danish livestock, namely gute sheep and highland cattle. The European green toad can be found in Nordby Hills, which makes it the northernmost habitat for the frog in Europe. The sand lizard thrive in the hills, though the lizard is threatened in Denmark. Rare Danish plants in the hills include anacamptis morio, potentilla neumanniana and medicago minima.

=== Stavns Fjord ===
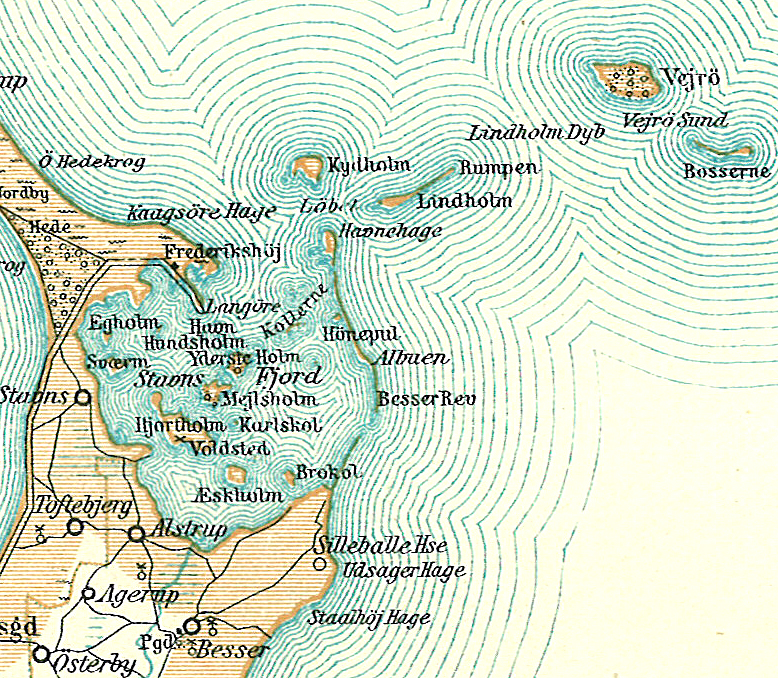
Map of Stavns Fjord from around 1900.

Stavns Fjord is a fjord at central Samsø. It covers an area of around 20 km^{2}, and is surrounded by Samsø, with an opening between Lilleøre and the 5 km long isthmus Besser Rev to the north. The fjord is shallow, with a nearly circular shape and a number of uninhabited islands. Some islands have a history with livestock or fortifications. The Kanhave Canal cuts into the fjord in the west, on the narrowest section of the island, though water does not run through the canal. The entirety of Stavns Fjord is protected, with around 1500 acres total having been protected since 1981, though the area has been a nature reserve since 1926 before that.

There is a harbour and marina in Langør to the north, and a much smaller harbour just outside Stavns. The harbours are for sports and recreational activities.

The fjord is one of the biggest breeding grounds for the common eider in Denmark. Many types of ducks, seaducks and seabirds also breed here, including one of the largest cormorant colonies in Denmark. The yellow meadow ant is common on the beaches along the fjord, where swans and waders also breed. The fjord is also home to porpoises, harbor seals and grey seals.

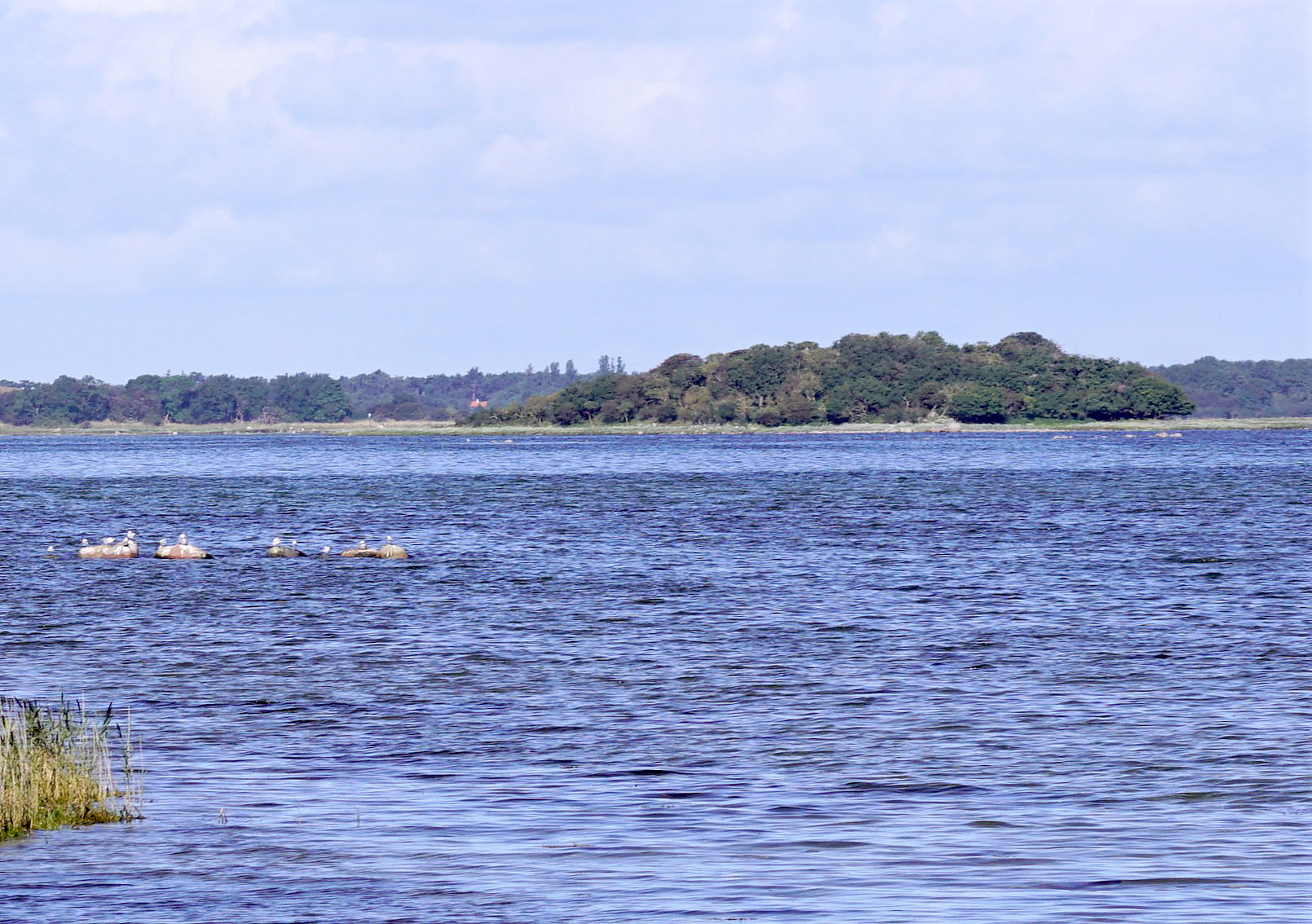
The island of Eskeholm.

The islands of Stavns Fjord are: Bosserne, Brokold, Eskeholm, Hjortholm, Hundsholm, Karlskold, Kolderne, Kyholm, Lindholm, Mejlesholm, Sværm, Vejrø, Yderste Holm, Ægholm and Ørhage. The strait between Yderste Holm and Kolderne is known as Rensegab.

==== Hjortholm ====
Hjortholm is the largest island in Stavns Fjord itself, spanning 51 acres. The island's name translates to 'island with deer' and dates back from the 1200s. There are two hills on the island, with the southern hill having been the planned site for a fortification in the Middle Ages. The construction of the fortification was started but never finished. The ruins of a building from the renaissance is located on the island, and this was likely the home of the island's caretaker. The island was around that time used for breeding horses. Hjortholm is owned by Brattingsborg Manor.

==== Vejrø ====
Vejrø is located 7 km north-east of Samsø, and is the largest of the four island laying outside Stavns Fjord itself, but still being considered part of the fjord. It spans 55 acres. It is home to mouflon sheep and rabbits. The island is owned by Brattingsborg Manor.

==== Kyholm ====
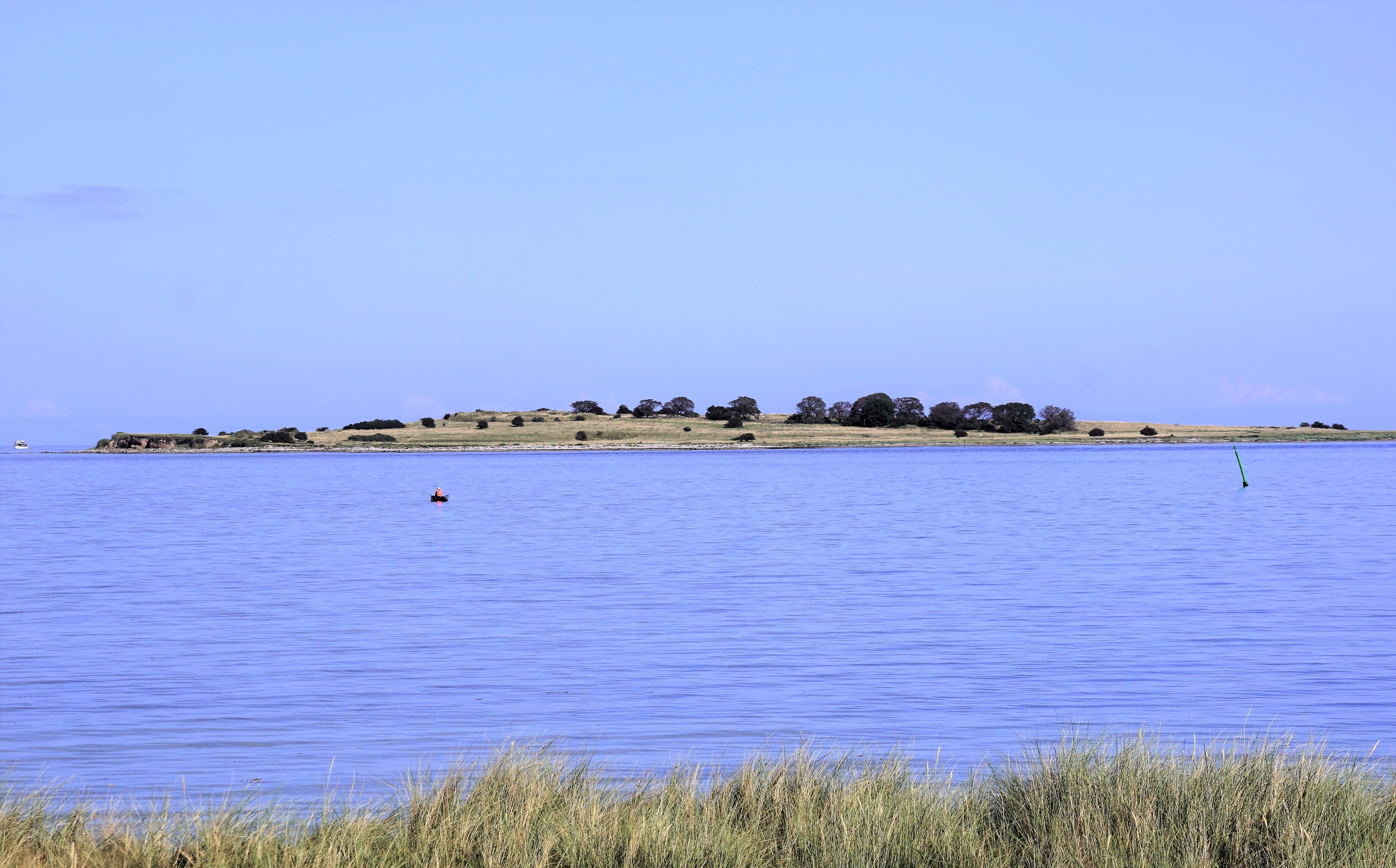
The island of Kyholm.

Kyholm is located just outside of Stavns Fjord itself, north of Besser Rev. It spans 30 acres. The name translates to 'cow island', and has historically been used for cattle grazing. Between 1709 and 1711 Kyholm was a quarantine station during the plague epidemic. A plague house was constructed, and merchant ships had to dock at Kyholm in 40 days to prevent infection with the islanders. During the English Wars between 1801 and 1815, a series of sconces were built and a garrison set up on the island. A quarantine station was established again between 1831 and 1859, this time to prevent cholera. A hospital and a cemetery was built. Ships wanting to go to Danish harbours had to visit Kyholm first. This stopped in 1857 and in 1859 the quarantine station was shut down and the buildings torn down. The cemetery remains on the island, and many tomb stones are still visible. The island is today under the same protection as the other islands in and around Stavns Fjord. Brattingsborg Manor owns the island.

== Politics ==
Samsø Municipality was not merged with any adjacent municipality under the 2007 Danish Municipal Reform, instead requiring a special cooperation agreement with Aarhus and Odder Municipality.

On the table below is an overview of all elections held in Denmark since the 2007 Municipal Reform. The percentages in the table are the local results from Samsø Municipality. The party with the most votes received is shaded in their respective color. Venstre has historically been the largest party in the municipality, but has only managed to become the largest party once since 2013. This was in the 2019 European Parliament election, where Morten Løkkegaard was Venstre's lead candidate. In all other elections since 2015, the Social Democrats have been the largest party in the municipality. The Conservative People's Party was the largest party in the regional elections in 2009 and 2013, where Conservative candidate Per Urban Olsen ran. Olsen was a local candidate from Sælvig, and received the most votes of any candidate in Samsø Municipality, receiving 1,306 of the 1,353 votes cast for Conservative candidates in 2009 election. In the 2014 European Parliament election the largest party in the municipality became the Danish People's Party. This was the case in most of the country, and the first time in Denmark's history that the party had been the largest party in a nationwide election. In the 2021 regional elections, the largest party in the municipality was the Social People's Party. A third of the voters in the municipality voted for the Socialist People's Party's candidate Ulla Holm. Holm was a local candidate from Samsø, and received 881 of the 937 votes cast for her party in the municipality.

Election	Percentage													Turnout
Election	A	B	C	D	F	I	K	N	O	V	Ø	Å	...	Turnout
2007 Folketing	25.0	4.8	8.3	—	14.5	2.7	0.5	—	12.1	29.2	2.9	—	0.0	85.4%
2009 EP	16.6	3.1	12.8	—	21.0	0.7	—	9.4	11.4	21.9	—	—	3.3	59.7%
2009 Local	13.0	—	19.7	—	17.0	—	—	—	—	32.9	—	—	17.5	79.1%
2009 Region	16.5	3.0	55.5	—	11.4	—	0.1	—	2.6	6.7	3.3	—	0.9	78.8%
2011 Folketing	23.0	7.6	5.3	—	14.0	3.0	0.2	—	10.0	27.9	9.0	—	0.0	87.4%
2013 Local	19.6	—	14.8	—	12.1	1.1	—	—	4.8	34.0	—	—	13.5	82.3%
2013 Region	22.6	1.9	46.7	—	3.3	0.6	0.2	—	3.8	10.6	9.4	—	0.7	82.0%
2014 EP	15.6	4.6	9.8	—	13.1	2.3	—	11.0	25.9	17.7	—	—	—	56.6%
2015 Folketing	28.0	2.3	4.4	—	4.6	5.1	0.3	—	18.0	21.5	8.2	7.5	0.0	85.1%
2017 Local	41.3	—	14.7	—	9.5	—	—	—	2.2	26.2	—	—	6.1	81.5%
2017 Region	27.2	4.5	23.1	0.4	5.2	0.9	0.2	—	5.0	18.6	8.4	3.2	3.2	81.2%
2019 EP	20.2	6.9	7.4	—	13.7	1.9	—	6.0	8.0	24.8	7.2	3.8	—	66.5%
2019 Folketing	26.1	5.1	7.0	1.4	8.8	2.1	1.9	—	8.0	24.0	9.4	4.0	2.0	85.2%
2021 Local	32.3	—	23.2	—	13.0	—	—	—	1.0	25.5	5.0	—	—	81.4%
2021 Region	16.8	1.4	12.1	1.4	38.2	0.6	0.2	—	2.3	17.6	7.0	0.5	1.9	80.9%
Data from Kmdvalg.dk

=== Municipal council ===
Samsø's municipal council consists of 11 members, elected every four years. The municipal council has four political committees.

Below are the municipal council elected since the municipality's creation in 1970.

Election	Party						Total seats	Turnout	Elected mayor
Election	A	B	C	F	V	...	Total seats	Turnout	Elected mayor
1970	4	2	2		5		13		Knud Fransen (V)
1974	3	1	1		3	5	13		Knud Fransen (V)
1978	4	2	3		4		13		Knud Fransen (V)
1981	4	1	3		5		13		Emil Davidsen (V)
1985	4	1	2		3	3	13		Emil Davidsen (V)
1989	4		1	1	4	3	13		Emil Davidsen (V)
1993	3		1	2	5	2	13		John Sander Petersen (V)
1997	3	1	1	1	4	3	13		John Sander Petersen (V)
2001	2		4	2	4	2	13	86.2%	Carsten Bruun (V)
2005	2	2	2		4	1	11	78.5%	Carsten Bruun (V)
2009	1		2	2	5	1	11	79.1%	Jørn Nissen (C)
2013	3		2	1	4	1	11	82.3%	Marcel Meijer (A)
2017	5		2	1	3		11	81.5%	Marcel Meijer (A)
2021	4		2	2	3		11	81.4%	Marcel Meijer (A)
Data from Kmdvalg.dk, Statistikbanken.dk and editions of Kommunal Aarbog

=== Mayors ===
Since the 1970 Danish Municipal Reform, the mayors of Samsø Municipality have been:

#	Mayor	Party	Term
1	Knud Fransen	Venstre	1970-1981
2	Emil Davidsen	Venstre	1982-1993
3	John Sander Petersen	Venstre	1994-2001
4	Carsten Bruun	Venstre	2002-2009
5	Jørn Nissen	Conservative People's Party	2010-2013
6	Marcel Meijer	Social Democrats	2014-

== Economy ==
The largest industries on Samsø are education, healthcare, retail and agriculture.

Samsø is well known in Denmark for their early potato harvests and focus on ecology. 15% of the Danish onion harvest comes from Samsø. Other goods produced on Samsø include red cabbage and pumpkin.

Companies with their headquarters in Samsø Municipality include Brdr. Kjeldahl, a large agricultural company responsible for much of the harvest on Samsø. The company was established in 1988, with focus on potatoes and onions. Today the company has several departments and grow many different vegetables and fruits. Samsø Syltefabrik, a pickled food factory outside Permelille, is also located in the municipality. There is also a brewery and a berry company.

== Energy ==
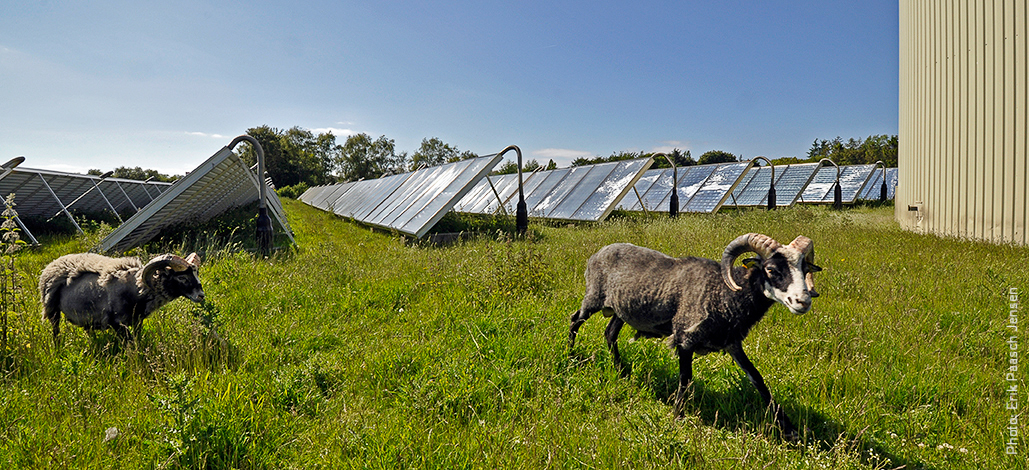
Solar cell facility between Nordby and Mårup.

100% of Samsø Municipality's electricity is provided by wind turbines and 70% of heat comes from renewable energy. The municipality has a goal of no longer using fossil fuels by 2030. Samsø's wind turbines provide more electricity than the municipality need, and has since 1997 been named 'Denmark renewable energy island'. In 2000 it was also granted the same title by the European Union and in 2002 won the European Solar Prize. There are ten turbines off the coast south of Samsø and a large solar cell facility outside Nordby. 90% of the cars on Samsø are electric cars.

== Demographics ==
Historical population
Year	Pop.	±%
1971	5,150	—
1975	4,919	−4.5%
1980	4,910	−0.2%
1985	4,693	−4.4%
1990	4,394	−6.4%
1995	4,323	−1.6%
2000	4,233	−2.1%
2005	4,125	−2.6%
2010	4,010	−2.8%
2015	3,733	−6.9%
2016	3,710	−0.6%
2017	3,724	+0.4%
2018	3,720	−0.1%
2019	3,684	−1.0%
2020	3,657	−0.7%
2021	3,682	+0.7%
Source: Statistikbanken.dk

There are 3,657 people living in Samsø Municipality (2020). 49.58% are men and 50.42% are women.

Below is the age distribution of the municipality.

Age
1. 0-5 (4.21%)
2. 6-17 (10.2%)
3. 18-35 (9.87%)
4. 36-64 (40.4%)
5. 64+ (35.3%)

== Education ==
There is 1 ground school, 1 efterskole and 2 independent schools in the municipality. There are also 2 libraries: one in Tranebjerg and one in Nordby.

== Sights ==
Samsø's central position in Denmark has made it a historically important position, and this is shown through the castles, sconces and fortifications found on the island. The island is also a popular tourist destination, and has many facilities and attractions with tourism in mind.

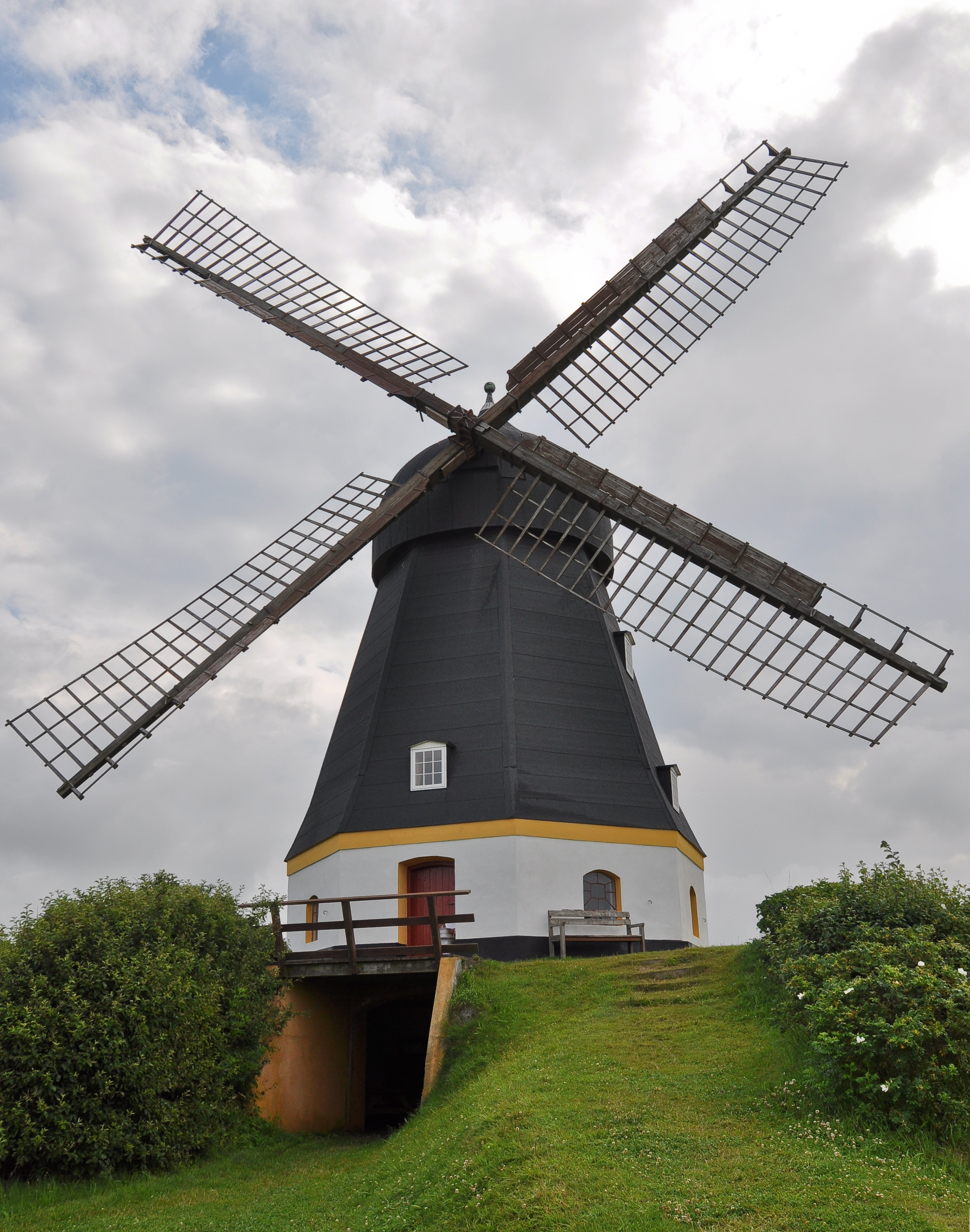
Kolby Windmill.

- Kolby Windmill (Danish: Kolby Mølle) is a Dutch-style windmill built in 1859 by Niels Olsen in Hammel. It came to Samsø in 1899 and was used as a flour mill until 1947.
- Brundby Post Mill (Danish: Brundby Stubmølle) is a post mill located north of Brundby. In the 1600s the mill was located on Endelave, but was sold to Samsø in 1683 and set up on the hill of Dansebjerg south of Brundby. It was moved in 1817 to its current location. It was in use until 1939. It is one of 16 remaining post mills in Denmark.
- The Samsø Maze (Danish: Samsø Labyrinten) is the largest natural maze in the world. It covers 60,000 m^{2} and its paths cover 5,130 m. It was designed by Erik and Karen Paulsen in 1999. It was first opened to the public on 6 May 2000.

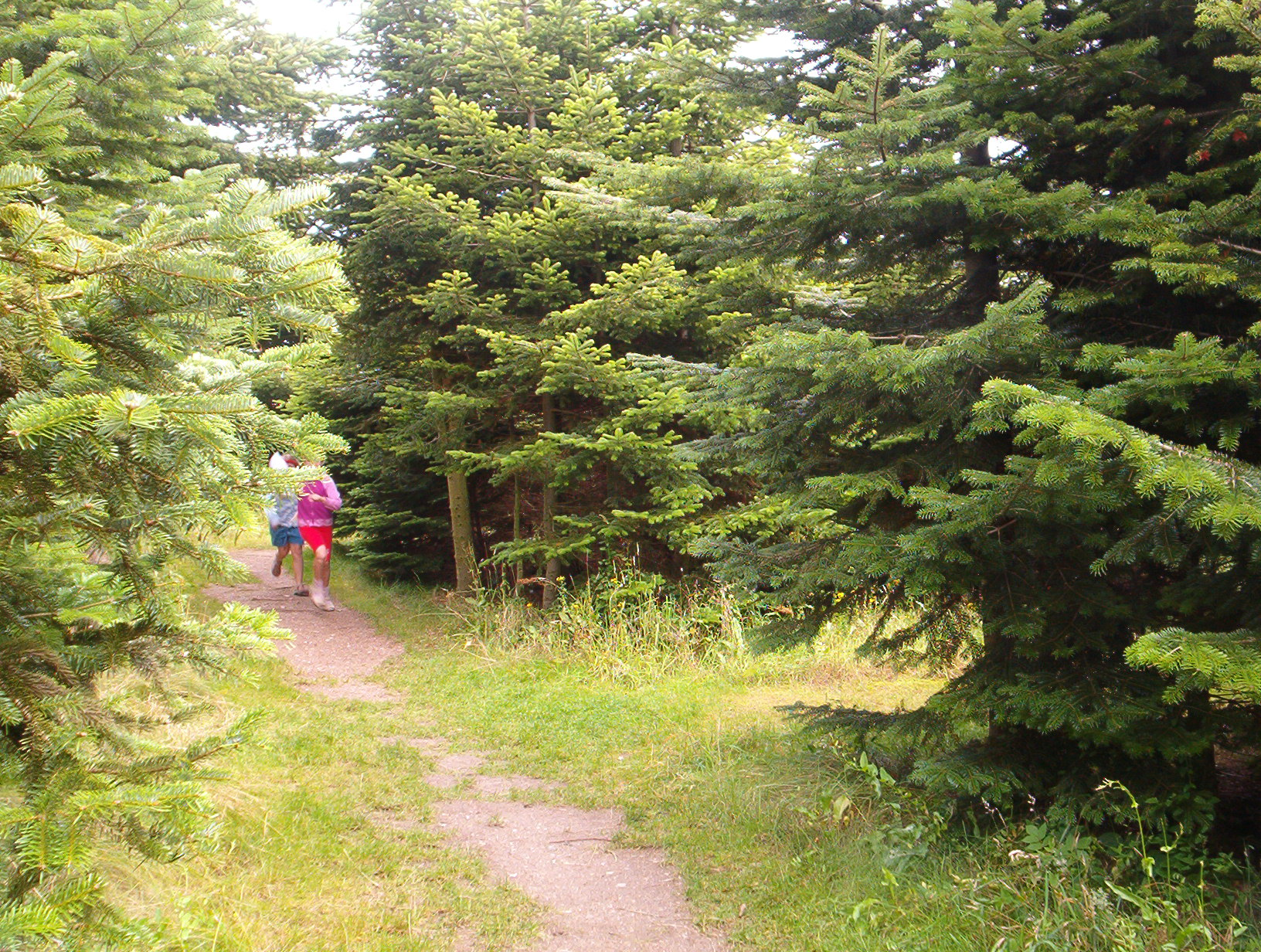
The Samsø Maze.

- Samsø Museum is a museum located in Tranebjerg. It is located in a former diary factory from 1911, and tells of the history of Samsø. An old farmhouse is associated with the museum. The farmhouse was built in 1917 and is decorated with furniture and items from the 1600s, 1700s and 1800s.
- Vesborg Lighthouse (Danish: Vesborg Fyr) is a lighthouse located on the south-western tip of Samsø. In the Middle Ages, a castle was located where Vesborg Lighthouse is located. This castle was known as Valdemar Atterdag's Castle. An exhibition about the castle and the surrounding fortifications is found in one of the lighthouse's adjacent buildings. The lighthouse was built in 1858.
- Fredensdal is a museum located in Fogedmark. It portrays the life in the 1930s, and acts as a working farm, with animals in the barns. Everything stands as in the 1930s, with only minor changes such as the installation of electric lights.
- Falcon Center Samsø (Danish: Falkecenter Samsø) is a small zoo and learning center with eagles, falcons and owls. It was established in 2009 by falconer Louise Vedel. The center hold shows with the birds and also provide educational programs for schools.

=== Castles and manors ===
There are two manors in the municipality: Brattingsborg and Bisgaard.

Bisgaard has existed since the Reformation. Before 1536 the manor was owned by the Diocese of Aarhus. In 1536 it went to the crown, and was used as residence for local priests. Countess Sophie Amalie Moth bought Bisgaard in 1688. The estate replacement law of 1919 forced Bisgaard to release half of its territory. It remained under the Danneskiold-Samsøe noble family until 1921. The manor is today owned by Brattingsborg.

==== Brattingsborg ====
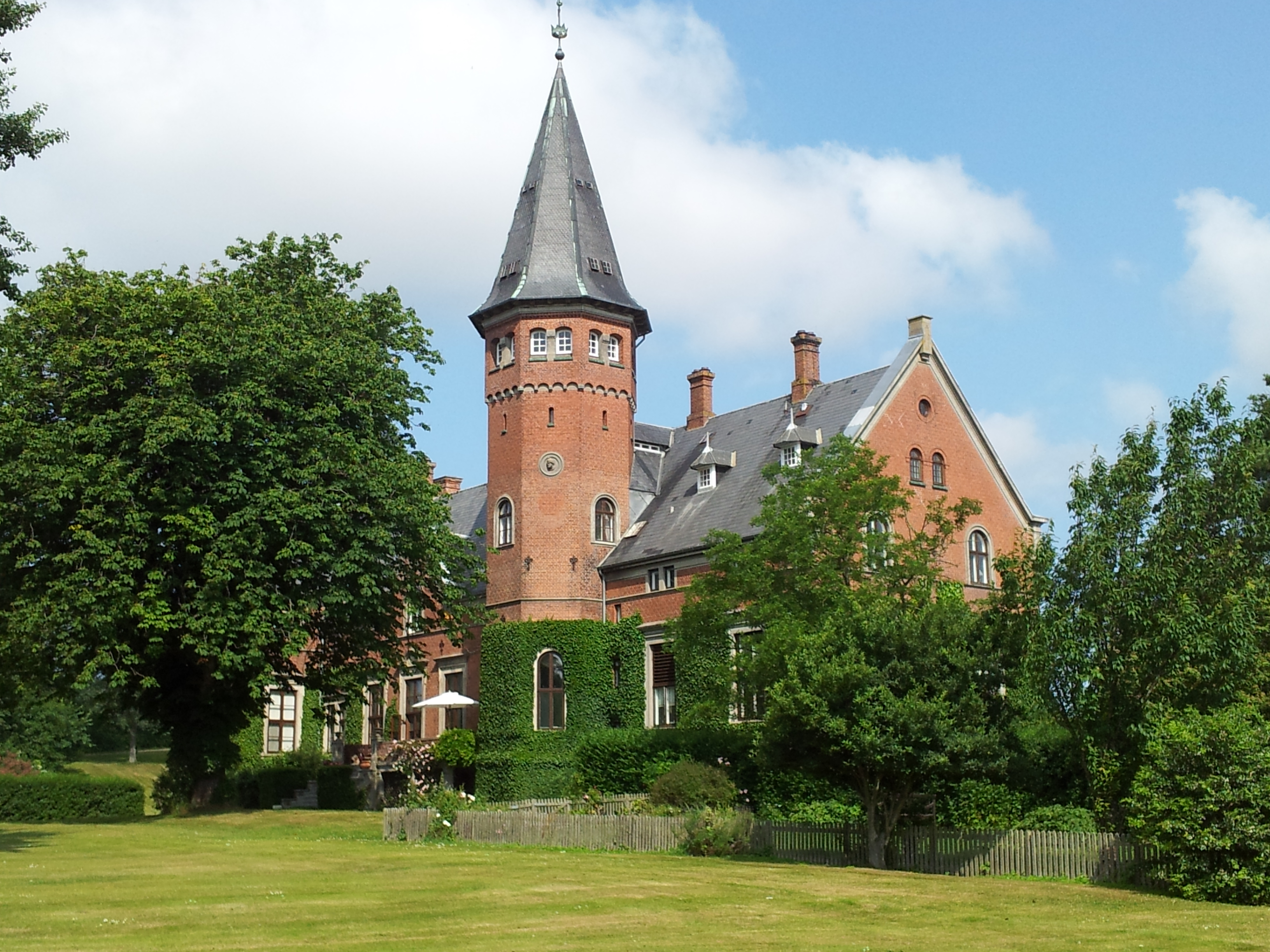
Brattingsborg Manor.

Brattingsborg is first known from 1216, where the name of the manor was Søllemarksgaard. It was owned by the crown, but was pawned off several times due to its central location in Denmark. After the Dano-Swedish War ended in 1660, Denmark was forced to hand over several manors in Scania to Sweden. Among those were manors owned by Joachim Gersdorff, who as replacement was given Brattingsborg by the crown. After his death in 1661, the manor went to his daughter, Magdalene Sybille Gersdorff, whose husband sold the manor to Peder Schumacher Griffenfeld in 1674. Griffenfeld renamed the manor from Søllemarksgaard to the present name of Brattingsborg. When he was accused of treason in 1676, all of his possessions were handed over the crow, this including Brattingsborg. When Christian V gave the island of Samsø to Sophie Amalie Moth in 1676, Brattingsborg was included. Brattingsborg was the main seat of the new Danneskiold-Samsøe noble family from 1676 to 1921.

The main building of the manor was built between 1870 and 1898 by Knud Christian Borring and Martin Borch. The buildings of Brattingsborg were protected in 2013.

Brattingsborg owns 2,367 acres, including the territory of Bisgaard and the farms of Hjalmersgård and Sannholm. This amounts to around a quarter of the land on Samsø, and also includes Vesborg Lighthouse and the harbour in Kolby Kås. The islands of Kyholm, Lindholm, Vejrø, Bosserne, Hjortholm, Mejlesholm, Yderste Holm and Karlskold are all also owned by Brattingsborg. 1,100 acres of Brattingsborg's territory is used for agriculture and 700 acres are forests.

=== Churches ===
See List of churches in Samsø Municipality

=== Events ===
Samsø is home to the yearly Samsø Festival, a music festival held in week 29 in Strandskoven. The first festival took place in 1990.

A food festival for ingredients is also hosted yearly on the island. Samsø Råvarefestival takes place in Tranebjerg and hosts many of the local food and drink companies. There is also a dinner, booths for local artisans and live music.

== Sport ==
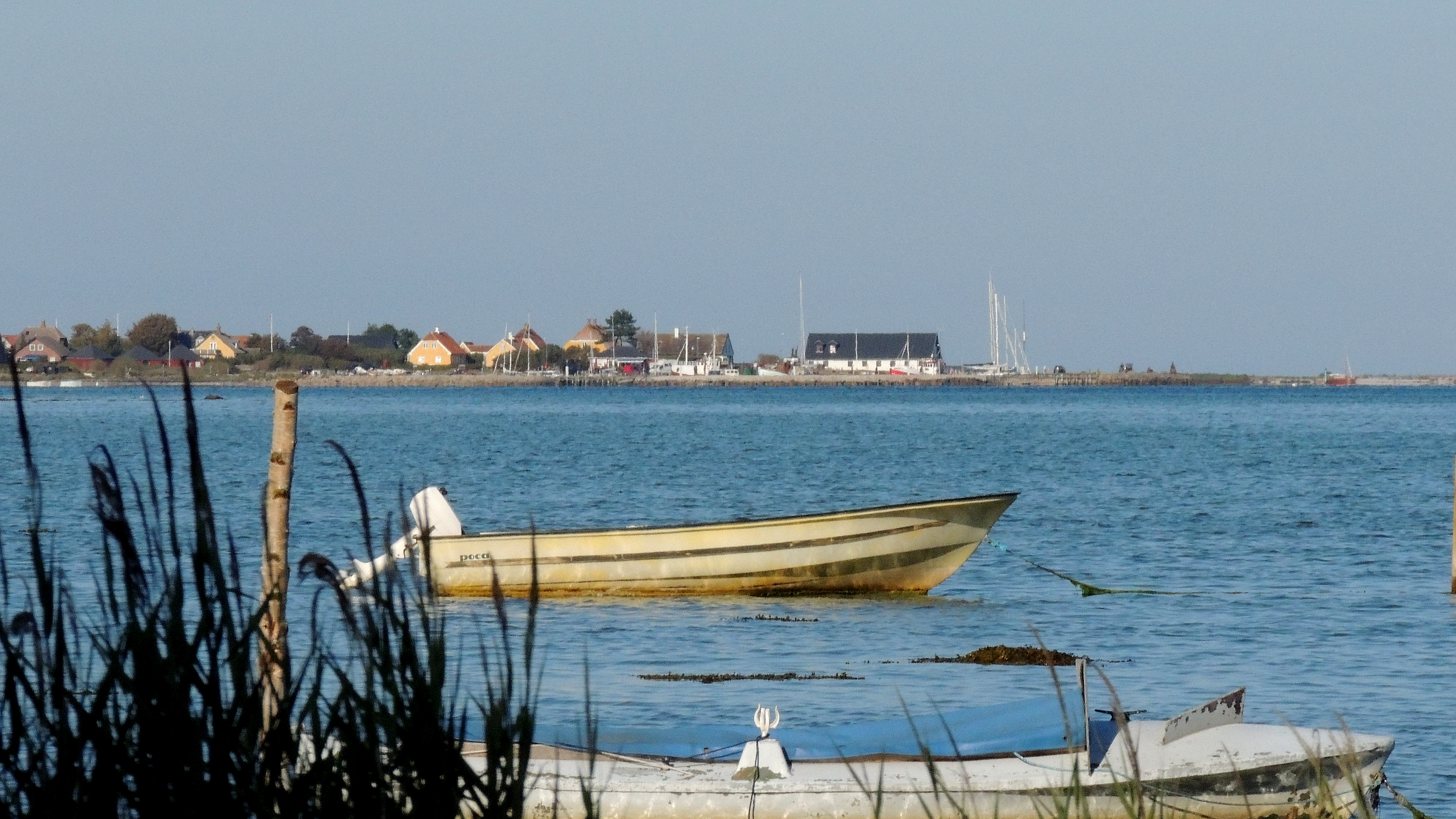
Langør, regularly used for kayaking

In Tranebjerg is SamBiosen, which is a leisure and sports center. The center is an independent organization, and also rents out rooms for conferences and sports events. The center has facilities for numerous sports, including badminton, basketball, table tennis, bridge, dart, fitness, association football, golf, gymnastics, dance, dog sports, handball, shooting, scouting, skateboarding, swimming, taekwondo, tennis, and volleyball. The many facilities allows the center to host competitions and sports events all year.

Langør is a harbour located near the Kanhave Canal, south of Nordby. The harbour is a regular spot for kayaking and rowing. The municipality also has a golf course, which is used on the Ø-Golf (lit. Island Golf) tournament, which is a tournament taking place on five Danish islands: Fanø, Langeland, Læsø, Samsø and Ærø. The municipality hosts a yearly marathon, Samsø Marathon. The marathon had 267 participants in 2021.

== Parish ==
There is 1 parish in Samsø Municipality that encompass the entire island. Shown in the table below is the population of the parish, as well as the percentage of that population that are members of the Church of Denmark. All numbers are from 1 January 2020.

Until 2014 there were five parishes in the Municipality: Nordby, Onsbjerg, Besser, Kolby and Tranebjerg. They were merged in 2014 to form the current parish.

#	Parish	Population	%	Source
1	Samsø	3,656	75.00	

== Symbols ==
Coat of Arms of Samsø Municipality.

The coat of arms of Samsø Municipality features two oars on blue background. The illustration represents the island's maritime history and culture. A similar coat of arms was used by Samsø Hundred, and is known to be used from 1584. The current version of the coat of arms was first used in 1970.

== Notable residents ==
- Ulrik Christian Gyldenløve (1678 on Brattingsborg — 1719), Count of Samsø
- Carl Frederik Sørensen (1818 in Besser — 1879), artist of marine paintings
- Lotte Glob (born 1944), ceramic artist
- Anni Bisso (born 1969 in Tranebjerg), sport shooter
