= 2025 Samsø municipal election (Denmark) =

Municipal election in Denmark

| ← 2021 | 18 November 2025 | 2029 → |

All 11 seats to the Samsø municipal council 6 seats needed for a majority
- Turnout: 2,487 (80.9%) ▼0.5%
| | First party | Second party | Third party |
|---|---|---|---|
| | C | A | F |
| Party | Conservatives | Social Democrats | Green Left |
| Last election | 2 seats, 23.2% | 4 seats, 32.3% | 2 seats, 13.0% |
| Seats won | 4 | 3 | 2 |
| Seat change | ▲2 | ▼1 | 0 |
| Popular vote | 881 | 609 | 470 |
| Percentage | 36.3% | 25.1% | 19.4% |
| Swing | ▲13.1% | ▼7.2% | ▲6.3% |
| | Fourth party |
| | V |
| Party | Venstre |
| Last election | 3 seats, 25.5% |
| Seats won | 2 |
| Seat change | ▼1 |
| Popular vote | 468 |
| Percentage | 19.3% |
| Swing | ▼6.2% |
Mayor before election
Marcel Meijer
Social Democrats
Mayor after election
Per Urban Olsen
Conservatives

The 2025 Samsø Municipal election will be held on November 18, 2025, to elect the 11 members to sit in the regional council for the Samsø Municipal council, for the Danish island of Samsø, for the period 2026 to 2029. Per Urban Olsen from the Conservatives, would win the mayoral position.

== Background ==
Following the 2021 election, Marcel Meijer from Social Democrats became mayor for his third term. However Meijer, announced that he doesn't intend to run for another term. Instead, Michael Kristensen was the mayoral candidate from the Social Democrats.

== Electoral system ==
For elections to Danish municipalities, a number varying from 9 to 31 are chosen to be elected to the municipal council. The seats are then allocated using the D'Hondt method and a closed list proportional representation. Samsø Municipality had 11 seats in 2025.

== Electoral alliances ==
=== Electoral Alliance 1 ===
| Party | | Political alignment |
|---|---|---|
| A | Social Democrats | Centre-left |
| F | Green Left | Centre-left to Left-wing |

=== Electoral Alliance 2 ===
| Party | | Political alignment |
|---|---|---|
| C | Conservatives | Centre-right |
| V | Venstre | Centre-right |

== Results by polling station ==
| Division | A | C | F | V |
| Division | % | % | % | % |
|---|---|---|---|---|
| Tranebjerg | 24.4 | 37.7 | 18.9 | 19.0 |
| Nordby Kro | 30.2 | 25.6 | 22.8 | 21.4 |

== Opinion polls ==
| Polling firm | Fieldwork date | Sample size | A | V | C | F | Lead |
|---|---|---|---|---|---|---|---|
| Epinion | 4 Sep - 13 Oct 2025 | 91 | 21.4 | 26.9 | 34.7 | 17.0 | 7.8 |
| 2024 european parliament election | 9 Jun 2024 | | 13.3 | 17.1 | 7.3 | 20.6 | 3.5 |
| 2022 general election | 1 Nov 2022 | | 25.2 | 9.1 | 16.3 | 10.9 | 8.9 |
| 2021 regional election | 16 Nov 2021 | | 16.8 | 17.6 | 12.1 | 38.2 | 20.6 |
| 2021 municipal election | 16 Nov 2021 | | 32.3 (4) | 25.5 (3) | 23.2 (2) | 13.0 (2) | 6.8 |
