= 2021 Samsø municipal election (Denmark) =

← 2017	16 November 2021	2025 →

All 11 seats to the Samsø Municipal Council 6 seats needed for a majority
- Turnout: 2,554 (81.5%) ▼0.1pp
	First party	Second party	Third party
	A	V	C
Party	Social Democrats	Venstre	Conservatives
Last election	5 seats, 41.3%	3 seats, 26.2%	2 seats, 14.7%
Seats won	4	3	2
Seat change	▼1	0	0
Popular vote	829	654	595
Percentage	32.3%	25.5%	23.2%
Swing	▼9.0%	▼0.7%	▲8.5%
	Fourth party
	F
Party	Green Left
Last election	1 seats, 9.5%
Seats won	2
Seat change	▲1
Popular vote	335
Percentage	13.0%
Swing	▲3.5%
Mayor before election
Marcel Meijer
Social Democrats
Mayor after election
Marcel Meijer
Social Democrats

Marcel Meijer from the Social Democrats had been mayor since 2014. On election night the parties from the traditional red bloc won a majority. But the Social Democrats dramatically ended up supporting Søren Wiese from Venstre, citing that "the Green Left will not support us, so we must take the next best thing".

However Ulla Holm from the Green Left later announced that they would support Marcel Meijer as mayor, and in the end Marcel Meijer would break the deal with Venstre and continue as mayor for a third term.

== Electoral system ==
For elections to Danish municipalities a number varying from 9 to 31 are chosen to be elected to the municipal council. The seats are then allocated using the D'Hondt method and a closed list proportional representation. Samsø Municipality had 11 seats in 2021

Unlike in Danish General Elections, in elections to municipal councils, electoral alliances are allowed.

== Electoral alliances ==
=== Electoral Alliance 1 ===
Party		Political alignment
A	Social Democrats	Centre-left
F	Green Left	Centre-left to Left-wing
Ø	Red–Green Alliance	Left-wing to Far-Left

=== Electoral Alliance 2 ===
Party		Political alignment
C	Conservatives	Centre-right
O	Danish People's Party	Right-wing to Far-right
V	Venstre	Centre-right

== Results by polling station ==
Division	A	C	F	O	V	Ø
Division	%	%	%	%	%	%
Tranebjerg	31.0	24.0	13.0	1.1	26.0	4.9
Nordby	41.6	17.1	13.5	1.0	21.3	5.5

== Results ==
Party		Votes	%	+/-	Seats	+/-
Samsø Municipality
A	Social Democrats	829	32.28	-9.03	4	-1
V	Venstre	654	25.47	-0.75	3	0
C	Conservatives	595	23.17	+8.51	2	0
F	Green Left	335	13.05	+3.52	2	+1
Ø	Red-Green Alliance	128	4.98	New	0	New
O	Danish People's Party	27	1.05	-1.14	0	0
Total		2,568	100	N/A	11	N/A
Invalid votes		9	0.28	-0.01		
Blank votes		17	0.53	-0.72		
Turnout		2,594	81.39	-0.10		
Source: valg.dk
