= Vesborg =

Vesborg Lighthouse
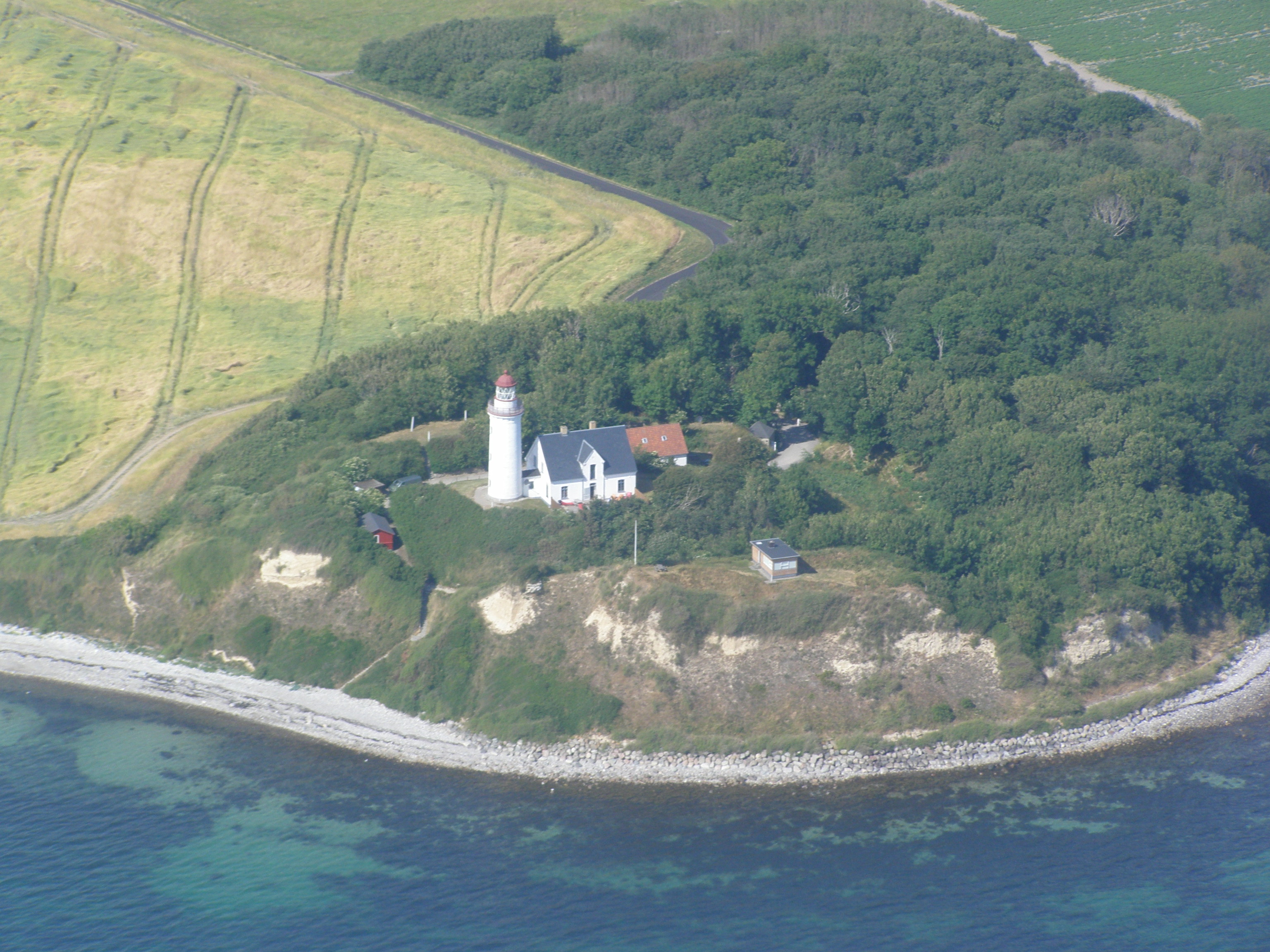
- Aerial view of Vesborg and Vesborg Lighthouse
- Location: Visborg, Samsø; Denmark
- Coordinates: 55.769897°N 10.550874°E

Tower
- Constructed: 1858
- Construction: masonry tower
- Height: 19 metres (62 ft)
- Shape: cylindrical tower with balcony and lantern
- Markings: white tower, red lantern dome and trim

Light
- Focal height: 36 metres (118 ft)
- Range: 17 nmi (31 km; 20 mi)
- Characteristic: Oc(2) W 12s
- Denmark no.: DFL-2230

Vesborg was a castle founded by King Valdemar Atterdag in the 1360s, on the southwestern coast of Samsø in Denmark. The castle does not exist anymore and a lighthouse was built on the site in 1858.

== Former Castle ==
Vesborg was initiated after the destruction of Brattingsborg Castle in the year 1289. The crown lacked a stronghold on this strategically important island and Vesborg was their remedy. It was built above 20 m tall coastal cliffs on a huge artificial hill and with a good view of the nearby sea and landscape. It gave a good view of the entrance to the straits of Lillebælt and Storebælt and large parts of the southern Kattegat sea. Few written sources mentions Vesborg, but in the wars around 1370, when Denmark faced the hostile coalition of Sweden, the Hanseatic states, the Duchy of Mecklenburg, and the County of Holstein, the knight Henrik von der Osten, is mentioned as the king's Lord Lieutenant at Vesborg. After the Danish defeat, Vesborg lost its importance and was abandoned, perhaps even before it was finished. The castle was the largest of the five known medieval castles on the island of Samsø and the castle hill is one of the largest in all of Denmark.

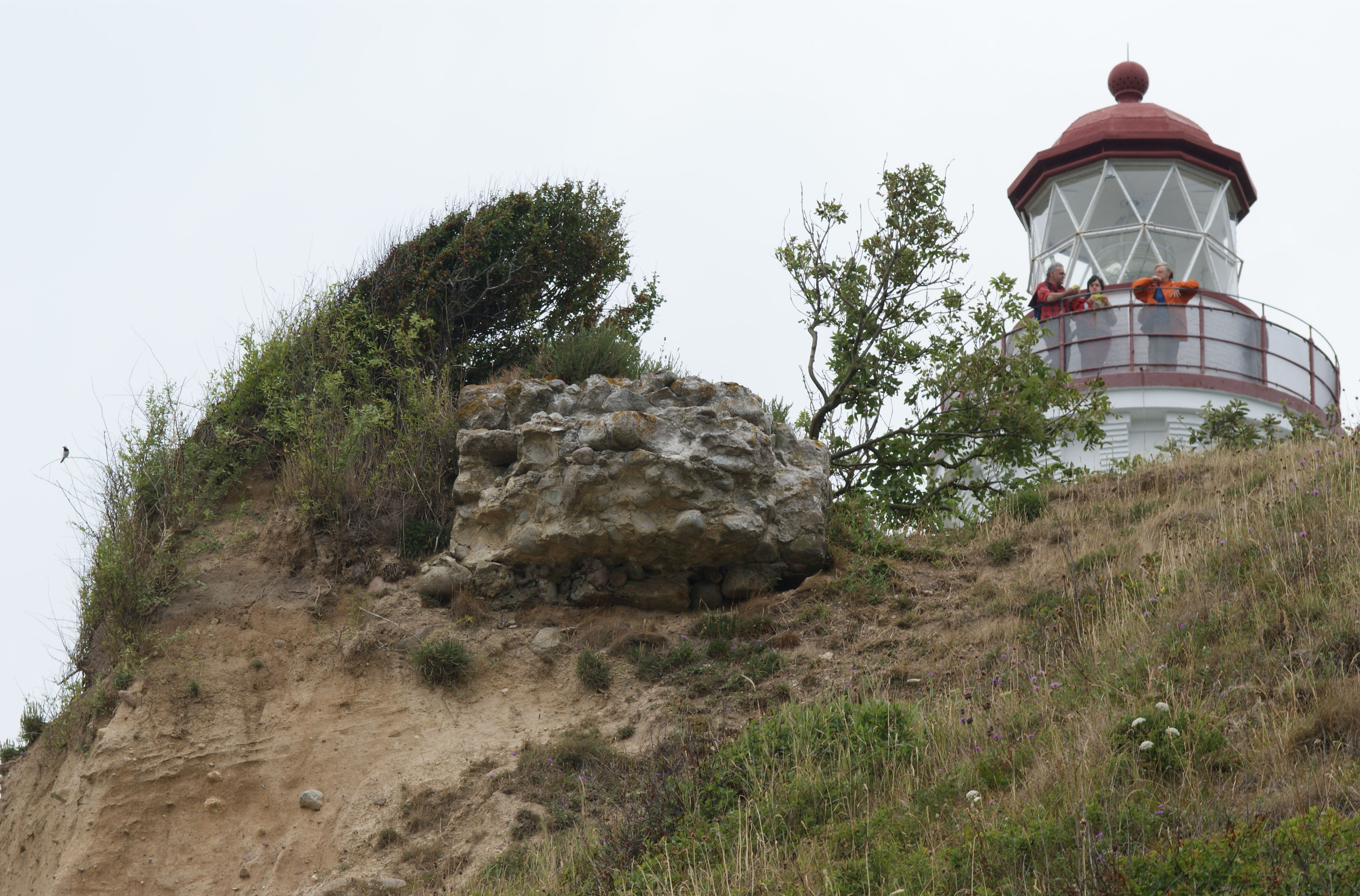
Last remains of the former Vesborg castle (2009)

Today, almost all of Vesborg has collapsed and tumbled into the sea below, the last part of the walls apparently fell under a storm on the Christmas Eve of 1875. The only remains is a small part of the foundations of a gate tower that would have guarded a drawbridge over the impressive moat. The moat was up to 10,5 m deep and 20 m wide, and is particularly well preserved. The access road is located on the Eastern hill, it is 4 m wide, cobbled with small stones and shows no signs of wear.

The site and surroundings was subject to an archaeological examination in 2009, as part of a larger project concerning all the known castle sites of Samsø. It was conducted as a very broad cooperation between the National Museum of Denmark, Moesgård Museum, Ecomuseum Samsø and the Cultural Heritage Agency.

The name Vesborg literally means "Ves"-castle or "Ves"-fortress in English. In its earliest known written form "Ves" was spelled "Wes" and is most likely derived from the Old Norse "Veisa", or the dialect "Vese", meaning "a swampy place". The areas East, North and West of the castle hill are lowlying and have at some point during the castle's foundation been rather swampy or wet.

== The lighthouse ==
A lighthouse of 19 m, was erected on the site in 1858, named after the old castle. Because of the cliffs and the castle hill, it has a focal height of 36 m. On clear days it is possible to see Zealand, the head of Funen, parts of northern Funen, Æbelø, Endelave and the long coastline of Jutland.

Vesborg Lighthouse have a powder magazine, previously used as storage facility for fog signals and nowadays hosting a small exhibition about the medieval castles of Samsø. The lighthouse belongs to Brattingsborg Manor and is the only lighthouse on the island.

== See also ==
- List of lighthouses and lightvessels in Denmark

== Sources and references ==
- Vesborg National Museum of Denmark 2010. Danish text, with an English summary.
- Etting, Vivian et.al (2018): "Borgene på Samsø", University of Southern Denmark Studies in History and Social Sciences, Vol. 558, (in Danish)
- Vesborg Lighthouse Brattingsborg Manors homepage. (in Danish)
- Vesborg A private homepage. Collection of images and information on Danish Lighthouses. (in Danish)
