= Harvard Summer School =

Summer school program

- Type: Private
- Established: 1871
- Parent institution: Harvard Faculty of Arts and Sciences, Division of Continuing Education
- Dean: Sandra Naddaff
- Location: Cambridge, Massachusetts, United States
- Campus: Urban
- Website: summer.harvard.edu

Harvard Summer School, founded in 1871, is a summer school run by Harvard University. It serves more than 5,000 students per year.

== History ==
Harvard Summer School was founded in 1871. It is the first academic summer session established and the oldest summer school present in the United States. The Summer School is part of the Harvard Faculty of Arts and Sciences and is one of the principal programs within the Harvard Division of Continuing Education.

== Academics ==
Each summer, more than 5,000 students arrive from across the U.S. and more than 100 foreign countries. Students from American and foreign universities often enroll in the school to study for seven weeks with Harvard faculty as well as visiting scholars from other institutions. The Summer School does not offer any degrees but grants academic credits.

The Summer School offers more than 300 daytime and evening classes in over 60 disciplines. Among its offerings are the Pre-College Program, the Ukrainian Summer Institute, and a study abroad program. Study abroad programs feature hands-on experiences, ranging from language studies in Georgia to archaeological digs in Tønnesminde, Denmark.
