= Tønnesminde =

Archaeological site and organic farm on Samsø, Denmark

- Location of the site in Denmark
- 55°48′36.122″N 10°37′25.337″E
- Type: Settlement
- Periods: Early Neolithic (Funnel Beaker Culture); Late Neolithic/Early Bronze Age; Pre-Roman Iron Age; Viking Age; Present times (19th century to modern day)
- Location: Samsø, Denmark

Site notes
- Excavation dates: 1999, 2014-2017

Tønnesminde is the site of an archaeological excavation ground and present-day organic farm on the Danish island of Samsø. Archaeological evidence attests the area around Tønnesminde has a long history of human occupation, dating from approximately 4000 BC. Recent excavations suggest that Tønnesminde contains settlements dating from the Funnelbeaker culture in the Early Neolithic period, Early Bronze Age, Pre-Roman Iron Age, and Viking Age.

== Excavations ==
=== 1999 ===
Excavations began at Tønnesminde when the Danish National Museum investigated a 500 m² area northwest of the farm in preparation for sewage pipeline construction in 1999. Archaeologists excavated the remains of a house, four large pits, a fence, a cultural layer, and a few postholes. Finds included flint flakes, a fishing net anchor ("netsynk"), and ceramics.

=== 2010 ===
Interest in the Tønnesminde area resumed in 2010 with a metal detector survey launched by Moesgaard Museum and Samsø Museum in the hopes of learning more about Viking Age military establishments on Samsø and finding sites for additional excavations. The survey has increased the number of metal artifacts from the island, changed the conception of Samsø's settlement history, particularly in regards to the Iron Age, and renewed interest in Tønnesminde.

=== 2014 ===
After the rediscovery of the site by the metal detector campaign, excavations resumed at Tønnesminde in 2014 as a joint investigation between Moesgaard Museum and Harvard Summer School Viking Studies Program. A trial excavation composed of five trial trenches began at Tønnesminde on March 24, 2014 and revealed remains from Pre-Roman Iron Age and Viking Age settlements. In June and July 2014, archaeologists from Moesgaard Museum and Aarhus University as well as students from Harvard excavated three separate trenches, totaling an area of 1100 m², and examined four pit houses, one three-aisled long house, and numerous pits and postholes. Several of the postholes suggested the previous presence of a fence and a small structure. A fifth pit house was discovered but not excavated, and a trial trench suggested it could be the remains of a burnt house.

Finds included animal bones, charcoal, pottery, beads, flint debris, an arrowhead, and items typical of Viking Age pit houses, which includes but is not limited to loom weights, spindle whorls, fragments of soap stone vessel, pottery shards, and glass beads. The investigation additionally discovered circular crop marks nearby, which could constitute ring ditches around graves.

=== 2015 ===
Excavations at Tønnesminde the following summer represented a continuation of the 2014 excavation. Archaeologists excavated approximately 1150 m² in two new separate areas and investigated four pit houses and several pits and postholes.

Three of the pit houses may provide evidence of textile production because of the discovery of spindle whorls and loom weights.

The fourth pit house featured large amounts of charcoal, iron slag, iron nails and rivets, hammerscale, and multiple whetstones, leading to the conclusion that the pit house may have operated as a smithy. Additional finds included other usual Viking Age items, ceramic fragments, flint debris and scrapers, and animal bones.

=== 2016 ===
During the 2016 excavations at Tonnesminde, archaeologists studied a Late Iron Age or Early Viking Age long house, several cooking pits, a large cultural layer, and many pits and postholes. Finds included bone fragments, ceramics, flint flakes and scrapers, charcoal and grain (collected from flotation samples).

=== 2017 ===
The 2017 excavation covered an area of 1200m2 containing three Viking Age pit houses of varying depths, as well as two cooking pits and over one hundred postholes. Finds included worked pieces of flint from the Stone Age, two spindle whorls, a small piece of amber, and a wide array of ceramic pieces, several of which were rim sherds from the Viking Age. Many bones, including a large jawbone with one tooth attached to it, were found in one of the pit houses, pit C-14. The same pit house contained layers of burnt, red clay in the northern side of the unit, suggesting that the pit house or at least remnants of it was burned down after its destruction.

== Archaeological Discoveries ==
=== Early Neolithic (Funnel Beaker Culture) ===
The initial excavation of Tønnesminde in 1999 revealed flint flakes from polished axes, possibly from the Funnel Beaker Culture. The 2014 and 2015 excavations also found flint flakes, including an arrow head, which again indicates settlement during the late Mesolithic or Early Neolithic period. The 2016 excavation additionally discovered flint scrapers and flakes, as well as ceramic fragments, the patterns of which suggest they were created by the Funnel Beaker Culture. A decorated ceramic shard and several flint tools found during the 2017 excavation have been attributed to the Early Neolithic period.

=== Bronze Age ===
The 1999 excavation found potential house remnants, which the archaeologists dated to the late Neolithic period or early Bronze Age because of its proximity to cultural layers containing artifacts likely from the early Bronze Age, namely, a stone axe and a ceramic rim shard. The largely undated flint flakes discovered in the 2014, 2015, and 2016 excavations also could indicate habitation of Tønnesminde during the early Bronze Age.

=== Pre-Roman Iron Age ===
The excavation in 1999 investigated several pits cautiously attributed to the Pre-Roman Iron Age based on ceramics characteristic of this period. The pits also contained flint flakes, but because the flint collection likely contained older pieces, they were difficult to date. The 2014 investigation of a three aisle long house revealed pottery shards likely from the Pre-Roman Iron Age in one of its roof-bearing posts, as well as in several pits. The 2015 excavation examined a feature, interpreted as a cooking pit, which contained a significant amount of ceramics dated to the Pre-Roman Iron Age.

=== Viking Age ===
While the investigation in 1999 did not reveal any Viking Age artifacts, subsequent excavations at Tønnesminde have found significant evidence of a Viking Age settlement. The 2014 excavation unearthed spindle whorls, glass beads, loom weights, whetstones, iron rivets, and iron knives in presumably Viking Age pit houses. Nearby postholes likely belong to other Viking Age buildings, although the postholes lacked dateable material. Similarly, the 2015 excavation found spindle whorls, loom weights, iron rivets and nails, and whetstones from pit houses; other excavated postholes probably derive from the Viking Age but could not be dated due to a dearth of dateable material. The long house excavated by the 2016 team could have functioned as an 'economy house' ('økonomibygning' in Danish) during the Viking Age. An older, nearby large cultural layer intersects the long house, and based on the discovery of half of a loom weight and the general structure of the long house, on-site archaeologists dated the long house to the Late Iron Age or Early Viking Age. Similarly, the 2017 excavation unearthed two spindle whorls and many ceramic rim shards that are characteristic of the Viking Age.

== Significance ==
=== Handicraft production ===
Using the artifacts recovered by the 2014-2016 excavations, archaeologists hope to better understand Viking Age activity on Samsø, particularly craft production. The pit houses investigated in 2014 and 2015 show evidence of textile production. Textiles can reflect both long-distance trading networks and daily needs, such as bedding, packing material, sails, and other products. With more information from Tønnesminde, it may be possible to connect textile production at Tønnesminde with, for example, the Kanhave Canal and the likely fleet stationed there during the Viking Age. Perhaps the textiles were used to repair Viking Age sails, replace clothing, or trade. A pit house investigated in 2015 was identified as a Viking Age smithy. Because of the accessibility of ore, remains from smithing can be found throughout Scandinavia, and smithing a common metal craft rather than a trade reserved for specialists. Smithing occurred in both rural farms and towns, so further investigation of Tønnesminde is needed to categorize the settlement. Nevertheless, the presence of the smithy provides more information about handicraft production on Samsø and helps place Samsø within the broader context of Viking Age Scandinavian settlements.

Evidence of handicraft production is further strengthened by the 2017 excavation, which revealed two spindle whorls in one of the pit houses, C15, one of which is intact. The absence of any other significant artifacts in that pit house strongly suggests that the feature has been exclusively used for textile production purposes.

=== Viking Age trade ===
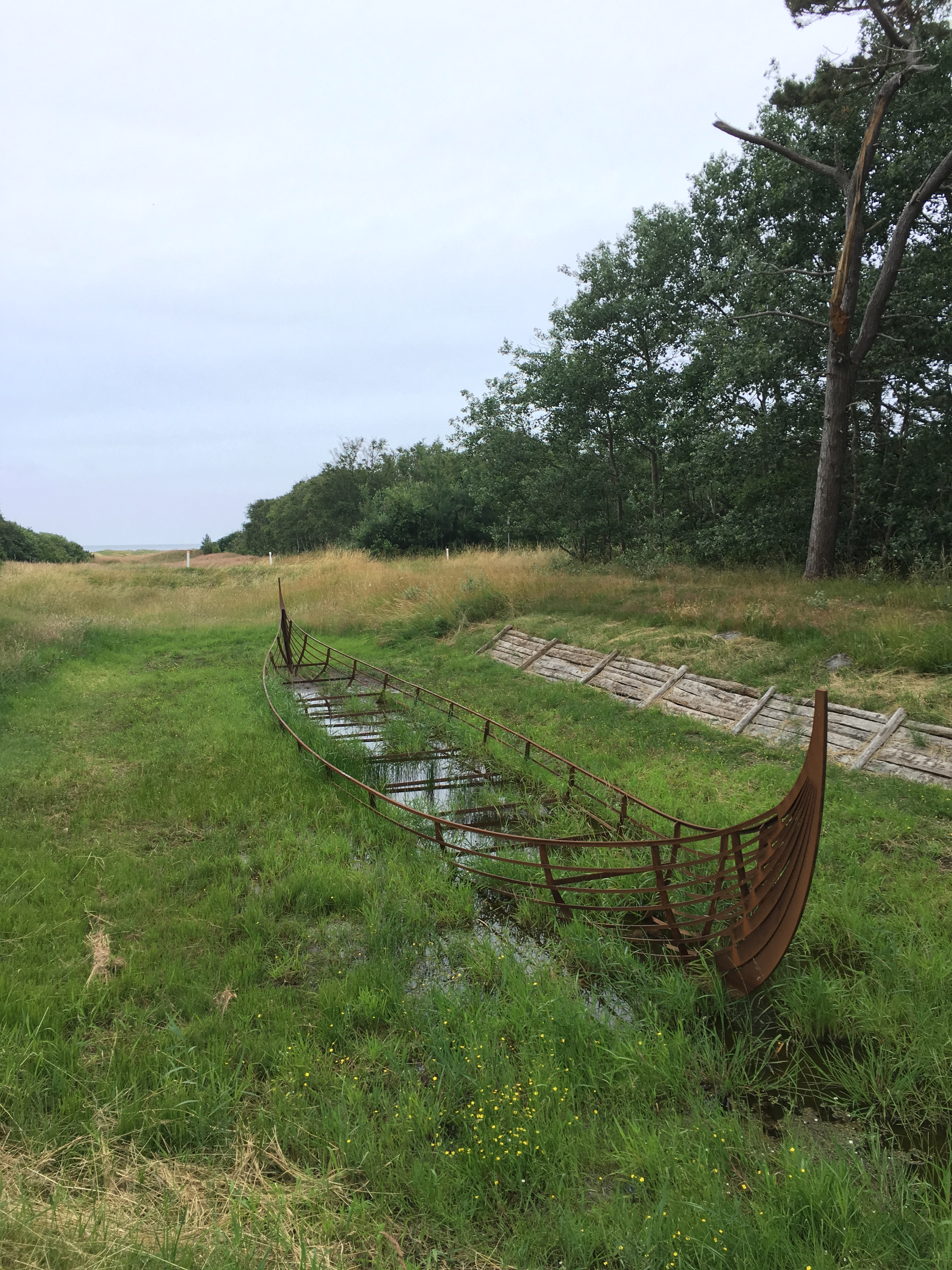
The Kanhave Canal in 2016 with a full-scale model of a Viking Age ship and a reconstruction of a part of the bulwark.

The excavations at Tønnesminde will greatly add to current knowledge about Samsø and Viking Age trade. The Kanhave Canal, which has been dated, using dendrochronology, to 726 CE (before the beginning of the Viking Age) based on the wood used for its construction, indicates the importance of the island in the Viking Age, since construction of the 500m canal would have required centralized planning, extensive manual labor, and significant funding. Given Samsø's central location, the canal would have enabled a fleet to control ship traffic through Danish waters and better levy taxes. While the Kanhave Canal indicates a Viking Age presence on the island, the lack of additional Viking Age evidence does not allow characterization of this presence.

Around the time of the construction of the Kanhave Canal, Scandinavia focused increasingly on trade, cultural contacts, and warfare with neighboring areas; these changes affected craft production as craftsmen and their creations became more important. Indeed, other Scandinavian sites demonstrate extensive long-distance exchange, far more than elsewhere in northern Europe. As one of the few excavations on Samsø, Tønnesminde has added greatly to knowledge of Viking Age trade on the island.

The work houses at Tønnesminde could be connected to this expanding trade and the central location of Samsø. Part of a Norwegian soapstone vessel, found by the 2015 team, provides evidence of trade at Viking Age Tønnesminde. Norway is particularly known for soapstone quarries, and soapstone vessels have been found throughout Scandinavia as trade increased. The whetstones found by the 2014 and 2015 teams provide further evidence for craft production and possible subsequent trade at Tønnesminde, as whetstones were another trade item increasingly produced during the Viking Age.

Supplementing the Norwegian soapstone vessel find, the 2017 excavation revealed an almost perfectly round slate dish in the pit house C-14, . The absence of slate in Denmark implies that the dish must have been imported either from Norway or Sweden. The presence of soapstone on the site suggests that the dish was indeed imported from Norway, further adding to the evidence of trade at Tønnesminde.
