= Brattingsborg Castle =

Coordinates: 55.8342°N 10.5841°E

Brattingsborg Castle (Gammel Brattingsborg) was a royal castle in the town of Tranebjerg on Samsø, Denmark. Brattingsborg castle shared its name with the manor house Brattingsborg (Brattingsborg Gods). To distinguish the two, the former castle is commonly referred to as Old Brattingsborg (Gammel Brattingsborg).

== History ==
The castle was erected at some point in the 12th century but destroyed and burned down in a battle led by the outlawed Stig Andersen Hvide in the year 1289. After its destruction, the Crown decided to construct the castle of Vesborg on the south coast. The only remains of Brattingsborg are the earth-mounds of the castle hill along with traces of its double-moat defences and foundations.

The castle hill was thoroughly investigated by archaeologists from the National Museum of Denmark and Moesgård Museum in 2008, as part of a larger project, concerning all of Samsø's five medieval castles. They collaborated with Samsø Museum and the Cultural Heritage agency. The excavations revealed remains of a former church (25 m long and 8.5 m wide), inside the castle grounds and suggests, that the church caught fire in the violent conflict of 1289, but that it was in use for some years after and then superseded by Tranebjerg Church just 100 m away. There were hints of an even older wooden church at the site and it was clear from the start, that the castle hill had been important since at least the Bronze Age, as Brattingsborg itself was founded on a barrow from that period.

== Other Sources ==
- Gammel Brattingsborg The National Museum of Denmark
- Etting, Vivian et.al (2018): Borgene på Samsø University of Southern Denmark Studies in History and Social Sciences, Vol. 558, (in Danish)
