= Anne Marie Løn =

Danish writer

- Born: 1947 (age 78–79)
- Occupation: Writer: journalist, novelist
- Notable works: Hvorfor hvisker I til mig? (Why Do You Whisper To Me?), Veras vrede (Vera's Anger), Foretid (Times Past), Den sorte liste (The Black List)
- Notable awards: Weekendavisen Book Award (1998)

Anne Marie Løn (born 1947) is a Danish writer who initially worked as a journalist in Copenhagen for newspapers including the tabloid B.T.. As a novelist, she made her debut with Hvorfor hvisker I til mig? (Why Do You Whisper To Me?) in 1977, followed in 1982 by the more successful Veras vrede (Vera's Anger), in which she expresses her frustration with city life and its tabloids. Her love of the countryside is apparent in many later works such as Foretid (Times Past, 1984) or Den sorte liste (The Black List, 1988). Her awards include the cherished Weekendavisen Book Award in 1998.

== Early life ==
Born on 12 July 1947 in the parish of Tranebjerg on the Danish island of Samsø, Anne Marie Løn was the daughter of the veterinarian Otto Løn (1914–85) and his wife, the registrar Ingerid Glob (born 1915). With her partner, the veterinarian Erik Dam Sørensen, she had three children: Ida (1879), Emil (1984) and Nina (1985). The youngest of the family's four children, she was raised in Vendsyssel in the north of Jutland where her father first had a practice. When she was 12, following her father, the family moved to Herning. There she completed her education with bookkeeping and clerical work.

== Career ==
After working as a trainee for the Frederikshavns Avis (1966–69), she joined the daily Vestkysten where she wrote mainly about schools and education. In the early 1970s, she spent extended periods in France and Italy where she studied drama. On returning to Denmark, after a short period as press secretary for Aalborg Teater she moved to Copenhagen where from 1973 she worked for B.T. for the next six years.

In parallel, she published her first novel Hvorfor hvisker I til mig? (1977) about the dreams and aspirations of a French perpetual student. After leaving B.T., in 1979 she moved to the provinces devoting herself full time to writing. After publishing a biography of Adda Ravnkilde in 1978, she presented the joys of the countryside in her next three novels: Veras vrede (1982), Fodretid (1984) and Den sorte liste (1988).

Later works include Sent bryllup (Late Wedding, 1990) about the memories of an elderly woman, Det store nummer (The Big Number, 1992) revealing the advantages of work in a circus over the pressures of life in the city. The highly acclaimed Prinsesserne (The Princesses, 1996) depicts the quite untypical lives of two well-to-do women from Vendsyssel at the beginning of the century, while her award-winning Dværgenes dans (The Dwarf's Dance, 1998) tells the story of the musically talented dwarf Tyge and his family and his dreams of romance. Hvis barn (Whose Child, 2002) presents the sad outcome of a young nurse in Tanzania and her illegitimate baby. Her most recent work, Sekstetten (The Sextet) was published in 2008. It is based on an incident which actually occurred in Copenhagen in the 1920s and reports on how a new administrator discovered how a group of six had been swindling for years.

== Awards ==
Anne Marie Løn has received a number of awards including the Danish Literature Prize for Women (Dansk Litteraturpris for Kvinder) in 1995, the Weekendavisen Book Award for Dvergenes dans in 1998, Tagea Brandt Rejselegat in 2001 and De Gyldne Laurbær in 2001.
