= Brattingsborg =

Coordinates: 55°47′2″N 10°35′9″E

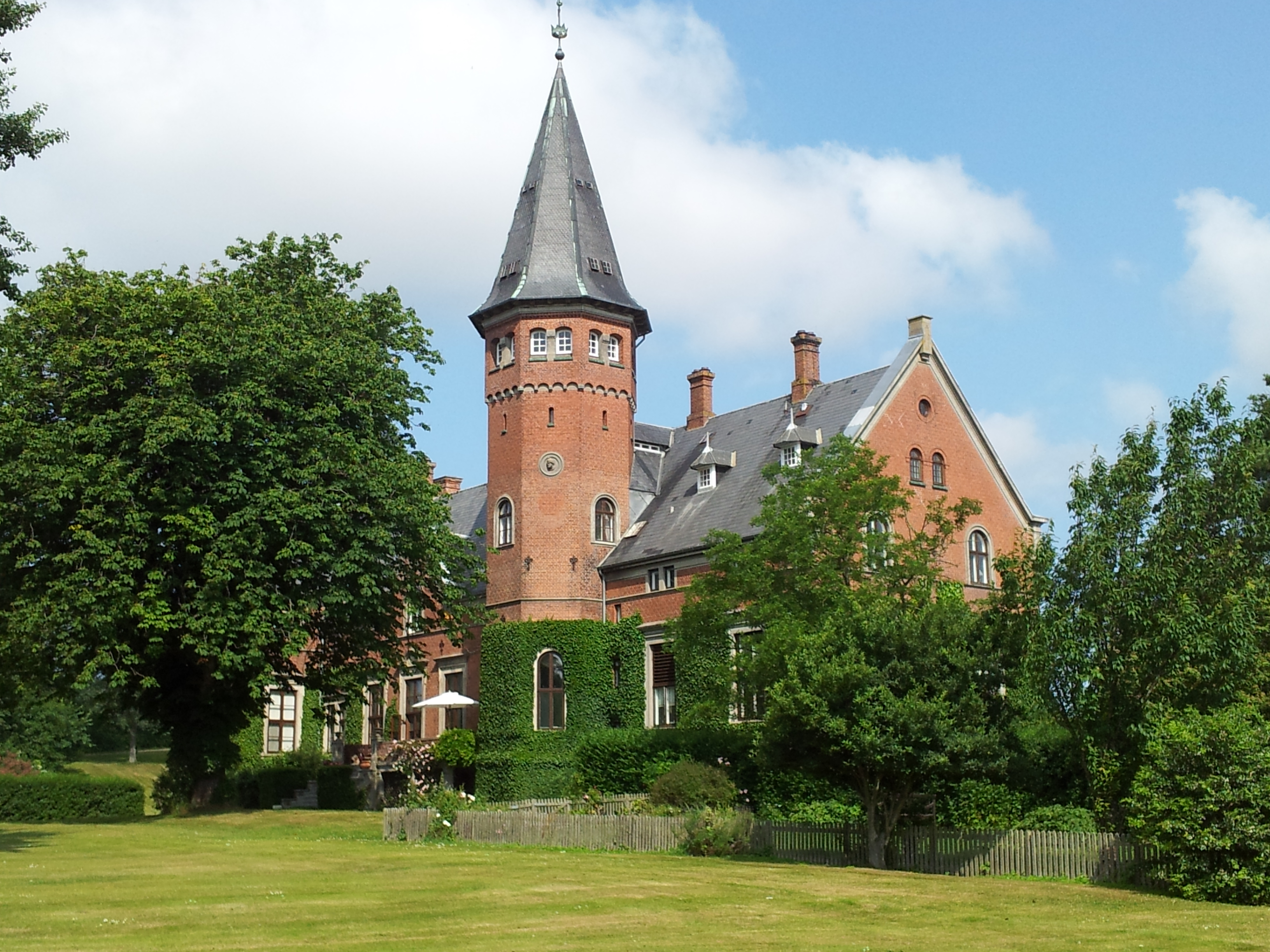
The manor house of Brattingsborg.

Brattingsborg is a manor house and estate located 6 km (3.7 mi) south of Tranebjerg, on the Danish island of Samsø.

The estate produces bread and potatoes for Danish supermarkets under the brand Brattingsborg.

== History ==
The history of the estate goes back to 1120 when it was the king's property on the island of Samsø. Originally called Søllemarksgård, it was renamed Brattingsborg by Griffenfeld who owned the island from 1674 to 1676. The manor have taken its name from an old and now non-existent royal castle in the town of Tranebjerg, called Gammel Brattingsborg (English: Old Brattingsborg). From 1677 to 1921, Brattingsborg was the seat of the counts of Samsøe, established for Christian V's mistress, Sophie Amalie Moth, and her descendants. The associated Danneskiold-Samsøe family still own the property.

Christian Frederik began constructing today's main building in 1870. Designed by Knud Borring, it was completed in 1898 by Martin Borch. Built in the Neogothic style, it is inspired by English trends. The outhouses from 1870 are among the first buildings in Denmark to be constructed in concrete. The Brattingsborg estate covers 2,376 ha (5,870 acres), nearly a quarter of the area of Samsø. Covering an area of 6 ha (15 acres), the park is also inspired by English country gardens, falling naturally into the surrounding landscape. In the garden of Brattingsborg manor, the small fortification of Blafferholmen was excavated in 2012 by the National Museum of Denmark. It was founded on top of a stone age dolmen in the 1300s, in an age of conflict. It burned down shortly after it was built apparently, but there was no signs of any battle.

Today, the Brattingsborg estate is managed by Anders Danneskiold Lassen. With a staff of 20, it is run as a modern concern with a focus on agriculture, pig production, forestry, hunting and housing rental. In 2008, in collaboration with Dansk Supermarked, Brattingsborg began producing five types of bread for sale in all Føtex and Bilka stores. In 2010, the business was extended to include the sale of potatoes. In the summer it is possible to visit Brattingsborg park for a stroll, in return of a small fee.

== Lords of Brattingsborg ==
- (1216–1660) The Crown
- (1660–1661) Joachim von Gersdorff
- (1661) Magdalene Sybille Joachimsdatter von Gersdorff (married name: Bielke)
- (1661–1674) Jørgen Bielke
- (1674–1676) Peder Schumacher Griffenfeld
- (1676) Christian V
- (1676–1719) Sophie Amalie Poulsdatter Moth, Countess of Samsøe
- (1719–1728) Christian, Count of Danneskiold-Samsøe
- (1728–1740) ?
- (1740–1778) Frederik Christian, Count of Danneskiold-Samsøe
- (1778–1823) Christian Conrad Sophus, Count of Danneskiold-Samsøe
- (1823–1869) Frederik Christian, Count of Danneskiold-Samsøe
- (1869–1886) Christian Conrad Sophus, Count of Danneskiold-Samsøe
- (1886–1914) Christian Frederik, Count of Danneskiold-Samsøe
- (1914–1945) Aage Conrad, Count of Danneskiold-Samsøe
- (1945–1985) Elisabeth Henriette Aagesdatter, Countess of Danneskiold-Samsøe (married name: Lassen)
- (1985–present) Anders Aage Schau Danneskiold Lassen
