= Samsø Airport =

Samsø Airport Samsø Flyveplads
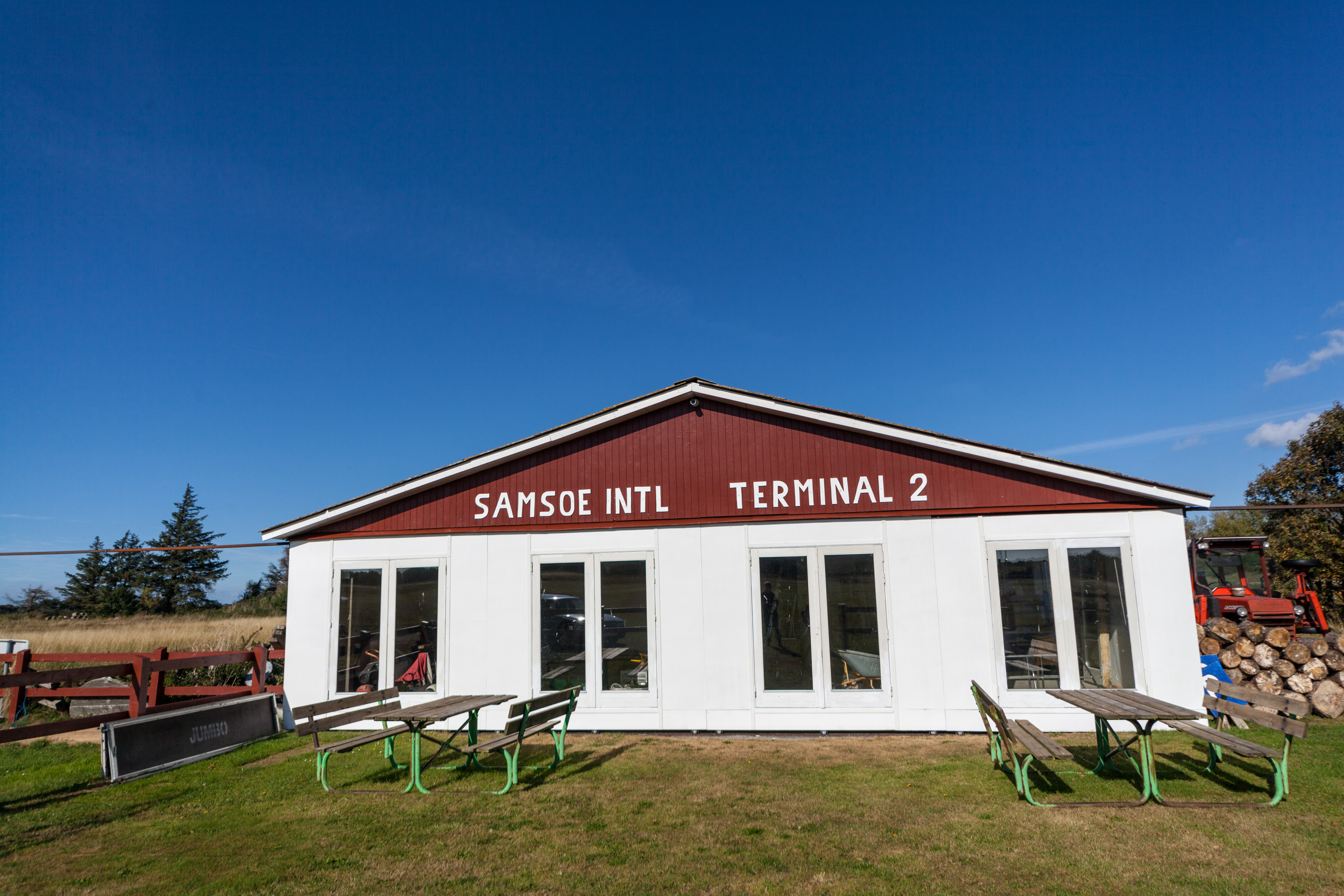
- International Terminal 2
- IATA: none; ICAO: EKSS

Summary
- Location: Samsø, Denmark
- Elevation AMSL: 0 ft / 0 m
- Coordinates: 055°53′23″N 010°36′40″E
- Interactive map of Samsø Airport

Runways
Direction	Length		Surface
Direction	ft	m	Surface
10/28		695	Grass

Samsø Airport is an airport on Samsø, Denmark.
