= Samsø =

Danish Island

Nickname: "The island in the middle"
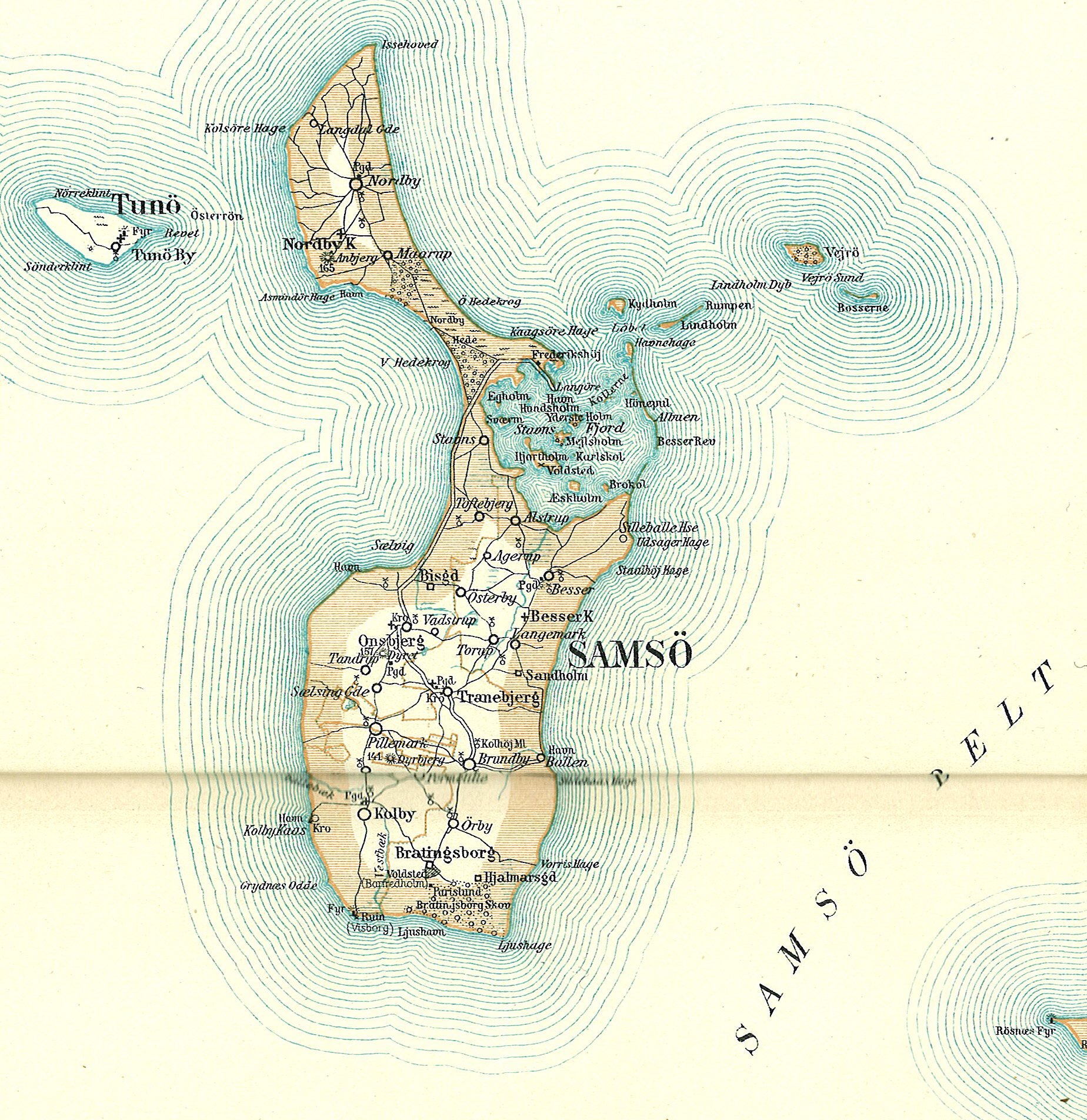
- An old map of Samsø, Denmark

Geography
- Location: Kattegat
- Coordinates: 55°52′00″N 10°37′00″E
- Area: 112 km^{2} (43 sq mi)
- Highest elevation: 64 m (210 ft)
- Highest point: Ballebjerg

Administration
- Denmark
- Region: Central Denmark Region
- Municipality: Samsø Municipality
- Largest settlement: Tranebjerg (pop. 829)

Demographics
- Population: 3,724 (2017)
- Pop. density: 33/km^{2} (85/sq mi)

Samsø (Anglicized: "Samso" or "Samsoe") is a Danish island in the Kattegat 15 kilometers (9.3 mi) off the Jutland Peninsula. Samsø is located in Samsø municipality. The community has 3,724 inhabitants (2017) (January 2010: 4,010) called Samsings and is 114 km^{2} (44 sq mi) in area. Due to its central location, the island was used during the Viking Age as a meeting place. The etymology of the island's name is unknown.

In 1997, Samsø won a government competition to become a model renewable energy community. Now 100% of its electricity comes from wind power and biomass.

== Etymology ==
The name Samsø is of unknown origin. The name is known from 1075 as Samse. This word is a simplex and the addition of -ø, Danish for 'island', is thus a later compounding, known in toponymy as epexegesis.

== Geography ==
The beach and village of Ballen, Samsø are popular with visitors. The island is served by a bus service which runs around the island, including the two ferry terminals in Sælvig and Ballen. The peninsula of Helgenæs to the north is visible in clear weather. Geographically, the island divides into three areas:

- the North Island
- the Stavns Fjord
- the South Island

The soil and geology of the northern part of the island is made up of sand and gravel deposited during the deglaciation, while the southern part is made of both areas of boulder clay (Danish: moræneler) and outwash plains (Danish: smeltevandsslette).

The North Island is divided from the South Island by the artificial Kanhave canal. Here a larger part of the countryside is uncultivated and it presents a wavy landscape of meadows and small patches of woodland and heath. Like the rest of Samsø, the coastline is characterized by steep cliffs and stony beaches, with some sandy beaches in between suited for bathing. Issehoved is Samsø's northernmost point and presents what have been described as a miniature of Skagens "Grenen". The small towns of Nordby, Mårup and Langør are situated on the North Island. Just north of Nordby is the world's biggest permanent labyrinth named 'Labyrinten', founded in the year 2000. It comprise a 60,000-square-metre (645,835-square-foot) patch of conifer woodland, grown on a previous christmas tree plantation. Northwest of Nordby, is the hill of Ballebjerg, Samsøs highest point, reaching 64 m. Near the village of Mårup is the harbour of Mårup Havn. In the summer months (17 June to 22 August) the old wooden freight-ship M/S Tunø, ferry passengers back and forth from here to the island of Tunø just west of Samsø, two days a week. Other two days of the week, the same boat is offering seal-safaris from Langør at Stavns Fjord.

=== Stavns Fjord ===
The shallow lagoon Stavns Fjord houses most of the smaller islands of Samsø municipality. The largest of them is Hjortholm and most of the rest are small islets, and have been named individually. The lagoon is separated from the sea of Kattegat by the 7 km long sandbar of Besser Rev. It is possible to walk on the reef all the way to the tip at low tide (ebb), except when the birds are breeding. A group of small islands (Kyholm, Lindholm, Rumpen, Vejrø) are located east of Stavns Fjord, in Kattegat.

=== South Island ===
The South Island is home to the seat of the mayor and Samsø's largest town Tranebjerg, but there are many other hamlets and villages (18 in all) spread across the countryside. The village of Ballen, lies on the east coast and is also home to the Samsø Energiakademi. Most of the land on the South Island is cultivated, but there are spots of nature like the forest Brattingsborg Skov and the cliffs, shrubs and beach meadows on the southcoast. Just south of the Kanhave canal is Samsø Airport.

== History ==
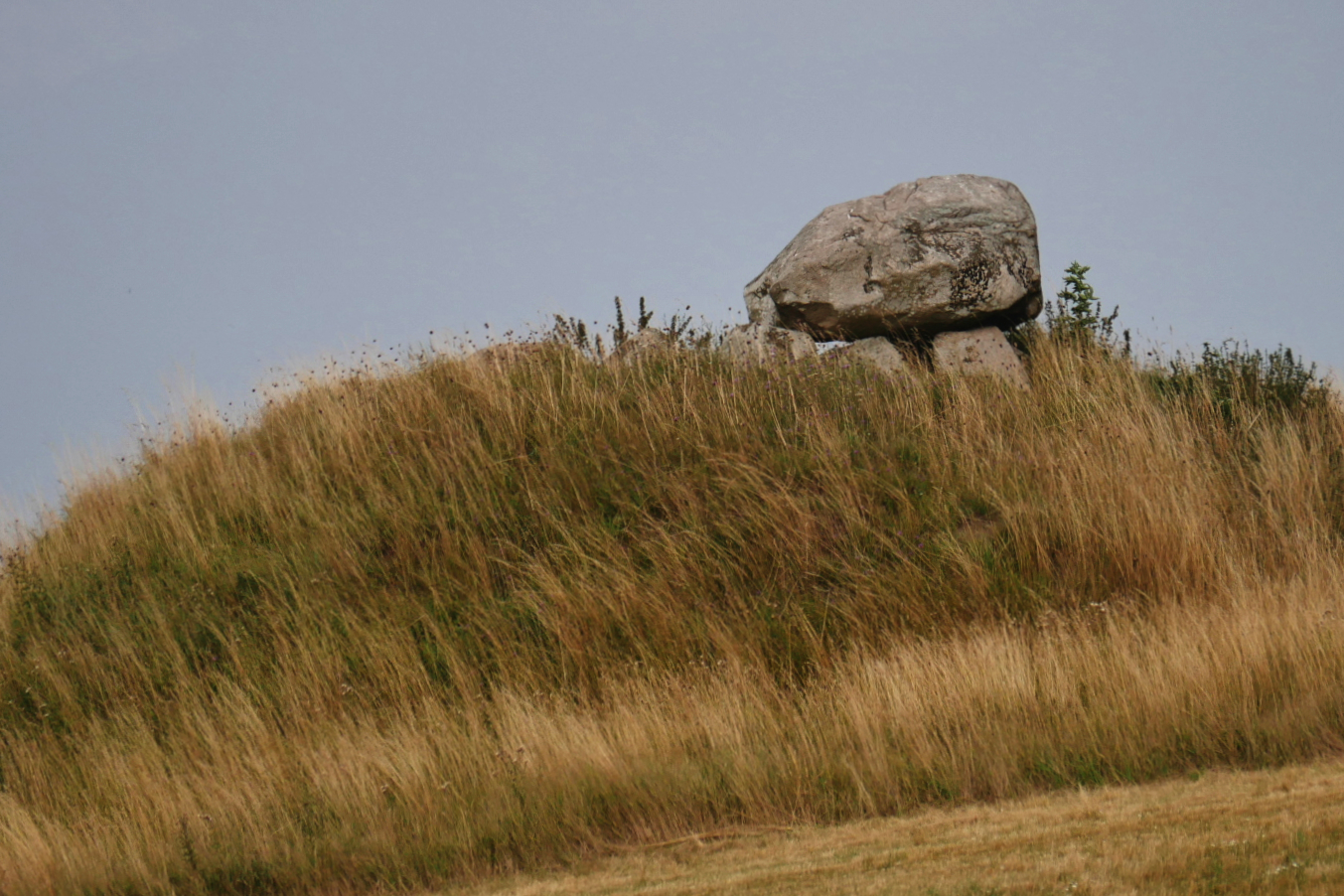
Ingeborg Hoy passage grave

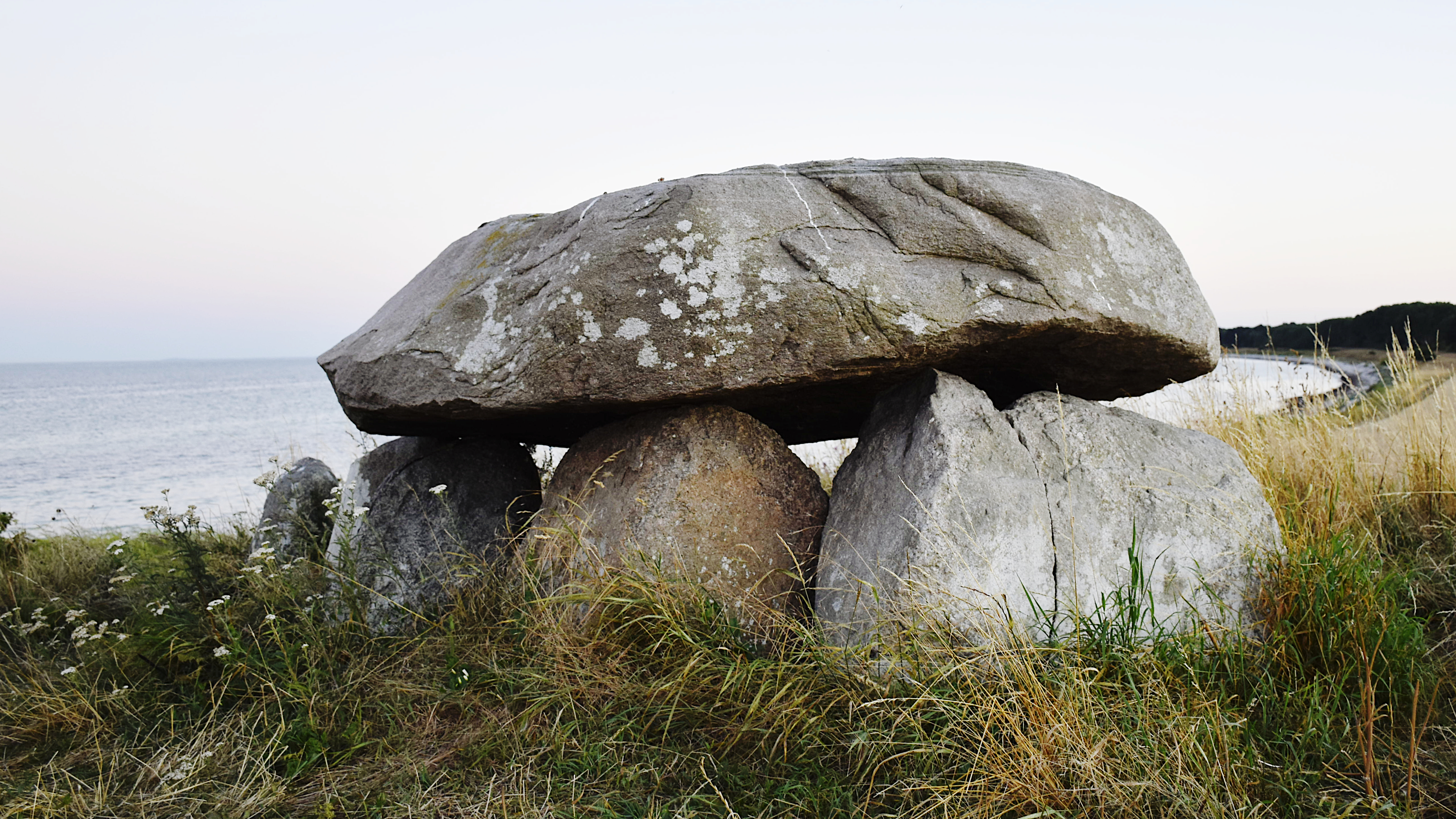
Ørby round barrow (aka Knøsen)

People have lived and hunted on Samsø since the ice receded at the end of the last Ice Age. Samsø first became an island approximately 9,000 years ago and there are several traces like dolmens, burial mounds, passage graves, kitchen middens, etc. from the Stone Age and Bronze Age cultures across the landscape. Excavations at Tønnesminde and Endebjerg, for example, show evidence of human habitation from the Stone Age through the Viking Age.

=== Norse mythology ===
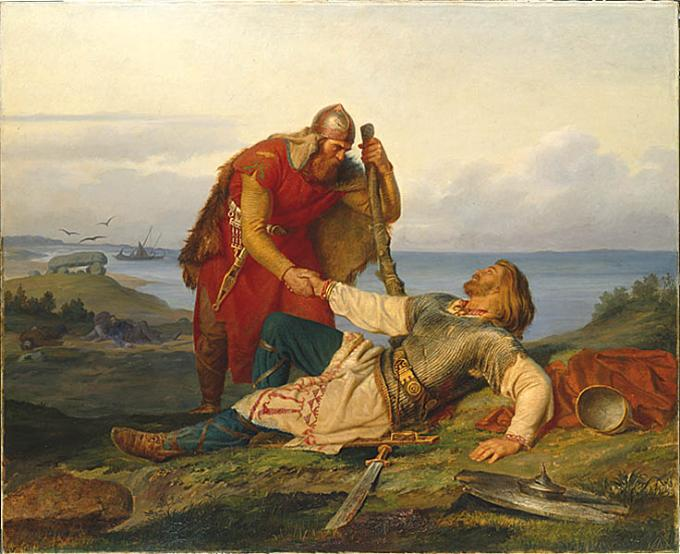
The Norwegian warrior Örvar-Oddr bids a last farewell to his blood brother, the Swedish warrior Hjalmar after the Battle of Samsø, by Mårten Eskil Winge (1866).

On this island, Saxo Grammaticus relates that there was a legendary battle, when the Swedish champion Hjalmar and his friend Orvar-Odd fought against the twelve sons of the Swedish berserker Arngrim. This battle was once famous, since it also figures in Faroese ballads, in Orvar-Odd's saga and in Hervarar saga.

According to the Hervarar saga and the Waking of Angantyr, the mounds of the slain berserkers were haunted. This did not stop Arngrim's granddaughter Hervor from approaching the mounds and demanding the enchanted sword Tyrfing from her father Angantyr.

"Samsey" (-ey being an earlier Norse form of -ø) is the island upon which Odin, under the name Jalk, learned Seid magic.

=== Kanhave canal ===
A canal was dug across the island at its narrowest place. The canal was about 500 m long and 11 m wide and could in its time be navigated by vessels with a draught of up to 1 m. It was dug and clad with wooden linings in the years 726–729 AD; the last part of the Scandinavian Iron Age. Kanhave canal is one of the largest known engineering projects of the Vikings and it is a sign of the centralized power of the time. Kanhave canal is thought of as instrumental to dominating the sea of Kattegat. There are plans to dig out the canal again.

=== Medieval fortresses ===
All known sources suggest that the island was the property of the Monarchy throughout medieval times, but it was an age of conflict and insecurity nevertheless, as a total of five fortresses were built on Samsø in the Middle Ages; Vesborg where the lighthouse is nowadays, Gammel Brattingsborg where the town of Tranebjerg is now, Hjortholm on the islet of the same name in the Stavns Fjord lagoon, Bisgård at the bishop's palace (official residence) in the parish of Onsbjerg and the small fortification of Blafferholm in the garden of Brattingsborg manor. None of them are left standing today. Only the castle hills and the archaeological excavations of the foundations remains. The National Museum of Denmark initiated thorough archaeological investigations of the fortification sites a few years ago and the field work terminated in 2012.

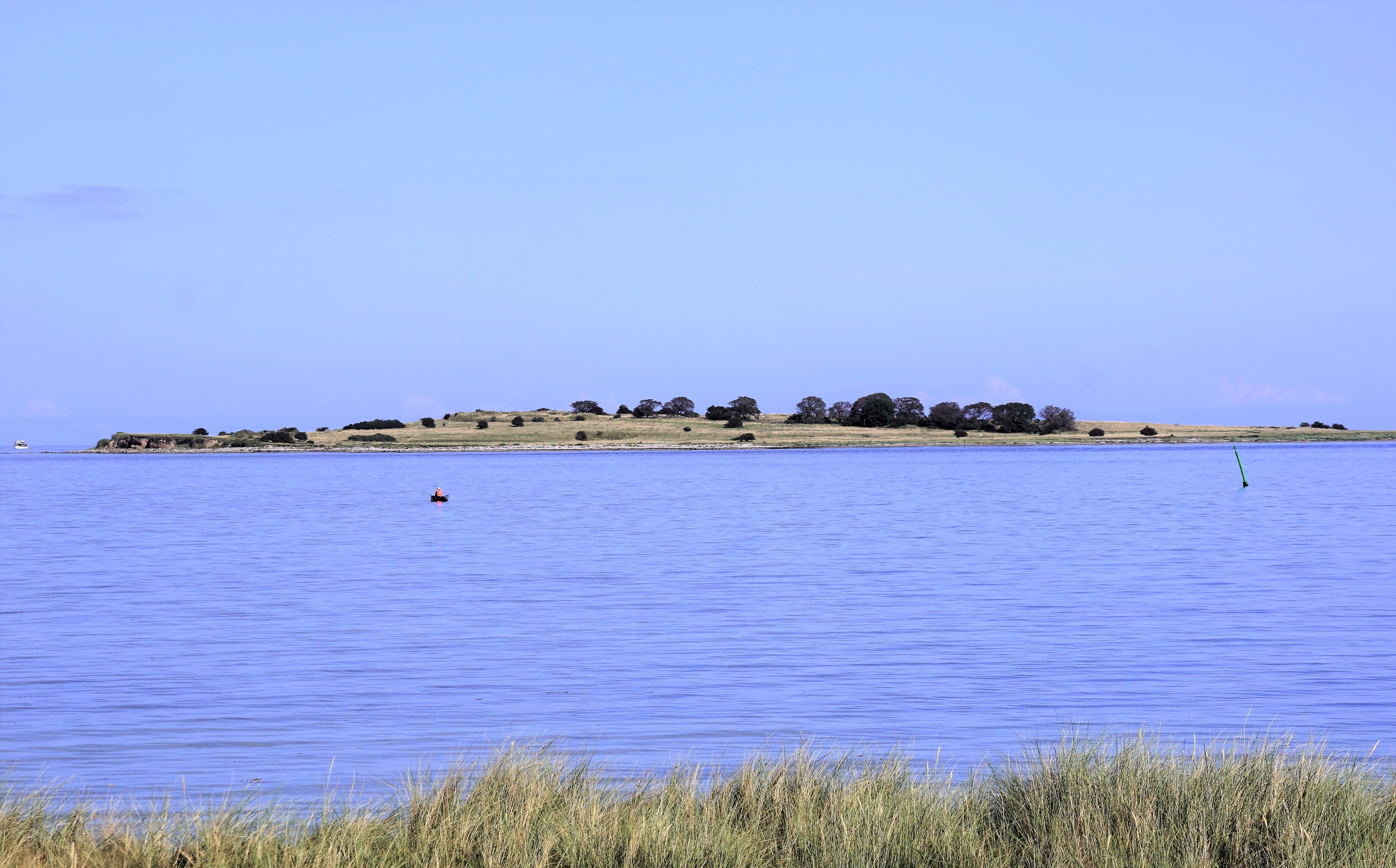
The island of Kyholm

=== The quarantine of Kyholm ===
From 1831 to 1857 there was a quarantine of plague and cholera sufferers on the tiny island of Kyholm just east of Samsø. Here, ships returning from long voyages had to dock, if they had disease on board. There is an abandoned cemetery of around 100 graves on the island. Kyholm is accessible year round, but it is advised not to be around when the birds are breeding.

=== German occupation ===
The strategic location of Samsø led it to become a Wehrmacht outpost during the German invasion of Denmark (1940). During this time, an American B-17 Flying Fortress safely crash-landed in Alstrup after being forced down by a German fighter. Navigator Carl Groesbeck was almost immediately captured by Germans but other members of the plane, including Co-Pilot Miles McCormack, were hidden by locals for some time until they too were eventually captured. All the crew members survived the ordeal and the war, except tail-gunner Douglas Farris who was killed in action while in the air.

== Agriculture and sustainable production ==
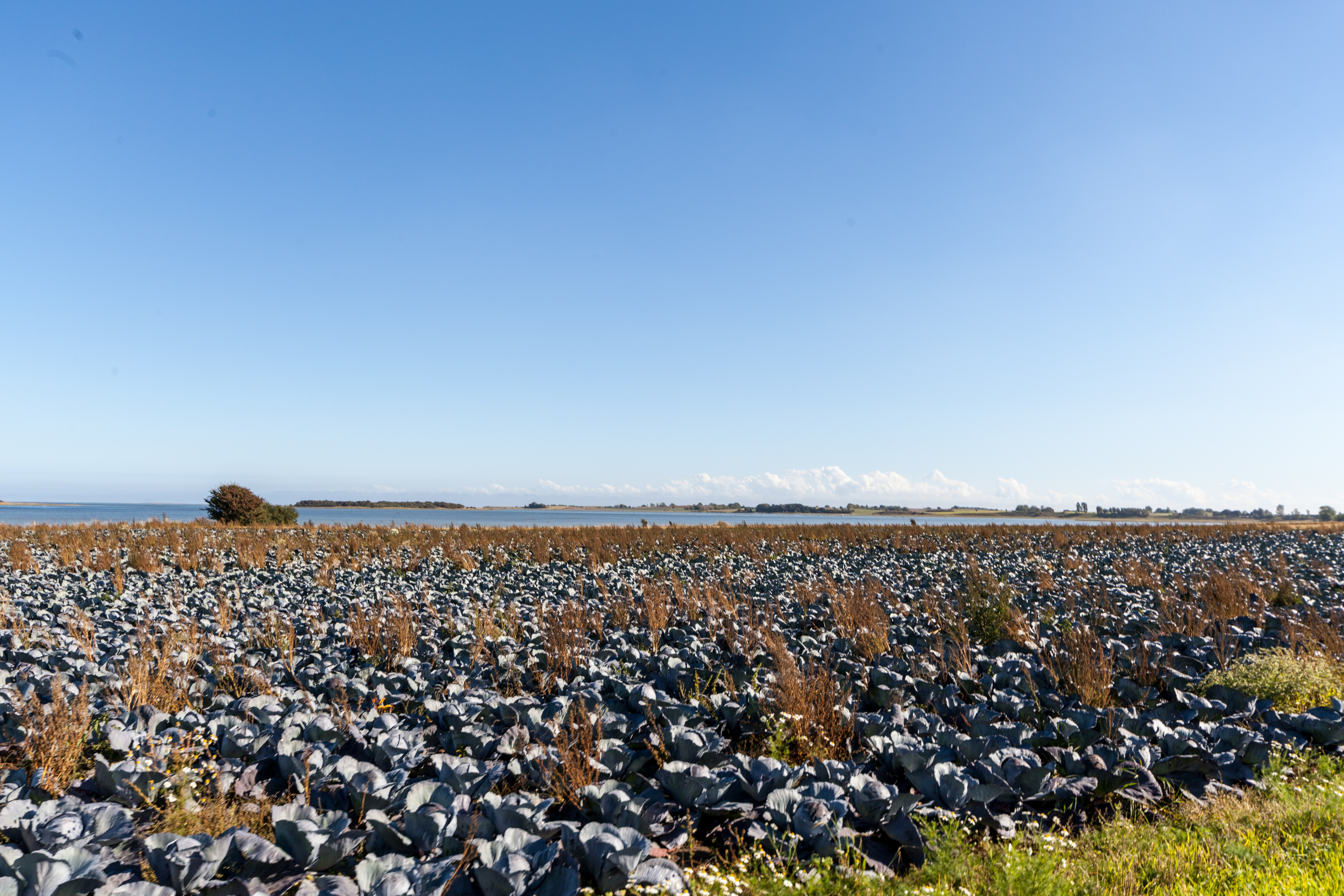
Agricultural field (cabbage) on Samsø

Agriculture has been the primary occupation on Samsø for millennia and nearly all of the island comprise cultured landscapes. Nowadays, farming is still an important business and the biggest contributor to the island's economy, but compared to the rest of Denmark, it has developed in its own direction. The agricultural produce comprise mostly potatoes, various other vegetables, berries, and some animal husbandry, with a significant share of free range farming. In the 2000s, especially the vegetable and berry production has increased, as the Samsø brand has become more widely known and popular. At the same time, packaging and industrial processing is increasingly taken care of on the island before shipping, again increasing the local revenue of the farming trade overall. Close to 16% of the islanders work in the farming (and fishing) sector, not including derived labour, compared to 3.5% countrywide.

In Denmark, Samsø is well known for its early harvest of new potatoes. The first few pounds of these potatoes usually fetch prices around £100, and are considered a great delicacy. Samsø is popular among French, Welsh and Irish people for strawberry picking during the months of June and July every year. Ecological agriculture and production is significant on Samsø, with a broad network of cooperating associations. It comprise farming of a large variety of vegetables, grains and fruits, livestock meat and products (lambs, sheep, yarn, cows, pigs, horses, donkeys, goats, chickens, eggs), a dairy, a brewery, restaurants and cafés, candy production, permaculture and forest garden experiments. There are several plans for extending the overall organic production and broaden the industry (a slaughterhouse, orangery, forest gardens and education), with a wish for creating more local jobs and opportunity for islanders.

== Renewable energy ==
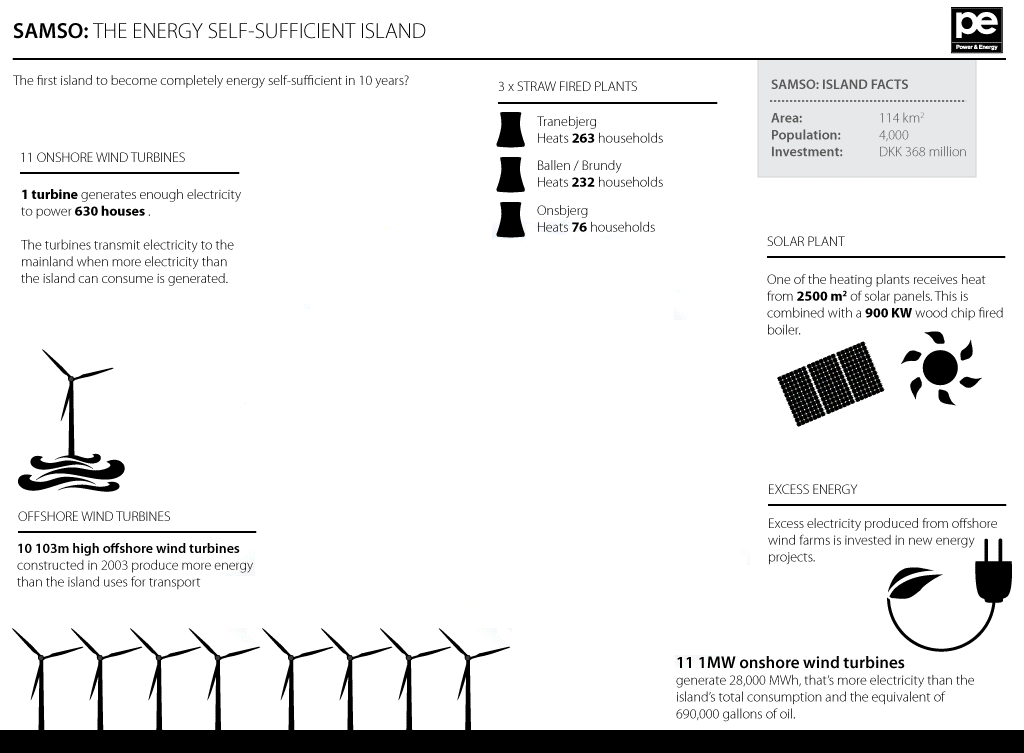
Renewable energy on Samsø

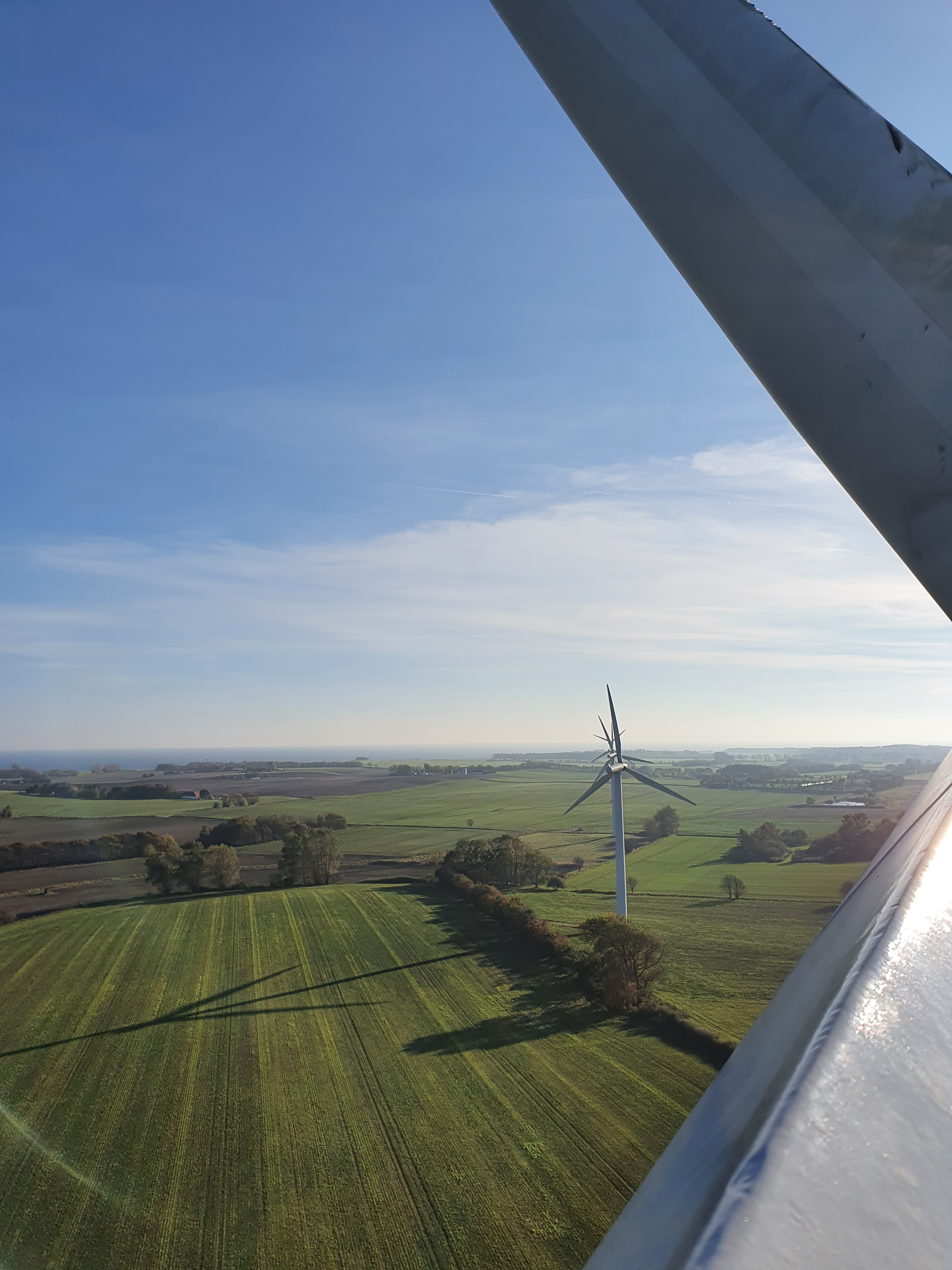
View from a 1 MW wind turbine on Samsø.

In 1997, Samsø won a government competition to become a model renewable energy community. At the time, Samsø was entirely dependent on oil and coal, both imported from the mainland. Therefore, Samsø became the world's first net renewable energy island.

Many different projects were started to realize the plan. An onshore wind farm comprising 11 turbines was built. The first turbine was erected and on-line in 2000. In addition, 10 offshore turbines (making a total of 30 MW from 21 turbines altogether including onshore turbines) were completed in 2003, funded by the islanders. Some of the farmers on Samsø heat their homes by straw burned in a central heating system, and they power some vehicles on biofuel which they also grow. The island has four district heating plants in total. An annual equivalent of 100% of the island's electricity comes from wind power, with surplus electricity exported to the mainland grid, and 75% of its heat comes from local solar power and biomass energy. An Energy Academy, the Samsø Energiakademi, has opened in the town of Ballen. It is a community hall for energy concerns and a meeting place for energy and local development. The academy is currently working towards making Samsø 100% fossil fuel free by 2030, which is 20 years earlier than the national goal.

== Notable people ==
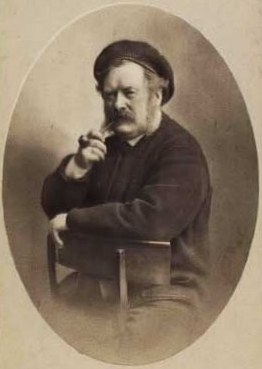
Carl Frederik Sørensen, before 1879

- Tyge (d. 1272) Bishop of the Diocese of Aarhus 1261–1272; died on Samsø
- Ulrik Christian Gyldenløve, Count of Samsø (1678–1719), a Danish navy admiral and Governor of Iceland; acknowledged illegitimate son of King Christian V of Denmark and his royal mistress Sophie Amalie Moth
- Carl Frederik Sørensen (1818–1879), born in Besser, Samsø, Danish artist who specialized in marine painting
- Lotte Glob (born 1944 in Samsø), a Danish ceramic artist living in the north of Scotland, the daughter of Peter Glob
- Anne Marie Løn (born 1947), novelist
- Nicolas Michaux (born 1984), Belgian singer and songwriter, part time resident of Samsø
- Kristine Raahauge (1949–2022), Greenlandic municipal politician, activist, eskimologist and writer who was resident of and died on Samsø

== Gallery ==
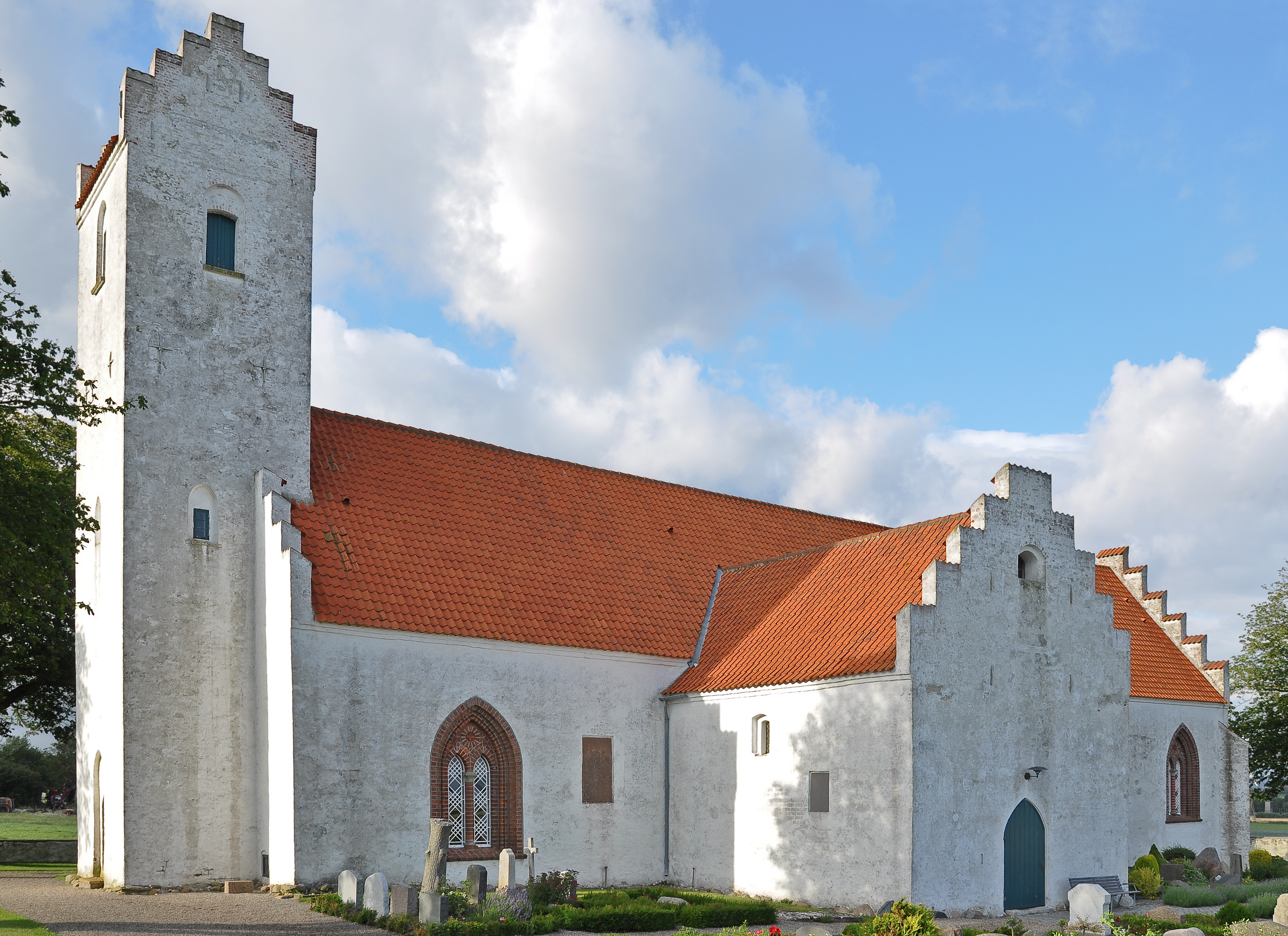
Nordby Church.

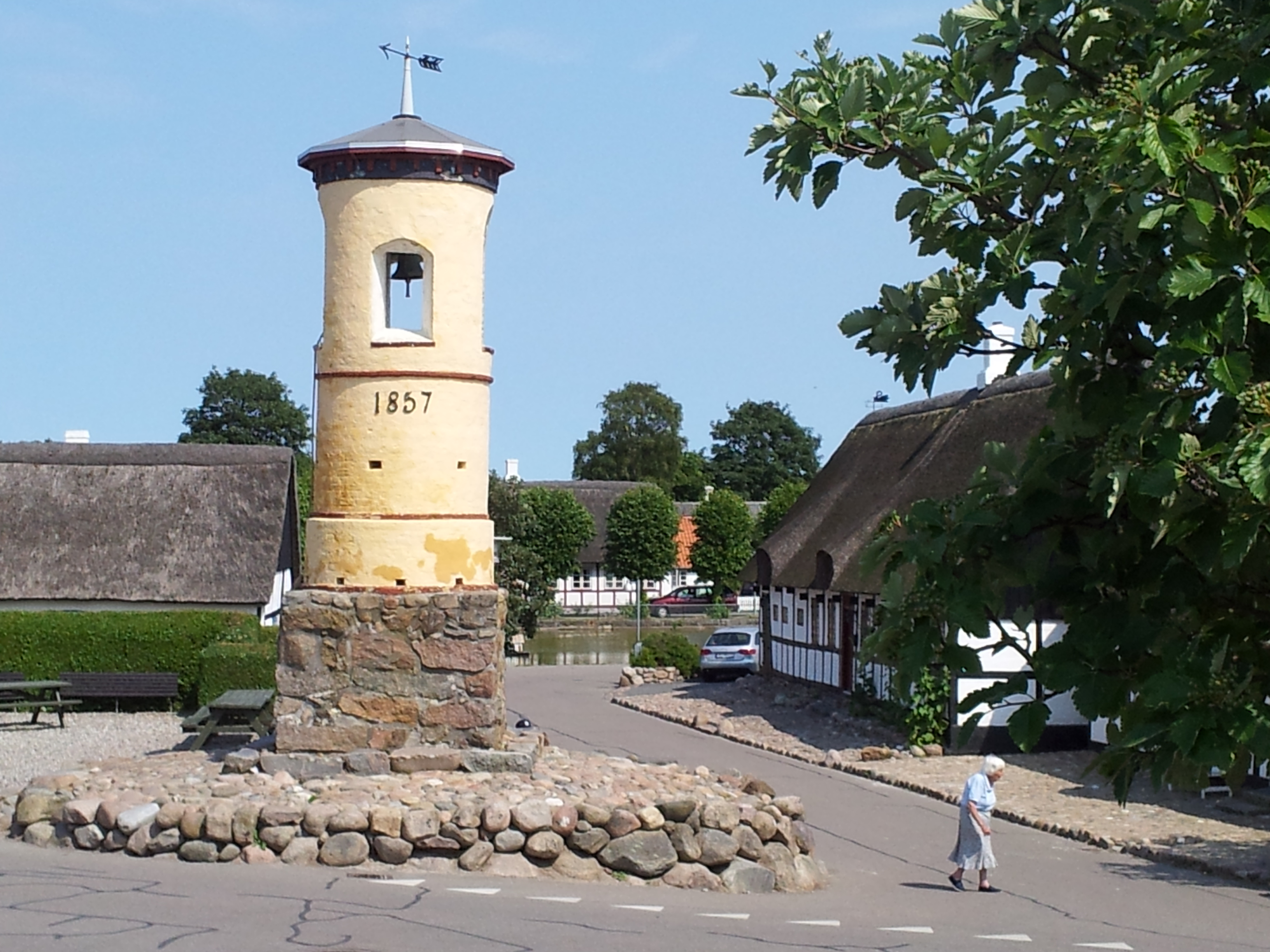
The village bell in Nordby

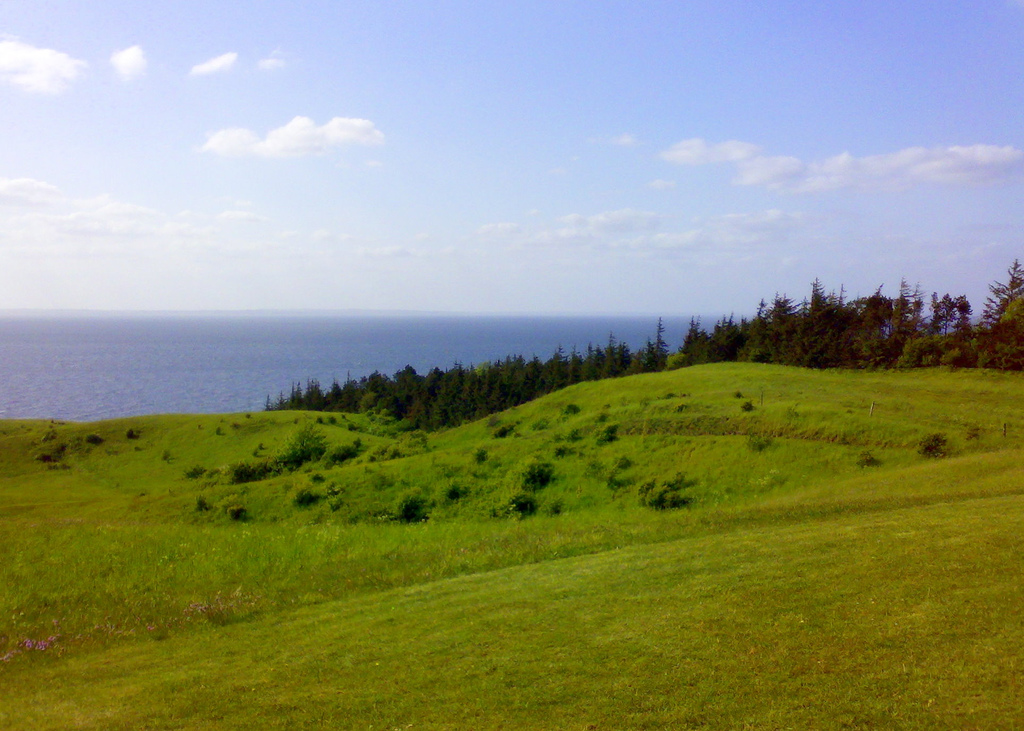
Ballebjerg (Nordby Bakker), the highest point on Samsø.

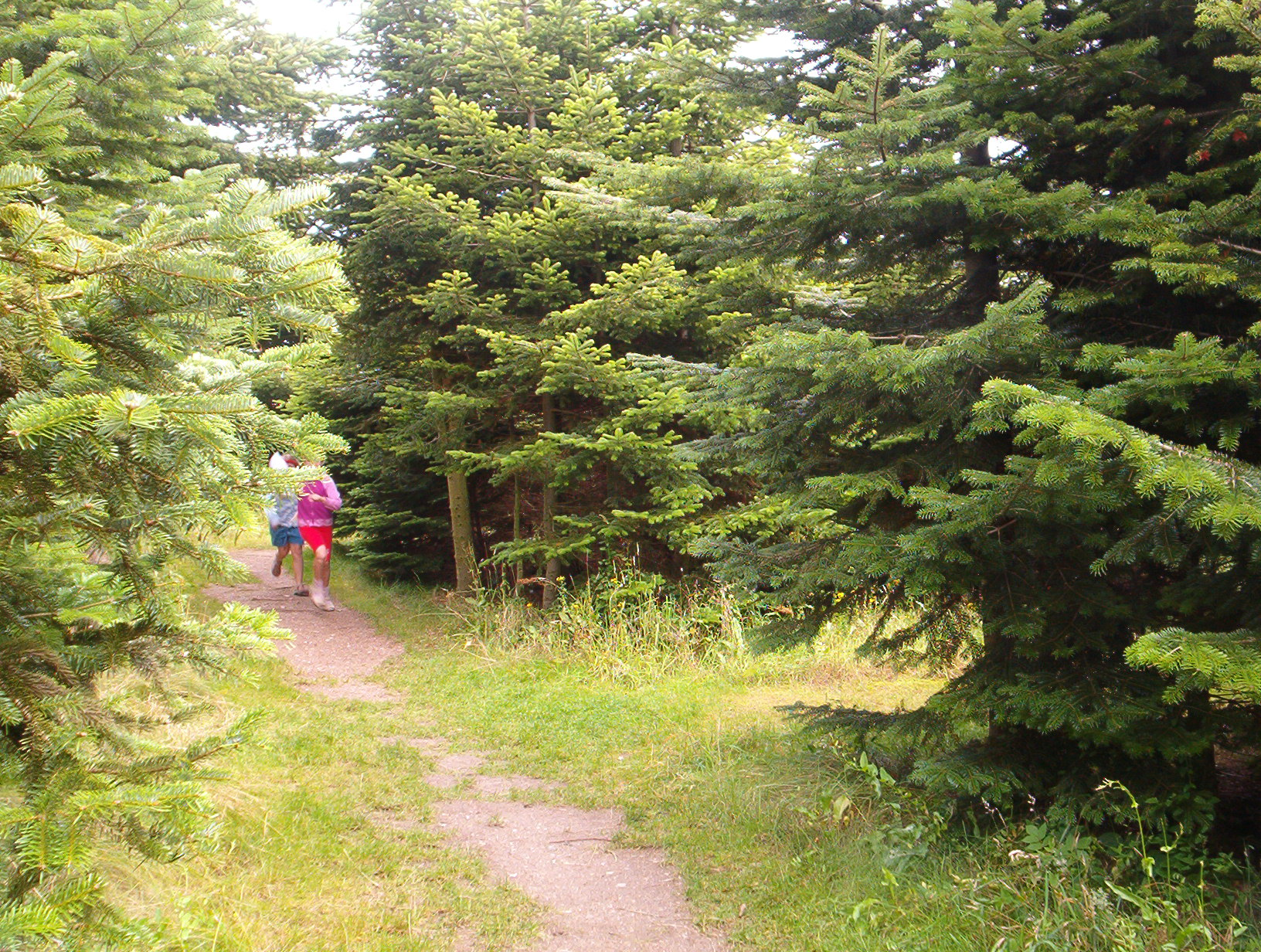
Inside Labyrinten, the largest permanent maze in the world.

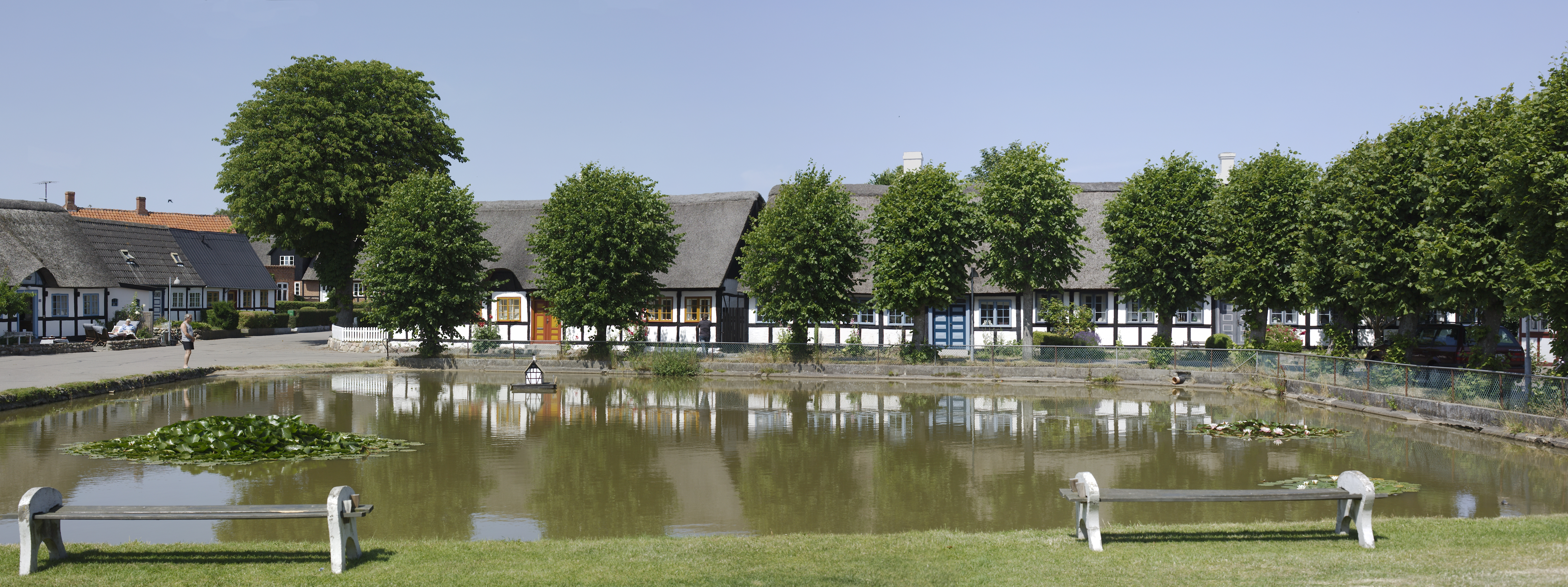
Village pond in Nordby

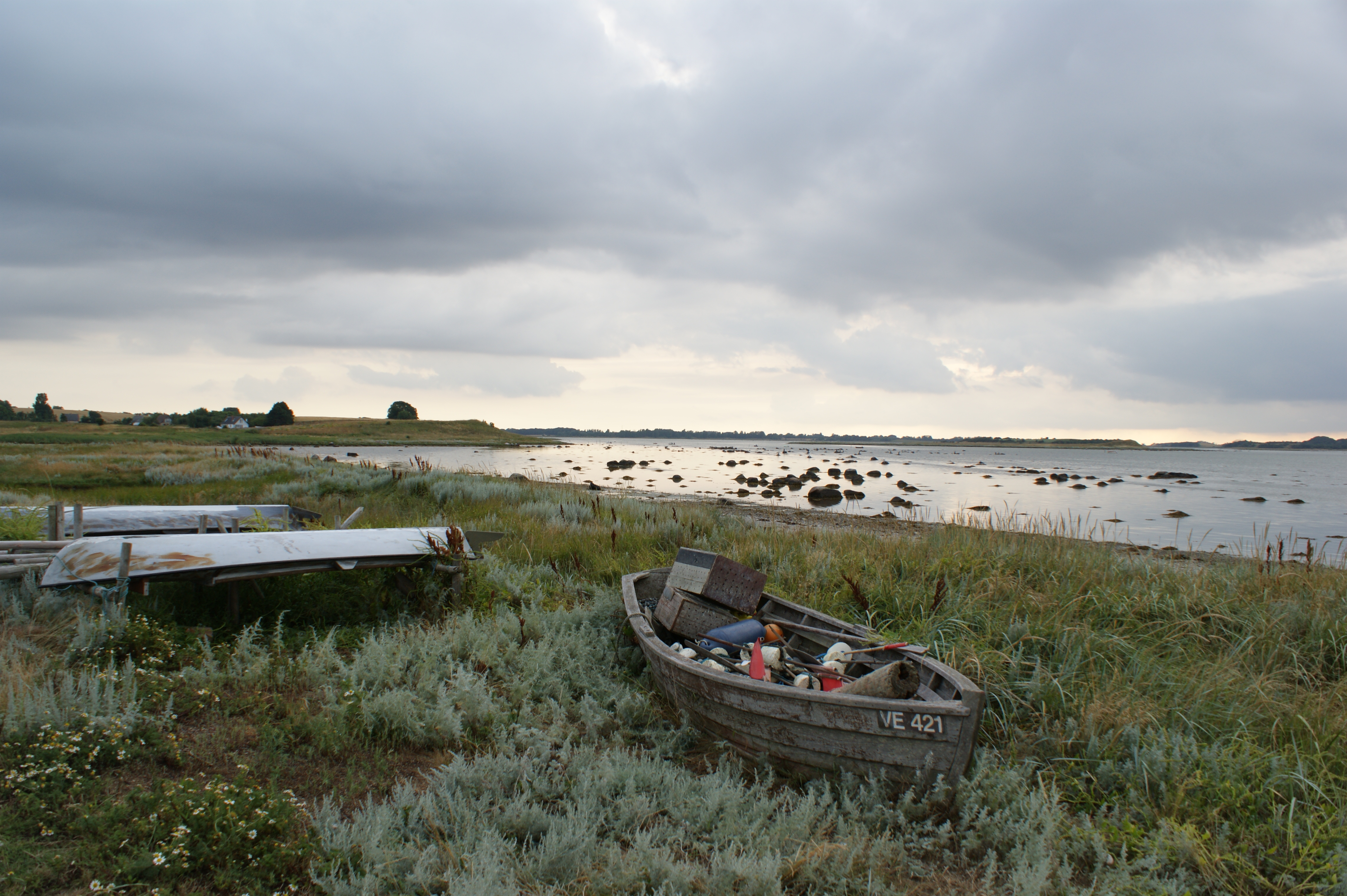
Stavns Fjord

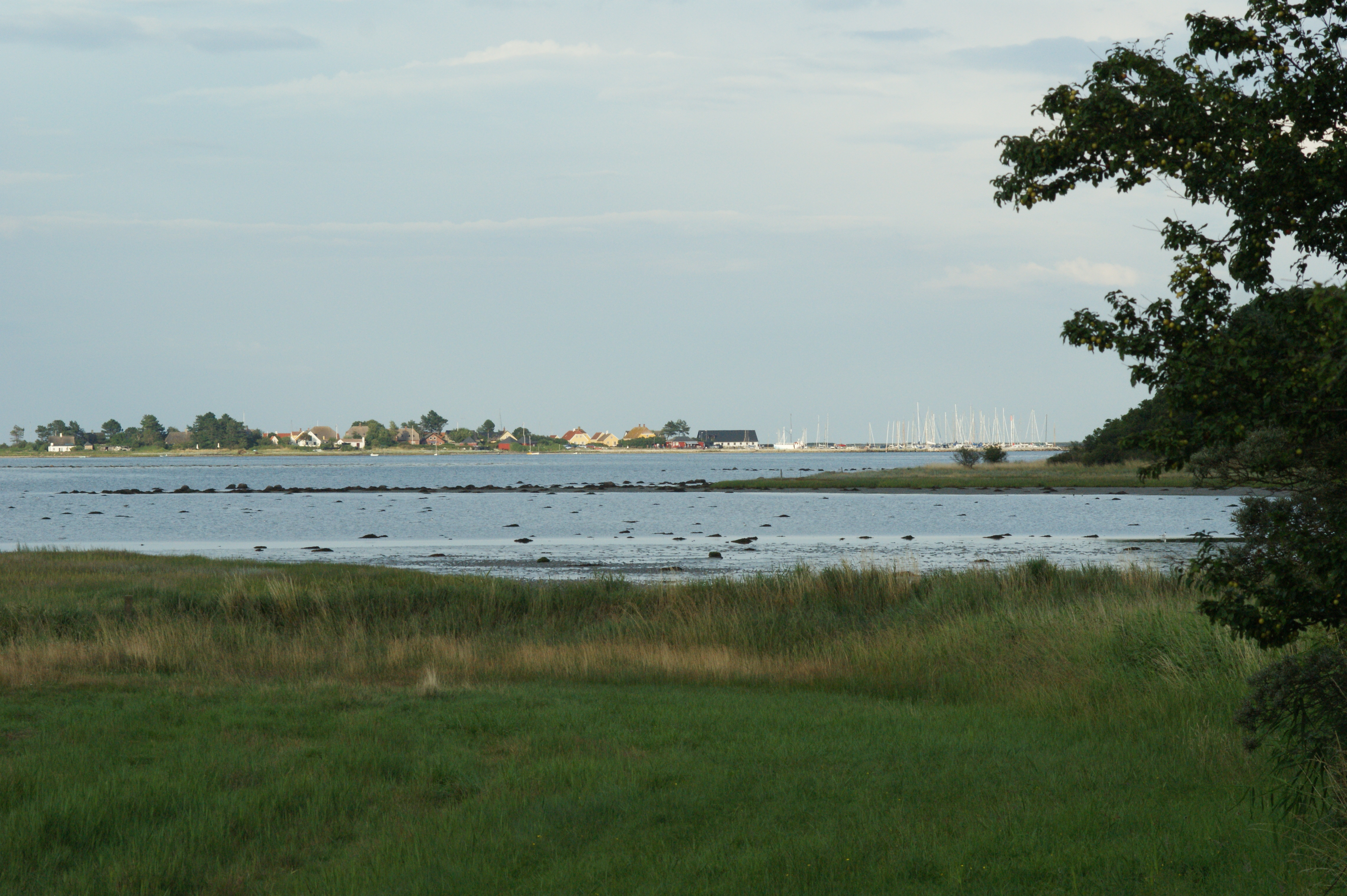
Langør across Stavns Fjord

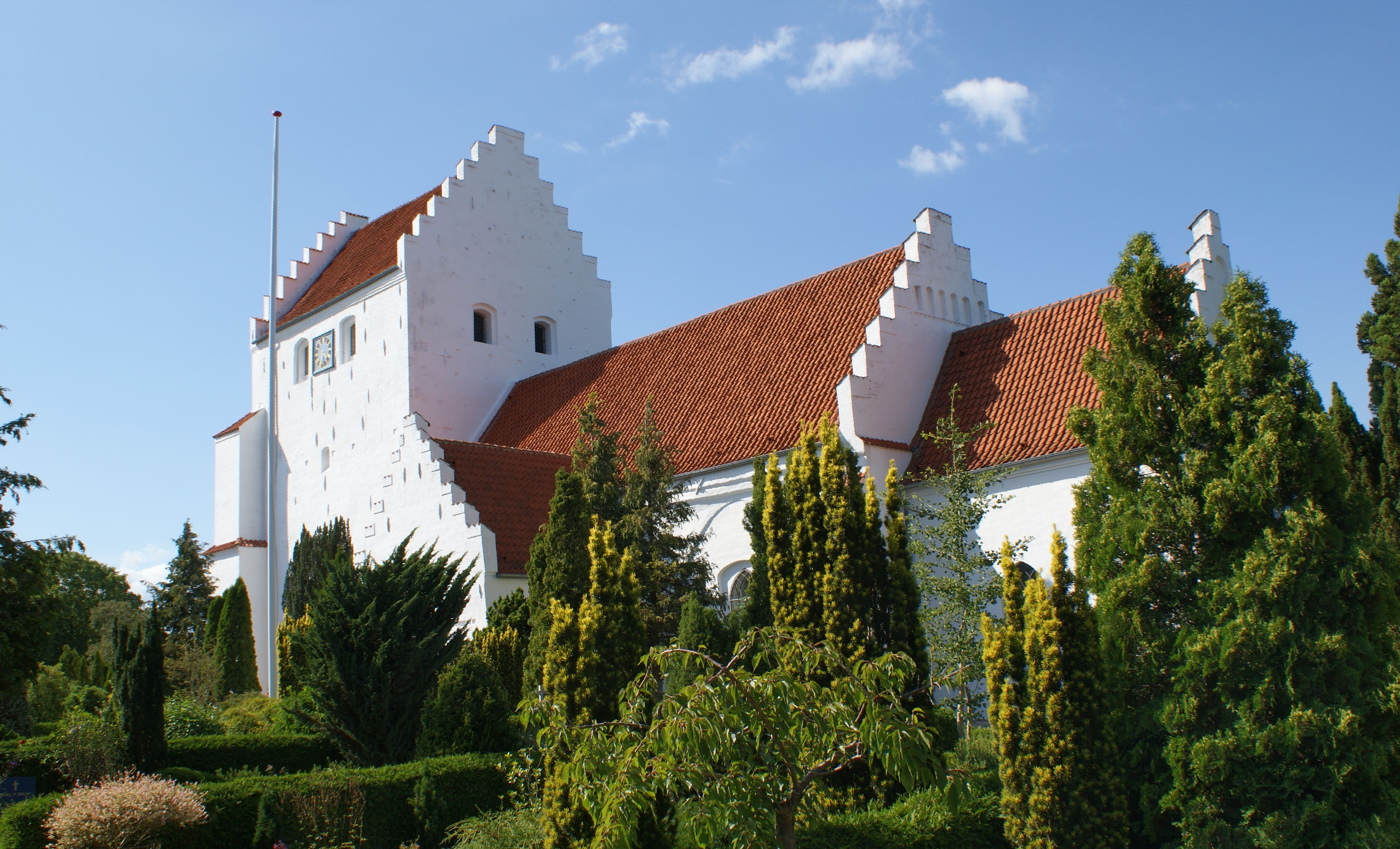
Tranebjerg church

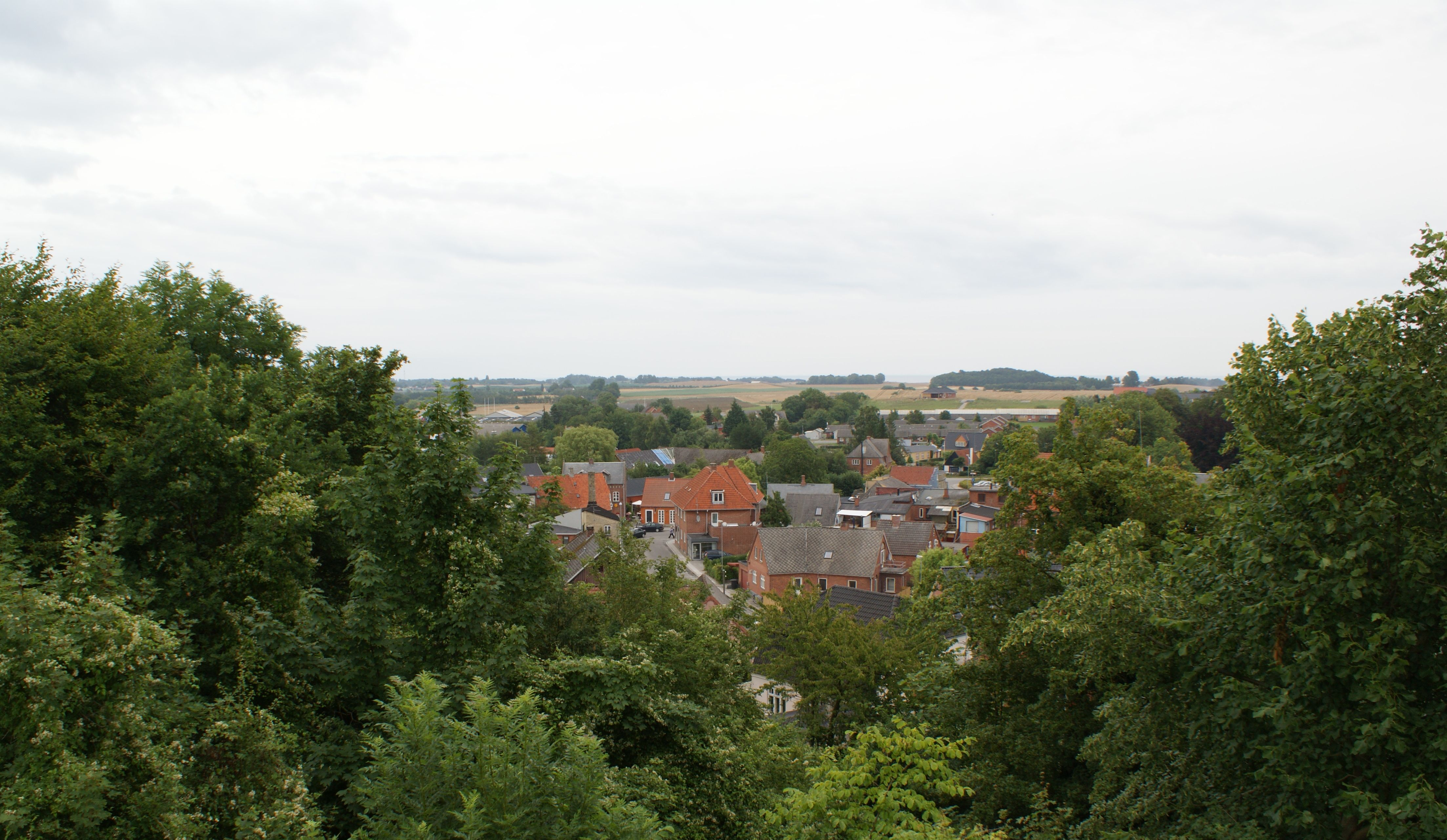
Tranebjerg

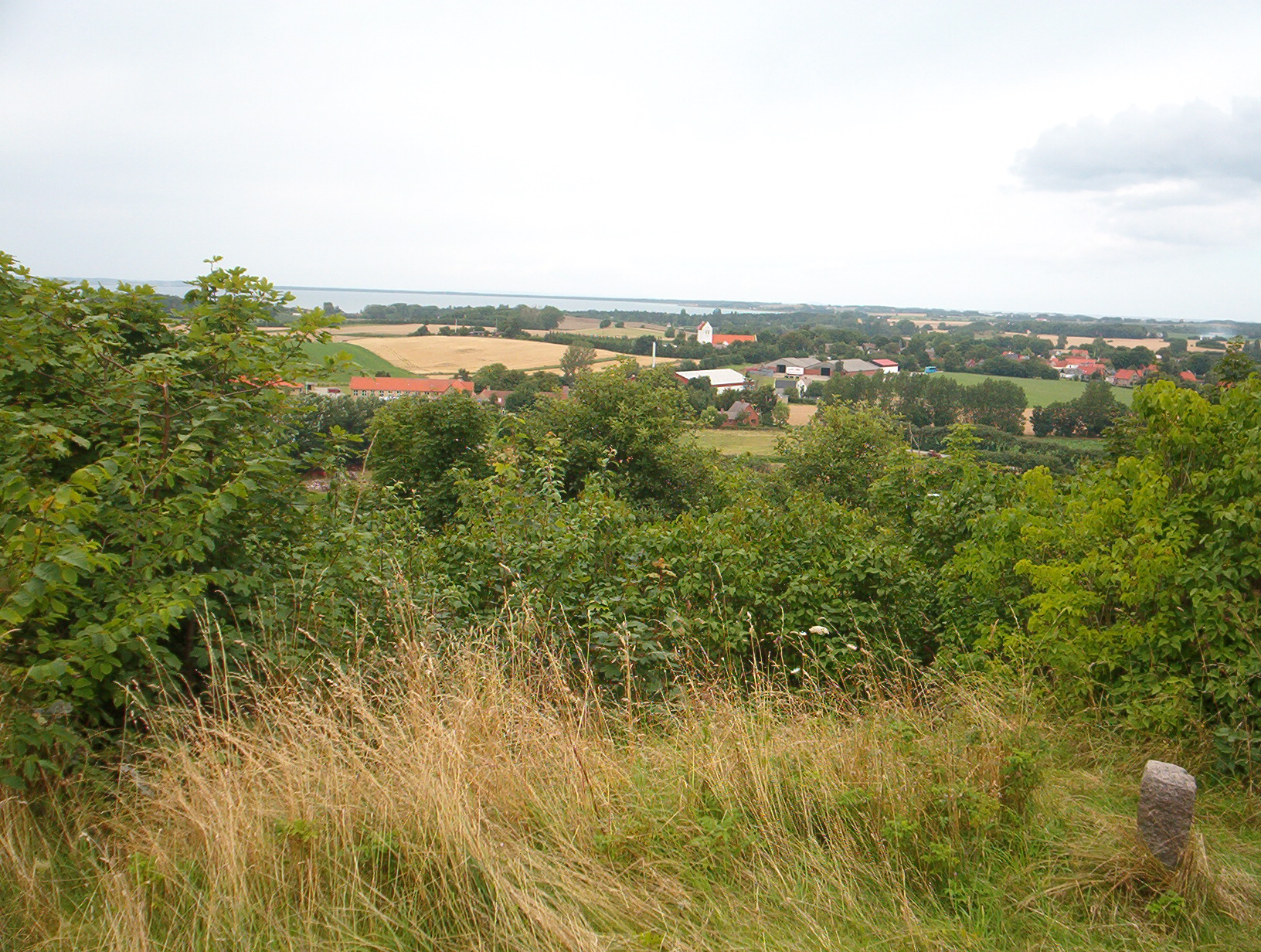
View from Dyret, the highest hill on the South Island.

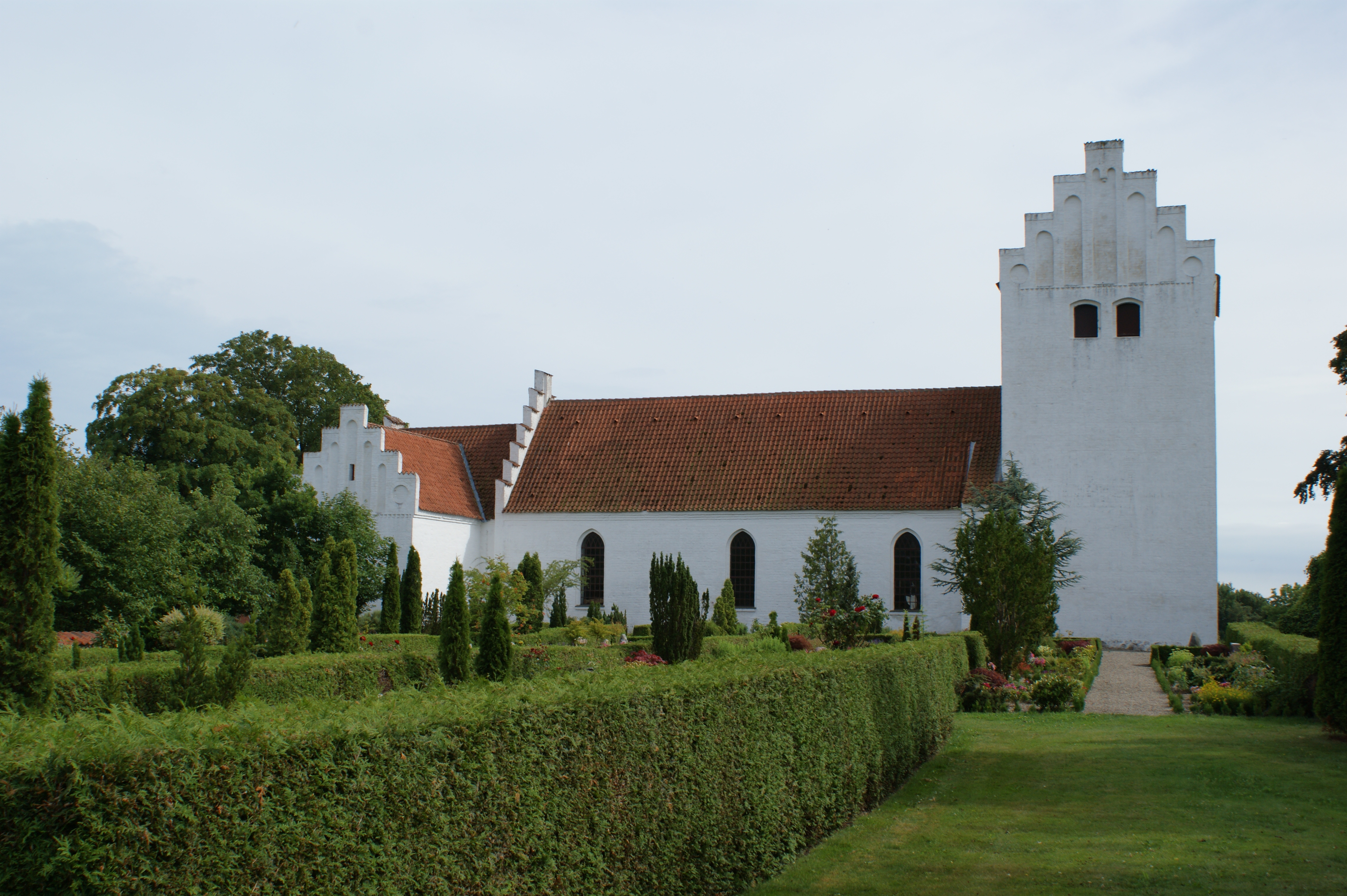
Kolby church

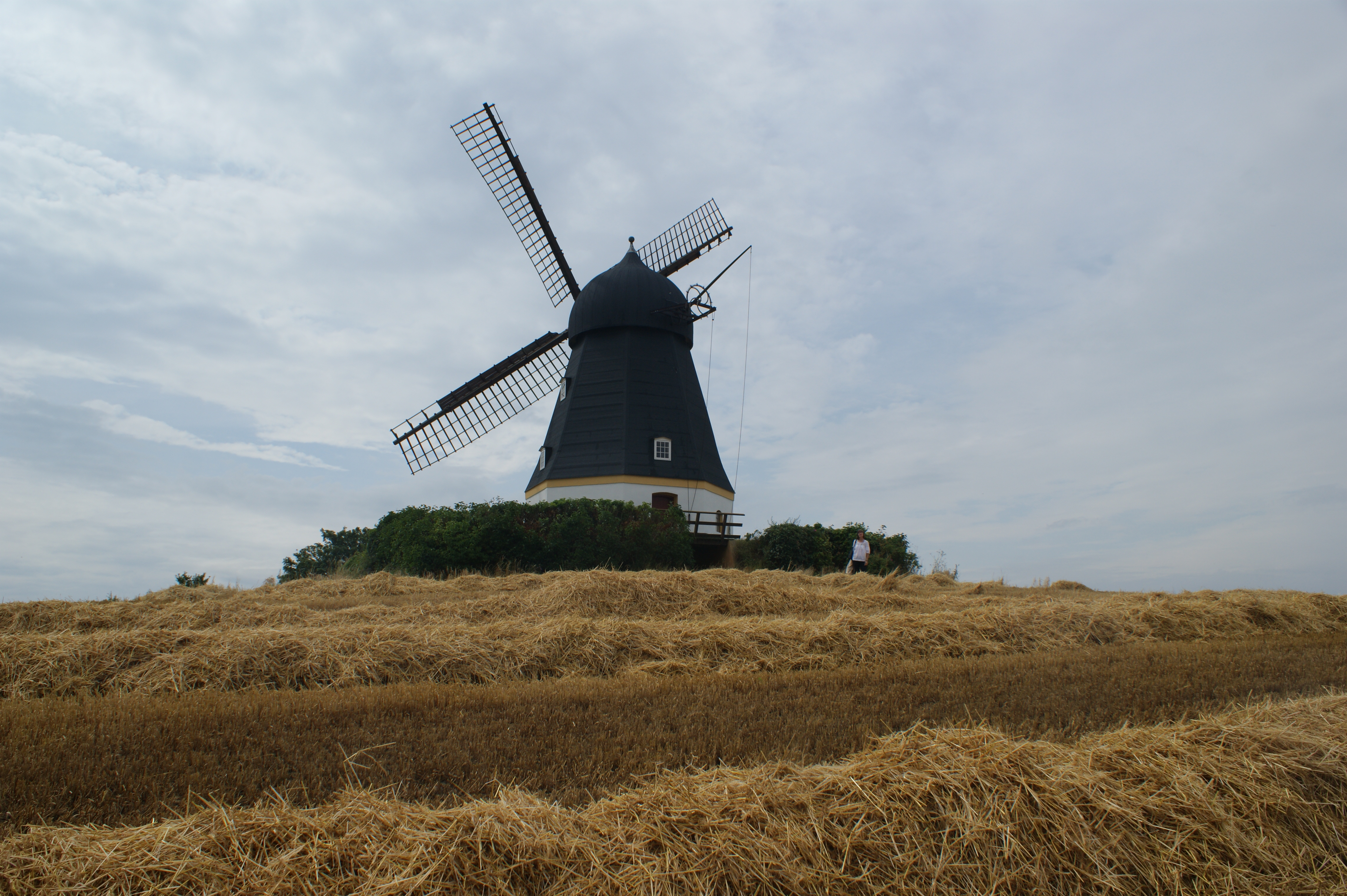
Kolby grain mill (Museum Samsø)

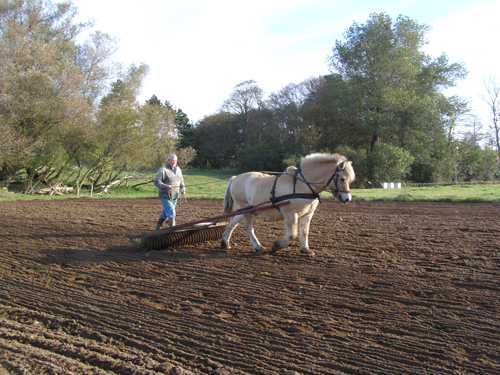
Museum Fredensdal

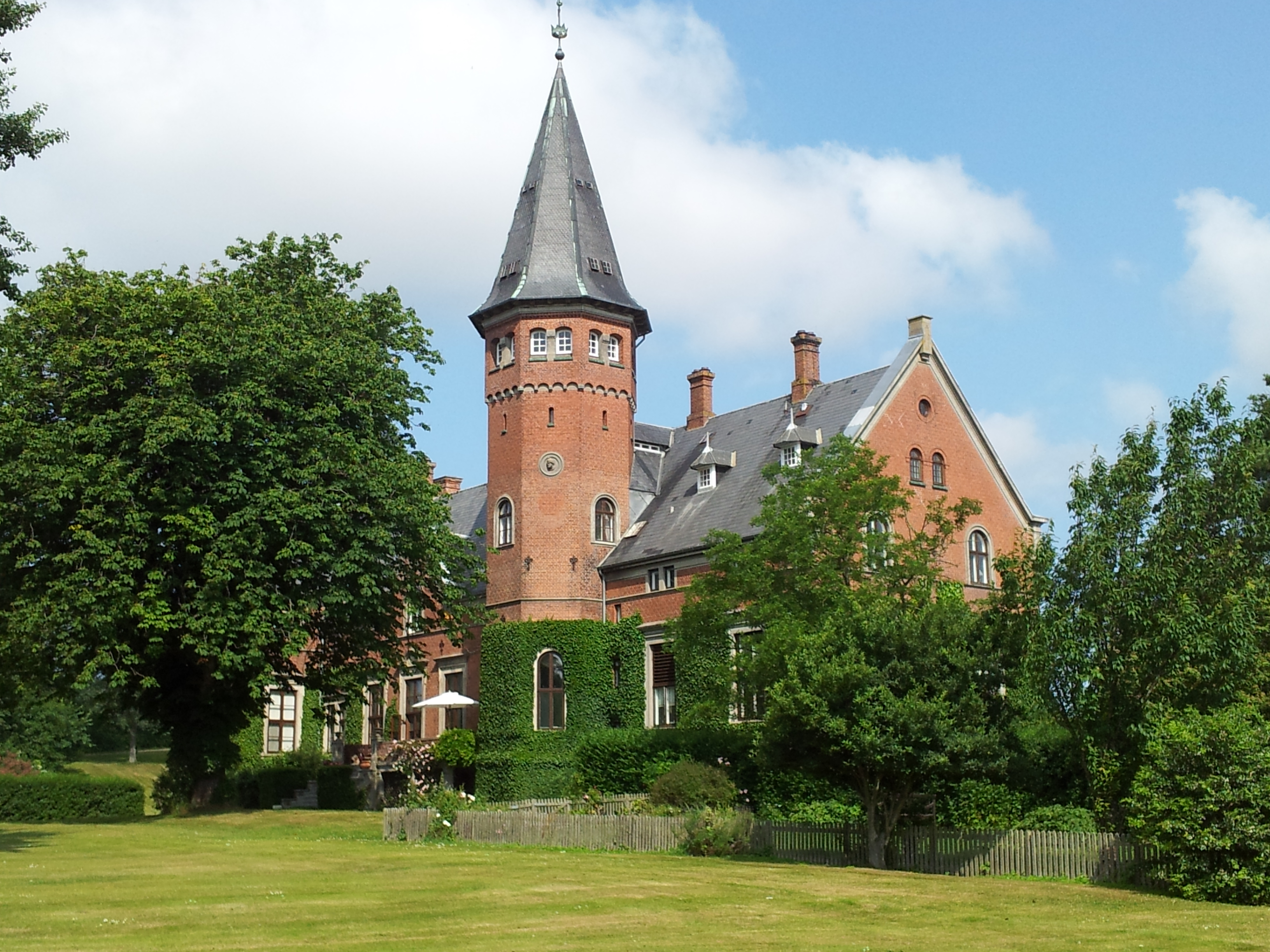
Brattingsborg Manor

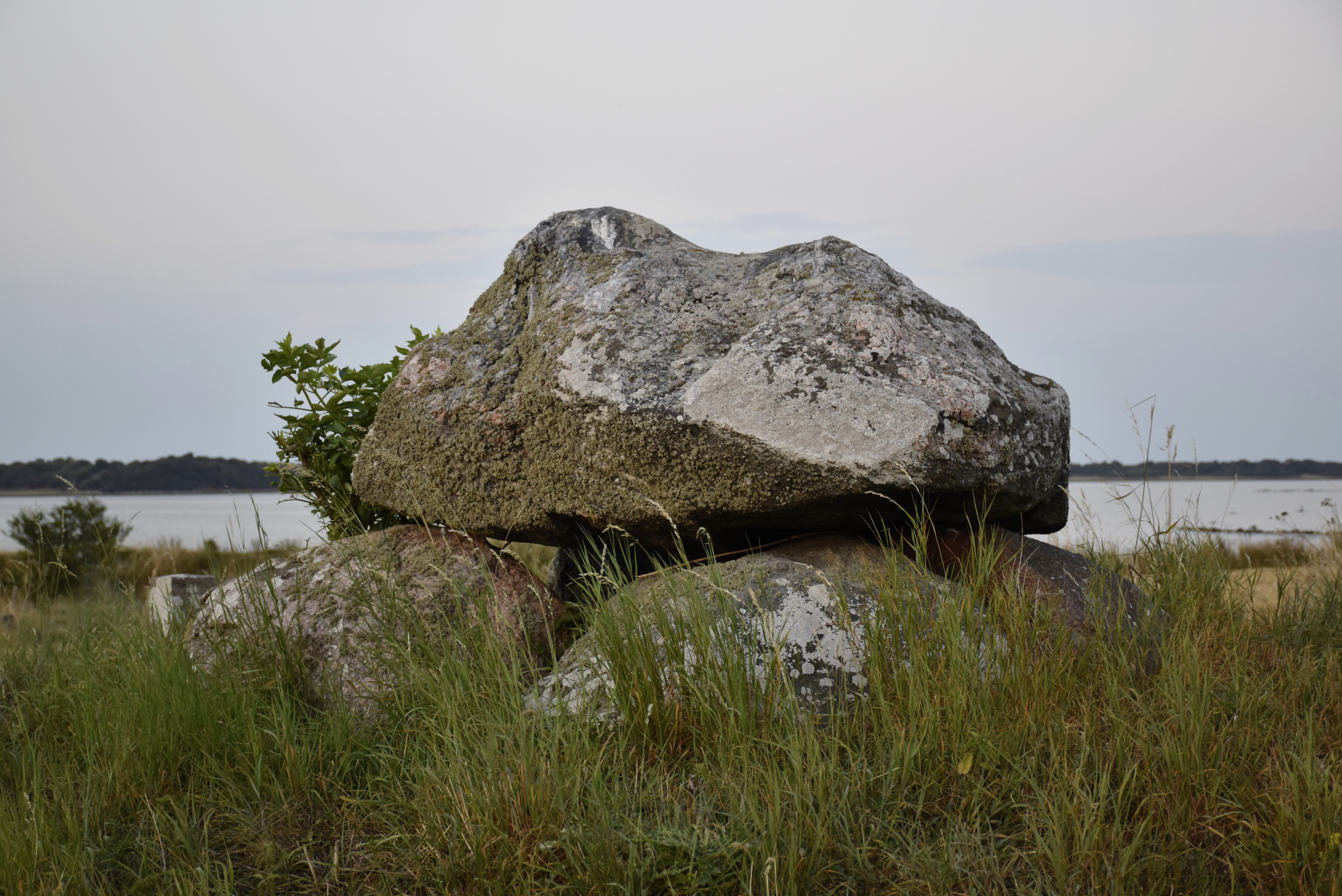
Alstrup passage grave

== See also ==
- List of islands of Denmark
- Samsø cheese
