= Tranebjerg =

- Town
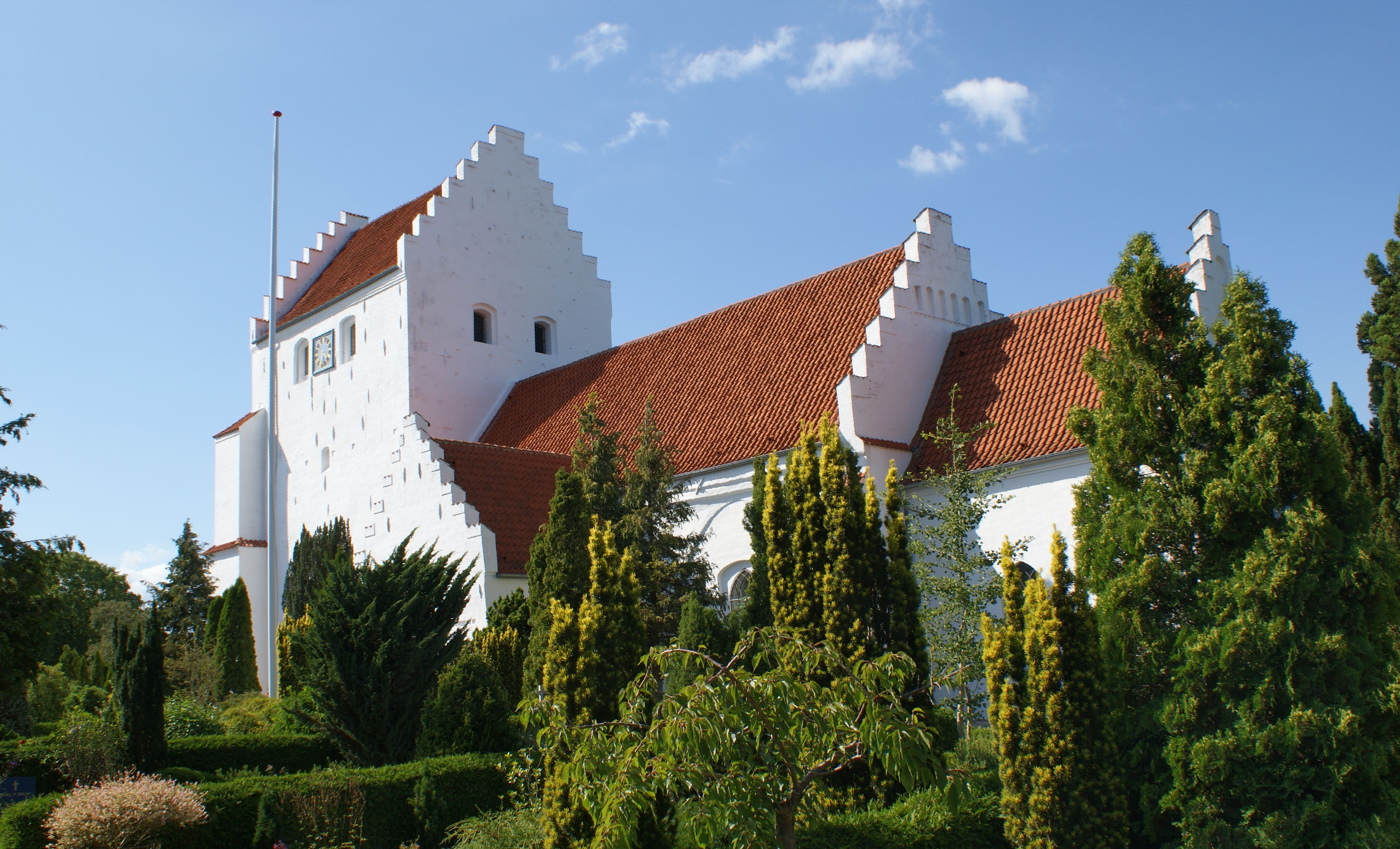
- Tranebjerg Church

- Location in the Central Denmark Region
- Coordinates: 55°50′N 10°36′E
- Country: Denmark
- Region: Central Denmark
- Municipality: Samsø

Population (2026)
  - Total: 832
- Time zone: UTC+1 (CET)
  - Summer (DST): UTC+2 (CEST)

Tranebjerg is a town, situated at the south central part of the island of Samsø in Denmark. It is the largest town on Samsø and also the municipal seat of Samsø Municipality.

Tranebjerg is an old town, with a big village church from the 14th century and was once home to Brattingsborg Castle, a royal castle that burned down in the year 1289. Of the more modern facilities the town is home to a tourist office and an Ecomuseum. At the Ecomuseum, restored old buildings like an active oldfashioned smallholding, a skipper-farmhouse, a blacksmith and a grain mill amongst others, exposes the connection between Samsø's landscape, culture and inhabitants through the ages which includes an exhibition of the islands Stone Age past, traced to about 9.000 BC.

== History ==
Tranebjerg is first mentioned in 1424 as Tranberg, but has been inhabited long before that. Tranebjerg was the location of a castle, Brattingsborg Castle, in the 1100s-1200s. The castle was burned down by Stig Andersen Hvide in 1289, and not discovered again until 2008 where the castle's church was discovered.

== Tranebjerg Church ==
Tranebjerg Church is located in Tranebjerg and was built in the late 1300s. The church has several embrasures, which indicate that the church has had a defensive role in the town. The altarpiece is from 1615. The church went through a significant restoration between 1866 and 1869, where all windows in the church was also replaced. There are two organs in the church, one from 1954 built in Kongens Lyngby, the other from 1909 and built in Horsens. A model ship from 1850 to 1851 hang in the church. It is a model of the ship of the line Christian VIII which was blown up in 1849 during the Battle of Eckernförde. It was donated in 1851 by local merchant Jens Peter Gylling and his wife Gjertrud Gylling. The church's turret clock is from the middle of the 1800s and made by A.H. Funch. Another turret clock from 1500s or 1600s was built in Eastern Jutland, and later donated to Samsø Museum after suffering severe rust. There are two bells in the church, one from 1400 to 1425 by Nicolaus Eskilii, the other from 1654 by Jørgen Hansen.

== Climate ==
Climate data for Tranebjerg (1981–2010)
Month	Jan	Feb	Mar	Apr	May	Jun	Jul	Aug	Sep	Oct	Nov	Dec	Year
Mean daily maximum °C (°F)	3.3 (37.9)	3.1 (37.6)	5.6 (42.1)	10.4 (50.7)	15.2 (59.4)	18.3 (64.9)	21.1 (70.0)	20.9 (69.6)	16.8 (62.2)	12.1 (53.8)	7.5 (45.5)	4.4 (39.9)	11.6 (52.9)
Daily mean °C (°F)	1.7 (35.1)	1.4 (34.5)	3.1 (37.6)	7.0 (44.6)	11.5 (52.7)	14.5 (58.1)	17.0 (62.6)	17.1 (62.8)	13.8 (56.8)	9.9 (49.8)	5.8 (42.4)	2.8 (37.0)	8.8 (47.8)
Mean daily minimum °C (°F)	−0.2 (31.6)	−0.4 (31.3)	1.0 (33.8)	4.0 (39.2)	8.1 (46.6)	11.0 (51.8)	13.4 (56.1)	13.8 (56.8)	11.3 (52.3)	7.7 (45.9)	3.9 (39.0)	1.0 (33.8)	6.2 (43.2)
Average precipitation mm (inches)	41.8 (1.65)	30.8 (1.21)	37.7 (1.48)	31.2 (1.23)	40.8 (1.61)	58.5 (2.30)	54.8 (2.16)	56.9 (2.24)	54.6 (2.15)	55.3 (2.18)	45.9 (1.81)	44.5 (1.75)	552.6 (21.76)
Source: DMI

== Notable residents ==
- Anne Marie Løn (born 1947), writer
- Anni Bisso (born 1969), sport shooter
