= 2025 Horsens municipal election =

Municipal election in Denmark

← 2021	18 November 2025	2029 →

All 27 seats to the Horsens municipal council 14 seats needed for a majority
- Turnout: 49,630 (64.6%) ▲0.8%
	First party	Second party	Third party
	A	V	O
Party	Social Democrats	Venstre	Danish People's Party
Last election	12 seats, 38.5%	7 seats, 24.0%	1 seat, 5.0%
Seats won	12	5	2
Seat change	0	▼2	▲1
Popular vote	19,638	8,043	3,818
Percentage	40.3%	16.5%	7.8%
Swing	▲1.8%	▼7.5%	▲2.9%
	Fourth party	Fifth party	Sixth party
	F	C	I
Party	Green Left	Conservatives	Liberal Alliance
Last election	1 seat, 5.5%	3 seats, 10.1%	0 seats, 3.1%
Seats won	2	2	2
Seat change	▲1	▼1	▲2
Popular vote	3,618	3,557	3,321
Percentage	7.4%	7.3%	6.8%
Swing	▲1.9%	▼2.8%	▲3.7%
	Seventh party	Eighth party	Ninth party
	Ø	Æ	B
Party	Red-Green Alliance	Denmark Democrats	Social Liberals
Last election	1 seat, 5.7%	Did not stand	1 seat, 3.6%
Seats won	1	1	0
Seat change	0	▲1	▼1
Popular vote	2,619	1,933	1,386
Percentage	5.4%	4.0%	2.8%
Swing	▼0.3%	New	▼0.7%
Mayor before election
Peter Sørensen
Social Democrats
Mayor after election
Peter Sørensen
Social Democrats

The 2025 Horsens Municipal election was held on November 18, 2025, to elect the 27 members to sit in the regional council for the Horsens Municipal council, in the period of 2026 to 2029. Peter Sørensen from the Social Democrats, would secure re-election.

== Background ==
Following the 2021 election, Peter Sørensen from Social Democrats became mayor for his third term. He would run for a fourth term.

== Electoral system ==
For elections to Danish municipalities, a number varying from 9 to 31 are chosen to be elected to the municipal council. The seats are then allocated using the D'Hondt method and a closed list proportional representation. Horsens Municipality had 27 seats in 2025.

== Electoral alliances ==
=== Electoral Alliance 1 ===
Party		Political alignment
A	Social Democrats	Centre-left
B	Social Liberals	Centre to Centre-left
F	Green Left	Centre-left to Left-wing
Ø	Red-Green Alliance	Left-wing to Far-Left

=== Electoral Alliance 2 ===
Party		Political alignment
C	Conservatives	Centre-right
D	New Right	Far-right
I	Liberal Alliance	Centre-right to Right-wing

=== Electoral Alliance 3 ===
Party		Political alignment
M	Moderates	Centre to Centre-right
V	Venstre	Centre-right
Æ	Denmark Democrats	Right-wing to Far-right

== Results by polling station ==
Division	A	B	C	D	F	I	L	M	O	T	V	Æ	Ø
Division	%	%	%	%	%	%	%	%	%	%	%	%	%
Sønderbro	47.5	1.8	5.2	0.3	8.6	5.0	0.5	0.6	10.9	0.1	7.9	3.3	8.4
Vesthallen	46.0	2.6	5.8	0.3	7.6	5.3	0.3	0.3	10.6	0.2	9.0	2.8	9.2
Midtbyen	38.7	3.9	8.0	0.3	8.0	8.4	0.4	0.9	8.2	0.2	12.9	3.2	6.8
Endelave	59.1	1.8	2.7	0.9	6.4	3.6	0.0	0.9	5.5	0.0	3.6	4.5	10.9
Forum	41.7	3.2	5.7	0.6	10.2	6.0	0.9	0.4	9.6	0.3	11.1	2.8	7.6
Dagnæs	46.7	2.4	6.1	0.4	7.1	6.0	0.2	0.5	8.6	0.1	13.9	3.9	3.9
Torsted	41.7	2.0	7.5	0.2	9.9	7.4	0.1	0.4	8.4	0.4	14.2	4.3	3.5
Hatting	39.7	2.3	8.0	0.1	8.3	9.8	0.3	0.5	7.0	0.3	17.1	4.1	2.4
Lund	44.6	2.3	9.6	0.2	5.4	7.1	0.5	0.7	7.0	0.2	14.8	3.6	4.1
Egebjerghallen	43.9	3.3	9.0	0.3	6.4	6.7	0.2	0.6	9.1	0.3	12.5	2.9	4.8
Stensballe	32.9	4.7	13.8	0.1	6.1	13.6	0.4	0.5	5.3	0.0	17.2	2.5	2.9
Højvangen	38.7	3.2	8.3	0.2	7.5	7.0	0.3	0.8	5.5	0.0	19.7	4.0	4.8
Brædstrup	32.7	1.1	4.8	0.3	4.3	3.1	0.4	0.9	5.5	0.1	37.9	6.2	2.9
Nim	18.6	6.0	5.8	0.2	5.8	5.0	0.8	2.2	7.0	0.0	36.8	7.7	4.1
Sdr.Vissing	24.0	3.7	4.3	0.0	13.0	4.6	1.2	1.7	8.1	0.2	25.6	7.8	6.0
Østbirk	36.3	2.3	4.5	1.1	6.4	4.0	0.5	0.5	6.7	0.2	28.3	5.7	3.6
Gedved	42.5	2.3	7.4	0.5	7.5	4.1	0.2	0.6	6.2	0.0	19.5	3.5	5.7
Hovedgård	44.8	1.7	5.4	0.9	5.0	7.0	0.2	0.9	7.7	0.1	13.6	4.5	8.2
Søvind	30.6	3.5	7.5	0.6	9.7	5.8	0.7	1.1	7.5	0.1	18.9	7.9	6.2
Tønning-Træden	26.7	2.6	6.8	0.2	13.3	4.0	0.2	8.0	4.0	0.2	23.2	5.4	5.4
Sundparken	50.9	2.8	2.6	0.2	6.9	3.6	0.6	0.5	8.1	0.6	6.2	1.8	15.2
Sejet	31.2	2.8	11.2	0.7	5.6	8.1	1.1	0.7	16.8	0.4	10.5	7.0	3.9

== Results ==
Party		Votes	%	+/-	Seats	+/-
Horsens Municipality
A	Social Democrats	19,638	40.30	+1.76	12	0
V	Venstre	8,043	16.50	-7.54	5	-2
O	Danish People's Party	3,818	7.83	+2.86	2	+1
F	Green Left	3,618	7.42	+1.90	2	+1
C	Conservatives	3,557	7.30	-2.79	2	-1
I	Liberal Alliance	3,321	6.81	+3.74	2	+2
Ø	Red-Green Alliance	2,619	5.37	-0.30	1	0
Æ	Denmark Democrats	1,933	3.97	New	1	New
B	Social Liberals	1,386	2.84	-0.71	0	-1
M	Moderates	356	0.73	New	0	New
L	Miljølisten Horsens	192	0.39	New	0	New
D	New Right	171	0.35	-2.86	0	-1
T	Søren Astrup	82	0.17	New	0	New
Total		48,734	100	N/A	27	N/A
Invalid votes		141	0.18	-0.14		
Blank votes		755	0.98	+0.32		
Turnout		49,630	64.61	+0.78		
Source: valg.dk

== Opinion polls ==
Polling firm	Fieldwork date	Sample size	A	V	C	Ø	F	O	B	D	I	L	M	T	Æ	Others	Lead
Epinion	4 Sep - 13 Oct 2025	449	38.7	14.5	5.5	5.0	9.7	8.4	3.0	–	6.7	–	1.3	–	6.4	0.8	24.2
2024 european parliament election	9 Jun 2024		17.2	15.0	10.2	4.9	14.4	7.9	5.9	–	7.7	–	6.4	–	8.0	–	2.2
2022 general election	1 Nov 2022		30.8	13.3	4.9	3.5	6.5	2.7	2.8	4.3	10.0	–	9.2	–	9.0	–	17.5
2021 regional election	16 Nov 2021		37.2	22.0	10.6	5.9	5.5	5.2	3.9	4.0	2.1	–	–	–	–	–	15.2
2021 municipal election	16 Nov 2021		38.5 (12)	24.0 (7)	10.1 (3)	5.7 (1)	5.5 (1)	5.0 (1)	3.6 (1)	3.2 (1)	3.1 (0)	–	–	–	–	–	14.5
