= 2021 Horsens municipal election =

← 2017	16 November 2021	2025 →

All 27 seats to the Horsens Municipal Council 14 seats needed for a majority
- Turnout: 47,094 (63.8%) ▼4.7pp
	First party	Second party	Third party
	A	V	C
Party	Social Democrats	Venstre	Conservatives
Last election	13 seats, 43.2%	7 seats, 23.0%	1 seat, 4.1%
Seats won	12	7	3
Seat change	▼1	0	▲2
Popular vote	17,846	11,135	4,673
Percentage	38.5%	24.0%	10.1%
Swing	▼4.7%	▲1.0%	▲6.0%
	Fourth party	Fifth party	Sixth party
	Ø	F	O
Party	Red–Green Alliance	Green Left	Danish People's Party
Last election	1 seat, 4.7%	1 seat, 3.9%	3 seats, 10.8%
Seats won	1	1	1
Seat change	0	0	▼2
Popular vote	2,629	2,559	2,305
Percentage	5.7%	5.5%	5.0%
Swing	▲1.0%	▲1.6%	▼5.8%
	Seventh party	Eighth party	Ninth party
	B	D	I
Party	Social Liberals	New Right	Liberal Alliance
Last election	0 seats, 2.2%	0 seats, 0.8%	1 seat, 4.8%
Seats won	1	1	0
Seat change	▲1.0	▲1	▼1
Popular vote	1,647	1,488	1,422
Percentage	3.6%	3.2%	3.1%
Swing	▲1.4%	▲2.4%	▼1.7%
Mayor before election
Peter Sørensen
Social Democrats
Mayor after election
Peter Sørensen
Social Democrats

Despite tending to vote for parties in the blue bloc for Danish general elections, Horsens Municipality have only had mayors from the Social Democrats since the 2007 municipal reform.

In the 2017 election, the Social Democrats had come one seat short of an absolute majority, but managed to win the mayor's position nonetheless.

In this election Peter Sørensen from the Social Democrats was seeking his third term. The result would see the Social Democrats once again becoming largest, despite them losing a seat and decreasing their vote share by 4.7%. The final agreement would have Peter Sørensen continuing as mayor, as the Social Democrats, the Green Left and the Red–Green Alliance all supported him.

== Electoral system ==
For elections to Danish municipalities, a number varying from 9 to 31 are chosen to be elected to the municipal council. The seats are then allocated using the D'Hondt method and a closed list proportional representation. Horsens Municipality had 27 seats in 2021

Unlike in Danish General Elections, in elections to municipal councils, electoral alliances are allowed.

== Electoral alliances ==
=== Electoral Alliance 1 ===
Party		Political alignment
A	Social Democrats	Centre-left
F	Green Left	Centre-left to Left-wing
Ø	Red–Green Alliance	Left-wing to Far-Left

=== Electoral Alliance 2 ===
Party		Political alignment
C	Conservatives	Centre-right
D	New Right	Right-wing to Far-right
K	Christian Democrats	Centre to Centre-right
M	Maren Spliid Gruppen	Local politics
V	Venstre	Centre-right

== Results by polling station ==
H = Miljølisten Horsens
M = Maren Spliid Gruppen
P = Frie Danske

Division	A	B	C	D	F	H	I	K	M	O	P	V	Ø
Division	%	%	%	%	%	%	%	%	%	%	%	%	%
Sønderbro	44.4	3.2	6.9	3.0	6.7	0.6	1.8	0.2	0.3	6.0	0.2	17.3	9.5
Vestbyen	45.1	3.6	9.8	3.7	5.0	0.7	2.2	0.2	0.4	5.7	0.1	15.7	8.0
Midtbyen	36.9	4.5	11.5	2.8	6.4	0.5	3.3	0.3	0.4	4.6	0.1	21.5	7.3
Endelave	66.4	1.6	3.2	4.0	2.4	0.0	0.0	0.0	0.0	4.8	0.0	8.8	8.8
Hatting	32.9	3.5	14.3	2.7	6.3	0.4	6.7	0.3	0.0	4.1	0.0	26.6	2.2
Torsted	38.5	2.7	11.0	2.9	6.9	0.5	2.9	0.5	0.4	6.0	0.0	24.3	3.6
Dagnæs	42.4	2.7	10.5	3.5	5.7	0.4	2.1	0.4	0.3	5.8	0.1	21.7	4.2
Forum	41.9	4.6	9.5	2.4	7.6	0.5	2.0	0.3	0.4	5.0	0.1	16.9	8.7
Lund	40.6	3.5	12.3	3.4	4.2	0.5	3.1	0.3	0.2	4.7	0.1	24.1	3.2
Egebjerg	43.2	3.1	12.5	3.5	5.4	0.3	2.7	0.2	0.7	5.2	0.0	18.2	4.9
Stensballe	26.2	5.0	15.2	2.1	4.2	0.5	10.2	0.3	0.2	3.2	0.0	28.8	3.9
Højvangen	35.0	3.1	12.7	2.2	6.3	0.4	2.8	0.2	0.3	4.4	0.0	28.5	4.1
Østbirk	39.0	1.8	5.1	5.0	4.2	0.7	1.2	0.3	0.3	5.1	0.0	34.2	3.2
Sdr.Vissing	40.9	3.4	6.7	3.4	5.1	1.6	0.8	0.5	0.0	5.9	0.0	25.7	6.1
Nim	23.4	12.5	7.1	4.3	4.4	0.7	1.7	1.7	0.1	6.8	0.1	33.1	3.9
Brædstrup	37.1	1.8	4.7	3.1	2.6	0.6	0.9	0.8	0.2	4.5	0.1	40.1	3.5
Gedved	33.1	3.2	11.2	3.9	8.1	0.4	1.9	0.4	0.6	4.3	0.1	25.7	7.0
Hovedgård	42.2	2.7	5.8	5.0	3.2	0.3	1.6	0.2	0.2	3.7	0.1	25.4	9.5
Søvind	39.3	2.5	8.9	5.3	6.2	0.9	1.4	0.5	0.2	3.5	0.1	24.9	6.2
Tønning-Træden	31.9	6.1	6.3	2.6	5.9	3.1	1.4	0.2	0.2	4.9	0.0	28.4	8.9
Sejet	33.3	1.4	14.2	2.1	4.6	0.0	2.1	0.7	0.4	19.1	0.0	17.0	5.0
Sundparken	57.4	3.2	3.2	1.7	5.5	0.2	1.6	1.0	0.1	4.1	0.1	9.9	11.9

== Results ==
Party		Votes	%	+/-	Seats	+/-
Horsens Municipality
A	Social Democrats	17,846	38.54	-4.65	12	-1
V	Venstre	11,135	24.05	+1.04	7	0
C	Conservatives	4,673	10.09	+5.98	3	+2
Ø	Red-Green Alliance	2,629	5.68	+0.99	1	0
F	Green Left	2,559	5.53	+1.60	1	0
O	Danish People's Party	2,305	4.98	-5.82	1	-2
B	Social Liberals	1,647	3.56	+1.32	1	+1
D	New Right	1,488	3.21	+2.47	1	+1
I	Liberal Alliance	1,422	3.07	-1.71	0	-1
H	Miljølisten Horsens	252	0.54	New	0	New
K	Christian Democrats	178	0.38	+0.12	0	0
M	Maren Spliid Gruppen	141	0.30	+0.05	0	0
P	Frie Danske	34	0.07	New	0	New
Total		46,309	100	N/A	27	N/A
Invalid votes		242	0.33	+0.11		
Blank votes		543	0.74	-0.02		
Turnout		47,094	63.83	-4.66		
Source: valg.dk
