= 1535 in Sweden =

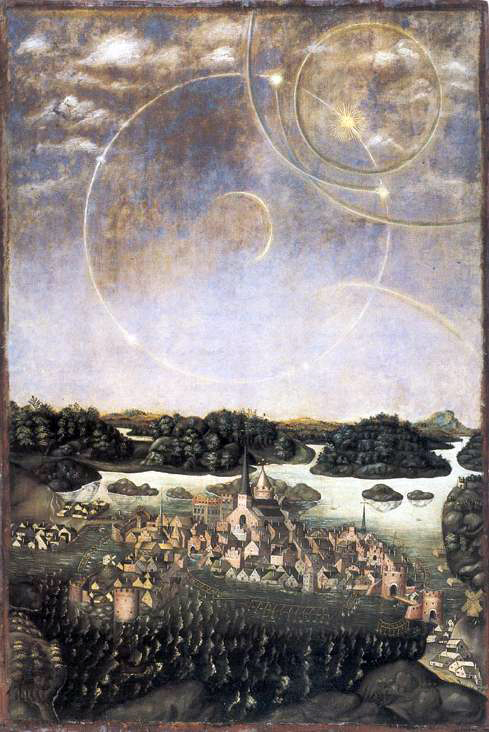
Vädersoltavlan cropped

Events from the year 1535 in Sweden

== Incumbents ==
- Monarch – Gustav I

== Events ==
- 13 January – Swedish victory at the Battle of Helsingborg (1535).
- 20 April – The appearance of Sun dogs leads to the painting of the Vädersolstavlan.
- June – Swedish victory at the Battle of Bornholm (1535).
- 11 June – Swedish victory at the Battle of Öxnebjerg.
- 16 June – Swedish victory at the Battle of Little Belt.
- November – Swedish victory at the Sea Battle of Copenhagen.

== Births ==
- 22 July – Catherine Stenbock, queen consort of Sweden (died 1621)

== Deaths ==
- July – Gustav Trolle, archbishop of Uppsala (born 1488)
- 23 September – Catherine of Saxe-Lauenburg, queen of Sweden (born 1513)
