= 1570 in Sweden =

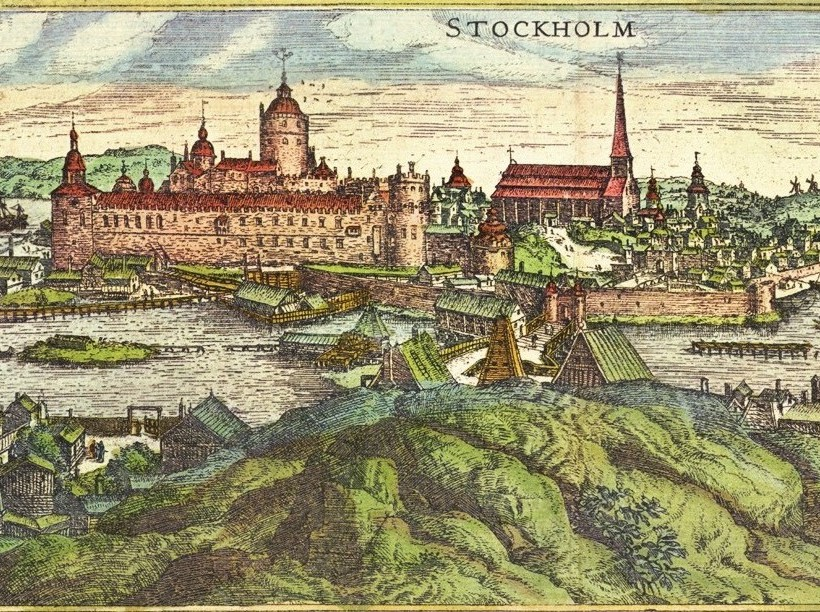

Events from the year 1570 in Sweden

The year 1570 was a significant one in the history of Sweden, marking the end of the Northern Seven Years' War against Denmark, Norway and its allies. The conflict concluded with the signing of the Treaty of Stettin, which restored peace in Scandinavia after seven years of warfare. During the same year, Sweden also resumed military operations in Livonia under King John III, reflecting the kingdom's continued involvement in regional conflicts.

== Incumbents ==
- Monarch – John III

== Events ==
- 27 February - The Danes burn Växjö: In the Northern Seven Years' War, the town of Växjö was burned by Danish troops, which resulted in substantial damage to the buildings and infrastructure.
- 21 August - Sweden renewed its military involvement in the Livonian War, continuing its efforts to strengthen its influence around the eastern Baltic Sea.
- 13 December – The Treaty of Stettin officially ended the Northern Seven Years' War. Although the treaty restored peace between Sweden and Denmark: Norway, many territorial disputes remained unresolved.

== Births ==
- 31 August - Gustav of Saxe-Lauenburg, prince (died 1597)
- - Ebba Bielke, baroness sentenced for high treason (died 1618)
