= 1597 in Sweden =

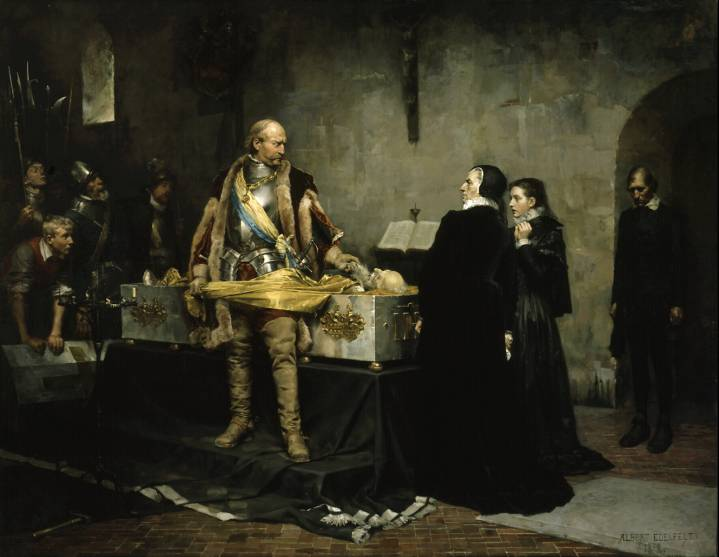
The regent duke Charles (later king Charles IX) insulting the corpse of Clas Eriksson Fleming in presence of the Dowager-Governor of Åbo (Turku), Ebba Stenbock. Albert Edelfelt’s painting, 1878.

Events from the year 1597 in Sweden

== Incumbents ==
- Monarch – Sigismund

== Events ==
- February 24 - End of the Cudgel War.
- Beginning of the War Against Sigismund.
- Bad harvests again cause famine.
- The Riksdag of Arboga confirm Duke Charles as regent, and the loyalists of the King flees to Poland.

== Deaths ==
- January 27 - Jaakko Ilkka, rebel leader of the Cudgel War (born 1545)
- 13 April - Klaus Fleming, admiral and governor (born 1535)
- 19 July - Gunilla Bielke, queen (born 1568)
- 20 November - Princess Elizabeth of Sweden, princess (born 1549)
- 11 November - Gustav of Saxe-Lauenburg, prince (born 1570)
