= Bornholm (disambiguation) =

Bornholm is an island in the Baltic Sea.

Bornholm may also refer to:

== Places ==
- Bornholm, Western Australia, a locality of the City of Albany
- Bornholm, Ontario, a small community in Canada
- Bornholm County, a former county in Denmark

== Other uses ==
- Battle of Bornholm (disambiguation), various clashes from 1227 to 1945
- 4453 Bornholm, an asteroid
- Bornholm disease, a viral disease
- Bornholm, a type of longcase clock
