= Østbirk Church =

Coordinates: 55°58′00″N 9°45′06″E

- Østbirk Kirke
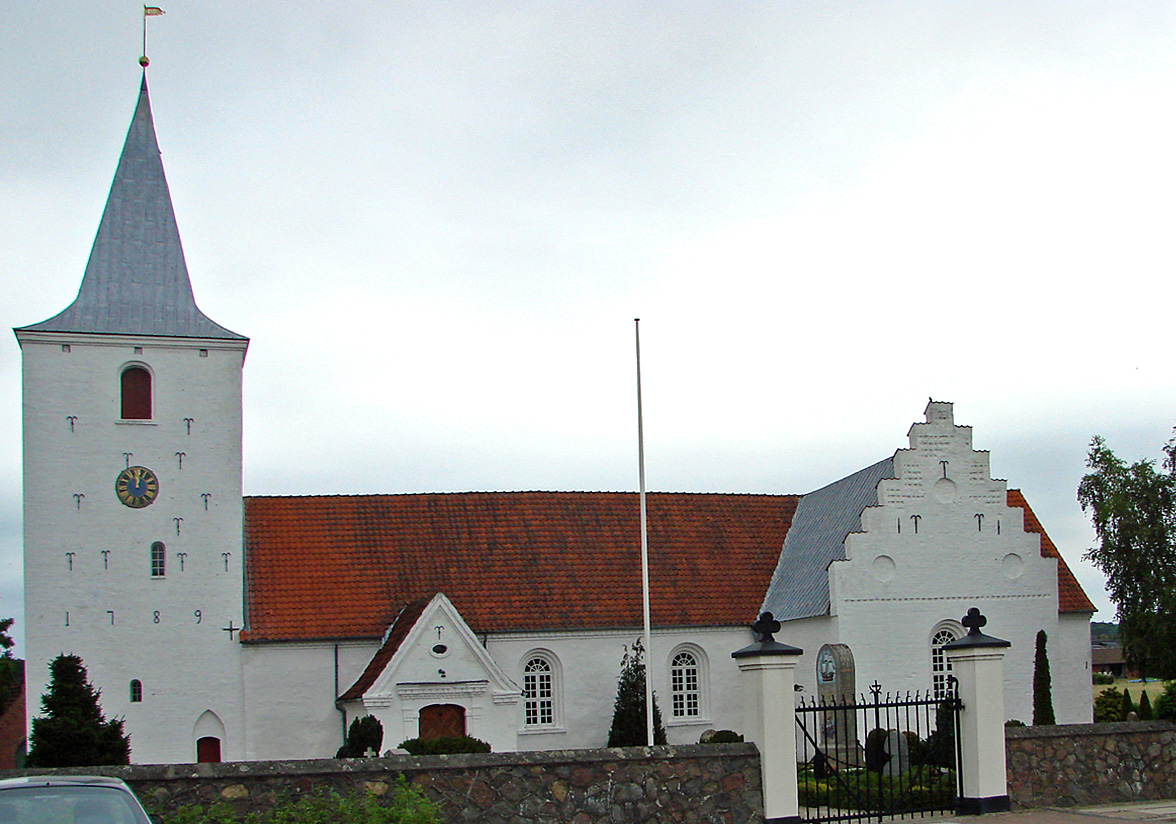
- Østbirk Church
- Location: Østbirk, Horsens Municipality, Denmark

History
- Consecrated: ca. 1200

Administration
- Diocese: Diocese of Aarhus
- Deanery: Horsens Provsti
- Parish: Østbirk Sogn

Østbirk Church (Danish: Østbirk Kirke) is a parish church in Horsens Municipality. It is overseen by the Diocese of Aarhus in the Church of Denmark.

The Church was constructed around the year 1200 and features romanesque and gothic architecture. It is decorated with 16th century frescos along with intricate woodwork and carvings.

== Parish history ==
The exact date of the church's establishment is unknown, though it was first recorded by written sources in 1267.

In the Middle Ages, Østbirk Church belonged to Voer Abbey. After the dissolution of the Abbey during the reformation, the church was a possession of the crown, who then passed ownership to Peder Skram. Skram was the owner of Urup Gods, a nearby estate, and its successive owners oversaw the church until the early 19th century. The church became independent in 1911.

Østbirk Church serves as the center of the parish of Østbirk Sogn. Until the 1970 Danish Municipal Reform, Østbirk Sogn was located in Voer Herred, a hundred in the former district of Skanderborg Amt. It was then part of Gedved Municipality until the Municipality Reform of 2007, when it was integrated into Horsens Municipality in the Central Denmark Region.

== Building ==
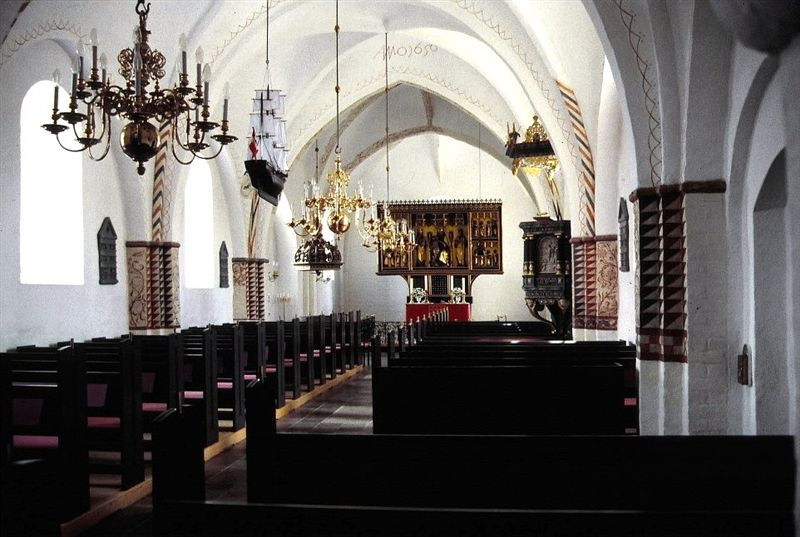
Nave

The oldest part of the church is believed to have been built around the year 1200. Its nave was built in a romanesque style out of rough fieldstone and travertine, and does not have a clear plinth. The tower and the southern wing of the choir were built in the late gothic era.

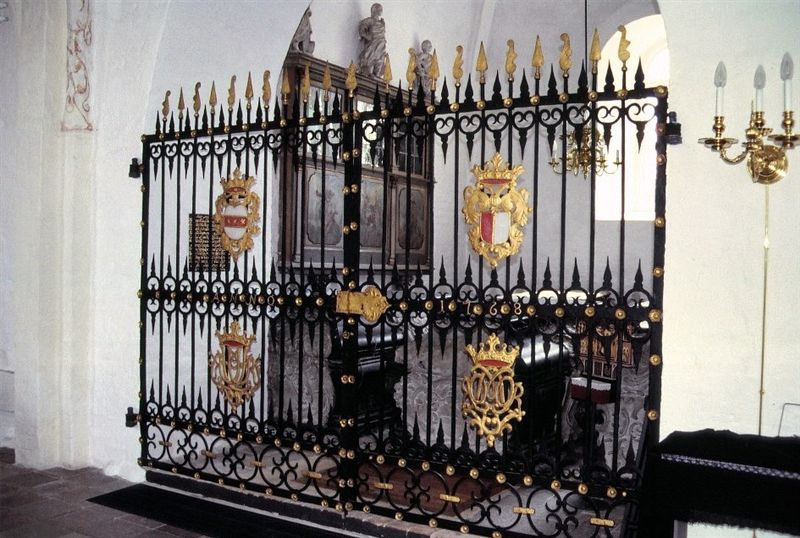
Burial chapel in the southern wing

The southern wing of the choir houses a burial chapel with raised sarcophagi . The chapel is decorated with allegorical paintings. A northern wing of the choir was later built and used as a burial chapel for Peder Skram. The northern wing was demolished in 1856, and the graves therein were moved to the churchyard. A memorial to Peder Skram and his wife was designed by Otto Evens and erected in 1886.

The church was largely renovated during the renaissance when the choir was replaced and a church porch was built. The building materials for the project came from the recently demolish Vrold Church (Vrold Kirke) and were donated by King Frederik II to Niels Skram.

The upper part of the church's tower was rebuilt in 1789, when its spire was added. The outside of the church door is adorned with two wooden carvings: a lion's head by Mogens Bøggild and a lamb by Hjalte Skovgaard, both of which were added in 1949.

=== Fixtures and decorations ===
A 13th century baptismal font is one of the church's original fixtures. Like most danish baptismal fonts of the time, it was originally painted with bright colors, but has since been returned to its granite state. It is 103 cm tall and engraved with carvings of a lion and dragon as a symbol of Jesus' struggle against sinful powers. A fontehimmel hangs above the baptismal font which was created by Arent Friederichsen Slache, an artist from Horsens. It was donated in the 1700s by Jørgen Gyldenkrone and his wife Vibeke Dorothea Gersdorff and is decorated with their coat of arms. Their family owned Urup, the church's surrounding area, from 1680 until 1720.

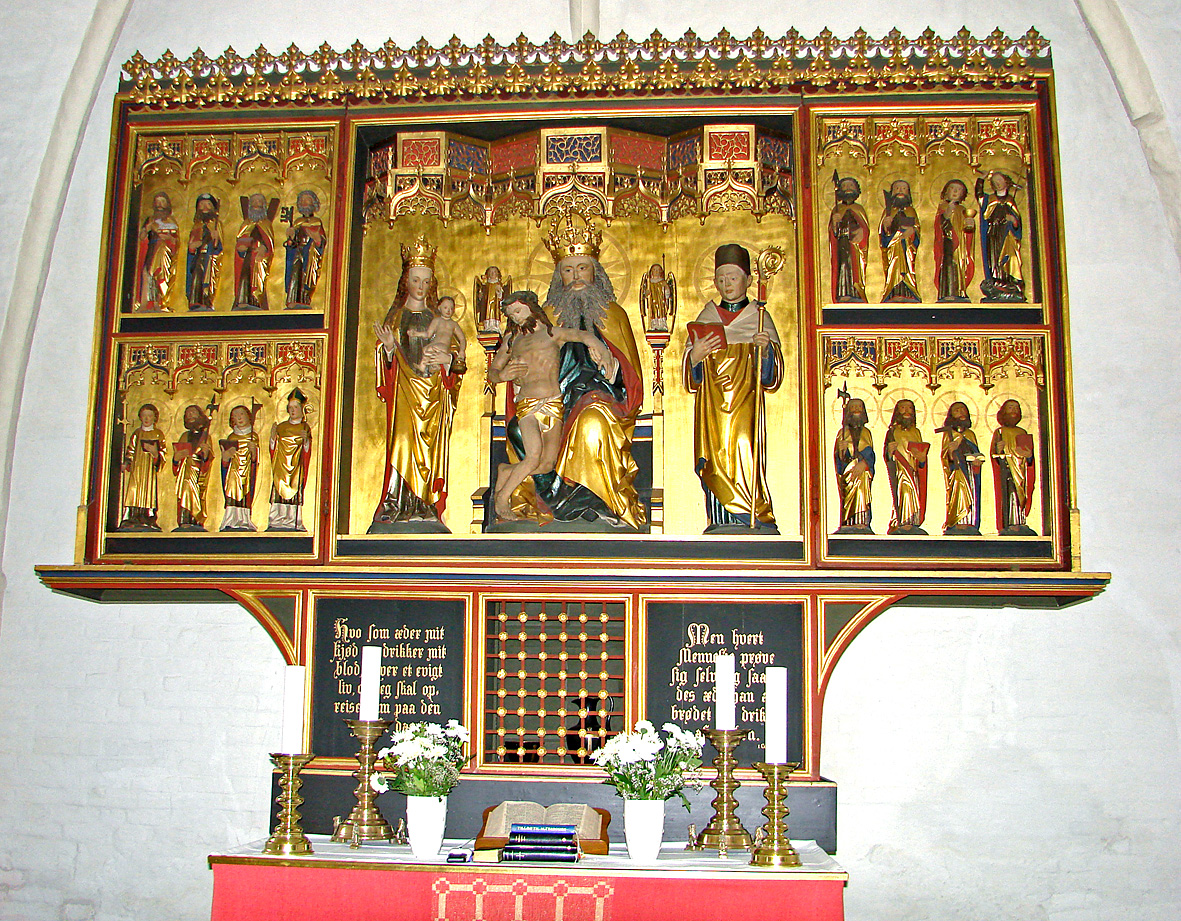
Altarpiece

The church's three-paneled altarpiece is from the late Gothic era. According to an inscription, which is no longer legible, it was created around 1480 by an artist named Vilhelm Klover from Lübeck. The altarpiece was originally installed at Ring Abbey (Ring Klosterkirke). In 1582, after Ring Abbey was demolished, the work was donated by King Frederick II to Niels Skram, who owned Østbirk Church at the time. The king had previously donated pieces from the demolished Vrold Church as well.

Its middle panel features carved figures of Mary, Jesus, God, and Benedict of Nursia. On the adjacent panels, they are flanked by the twelve apostles along with four other saints. When the side panels are closed, eight paintings are revealed which depict scenes in Jesus' life along with several saints, including: Clare of Assisi, Martin of Tours, Erasmus of Formia, Saint Gertrud, Margaret the Virgin, Catherine of Alexandria, Saint Barbara, and Dorothea of Caesarea. These paintings are displayed on special occasions, namely from Fastelavn through Easter.

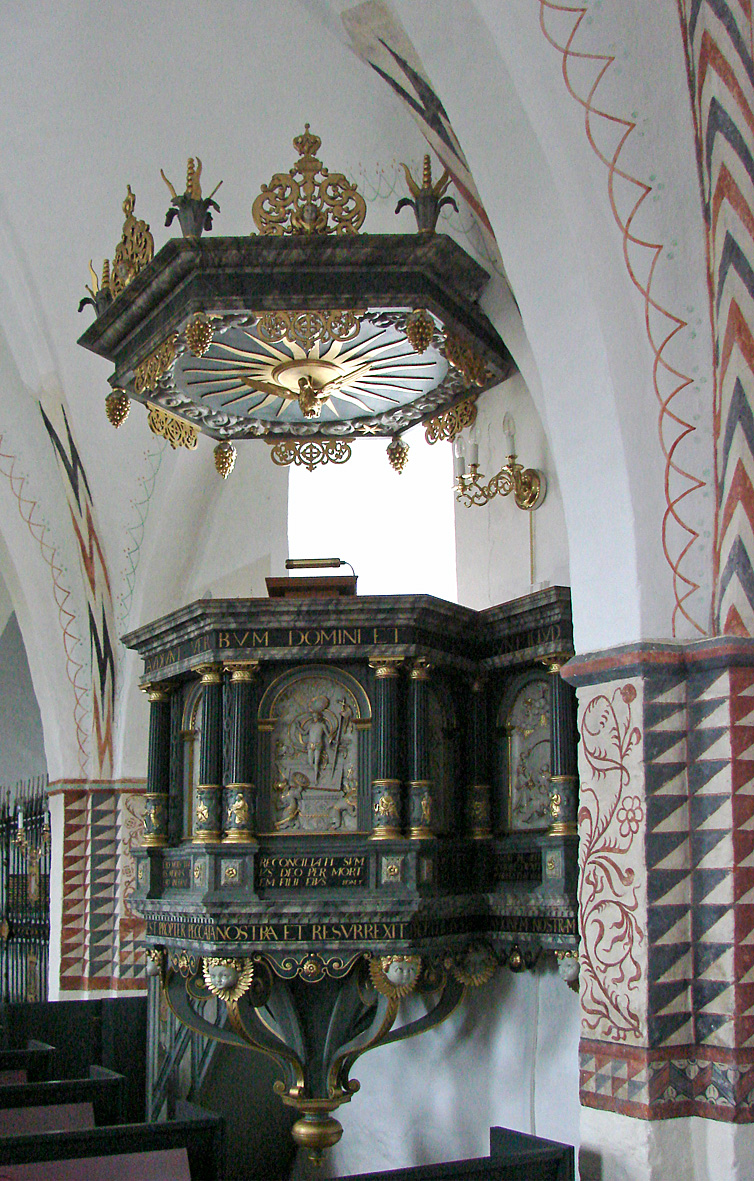
Pulpit

The pulpit, constructed in the 1590s, was likely designed by Mikkel van Groningen who also built the pulpit at the Aarhus Cathedral. It is decorated with scenes from the bible, including: the fall of man, the crucifixion, and the resurrection. The scene depicting the fall of man is inscribed, in latin, with the phrase: "With Adam death came into the world." Above the pulpit hangs a sounding board, which prevents speeches from being quieted by the church's high vaults. An inscription on the podium reads: "There is nothing to remove, nothing to add" (“Intet at trække fra, intet at lægge til”).

In 1995, the nave was restored and frescos from the beginning of the 16th century were uncovered. The frescos include a depiction of Saint Antonius and the arms of Christen Skram and his wife Anne Reventlow. Frescos on one of the vaults are dated as 1656, which is presumably the date of a previous restoration. A votive ship also hangs in the center of the nave which was installed in 1920.

The organ facade in the back of the nave was built in 1775, but has since bee restored several times—most recently in 2004. Above the organ, Yahweh is written in Hebrew and surrounded by a solar wreath.

== Gallery ==
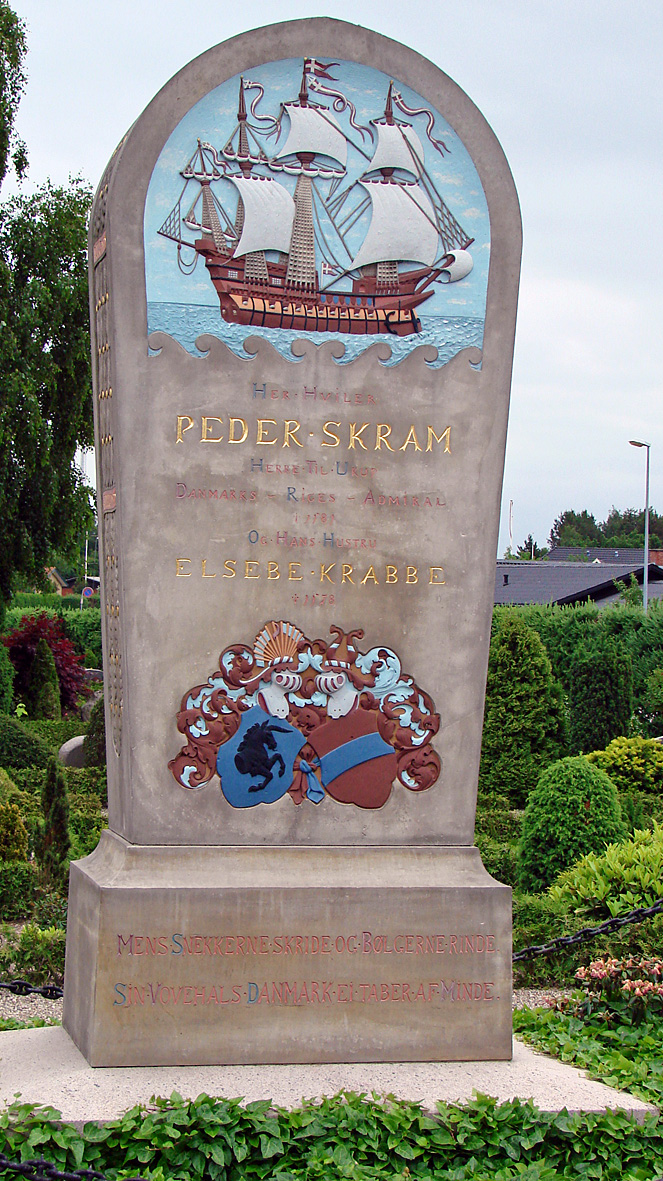
Memorial to Peder Skram

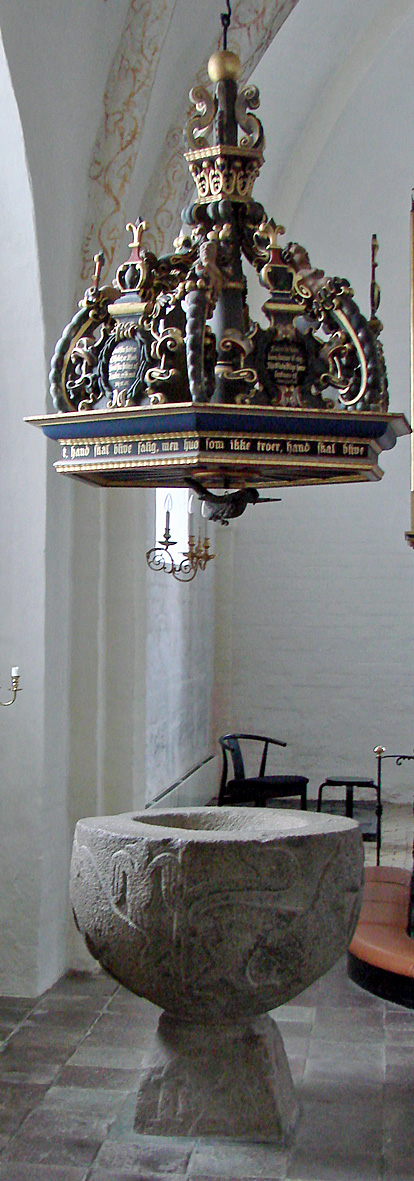
Granite baptismal font with overhanging Fontehimmel

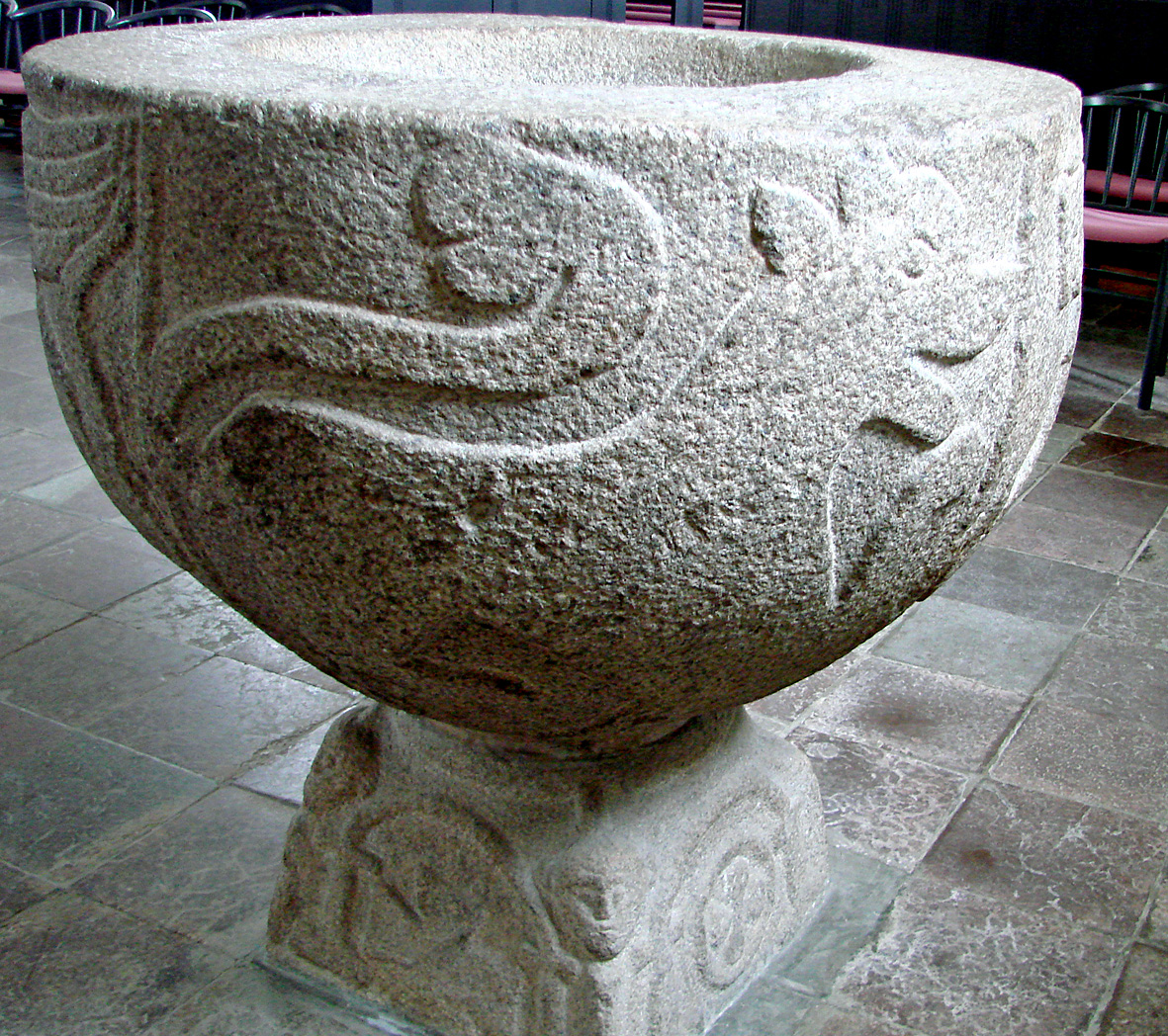
Engravings on the baptismal font

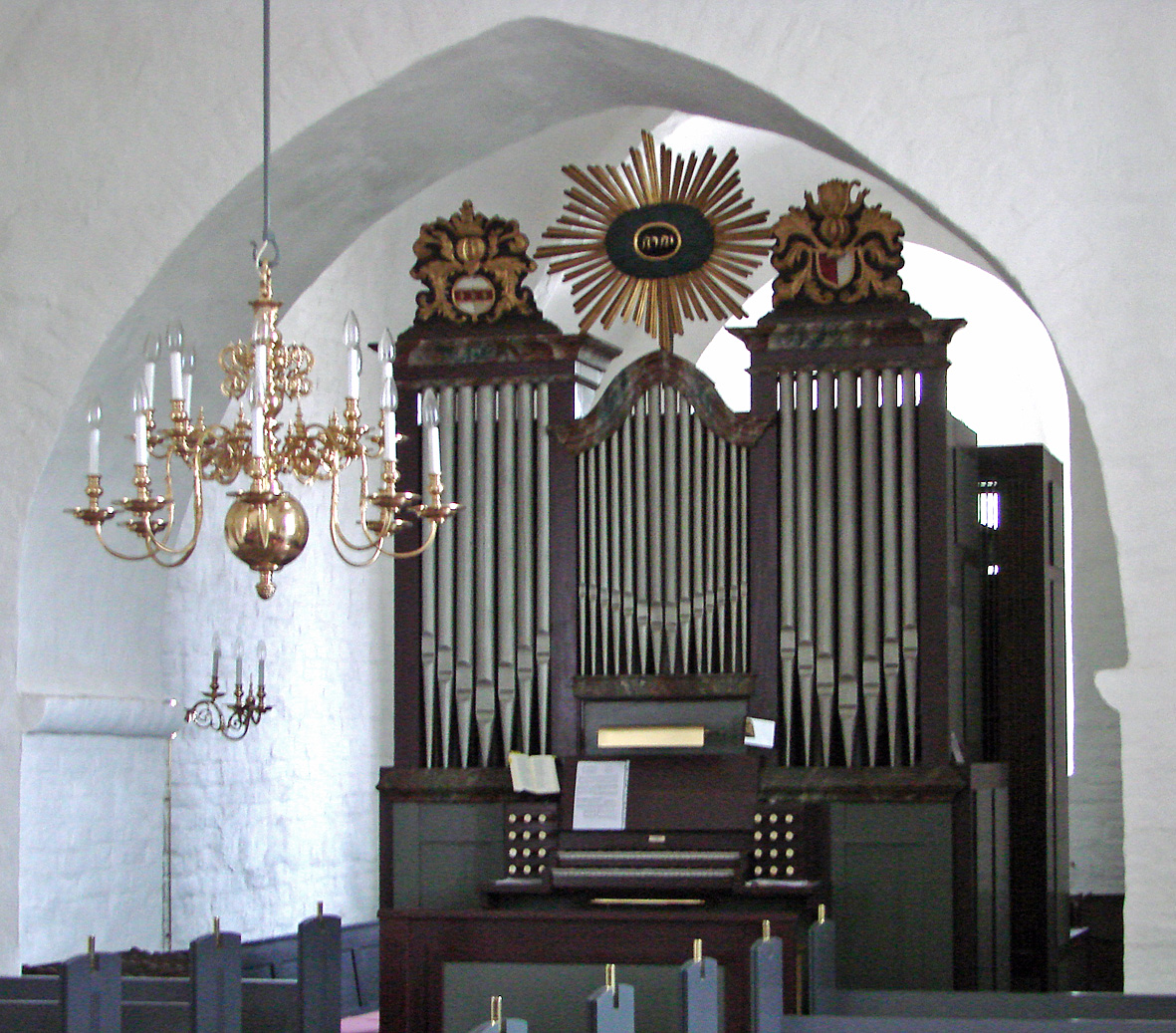
Church organ

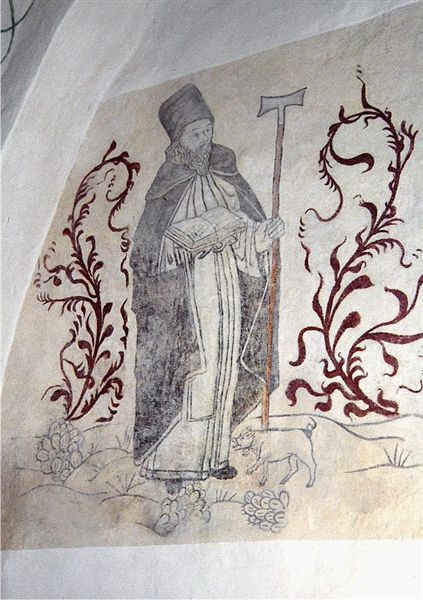
Fresco on the northern side of the nave depicting Saint Antonius

== Notable Burials ==
- Peder Skram
