= Otto Evens =

Danish sculptor (1826–1895)

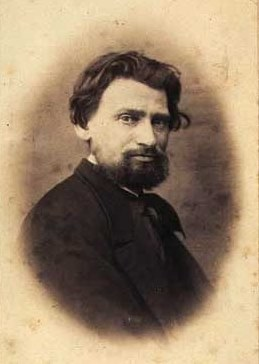
- Portrait of Otto Evens, 1865
- Born: 16 February 1836; Copenhagen, Denmark
- Died: 21 November 1895 (aged 69); Copenhagen
- Resting place: Assistens Cemetery, Copenhagen
- Education: Royal Danish Academy of Fine Arts
- Known for: Sculptor

Otto Frederik Theobald Evens (16 February 1826 - 21 November 1895) was a Danish sculptor.

== Early life and education ==
Evens was born in Copenhagen, the son of brazier Thomas Mandix Evens (1791-1870) and his wife Ane Margrethe Frederiksen (1790-1853). He was articled to his father and later J. Dalhoff. In 1843, he was admitted to the Royal Danish Academy of Fine Arts and became an assistant in Herman Wilhelm Bissen's studio when he was in his twenties. He won the academy's small silver medal in 1846, its large silver medal in 1849 and the small gold medal in 1851 for Thetis bønfalder Vulkan om Vaaben til Achilles. In 1857, after several unsuccessful attempts, he won the Neuhausen Prize for the group sculpture Maternal Love (Moderkærlighed).

He spent a couple of months in Paris in 1856 and was in Italy in 1858–61 on a stipend from the academy. In 1865, he returned to Italy on a grant from the Ancher Foundation (Det Ancherske Legat).

== Career ==
Evens belonged to the group of sculptors who, with Bissen and H. E. Freund, continued the Neoclassical tradition from Bertel Thorvaldsen but gradually represented the transition to Naturalism.

Evens remained a minor figure in Danish sculpture. His works include a memorial to Ewald and Wessel at Trinitatis Church in Copenhagen (1879). He also contributed to the decoration of the Marble Church with the statue of Hieronymus and created the group sculpture Faun and en Satyr for the complex at Gammeltorv in Aalborg (1850) and A Neapolitan Fisherman Teaches His Son to Play the Flute for Store Strandstræde in Copenhagen and on Rustenborgvej in Lyngby-Taarbæk (1861).

He also created two memorials to Caroline Amalie (1882 in Sorgenfri Palace Park, Lyngby-Taarbæk and Frederik VII which was installed on the marketplaces in Give (1868), Næstved (1870) and Sorø (1877). He has also portrayed a number of historical figures, including Saxo and Snorre, Herluf Trolle, Birgitte Gøye, Arild Hvidtfeldt, Griffenfeld and Niels Juel.

== Personal life ==
Evens never married. He died in 1895 and is buried in Assistens Cemetery in Copenhagen.

== Selected works ==
=== Public art and memorials ===
- Boy With Goat, Frederikssundsvej, Copenhagen (1854)
- A Neapolitan Fisherman Teaches His Son to Play the Flute, Store Strandstræde, Copenhagen (1861). Rustenborgvej, Lyngby-Taarbæk
- Monument to Johannes Ewald and Johan Herman Wessel, Trinitatis Church square, Copenhagen (1879)
- Memorial to Caroline Amalie, Sorgenfri Palace Park, Lyngby-Taarbæk (1882)
- Memorial to Frederik VII, Give (1868), Næstved (1870) and Sorø (1877).
- Tomb of N.J. Marstrand and his wife,(Assistens Cemetery, Copenhagen)
- Font, Church of Our Lady (Vor Frue Kirke (Svendborg))
- Memorial to Peder Skram, Østbirk Kirke (1886)

=== Other works ===
- Thetis bønfalder Hefaistos om Vaaben til Achilles Royal Danish Academy (plaster relief, 1851)

== Image gallery ==
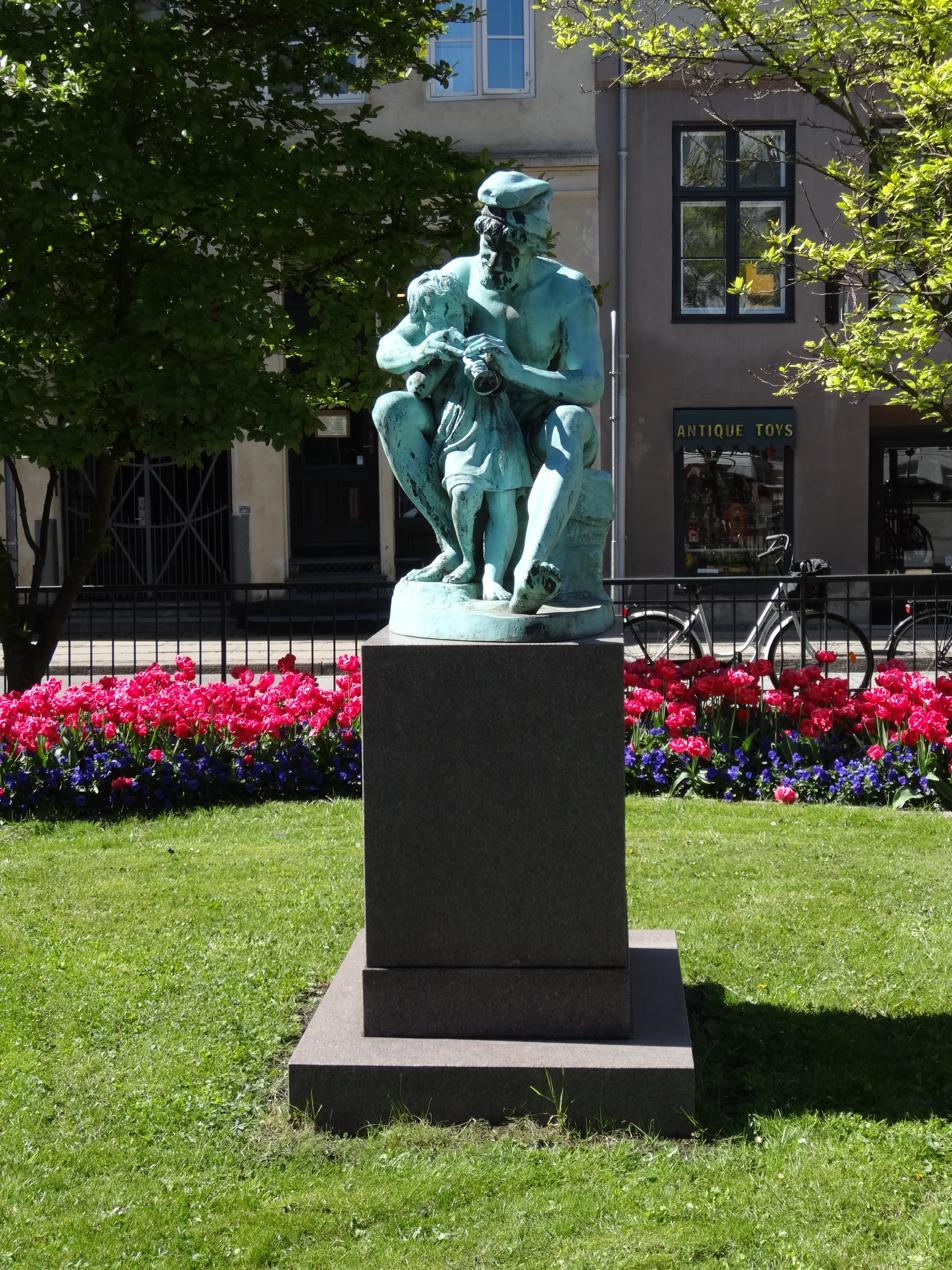
A Neapolitan Fisherman Teaches His Son to Play the Flute

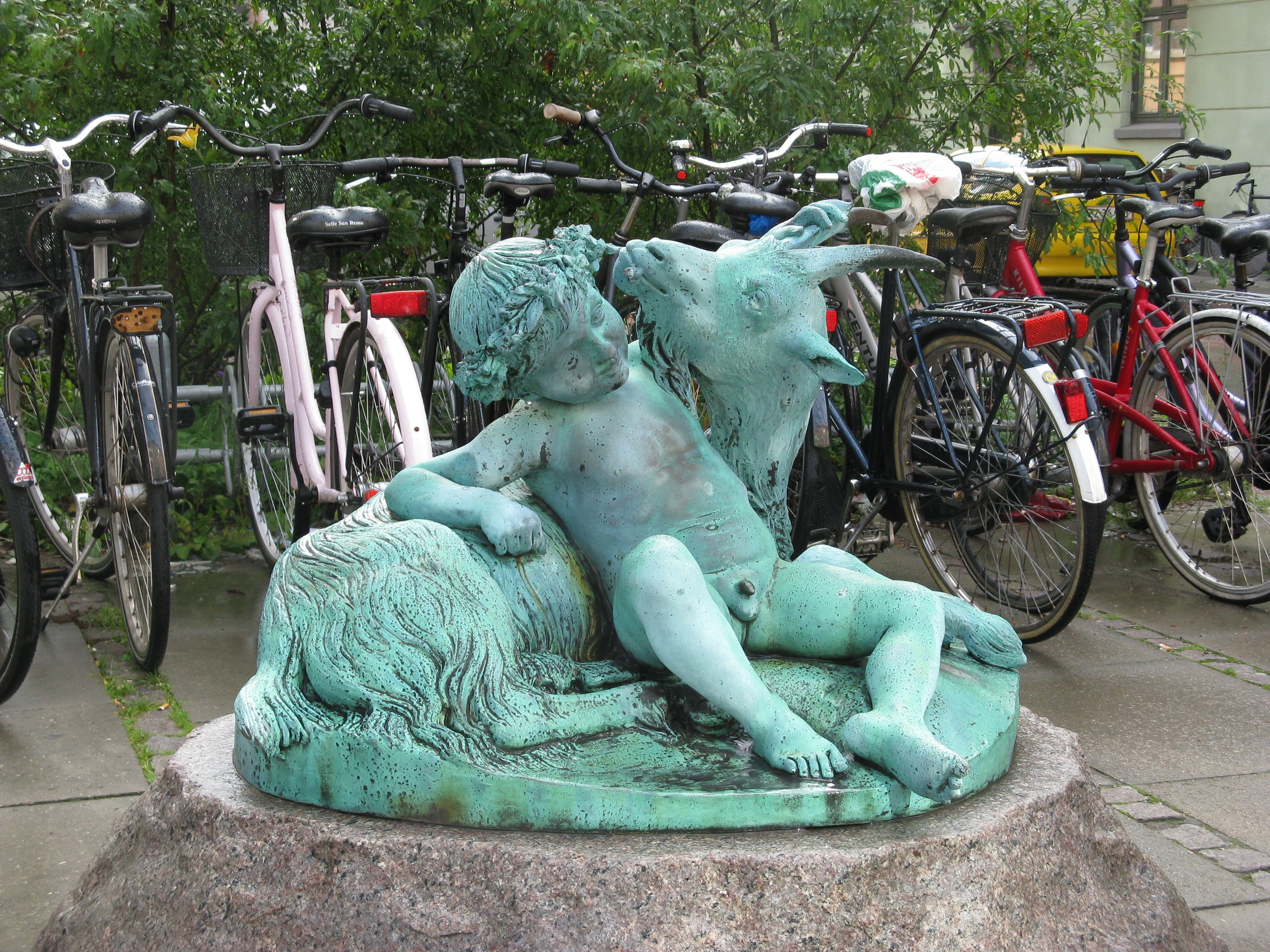
Boy With Goat

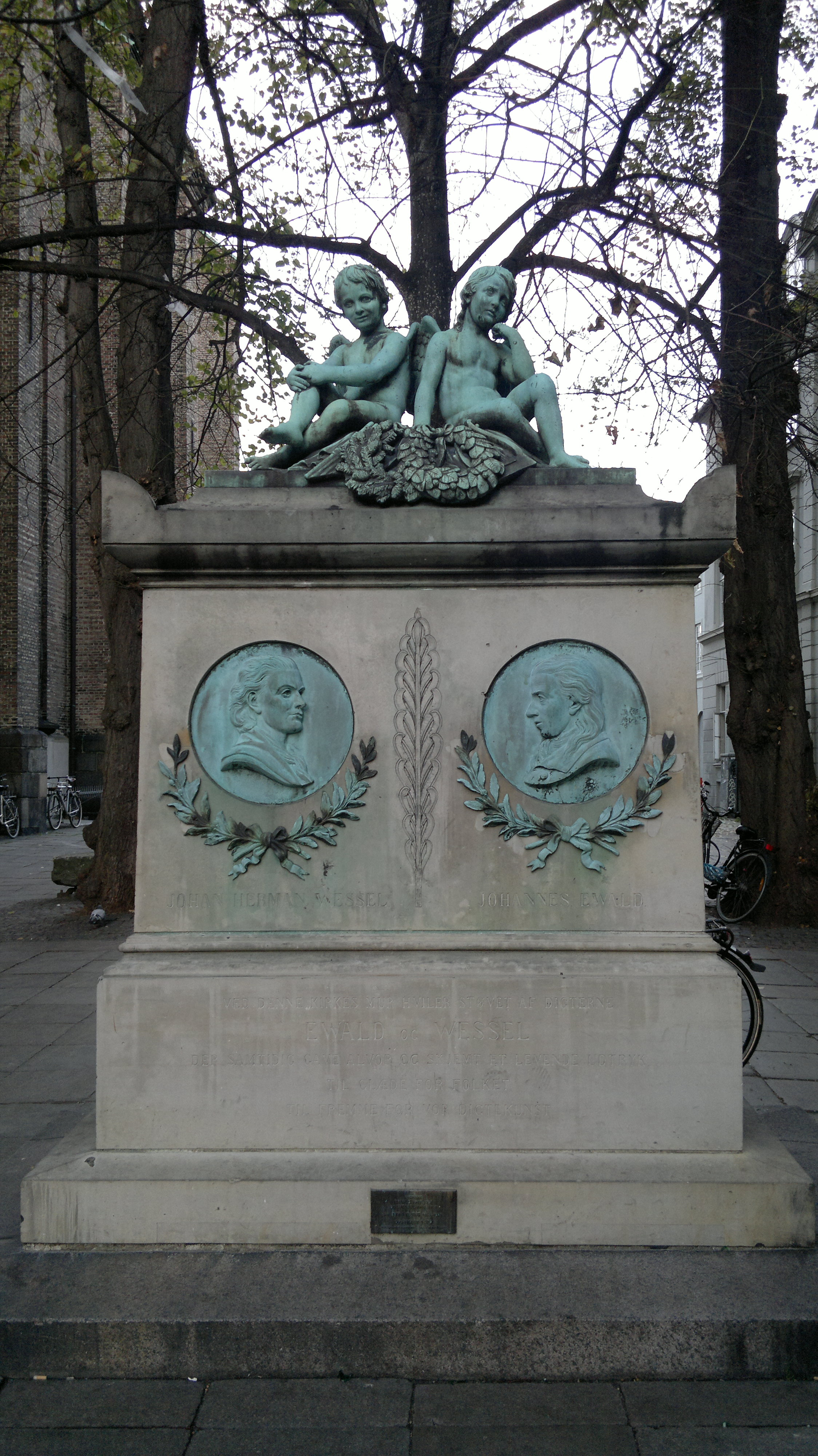
Monument to Ewald and Wessel

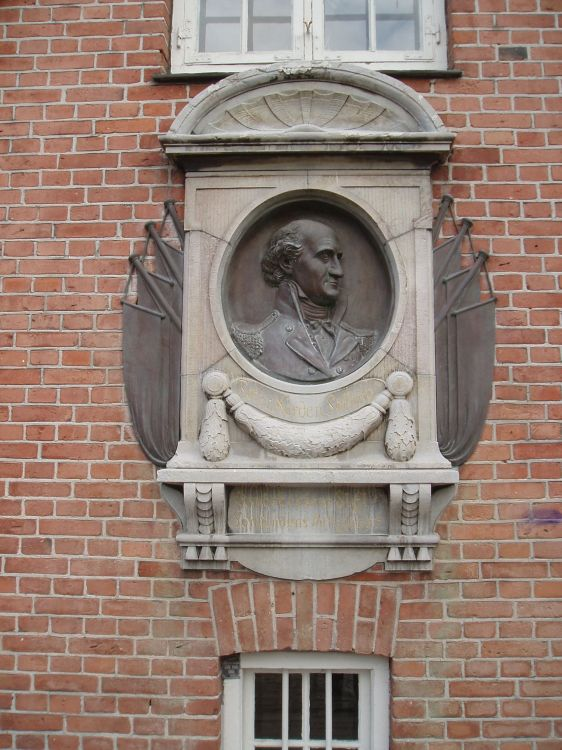
PeterNordenSoelling memorial, Bombebøssen, Copenhagen
