= Battle of Bornholm =

Battle of Bornholm may refer to the following battles:

- Battle of Bornholm (1227)
- Battle of Bornholm (1456)
- Battle of Bornholm (1535)
- Battle of Bornholm (1563), a naval action precipitating the Northern Seven Years' War
- Battle of Bornholm (1565)
- Battle of Bornholm (1676), a naval battle between a Danish-Dutch and a Swedish fleet during the Scanian War
- Battle of Bornholm (1945)
