= Jürgen Wullenwever =

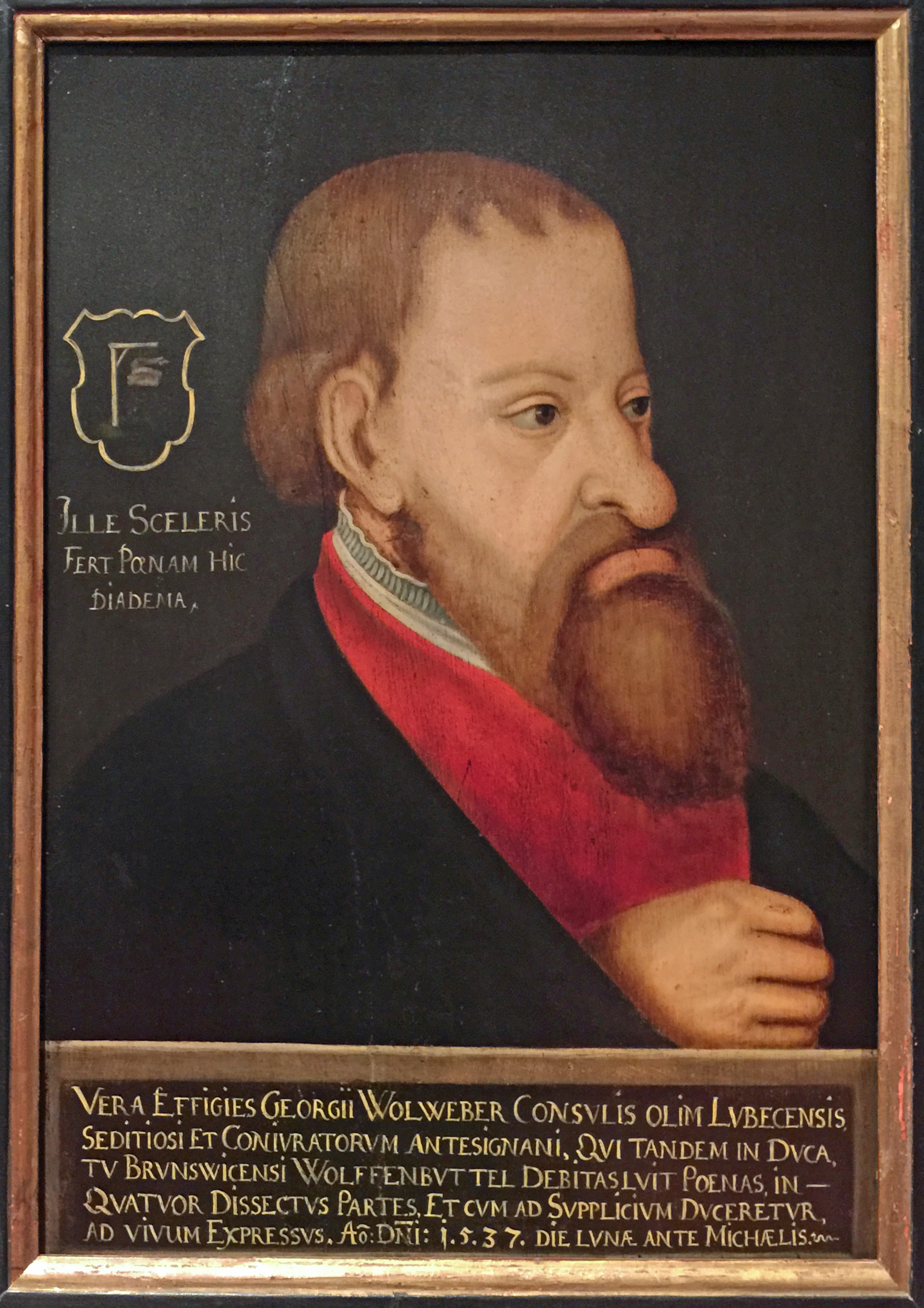
Parody portrait of Jürgen Wullenwever.

Jürgen Wullenwever (c. 1492 – 29 September 1537) was burgomaster of Lübeck from 1533 to 1535, a period of religious, political and trade turmoil.

== Biography ==
Wullenwever was probably born at Hamburg in 1492. Settling in Lübeck as a merchant he took some part in the risings of the inhabitants in 1530 and 1531, being strongly in sympathy with the democratic ideas in religion and politics which inspired them. Having joined the governing council of the city and become leader of the democratic party, he was appointed burgomaster early in 1533 and threw himself into the movement for restoring Lübeck to her former position of influence.

Preparations were made to attack the Dutch towns, the principal trading rivals of Lübeck, when the death of Frederick I, king of Denmark, in April 1533 changed the position of affairs. The Lübeckers objected to the bestowal of the Danish crown upon any prince favorable to the Empire or the Roman Catholic religion, and Wullenwever went to Copenhagen to discuss the matter. At length an alliance was concluded with Henry VIII of England; considerable support was obtained in North Germany; and in 1534 an attack was made on Christian, Duke of Holstein, afterwards King Christian III, who claimed the throne, involving Lübeck in the Danish civil war known as the Count's Feud.

At first the Lübeckers gained several successes, but Christian of Holstein appeared before Lübeck; the efforts of Wullenwever to secure allies failed; and the citizens were compelled to make peace. The imperial court of justice at Speyer restored the old constitution, and in August 1535 the aristocratic party returned to power. Soon afterwards Wullenwever was seized by Christopher of Brunswick-Lüneburg, archbishop of Bremen, and handed over to his brother Henry II, Duke of Brunswick-Wolfenbüttel. Having been tortured and sentenced to death as a traitor and an Anabaptist, he was beheaded at Wolfenbüttel.

== Legacy ==
Wullenwever, who was long regarded as a popular hero in Lübeck, inspired tragedies by Heinrich Kruse and Karl Ferdinand Gutzkow, and a novel by Ludwig Köhler.

The biography of Anne Boleyn written by Jean Bruller ("Vercors") describes in considerable detail the course of Henry VIII's alliance with Wullenwever, concluded at the time when Anne Boleyn was Queen and involved herself in the running of England's foreign policy.
