= Battle of Little Belt =

1535 naval battle

- Part of Count's Feud
Date	16 June 1535
Location	Little Belt, Denmark
Result	Allied victory

Belligerents
Free City of Lübeck & the Hanseatic League	Sweden; Denmark; Prussia

Commanders and leaders
Unknown	Måns Svensson Some; Peder Skram

Strength
10 ships	Est. 20 ships

Casualties and losses
1 ship burnt 9 ships captured	Negligible

The Battle of Little Belt was a naval battle between a combined Swedish/Danish/Prussian fleet and a fleet from Lübeck on 16 June 1535, during the Count's Feud. The battle ended in a heavy defeat for Lübeck.
