= Sigrid Neiiendam =

Danish actress (1868–1955)

- Born: Sigrid Marie Elizabeth Andersen; 31 May 1868; Gedved, Denmark
- Died: 25 January 1955 (aged 86); Frederiksberg, Denmark
- Occupations: Actress, author
- Years active: 1888 – 1952
- Spouse: Robert Neiiendam
- Parent(s): Johan Henrik Andersen, Sophie Frederikke Rasmussen

Sigrid Marie Elisabeth Neiiendam (née Anderson; 31 May 1868 – 25 January 1955) was a Danish actress who played some 200 parts at the Royal Danish Theatre in Copenhagen. She is remembered in particular for her interpretations of Ludvig Holberg's plays.

== Early life ==
Born on 31 May 1868 in Gedved in central Jutland, she was the daughter of school principal Johan Henrik Andersen and his wife Sophie Frederikke Rasmussen. She spent her childhood on the island of Møn where her father headed Rødkilde Højskole. In her book Sigrid Neiiendam fortæller, published in 1943, she remembers how she started to imitate the many different people who visited the school, providing a basis for her theatrical work.

In 1888, she passed the entrance examination to the Royal Theatre's drama school. She studied under actor Olaf Poulsen and theatre director William Bloch.

== Acting career ==
In 1893 she moved to Dagmarteatret where she performed in Johanne in Leth Hansen's Ungdomsleg. After spending time with her father as he traveled throughout Denmark, in 1900 she was engaged by J. F. Dorph-Petersen of Folketeatret where she acted in a number of modern plays by Gustav Wied, Hjalmar Bergstrøm, Emma Gad and Palle Rosenkrantz. She was described as playing a "wonderfully lively and uncontrollably amusing" Trine in Ellen Reumert's Tvillingerne. In July 1901, she married the theatrical historian Robert Neiiendam (1880–1966).

In 1911, Karl Mantzius called her back to the Royal Theatre where she remained until 1942, playing almost 200 different roles, 24 of them in plays by Holberg including Magdelone in Den Stundesløse, Gedske Klokkers in Barselstuen, and Nille in Erasmus Montanus. She was skilled at imitating dialects, often playing women from Jutland. The theatre critic Frederik Schyberg ascribed her success in the history of Danish drama to two factors: enchanting her Copenhagen audiences by introducing a new dimension in playing rural characters; and the way in which she "more than any of our contemporaries contributed to bringing out Holberg's lively characters". Neiiendam was also successful in films, including Vredens Dag (1943) and Fra den gamle købmandsgård (1951).

Sigrid Neiiendam died on 25 January 1955 in Frederiksberg.

== Awards ==
Neiiendam was awarded the Ingenio et Arti medal in 1922 and a Tagea Brandt scholarship in 1941. In 1952, she received a Bodil as best supporting actress in Fra den gamle Købmandsgård.
