= 1549 in Sweden =

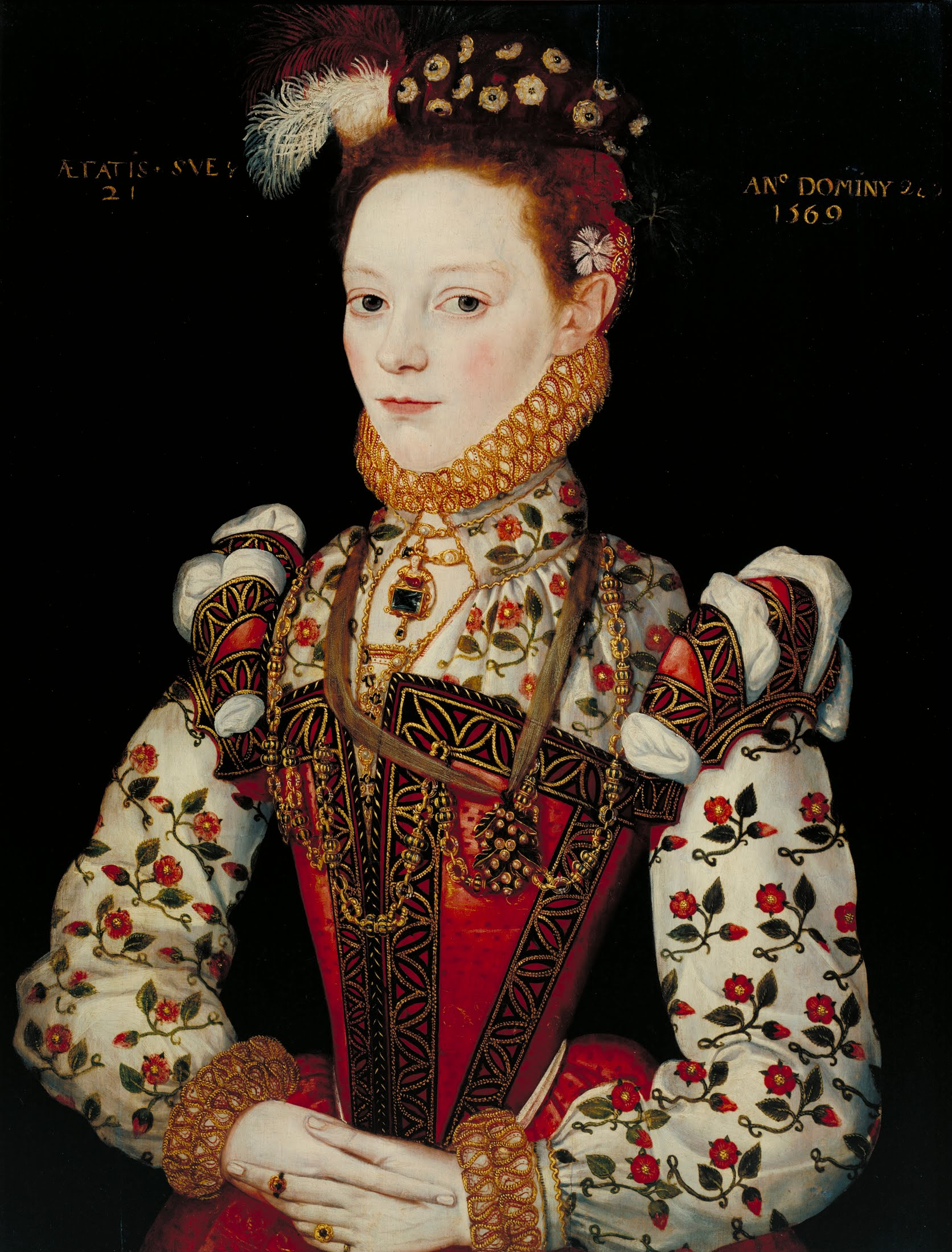
A Young Lady Aged 21, possibly a portrait of Helena von Snakenborg, circa 1569.

Events from the year 1549 in Sweden

== Incumbents ==
- Monarch – Gustav I

== Events ==
- The male section of the Vadstena Abbey is dissolved and the monks are forced to leave, while the nuns are allowed to remain.
- The kings nephew Per Brahe the Elder is appointed riksråd.
- Enhancement the National Defense and Fortifications, fortifications were constructed and military reforms implemented to protect Sweden from Danish and Russian Threats during Nordic tensions.
- Expanded mining activities especially copper production in Falun.
- Construction begins at Uppsala Castle

== Births ==
- 5 April - Princess Elizabeth of Sweden was born, princess (died 1597)
- Date unknown - Helena, Marchioness of Northampton, courtier (died 1635)

== Deaths ==
- 21 November - Ebba Eriksdotter Vasa, mother in law of the king (born unknown date)
