= Østbirk =

- Town
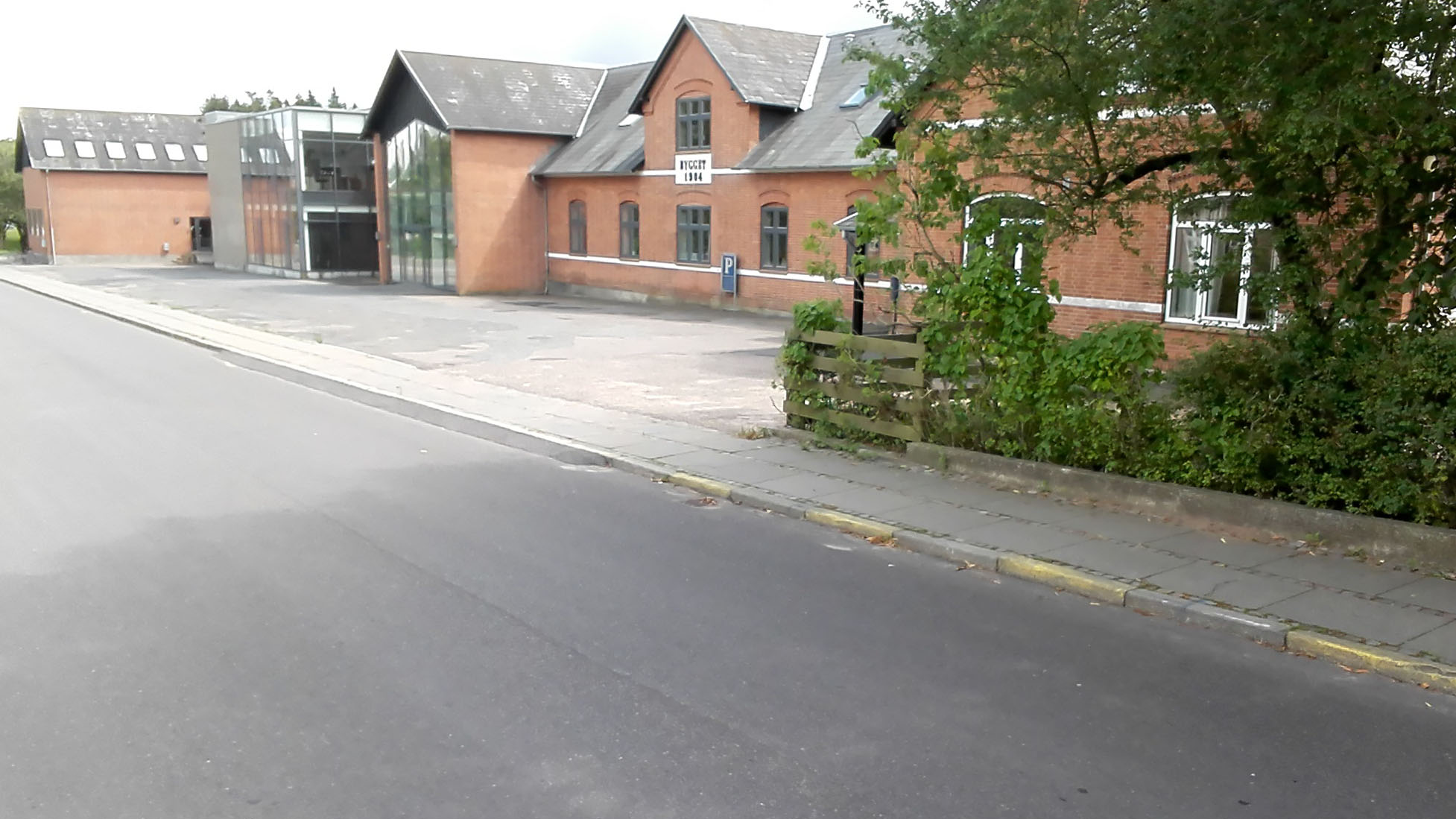
- Østbirk School

- Location in Denmark Østbirk (Central Denmark Region)
- Coordinates: 55°58′0″N 9°44′59″E
- Country: Denmark
- Region: Central Denmark
- Municipality: Horsens Municipality

Area
  - Urban: 2 km^{2} (0.77 sq mi)

Population (2026)
  - Urban: 2,652
  - Urban density: 1,300/km^{2} (3,400/sq mi)
- Time zone: UTC+1 (CET)
  - Summer (DST): UTC+2 (CEST)
- Postal code: DK-8752 Østbirk

Østbirk is a town, with a population of 2,652 (1 january 2026), in Horsens Municipality, Central Denmark Region, in Denmark, situated 11 km east of Brædstrup, 16 km southwest of Skanderborg and 15 km northwest of Horsens.

Østbirk Church, where the admiral and naval hero Peder Skram is buried, is located in the town.

The Østbirk School is also in an Eruopean Partner Programm (the so calles Erasmus + programm) with the Germany Franz-Stock-Realschule, the spanish Institut Eugeni Xammar in L'Ametla del Vallès and the Icelandic Ingunnarskóli school in Reykjavík.
