= Battle of Bornholm (1535) =

- Part of Count's Feud
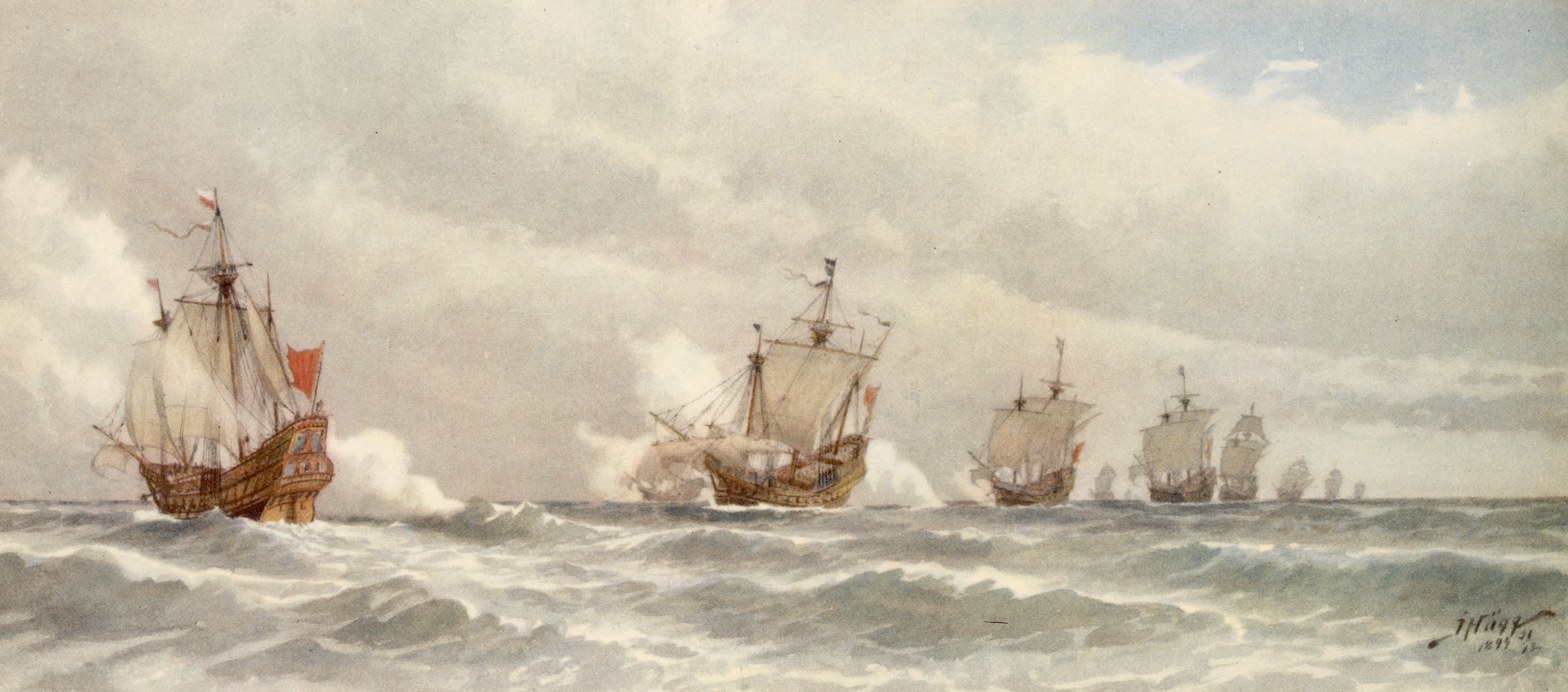
- The Battle of Bornholm, painting by Jacob Hägg (1894)
Date	June 1535
Location	Off the coast of Bornholm
Result	Allied victory

Belligerents
Free City of Lübeck and Hanseatic League	Sweden; Denmark; Royal Prussia; Holstein

Commanders and leaders
Unknown Lübeck commander	Måns Svensson Some; Peder Skram; Johan Pein

Strength
26 Lübeck warships with unknown crew strength.	20 allied warships c. 4,000 men, of which c. 11 Swedish ships with c. 2,500 men.

Casualties and losses
At least 148	74

The Battle of Bornholm was a naval engagement that took place in June 1535. The conflict saw Lübeck and the Hanseatic League engaged against the forces of Sweden, Prussia, Holstein, and Denmark. The Battle of Bornholm was part of the larger Count's Feud.

== Cause of the battle ==
In June 1535, Sweden joined with Duke Christian of Gottorp, later crowned King Christian III, in the conflict later known as the Count's Feud. After the Danish King Frederick I died in 1533, a conflict began between the Danish nobility and their successor, Christian III versus the East Danish Citizenship, led by Copenhagen, Malmö, and Landskrona in alliance with Lübeck. Duke Christian allied with his brothers-in-law Albert of Prussia and Gustav Vasa, the king of Sweden. When Sweden joined the conflict, Christian III was fighting on two fronts and desperately needed help.

== Assembling the fleet ==
Before sending their fleet to Denmark and Christian III, the Swedish needed an experienced Danish "guide" to assist the Swedish commander, thus Gustav Vasa appointed the Danish noble Peder Skram. He (Gustav Vasa) distrusted Skram and sent an additional letter to the Swedish commander Måns Svensson Some giving him secret orders. It is important to know that an admiral's task was not to sail the ship, but command it in battle. In Swedish territory, Måns was commander. Later in Danish waters, Peder Skram had the command of the fleet.

The fleet set sail from Stockholm and stopped in Söderköping to bring on board butter. Next, the fleet sold iron in Kalmar and about 1,800 soldiers joined.

Outside the Swedish island Gotland the Swedish fleet met the rest of the allies, from Holstein and Prussia. The Prussian fleet was led by Admiral Johan Pein, who contributed seven warships, of which one ship was large, with a crew of about 900 men. From Holstein, there are no records of how many ships, only that they were small and few. (2 small ships?).

== Allied ships ==
Stora Kravelen commanded by Måns Svensson Some and Peder Skram with about 1,000 men Kamperman unknown commander, Jacob Bagge a later famous admiral in the Russian war (1555-1557) was on board, but not commander.

== Lübeck ships ==
Michael unknown commander

== The Sea Battle of Bornholm ==
June 8, the Lübeck ships are sighted outside Bornholm and the battle begins when the largest Swedish ships Stora Kravelen and Kamperman engaged the large Lübeck ships. Stora Kravelen began by attacking Michael but got its "fallmast" destroyed and its maneuverability decreased but Stora Kravelen was supported by Kamperman, and during the time spent repairing the damage, Michael barely avoided being boarded and fled.

According to contemporary information, the Stora kravelen could quickly follow up the retreating Michael but not board it, thus it was forced to use artillery. Because of this, the battle of Bornholm is one of the first sea battles fought only with artillery (cannons). When the smaller Prussian and Holstein ships arrived, the Lübeck ships fled the battle.

== Casualties ==
Stora Kravelen lost 74 men, Michael probably lost 2–3 times more, all other casualties are unknown.
