= Landing at Bornholm =

1945 Soviet operation in Denmark in WWII

Landing on Bornholm
- Part of the Occupation of Denmark
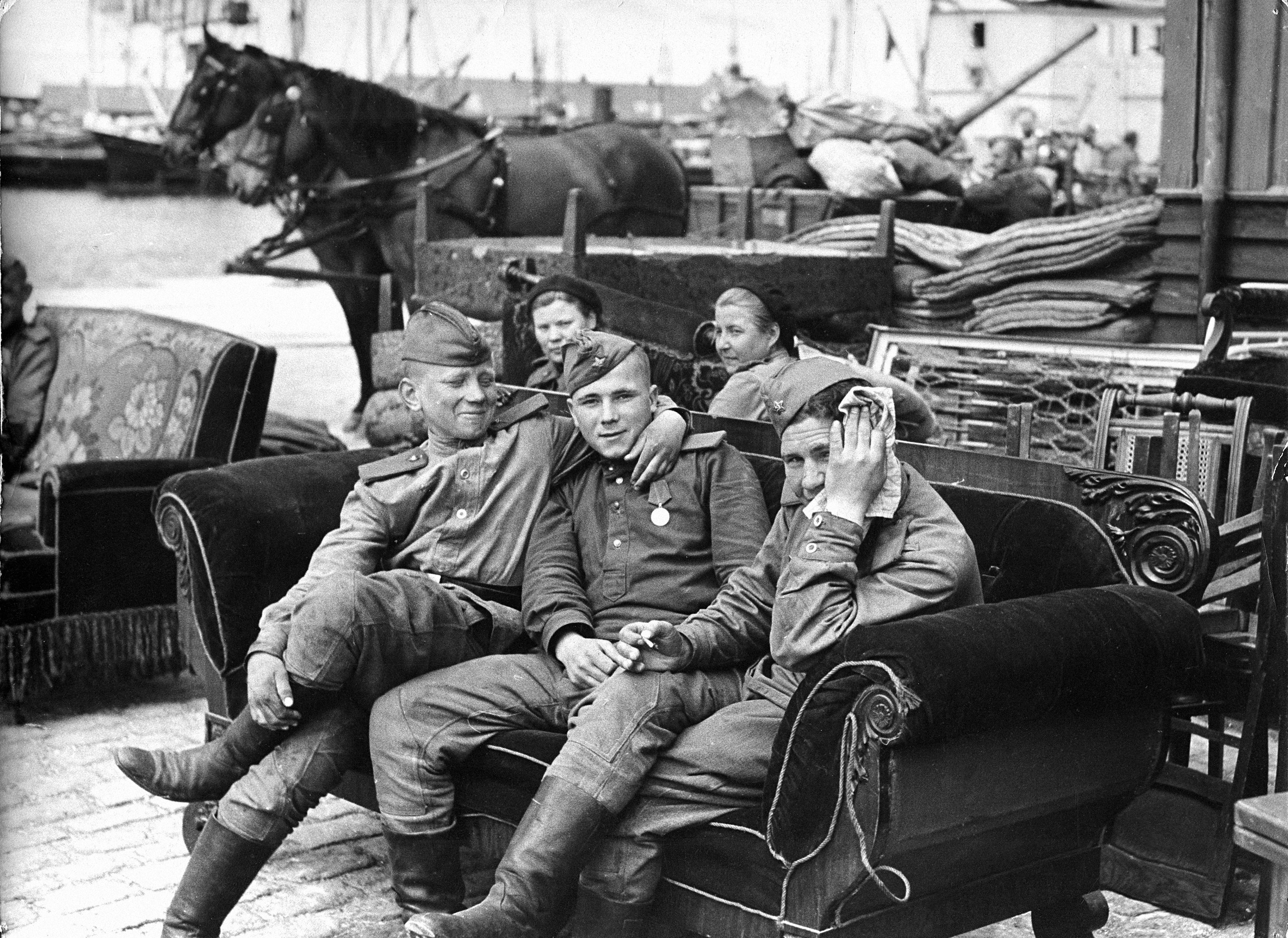
- Soviet soldiers at Bornholm.
Date	9 May 1945
Location	Bornholm, Denmark
Result	Soviet victory
Territorial changes	Soviet occupation of Bornholm until it was returned to Denmark on 5 April 1946

Belligerents
(Nazi Germany) Germany	Soviet Union

Commanders and leaders
(Nazi Germany) Gerhard von Kamptz	(Soviet Union) Vladimir Tributs (Soviet Union) Fyodor Korotkov

Strength
12,000 Troops	Unknown

The landing at Bornholm was a Soviet military operation to capture the Danish island of Bornholm after it was heavily bombarded by the Soviet Air Force in May 1945 during the closing days of World War II. The German garrison commander, German Navy Captain Gerhard von Kamptz (1902–1998), refused to surrender to the Soviets, as his orders were to surrender to the Western Allies. The Germans sent several telegrams to Copenhagen requesting that at least one British soldier should be transferred to Bornholm, so that the Germans could surrender to the Western Allied forces instead of the Soviets. When von Kamptz failed to provide a written capitulation as demanded by the Soviet commanders, Soviet aircraft bombed and destroyed more than 800 civilian houses in Rønne and Nexø and seriously damaged roughly 3,000 more on 7–8 May 1945. The population had been forewarned of the bombardments, and the towns were evacuated, but 10 local people were killed. Soldiers were also killed and wounded. Some of them were volunteers from the Baltic states, especially from the Latvian SS Legion.

During the Soviet bombing of the two main towns on 7 and 8 May, Danish radio was not allowed to broadcast the news because it was thought it would spoil the liberation festivities in Denmark. On 9 May Soviet troops landed on the island, and after a short fight, the German garrison (about 12,000 strong) surrendered. Soviet forces left the island on 5 April 1946 as part of the post-war division of interests of the Soviet Union and the Western Allies. Denmark was to be Western aligned, and in return the Baltic states were to be kept in the Soviet sphere of influence.
