= Søvind =

- Town
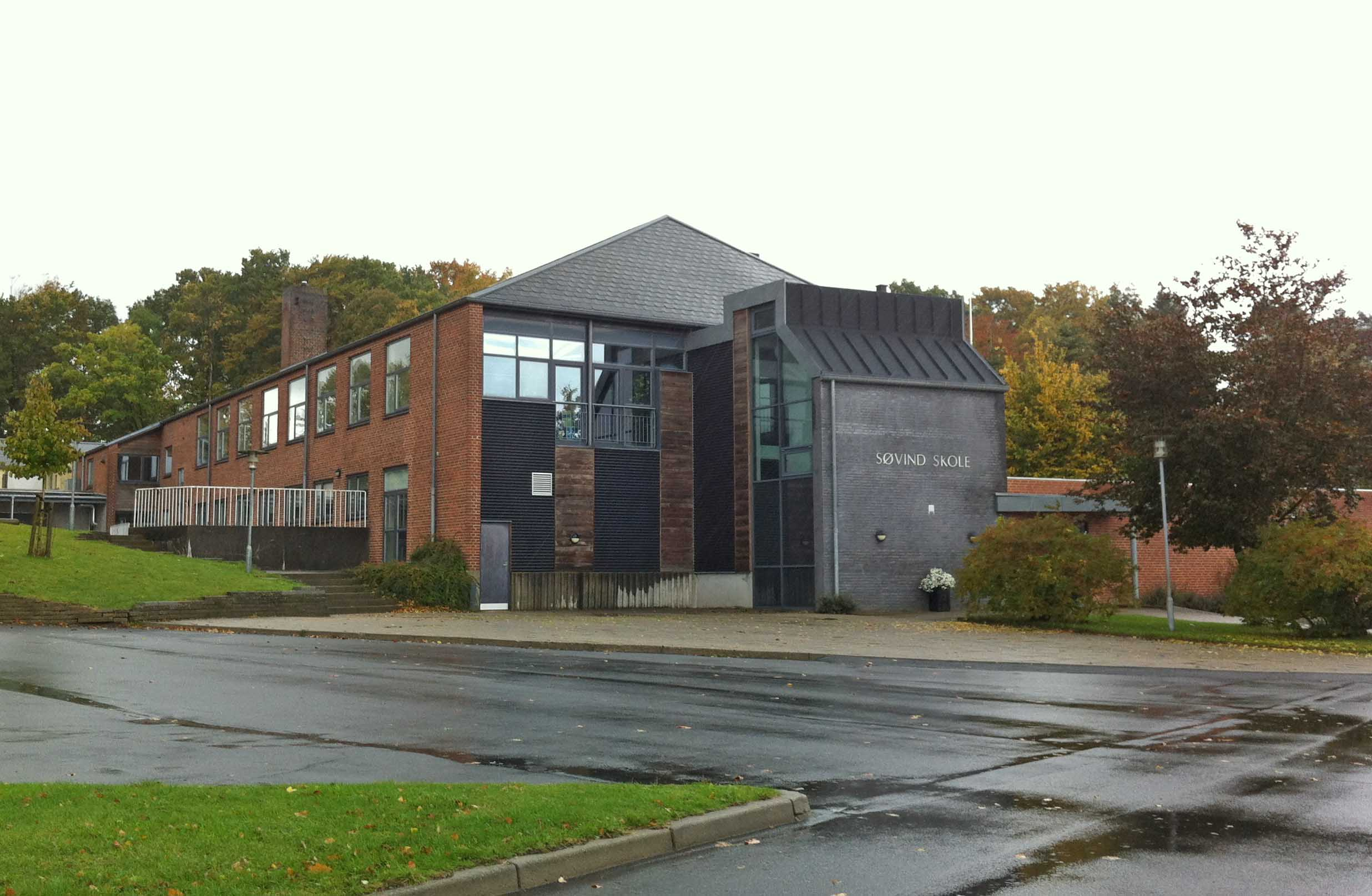
- Søvind School

- Location in Central Denmark Region Søvind (Denmark)
- Coordinates: 55°53′41″N 10°0′5″E
- Country: Denmark
- Region: Central Denmark (Midtjylland)
- Municipality: Horsens Municipality

Area
  - Urban: 0.9 km^{2} (0.35 sq mi)

Population (2026)
  - Urban: 1,114
  - Urban density: 1,200/km^{2} (3,200/sq mi)
- Time zone: UTC+1 (CET)
  - Summer (DST): UTC+2 (CEST)
- Postal code: DK-8700 Horsens

Søvind is a small town, with a population of 1,114 (1 January 2026), in Horsens Municipality, Central Denmark Region in Denmark. It is located 14 km southwest of Odder, 13 km southeast of Gedved and 11 km northeast of Horsens.

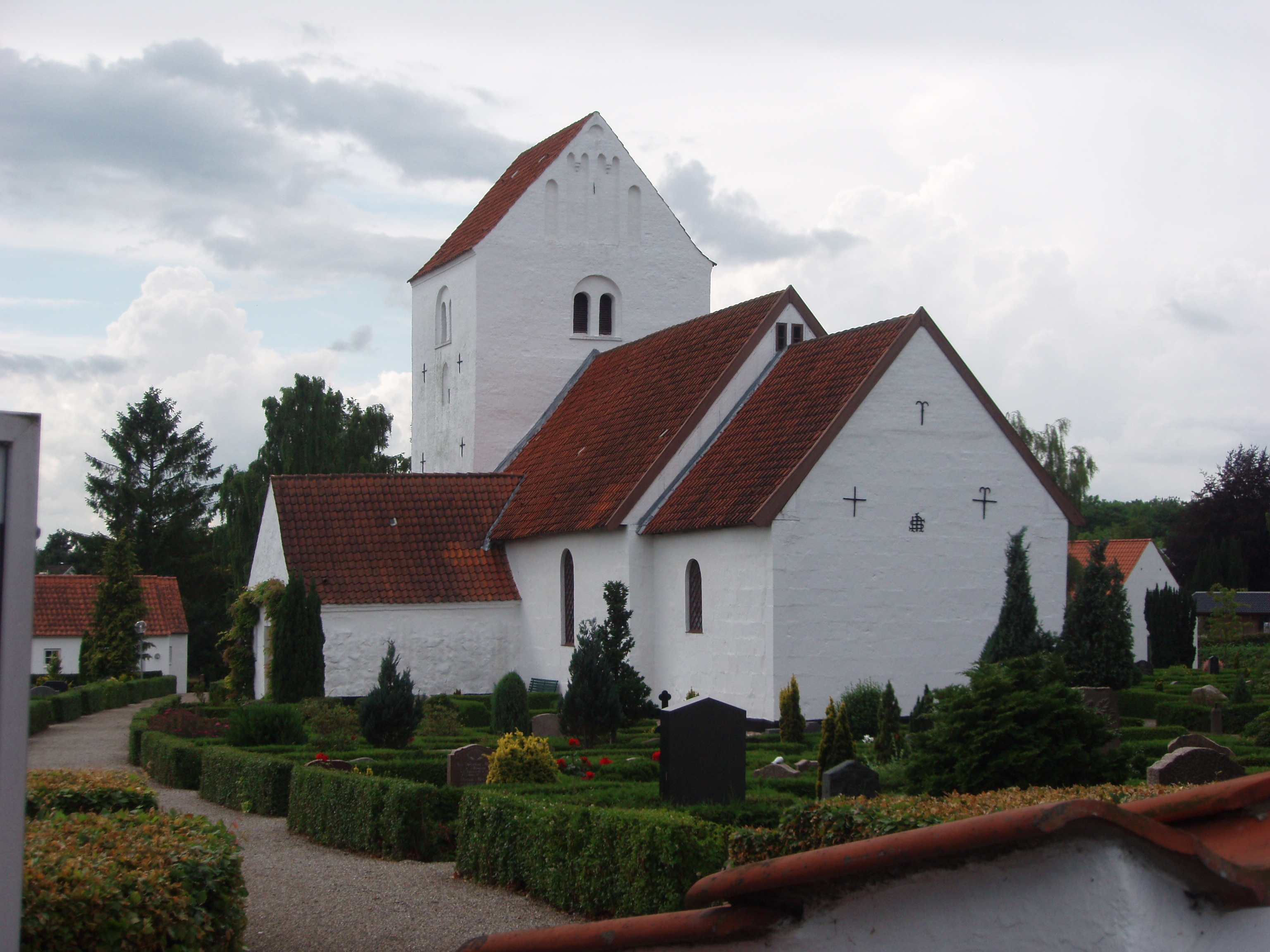
Søvind Church

Søvind Church is located in the town.
