= 1618 in Sweden =

Events from the year 1618 in Sweden

== Incumbents ==
- Monarch – Gustav II Adolf

== Events ==
- 18 October – Foundation of the National Archives of Sweden: Chancellor Axel Oxenstierna appoints clerks to formalize state documentation, establishing the modern Riksarkivet.
- Circa 1618 – Administrative reform: Oxenstierna reorganizes the Kammarkollegiet into a multi-departmental institution, a model for modern Swedish bureaucracy.
- Autumn – Polish–Swedish War armistice: Truce ends this phase of the Polish–Swedish War (1600–1629), halting conflict over Livonia and Estonia.
- Reprinting of Stadslagen: The old town law is reaffirmed as municipal legal code, remaining in effect until 1734.
- 4 November – Sara Simonsdotter brothel scandal: Police raid a brothel on Kindstugatan operated by "Tjocka Sara", revealing a network involving clergy and nobles. Consequences include:
  - a failed prison escape aided by soldiers,
  - public fines for elite clients,
  - Simonsdotter’s public whipping in May 1619,
  - her deportation to Finland,
  - and execution of two prostitutes on 7 June 1619.
- May – Thirty Years’ War begins: Sweden observes the outbreak of the Bohemian Revolt. Although neutral, Gustavus Adolphus begins positioning the kingdom for later involvement.

== Births ==
- Olaus Verelius (1618–1682) – Philologist and antiquarian; his editions of Old Norse texts shaped early Swedish historiography.

== Deaths ==
- John, Duke of Östergötland (1589–1618) – Prince and half-brother to the king.
- Princess Maria Elizabeth of Sweden (1596–1618) – Sister of Gustavus Adolphus; died shortly after her husband, John, Duke of Östergötland.
- Ebba Bielke – Noblewoman convicted in the Bielke affair; died in prison after her treason trial.

== See also ==
- Timeline of Swedish history
- Gustavus Adolphus of Sweden
- Thirty Years' War
- Polish–Swedish Wars
- Early Vasa era
- Swedish Empire
