= Count's Feud =

1534–1536 civil war in Denmark

- Part of European wars of religion and Danish-Hanseatic Rivalry
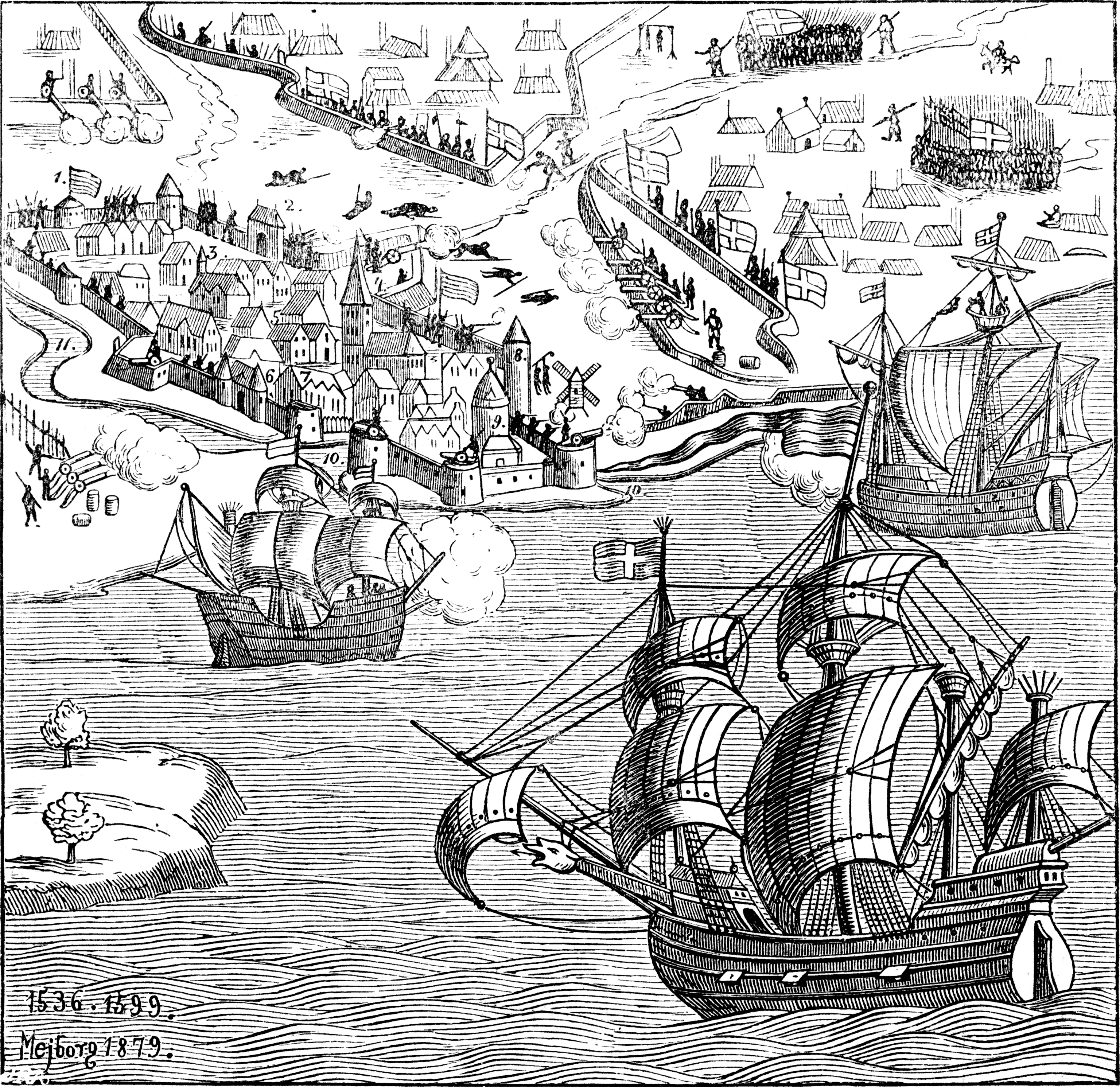
- The siege of Copenhagen 1535–1536.
Date	May 1534 – 29 July 1536
Location	Denmark
Result	Protestant victory
Territorial changes	Protestant unification of Denmark; Beginning of the formation of Denmark-Norway

Belligerents
Catholics under Christian II Combatants: Danish Realm: Scania Malmö Copenhagen Zealand Foreign interventions: County of Oldenburg Free City of Lübeck Supported by: Norwegian nobles Habsburg Netherlands England	Protestants under Christian III Combatants: Danish Realm: Schleswig Holstein Jutland Funen Foreign interventions: Sweden Prussia Supported by: Norwegian nobles Duchy of Guelders

Commanders and leaders
Christian II; Skipper Clement (executed); Jørgen Kock; Christopher of Oldenburg; Jürgen Wullenwever	Christian III; Niels Brock; Johan Rantzau; Holger Rosenkrantz; Peder Skram; Gustav I Vasa; Lars Sparre; Måns Some; Johan Pein

The Count's Feud (Danish: Grevens Fejde), sometimes referred to as the Count's War, was a Danish war of succession occurring from 1534 to 1536, which gave rise to the Reformation in Denmark. In the broader international context, it was a part of the European wars of religion. The Count's Feud derives its name from the Protestant count, Christopher of Oldenburg, who championed the claim to the throne of the deposed Catholic king, Christian II (who was forced from power in 1523), rejecting Christian III's election. Christian III was a devoted protestant who had already established Lutheranism as the state religion in Schleswig and Holstein by 1528.

== Background ==
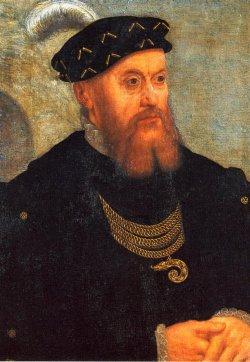
King Christian III

After Frederick I's death in 1533, the Jutland nobility proclaimed his son, then Duke Christian of Gottorp, as king under the name Christian III. Meanwhile, Count Christopher, or Christoffer, organized an uprising against the new king, demanding that Christian II be set free. Supported by troops from Oldenburg and Mecklenburg, parts of the Zealand and Skåne nobilities rose up, together with cities such as Copenhagen and Malmø. Under Jürgen Wullenwever, the city of Lübeck offered to finance Christoffer as long as he restricted Dutch shipping from accessing the Danish straits, and later used its considerable navy to provide direct support.

The violence began in 1534, when a privateer captain who had earlier been in Christian II's service, Klemen Andersen, called Skipper Clement, at Count Christoffer's request instigated the peasants of Vendsyssel and North Jutland to rise up against the nobles. The headquarters for the revolt came to be in Aalborg. A large number of manors were burned down in northern and western Jutland. On 10 August 1534, Count Christoffer accepted Skåne for Christian II's rule. The month before, Christoffer was heralded as regent on Christian II's behalf by the Zealand Council in Ringsted.

== Battles of Svenstrup and Aalborg ==
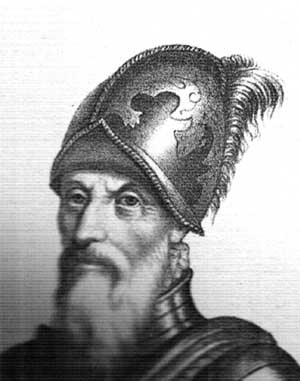
Johan Rantzau

An army of nobles under the leadership of Niels Brock and Holger Rosenkrantz was defeated at the Battle of Svenstrup on 16 October 1534. Christian III, in the meantime, forced a peace with Lübeck, from which great reinforcements could be freed up to fight against the rebels. Under the leadership of Johan Rantzau, the royal troops pursued the peasants all the way to Aalborg, where the peasants, under the leadership of Skipper Clement, had taken refuge behind the city's fortifications.

On 18 December, Rantzau's troops stormed the city, and it fell. At least 2,000 people are thought to have lost their lives in the storming of the city and in the plundering of the following days. For his part, Skipper Clement, badly wounded, managed to escape. A few days later he was recognized by a peasant in Storvorde east of Aalborg and handed over to Rantzau. Skipper Clement was later sentenced to death by the judicial council in Viborg and executed in 1536.

== Battles of Helsingborg and Øksnebjerg ==
Fortune did not fare well for the rebelling supporters of the Catholic faith, nor for the farmers on the Swedish front. The Swedish King Gustav Vasa sent a Swedish army to the aid of Christian III, which invaded Skåne at Loshult and plundered, burned, and murdered their way throughout the Gønge area as it advanced toward the town of Væ. Later, a Swedish army invaded Halland, which was destroyed by fire and sword. Some of the Scanian nobles sided with the Swedes, but Tyge Krabbe in Helsingborg Castle supported Count Christoffer.

In January 1535, the Swedes and the army of nobles advanced on Helsingborg. An army consisting of residents of Lübeck and Malmø under Jørgen Kock was entrenched outside of the castle. In a decisive moment, Tyge Krabbe suddenly had the castle's cannons open fire against its defenders, after which he opened the castle to the Swedes, who set fire to Helsingborg and reduced the town to ashes. With that, Denmark east of the Sound was lost for Count Christoffer.

After the victory at Aalborg, Rantzau brought his troops to Funen. On 11 June 1535, they fought the Battle of Øksnebjerg, where the rest of Count Christoffer's army was decisively defeated. Both Copenhagen and Malmø were able to hold out until 1536, when they were forced to capitulate after several months' siege. With this, the Count's Feud was officially over.

== Aftermath ==
In the aftermath of the feud, the nobles regrouped and healed the rifts the usual way, through inter-marriage. One of the most powerful among the Danish nobility in Skåne at this time was the Bille family, who were tied through blood relations to seven of the eight Catholic bishops of Denmark. The Billes also had six family members on the Council of the Realm, and owned castles throughout Denmark and Norway.

In order to keep the family's powerful position, in spite of the religious affiliation with the Catholic faith, Claus Bille, of Stockholm Bloodbath fame, second cousin to Gustav Vasa, protected the family by forming a political alliance through marriage with the Brahe family, another powerful Scanian family among the Danish nobility at this time. The Brahe family was one of the first among the nobility to convert to Lutheranism.

Claus Bille gave his 18-year-old daughter Beate in marriage to Otte Brahe, and became a grandfather in 1546 to the perhaps most famous Scanian of the era, the astronomer Tyge Brahe, better known as Tycho Brahe. Tycho Brahe's paternal grandfather, who he was named after, Tyge Brahe of Tosterup in eastern Skåne, was killed 7 September 1523 during the siege of Malmø, fighting for Frederick I. Axel Brahe, the brother of the older Tyge Brahe, served as governor of Scania for a long period, and was one of the first to convert to Lutheranism.

In contrast, the consequences of the peasant uprising cost all parties dearly. Many were forced to purchase their lives with great gifts both to the king and to the nobles. The dissatisfactions of the peasants, which had culminated in the uprising of the Count's Feud, were only made worse, as the nobility began to stick together even more after this incident. Christian III's rule, ushered in by this war, saw the rise of royal absolutism in Denmark, and, with it, greater repression of the peasant classes.

Jürgen Wullenwever was ejected from Lübeck, which has been plunged into permanent decline by the war, and would be tortured and executed at Wolfenbüttel in 1537. The city of Hamburg, which opened free trade with the Dutch even in the Eighty Years' War, rose in influence comparatively.

Another consequence of the feud was that Christian III successfully orchestrated an invasion of Norway in 1537, and incorporated the country as a puppet kingdom under Denmark, instead of an equal kingdom as it was in the Kalmar Union. The Catholic clergy in Norway, which was mainly Norwegian, were replaced by priests under Christian III organization and control.

An important consequence not sufficiently appreciated by Danes at the time was the introduction of a Swedish army into Skåne. Though in this case the Swedes came at the invitation of a Danish king to help subdue his rebellious subjects and duly handed over to the king the territory which they conquered, it had a clear effect of whetting Swedish appetite to gain the territory for themselves, which was manifested in a long series of subsequent wars culminating with its ultimate cessation to Sweden in 1658.

== List of battles ==
- Battle of Svenstrup – 16 October 1534
- Storming of Aalborg – 18 December 1534
- Battle of Helsingborg (Kernen) – 12 January 1535
- Battle of Øksnebjerg – 11 June 1535
- Siege of Copenhagen (1535–1535) — 29 July 1535 – 14 February 1536
- Battle of Little Belt – 16 June 1535
- Battle of Bornholm (1535) – 9 July 1535
- Battle of Heiligerlee – 5 August 1536

== In popular culture ==
The science fiction novel The Corridors of Time by Poul Anderson — an American of Danish origin, whose work often includes themes from Danish and Scandinavian history — includes a vivid description of Jutland in the immediate aftermath of the Count's Feud and the continuing struggle by hunted diehard rebels, as seen by a time-traveller from the 20th century.

== See also ==
- History of Denmark
- Skåneland
- Christian II of Denmark
- Frederick I of Denmark
- Christian III of Denmark

== Other sources ==
- Thoren, Victor E.; Christianson, John Robert (1991). The Lord of Uraniborg: A Biography of Tycho Brahe. Cambridge University Press. ISBN 0-521-35158-8.
