= Hovedgård =

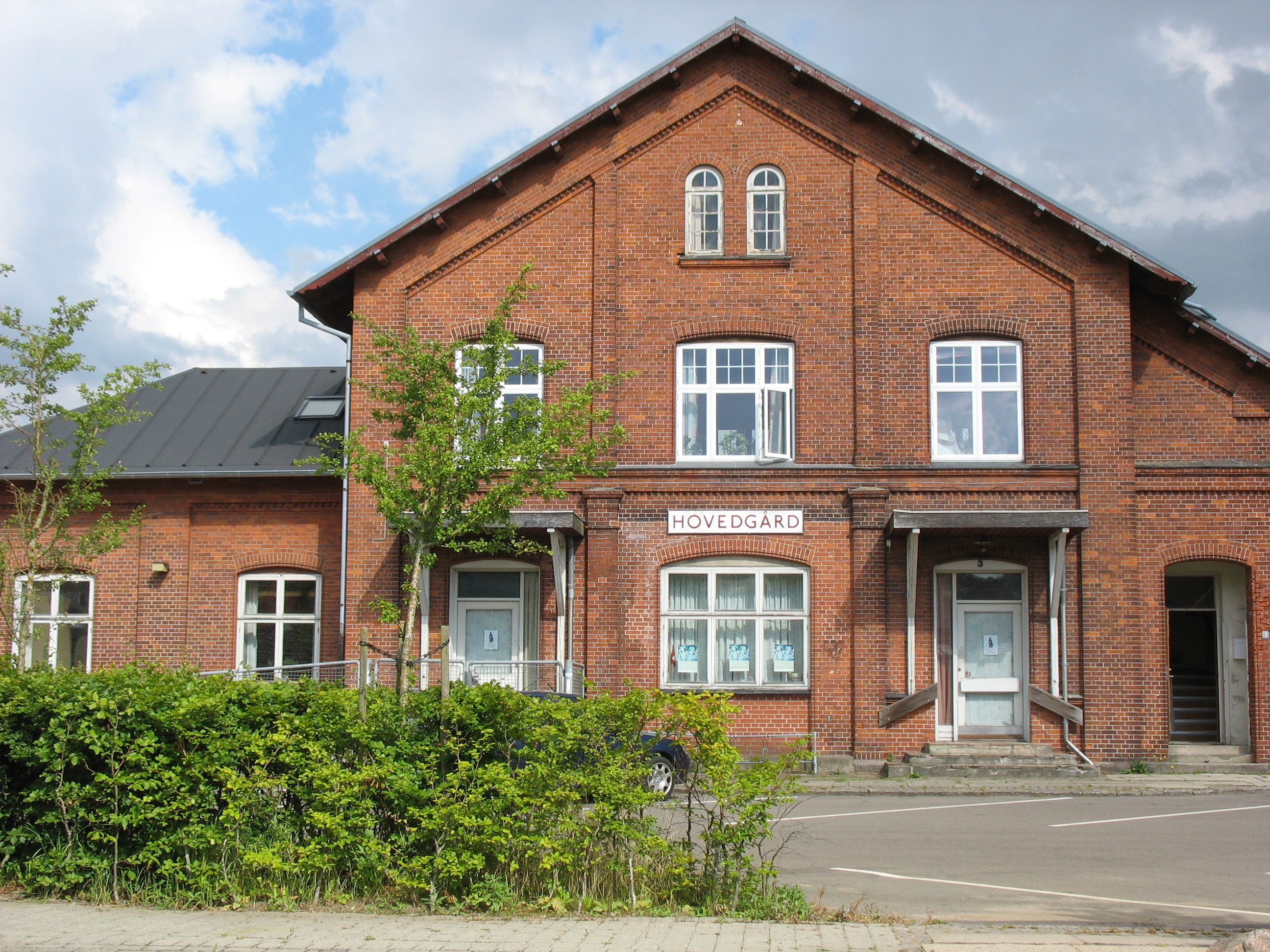
- Hovedgård Station

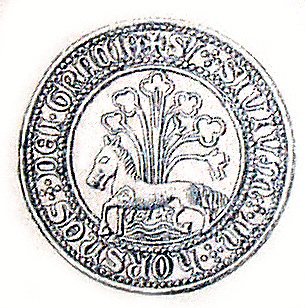
- Seal Coat of arms

- Location in Denmark Hovedgård (Central Denmark Region)
- Coordinates: 55°56′43″N 09°57′36″E
- Country: Denmark
- Region: Mid Jutland (Midtjylland)
- Municipality: Horsens
- Founded: 12th century

Area
  - Urban: 1.7 km^{2} (0.66 sq mi)
- Elevation: 5 m (16 ft)

Population (1 January 2026)
  - Urban: 2,335
  - Urban density: 1,400/km^{2} (3,600/sq mi)
- Postal code: 8732
- Area code: (+45) 7
- Website: www.hovedgaard.dk

Hovedgård is a town in East Jutland with a population of 2,335 (2026), located in the Central Jutland Region, part of Horsens Municipality. The town is located in Ørridslev Parish. Previously, Hovedgård was a railway town between Skanderborg and Horsens.

The town is in all probability named after the manor of Great Hovedgård which is close by. Inside the town you will find Tornbjerg Wood. A few kilometers to the southwest is Ørridslev church, which dates from the 12th century. Hovedgård has an active community and club environment and is particularly known for its music. Hovedgård School Orchestra celebrated its 50th anniversary in 2012.

The town is located 13 kilometers north of Horsens, 16 kilometers south of Skanderborg and 35 kilometers southwest of Aarhus.

== History ==
In 1682, the manor of Hovedgård consisted of two farms. The total cultivated area was 91.8 barrels of land owed to 18.89 barrels of hart grain. The railway station opened around 1868.

In 1879, the conditions are described as follows: " Great Hovegaard with brickworks and railway station... Hoved-Inn by the old Horsens-Aarhus Road". In fact, the station was next to the inn.

Around the turn of the century, the town is referred to as follows: " Hovedgaard- (Upper- and Lower), railway town next to the country road, with elementary school, Realskole (founded 1901), doctor's practice, brickworks, several merchants and craftsmen, inn, railway and telegraph and Post Office. " Hovedgård had 387 inhabitants in 1906, 464 in 1911 and 485 inhabitants in 1916.

During the interwar period and after World War II, Hovedgård's development was modest: in 1921 the town had 602 inhabitants, in 1930 689, in 1940 649, in 1950 610, in 1960 687 inhabitants and in 1965 855 inhabitants.

In 1930, the town had by occupation: 81 residents worked in agriculture, 273 in industry and crafts, 102 in trade, 65 in transport, 37 in business, 71 in housework, 48 were out of occupation and 12 had not provided information.

== New railway between Hovedgård and Hasselager ==
A new, shorter high-speed railway line was going to be built between Aarhus station and Horsens via Hasselager and Hovedgård. The section was going to be 23–24 km long and thus would reduce the current track length by approx. 6 kilometers to cut six minutes off travelling times. The project was going to cost 3.3 billion DKK and the final decision on alignment was expected in 2018. In 2023, it was reported that there was no longer a political majority for the project.

== Bibliography ==
- Henrik Pedersen: Danish agricultural manufacturing on the basis of the preparatory work for Christian V.'s Land Registry 1688. Published after his death at the expense of the Carlsberg Foundation (København MCMXXVIII; Reprotryk for Landbohistorisk Selskab, København 1975), ISBN 87-7526-056-5
