= Horsens Municipality =

Horsens Municipality Horsens Kommune (Danish)
- Municipality
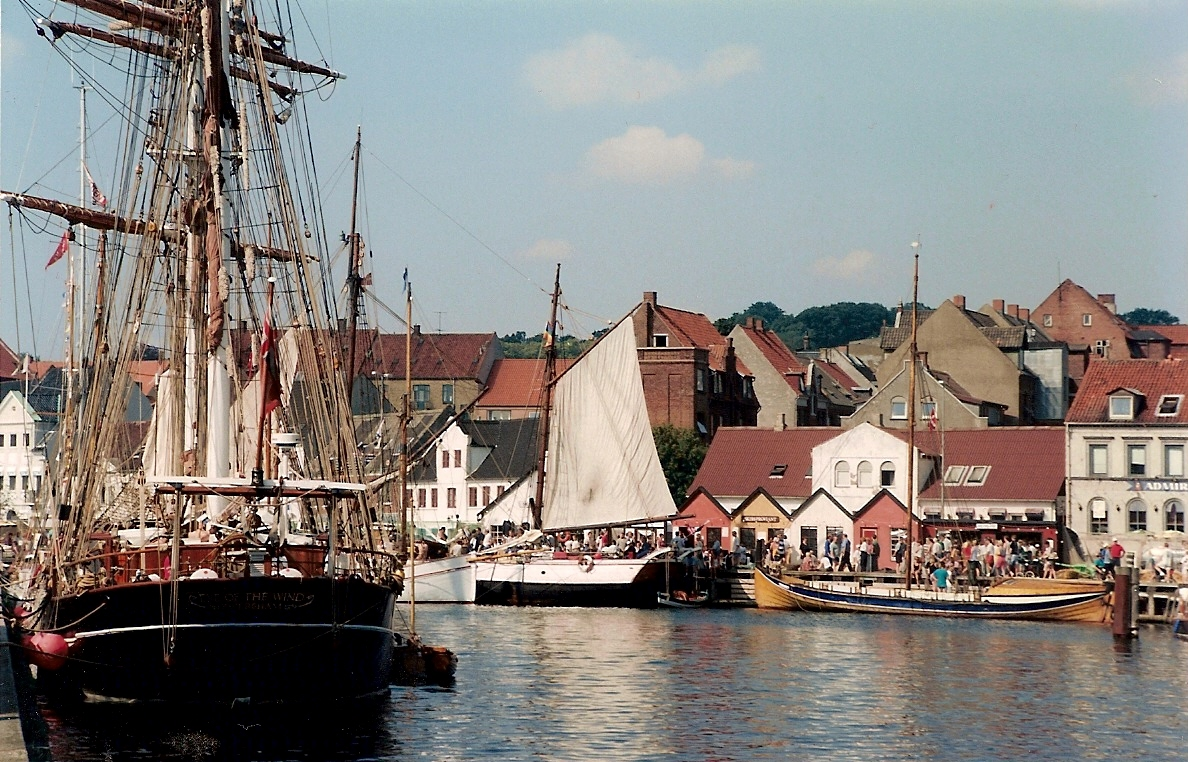

- Flag Coat of arms

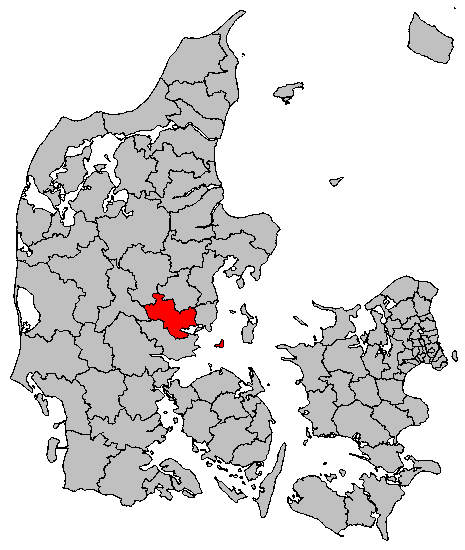
- Location in Denmark
- Coordinates: 55°52′N 9°50′E
- Country: Denmark
- Region: Central Denmark
- Established: 1 January 2007

Government
  - Mayor: Peter Sørensen

Area
  - Total: 515.2 km^{2} (198.9 sq mi)

Population (1 January 2026)
  - Total: 98,806
  - Density: 191.8/km^{2} (496.7/sq mi)
- Time zone: UTC+1 (CET)
  - Summer (DST): UTC+2 (CEST)
- Postal code: 8700
- Website: horsens.dk

Horsens Municipality (Danish: Horsens Kommune) is a municipality (Danish: kommune) in Region Midtjylland on the east coast of the Jutland peninsula in central Denmark. The municipality includes the island of Endelave, and covers an area of 515.2 km^{2}. It has a population of 98,806 (2026). Its mayor is Peter Sørensen, a member of the Social Democratic party. The main town and the site of its municipal council is the city of Horsens.

== History ==
The municipality was created in 1970 due to a kommunalreform ("Municipal Reform") that combined the city of Horsens with a number of existing parishes:

- Endelave Parish
- Hansted Parish
- Hatting Parish
- Kloster Parish
- Lundum Parish
- Nebel Parish
- Sønderbro Parish
- Tamdrup Parish
- Torsted Parish
- Tyrsted Parish
- Uth Parish
- Vær Parish

On 1 January 2007 Horsens Municipality was, as the result of the Municipal Reform of 2007, merged with existing Brædstrup (except for Voerladegård Parish) and Gedved municipalities to form a new Horsens municipality.

The municipality is part of Business Region Aarhus and of the East Jutland metropolitan area, which had a total population of 1.378 million in 2016.

== Geography ==
In the northern part of Horsens municipality near the town of Yding, the second highest natural point of terrain in Denmark, namely Yding Skovhøj at 170.77 metres (560.27 ft), is situated, immediately west of the highest and third-highest points of natural terrain in Skanderborg municipality.

=== Locations ===
Horsens	63,200
Brædstrup	4,000
Lund	3,200
Egebjerg	3,000
Østbirk	2,600
Gedved	2,400
Hovedgård	2,300
Hatting	1,900
Søvind	1,000

== Politics ==
=== Municipal council ===
Horsens' municipal council consists of 27 members, elected every four years.

Below are the municipal councils elected since the Municipal Reform of 2007.

Election	Party									Total seats	Turnout	Elected mayor
Election	A	B	C	D	F	I	O	V	Ø	Total seats	Turnout	Elected mayor
2005	16		2		1		1	11		31	69.0%	Jan Trøjborg (A)
2009	12		1		3	1	2	8		27	62.3%	Jan Trøjborg (A)
2013	13		1		1	1	3	7	1	27	70.5%	Peter Sørensen (A)
2017	13		1		1	1	3	7	1	27	68.5%	Peter Sørensen (A)
2021	12	1	3	1	1		1	7	1	27	63.8%	Peter Sørensen (A)
Data from Kmdvalg.dk 2005, 2009, 2013, 2017 and 2021

== Notable people ==
- Peder Skram (ca.1503 in Urup - 1581) a Danish Admiral and naval hero
- Søren Frich (1827 in Nim Parish, Bolund manor – 1901) a Danish engineer, factory owner and city Councillor who built the Frichs company in Aarhus
- Mary Westenholz (1857 in Mattrup – 1947) an influential Danish Unitarian, women's rights activist, writer and editor
- Anders Christian Jensen-Haarup (1863 in Nim – 1934) a Danish entomologist who specialised in Hymenoptera
- Brian Priske (14. 5. 1977 - ) coach of the football team Sparta Prague - league champion 2022/2023

== Sources ==
- Municipal statistics: NetBorger Kommunefakta, delivered from KMD aka Kommunedata (Municipal Data)
- Municipal mergers and neighbors: Eniro new municipalities map
- Printable/searchable municipal maps: Krak mapsearch(outline visible but doesn't print out!)
