= Gedved =

- Town
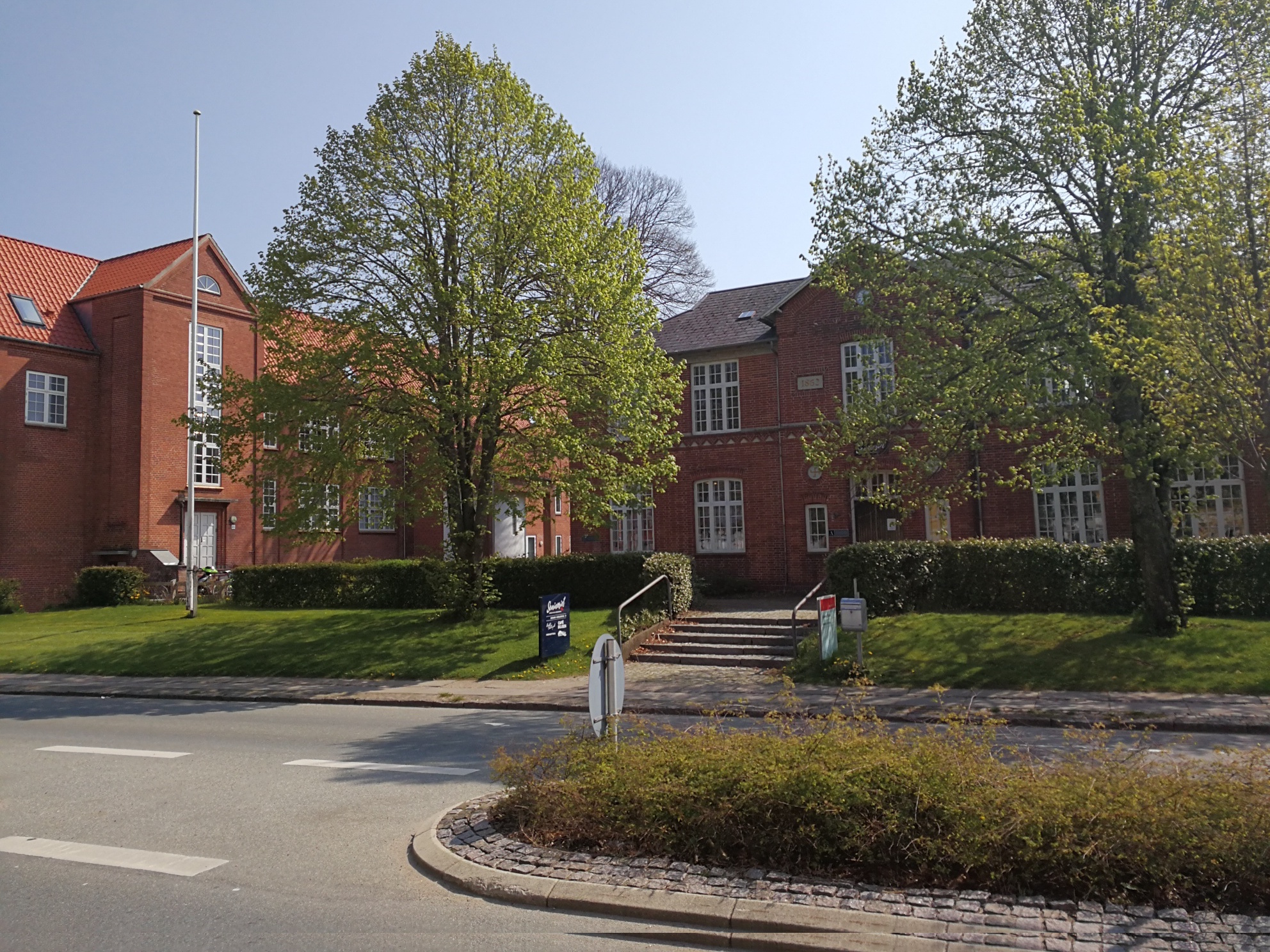

- Location in Denmark Gedved (Central Denmark Region)
- Coordinates: 55°55′51″N 9°50′50″E
- Country: Denmark
- Region: Region Midtjylland
- Municipality: Horsens Municipality

Area
  - Urban: 2 km^{2} (0.77 sq mi)

Population (2026)
  - Urban: 2,475
  - Urban density: 1,200/km^{2} (3,200/sq mi)
- Time zone: UTC+1 (CET)
  - Summer (DST): UTC+2 (CEST)
- Postal code: DK-8751 Gedved

Gedved is a small town with a population of 2,475 (1 January 2026), in Horsens Municipality located between Skanderborg and Horsens in the middle eastern Jutland in Denmark's Region Midtjylland.

Gedved is one of the fastest-growing towns in Denmark, with a 30% increase in population since 2006.

== Notable people ==
- Sigrid Neiiendam (1873 in Gedved – 1955) a Danish actress who played some 200 parts at the Royal Danish Theatre
- Charlotte Jakobsen (born 1981 in Gedved) a Danish sports shooter
