= Peder Skram =

Danish naval officer

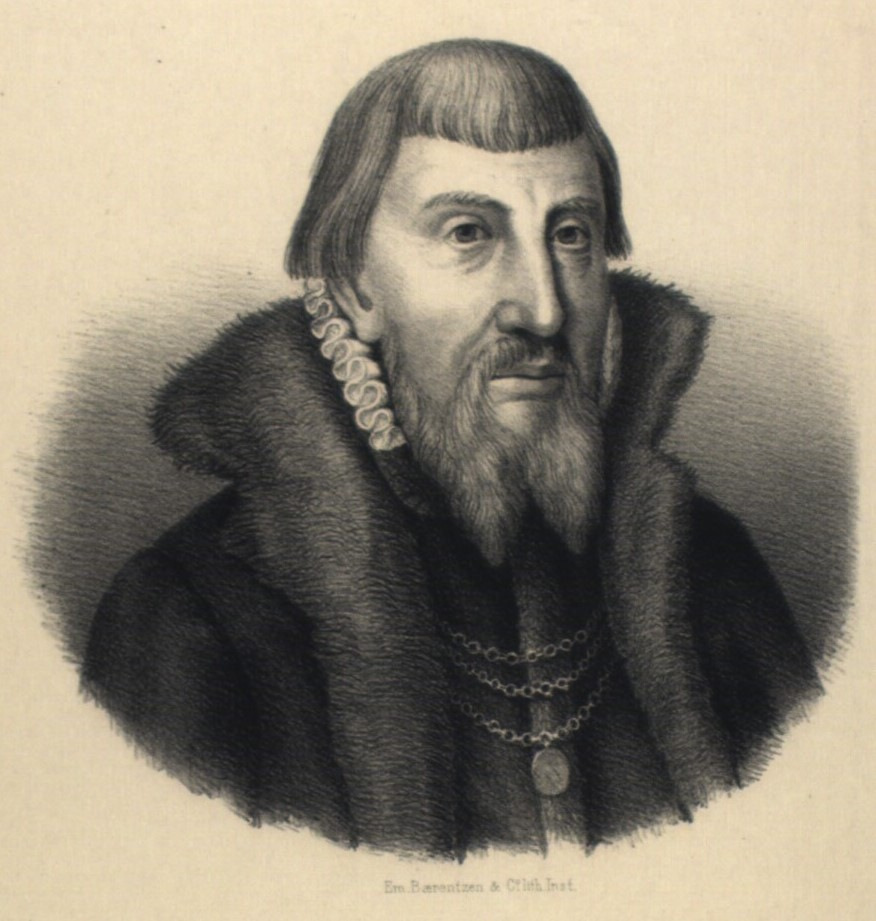
- Portrait of Peder Skram by unknown artist
- Born: Between 1491 and 1503; Horsens, Denmark
- Died: 11 July 1581 (aged 78-90); Horsens, Denmark
- Military career
- Allegiance: Denmark
- Branch: Royal Danish Navy
- Service years: 1518–1562
- Rank: Admiral
- Nickname: Denmark's Dare-devil

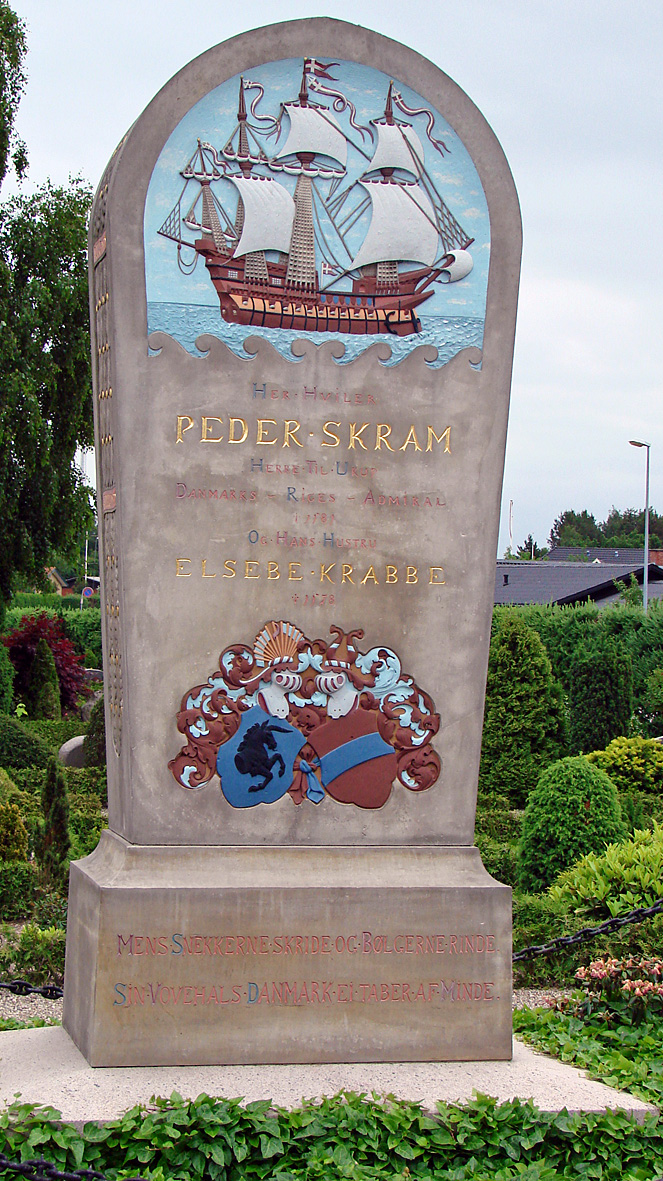
Peder Skram memorial at Østbirk Church

Peder Skram (died 11 July 1581) was a Danish naval officer.

== Biography ==
Skram was born between 1491 and 1503, on his father's estate at Urup near Horsens in Jutland, Denmark. He participated in military service during the Swedish War of Liberation in the service of King Christian II. He first saw service in the Swedish war at the Battle of Brännkyrka during 1518. In 1521 during the Battle of Uppsala, he prevented the capture of Danish nobleman Mogens Gyldenstierne. For his services in this war he was rewarded with an estate, where he settled for a time with his young consort Elsebe Krabbe, daughter of nobleman Tyge Krabbe (ca. 1474–1541).

During the Count's Feud (Danish: Grevens fejde), Skram was sent by the Danish government to assist Gustavus Vasa, then in alliance with Christian III against the partisans of Christian II, to organize the untried Swedish fleet. Although the point is still obscure, Skram seems to have shared the chief command with Swedish Admiral Mans Some. Skram greatly hampered the movements of the Hanseatic fleets who fought on the side of Christian II; captured a whole Lübeck squadron off Svendborg, and prevented the attack on Copenhagen by Lübeck. But the incurable suspicion of Gustavus Vasa minimized the successes of the allied fleets throughout 1535. Skram's services were richly rewarded by Christian III, who knighted him at his coronation, granted him a seat on the Council of State and endowed him with ample estates.

In 1555 feeling too infirm to go to sea, he resigned his post of admiral; but when the Scandinavian Seven Years' War broke out seven years later; and the new king, Frederick II, offered Skram the chief command, he agreed to go. With a large fleet he put to sea in August 1562 and compelled the Swedish admiral, after a successful engagement off the coast of Gotland, to take refuge behind the Skerries. However, this was his sole achievement and he was superseded at the end of the year by Admiral Herluf Trolle.

Skram then retired from active service to his estate at Laholm in Halland, which was twice (1565–1568) unsuccessfully besieged by the Swedes and died at Urup on 11 July 1581. He is buried at Østbirk Church, which was once part of Urup estate in Horsens.

== Other sources ==
- Briand de Crèvecoeur, Emmanuel (1950) Peder Skram, Danmarks Vovehals (København : Gyldendal)

== Related reading ==
- Larsen, Alex (1893) Dansk-Norske Heltehistorier (København : J. Jørgensen & Co. )
