= List of shipwrecks in December 1858 =

The list of shipwrecks in December 1858 includes ships sunk, foundered, wrecked, grounded, or otherwise lost during December 1858.

== 1 December ==
List of shipwrecks: 1 December 1858
Ship	State	Description
Countess of Caithness	United Kingdom	The ship was driven ashore at Arnish Point, Isle of Lewis, Outer Hebrides. She was on a voyage from Stornoway, Isle of Lewis to Belfast, County Antrim. She was refloated and beached at Stornoway.
Euclid	United Kingdom	The ship was lost near Cape San Antonio, Cuba. She was on a voyage from Belize City, British Honduras to Queenstown, County Cork.
Falcon	United Kingdom	The schooner ran aground on the Herd Sand, in the North Sea off the coast of County Durham. She was refloated with the aid of a tug and resumed her voyage.
Genova, and Good Speed	United Kingdom	The steamship Genova collided with Good Speed in the River Mersey and was beached at the Rock Lighthouse. All on board were rescued She was on a voyage from Liverpool, Lancashire to London. She was refloated on 6 December and beached. She was taken in to Liverpool on 9 December. Good Speed was beached at Tranmere, Cheshire. She was on a voyage from Mobile, Alabama, United States to Liverpool.
Hope	United Kingdom	The ship ran aground and was wrecked on the Nidingen Reef, in the Baltic Sea off the coast of Sweden. She was on a voyage from Kronstadt, Russia to Hull, Yorkshire.
Meteor Flag	United Kingdom	The ship was driven ashore and wrecked in Sheephaven Bay. She was on a voyage from Pictou, Nova Scotia, British North America to the Clyde.
Rommerig	Norway	The barque was abandoned in the North Sea. Her crew were rescued by Fanny (United Kingdom). She was on a voyage from Sundsvall to London, United Kingdom. She was taken in to "Rosavag", Norway the next day.
Wearmouth	United Kingdom	The steamship was driven ashore in the River Thames at Coalhouse Fort, Essex .

== 2 December ==
List of shipwrecks: 2 December 1858
Ship	State	Description
Ann	United Kingdom	The brigantine was abandoned off Eagle Head, County Donegal. Her crew were rescued by Alphonsine (France). Ann was on a voyage from Brăila, Ottoman Empire to an English port.
Earl of Seafield	United Kingdom	The ship driven ashore at the mouth of the "Yrten River". She was on a voyage from Inverkeithing, Fife to the "Newburgh Creek".
Hennatope	(United Kingdom of Great Britain and Ireland) Jersey	The ship was driven ashore at Fort Puntales, Cádiz, Spain.
Lavinia	United Kingdom	The schooner caught fire and sank off the Rammekins Castle, Vlissingen, Zeeland, Netherlands. Her crew survived. She was refloated the next day and towed in to Vlissingen.

== 3 December ==
List of shipwrecks: 3 December 1858
Ship	State	Description
Annie	United Kingdom	The ship was abandoned in the Atlantic Ocean. She was on a voyage from Saint John, New Brunswick, British North America to Liverpool, Lancashire.
Marchioness of Ailsa	United Kingdom	The ship was wrecked near Troon, Ayrshire. She was on a voyage from Troon to Demerara, British Guiana.
Souvenir	France	The brig ran ashore south of Carteret, Manche. She was on a voyage from Montevideo to Havre de Grâce, Seine-Inférieure.

== 4 December ==
List of shipwrecks: 4 December 1858
Ship	State	Description
Caledonia	United Kingdom	The ship was wrecked at Lisbon, Portugal. She was on a voyage from Cardiff, Glamorgan to Maranhão, Brazil.
Casket	United Kingdom	The brig was wrecked on a reef off Puerto Plata, Dominican Republic.
Drake	United Kingdom	The ship was driven ashore at Corton, Suffolk. She was refloated and taken in to Great Yarmouth, Norfolk in a severely leaky condition.
Dnieper	Russia	The steamship was wrecked near Gallipoli, Ottoman Empire with the loss of five or six of her crew. She was on a voyage from an English port to Constantinople, Ottoman Empire.
Gertrude	United Kingdom	The steamship ran aground on the Vorgeburger Kullen, in the Baltic Sea. She was on a voyage from Leith, Lothian to Stettin. She was refloated and taken in to Stettin in a leaky condition.
Liberty	United Kingdom	The brig ran aground on the Holme Sand, in the North Sea off the coast of Suffolk and was wrecked. Her crew were rescued. She was on a voyage from Sunderland, County Durham to Lowestoft, Suffolk She was on a voyage from Sunderland, County Durham to London.
Madagascar	United Kingdom	The ship ran aground and was wrecked on a reef near the mouth of the Bira River near East London, Cape Colony.
Spring	United Kingdom	The ship ran aground on the Barber Sand, in the North Sea off the coast of Suffolk. She was then run into by the schooner Courier (Hamburg). Pallas was on a voyage from Montrose, Forfarshire to London.
Vrouw Jantje	Kingdom of Hanover	The ship was driven ashore on Terschelling, Friesland, Netherlands. She was on a voyage from "Rautsepehn" to London.
Widar	Sweden	The brig was driven ashore on Gotland. She was on a voyage from Saint Petersburg, Russia to Leith, Lothian, United Kingdom. She was refloated and taken in to "Bohnehamn".
Willing Mind	United Kingdom	The brig was run ashore and wrecked at Flamborough Head, East Riding of Yorkshire. She was on a voyage from South Shields, County Durham to London.

== 5 December ==
List of shipwrecks: 5 December 1858
Ship	State	Description
Corymbus	United Kingdom	The schooner ran aground on the Goodwin Sands, Kent and was abandoned by her five crew. She was on a voyage from Leith, Lothian, to Dieppe, Seine-Inférieure, France. She was refloated and taken in to Calais, France the next day in a derelict condition.
Jessy	United Kingdom	The ship ran aground on the Barber Sand, in the North Sea off the coast of Norfolk. She was on a voyage from Cardiff, Glamorgan to Leith, Lothian. She was refloated and taken in to Great Yarmouth, Norfolk in a leaky condition.
Oostzee	Netherlands	The ship was abandoned in the Atlantic Ocean (49°14′N 15°00′W). Her crew were rescued by Bostonian (United States). Oostzee was on a voyage from Rotterdam, South Holland to Philadelphia, Pennsylvania, United States.
Science	United Kingdom	The ship was abandoned in the Atlantic Ocean. Her crew were rescued by St. Patrick (United Kingdom). Science was on a voyage from Buenos Aires, Argentina to Liverpool, Lancashire. She subsequently came ashore in Castles Bay and was wrecked.
Uskermunde	Stettin	The ship was beached at a port near Egersund, Norway. She was on a voyage from Hartlepool, County Durham, United Kingdom to Stettin.

== 6 December ==
List of shipwrecks: 6 December 1858
Ship	State	Description
Belle Anais	France	The ship capsized at Dunkirk, Nord.
Commodore	United Kingdom	The ship was in collision with a brig and sank in the River Thames. She was on a voyage from Kilrush, County Clare to London.
Corymbus	United Kingdom	The ship was taken in to Calais in a derelict condition.
Eider	Bremen	The brigantine ran aground on the Bolder Bank, in the English Channel off the coast of Sussex, United Kingdom. She was on a voyage from San Antonio to Bremen. She was refloated and taken in to Newhaven, Sussex.
Fairy Queen	United Kingdom	The ship foundered off Syracuse, Sicily. Her crew were rescued by Due Fratelli ( Kingdom of the Two Sicilies). Fairy Queen was on a voyage from Alexandria, Egypt to Liverpool, Lancashire.
Gem	United Kingdom	The smack was run down and sunk in the North Sea 2 nautical miles (3.7 km) north of the Mouse Lightship ( Trinity House) by the steamship Berwick (United Kingdom). Her crew were rescued. She was on a voyage from Sunderland, County Durham to London.
Gustav	Sweden	The schooner was driven ashore and wrecked at Eckerö, Åland, Grand Duchy of Finland. She was on a voyage from Härnösand to London.
Jane and Sarah	United Kingdom	The smack driven ashore in Caernarvon Bay. She was on a voyage from Charlestown, Cornwall to Liverpool, Lancashire. She was refloated on 4 January 1859.
Johannes	Stettin	The ship was driven ashore and wrecked at Alt Skagen, Denmark. She was on a voyage from Middlesbrough, Yorkshire, United Kingdom to Stettin.
Madagascar	United Kingdom	The steamship ran aground on a reef and was consequently beached at the mouth of the Beka River. All on board survived. She was on a voyage from East London to Algoa Bay, Cape Colony.
Rose of the West	United Kingdom	The ship was wrecked at Tortola, Virgin Islands.
Scalby	United Kingdom	The schooner was driven ashore on Inishbofin, County Donegal. Her crew were rescued. She was a total loss.

== 7 December ==
List of shipwrecks: 7 December 1858
Ship	State	Description
Commandeur	Belgium	The ship was driven ashore at Dungeness, Kent, United Kingdom. She was on a voyage from Antwerp to Rio de Janeiro, Brazil. She was refloated on 9 December and taken in to Ramsgate, Kent.
Cuatro Hermanos	Spain	The brig was driven ashore and sank at Dungeness. She was on a voyage from Antwerpto Havana, Cuba.
USRC McLelland	United States Revenue Cutter Service	The cutter ran aground at Mobile, Alabama whilst attempting to prevent the schooner Susan (United States) from leaving port with 188 of Walker's filibusters on board.

== 8 December ==
List of shipwrecks: 8 December 1858
Ship	State	Description
Active	United Kingdom	The ship sprang a leak and sank in the Irish Sea 2.5 nautical miles (4.6 km) off Holyhead, Anglesey. Her crew were rescued. She was on a voyage from Garston, Lancashire to Padstow, Cornwall.
Alexandre	France	The barque ran aground on the Haisborough Sands, in the North Sea off the coast of Norfolk, United Kingdom. She was on a voyage from Sunderland, County Durham, United Kingdom to Bordeaux, Gironde. Alexandre was refloated and towed in to Lowestoft, Suffolk, United Kingdom in a leaky condition.
Alice	United States	The full-rigged ship was driven ashore at Charleston, South Carolina. She was on a voyage from Charleston to Trieste. She was refloated with assistance from the steamship Aid (United Kingdom) and resumed her voyage.
Amelia	Spain	The schooner foundered off the coast of Cantabria with the loss of most of her crew.
Ardent	United Kingdom	The ship struck a reef and sank 10 nautical miles (19 km) south of Aberystwyth, Cardiganshire. Her crew were rescued.
Armanilla	United Kingdom	The schooner sprang a leak and foundered off the coast of County Antrim. Her cre were rescued. She was on a voyage from Workington, Cumberland to the Belfast Lough.
Cora	United Kingdom	The steamship was wrecked at Pernambuco, Brazil. Her crew were rescued. She was on a voyage from London to Pernambuco.
Courier	Russia	The ship ran aground on the Haisborough Sands. She was on a voyage from Saint Petersburg to London, United Kingdom. She was refloated and taken in tow for London.
Friendship	United Kingdom	The schooner was beached at Clovelly, Devon. she was on a voyage from Porthcawl, Glamorgan to Plymouth, Devon.
Lucie Antoinette	France	The brigantine was discovered derelict in the Bristol Channel. She was taken in to Tenby, Pembrokeshire, United Kingdom by a pilot boat.
Marianne	United Kingdom	The barque was abandoned in the Atlantic Ocean. Her crew were rescued by Martha Ridout (United Kingdom). Marianne was on a voyage from Quebec City, Province of Canada, British North America to Grangemouth, Stirlingshire. She was towed in to Queenstown, County Cork in a waterlogged condition on 15 January 1859.
Minerva	United Kingdom	The brig ran aground on the Gunfleet Sand, in the North Sea off the coast of Essex. She was on a voyage from London to Sunderland. She was refloated the next day with the assistance of four smacks and resumed her voyage.
Pelican	United Kingdom	The steamship ran aground near Hellevoetsluis, Zeeland, Netherlands. She was refloated on 9 December.
Roberts	United Kingdom	The ship foundered off the coast of Galicia, Spain. Her crew were rescued.
San Ignacio	Spain	The schooner foundered off the coast of Cantabria.

== 9 December ==
List of shipwrecks: 9 December 1858
Ship	State	Description
Adelaide Prendergast	United Kingdom	The ship was beached at Youghal, County Cork. Her crew were rescued. She was on a voyage from Porthcawl, Glamorgan to Youghal.
Felicity	United Kingdom	The brig was wrecked on the Northern Burrows, off the north coast of Devon. Her seven crew were rescued by the Appledore Lifeboat.
Gulf Stream	United States	The three-masted schooner sprang a leak and sank in the Irish Sea 60 nautical miles (110 km) south west of Milford Haven, Pembrokeshire, United Kingdom. Her crew were rescued by the barque Constellation (United Kingdom). Gulf Stream was on a voyage from Newport, Monmouthshire, United Kingdom to Martinique.
Marie Antoinette	France	The ship collided with Alliance (United Kingdom) and foundered in the Bristol Channel with the loss of one of her six crew.
Thistle	United Kingdom	The paddle steamer was driven ashore at Raghly Point, County Sligo. She was on a voyage from Glasgow, Renfrewshire to Sligo. She broke up on 20 December.

== 10 December ==
List of shipwrecks: 10 December 1858
Ship	State	Description
Lucas	United States	The ship was wrecked on the coast of California with the loss of twenty lives.
Sophie	France	The ship was in collision with Sylph (United Kingdom) and sank off St. Ives, Cornwall, United Kingdom. Her crew were rescued. She was on a voyage from Swansea, Glamorgan, United Kingdom to Rochefort, Charente-Inférieure.
Vixen	United Kingdom	The schooner was driven ashore at Campbeltown, Argyllshire. She was on a voyage from Troon, Ayrshire to Limerick.

== 11 December ==
List of shipwrecks: 11 December 1858
Ship	State	Description
Cornubia	United Kingdom	The brigantine ran aground on The Manacles. She was on a voyage from Southampton, Hampshire to Port Talbot, Glamorgan. She was refloated and put in to Falmouth, Cornwall in a leaky condition.

== 12 December ==
List of shipwrecks: 12 December 1858
Ship	State	Description
Alwine	Hamburg	The ship was wrecked on the Laffolle Reefs, east of the Île-à-Vache, Haiti., She was on a voyage from Grimsby, Lincolnshire, United Kingdom to Aux Cayes, Haiti.
Herman	United Kingdom	The ship collided with HMS Firefly or HMS Sandfly (both Royal Navy) and sank in the North Sea off the Dudgeon Lightship ( Trinity House).
Lion	United Kingdom	The brig was driven ashore at the mouth of the River Don, Aberdeenshire. Her ten crew were rescued. She was on a voyage from Sunderland, County Durham to Aberdeen.
Louis Amelie	France	The lugger was driven ashore near Newcastle, County Down, United Kingdom. Her five crew were rescued by the Newcastle Lifeboat. She was on a voyage from Bordeaux, Gironde to Dublin, United Kingdom.

== 13 December ==
List of shipwrecks: 13 December 1858
Ship	State	Description
Ajax	Hamburg	The galiot sprang a leak and sank in the North Sea off Eyemouth, Berwickshire, United Kingdom. Her crew survived. She was on a voyage from Aberdeen, United Kingdom to Hamburg.
Alice	United States	The ship was driven ashore at Boston, Massachusetts. She was on a voyage from Charleston, South Carolina to Trieste.
Hilke	Netherlands	The galiot was driven ashore and wrecked at Ardglass, County Antrim, United Kingdom. She was on a voyage from Nantes, Loire-Inférieure, France to Ardglass.
Gem	United Kingdom	The steamship ran aground near the Haslar Hospital, Gosport, Hampshire. She was on a voyage from Southampton to Portsmouth. She was refloated and towed in to Portsmouth.
Louise Amelie	France	The ship was driven ashore in Dundrum Bay. Her crew were rescued. She was on a voyage from Bordeaux, Gironde to Dublin, United Kingdom.
Plynlymon	United Kingdom	The steamship ran aground on the Patches Rocks. She was refloated the next day and towed in to Aberystwyth, Cardiganshire in a leaky condition.
Ruby	United Kingdom	The steamship ran aground at the Haslar Hospital, Gosport, Hampshire. She was on a voyage from Ryde, Isle of Wight to Portsmouth, Hampshire.

== 14 December ==
List of shipwrecks: 14 December 1858
Ship	State	Description
Anette	France	The ship was driven ashore on Flotta, Orkney Islands, United Kingdom and sank. Her 37 crew were rescued. She was on a voyage from Umeå, Sweden to Valparaíso, Chile.
Champion	United Kingdom	The tug collided with the tug Glowworm (United Kingdom) and sank in the Firth of Clyde with the loss of four of the seven people on board. Survivors were rescued by Glowworm.
Emily	United Kingdom	The ship ran aground at Drogheda, County Louth. She was on a voyage from Drogheda to Glasgow, Renfrewshire.
Gustav Wasa	Sweden	The schooner barque ran aground off "Norl", near Hirtshals, Denmark. Her crew were rescued. She was on a voyage from Hartlepool, County Durham, United Kingdom to Gothenburg.
Heroine, and Sir Charles Napier	United Kingdom	The tug Sir Charles Napier ran aground in the Clyde at Dumbarton whilst towing the smack Heroine, which ran into her and sank. Heroine's crew were rescued by Sir Charles Napier.
Kate	United Kingdom	The ship was driven ashore at Dungeness, Kent. She was on a voyage from Newcastle upon Tyne to Alexandria, Egypt. She was refloated the next day and towed in to Ramsgate, Kent by the tug Vulcan (United Kingdom).
Marcella	United Kingdom	The ship was driven ashore at Gallipoli, Ottoman Empire.
Royal Consort	United Kingdom	The paddle steamer ran aground at Belfast, County Antrim. She was on a voyage from Fleetwood, Lancashire to Belfast. She was refloated.

== 15 December ==
List of shipwrecks: 15 December 1858
Ship	State	Description
Engineer	United Kingdom	The brig was abandoned off Heraklion, Crete. Her crew were rescued by the brig Solide (France). Engineer was on a voyage from St. Jean d'Acre, Ottoman Syria to Livorno, Grand Duchy of Tuscany.
Gipsy	United States	The brig was driven ashore near the Thomas Point Shoal Lighthouse, Massachusetts. She was on a voyage from Long Island, New York to Baltimore, Maryland.
Maria	United Kingdom	The ship ran ashore at Maryport, Cumberland. She was on a voyage from Belfast, County Antrim to Maryport.
Mary	United Kingdom	The ship was driven ashore and wrecked at Howick, Northumberland. She was on a voyage from Prince Edward Island, British North America to Newcastle upon Tyne, Northumberland. She was refloated on 23 December and taken in to Warkworth, Northumberland.
Orient	United Kingdom	The brig was wrecked on a sandbank off Dunkirk, Nord, France. Her crew took to a boat, and were rescued by Bernard Burton (United Kingdom). Orient was on a voyage from Sunderland, County Durham to Ostend, West Flanders, Belgium.
Profeta	Portugal	The schooner was wrecked on Scroby Sands, Norfolk, United Kingdom. Her eleven crew were rescued by the Caistor Lifeboat, but one of them died after being landed She was on a voyage from Leith, Lothian, United Kingdom to Lisbon.
Resolution	United Kingdom	The ship was driven ashore and wrecked at Milford Haven, Pembrokeshire with the loss of a crew member. She was on a voyage from Newport, Monmouthshire to Kinsale, County Cork.
Star of Brunswick	United Kingdom	The ship was driven ashore and wrecked at Eccles-on-Sea, Norfolk.
Victory	United Kingdom	The brig foundered in the North Sea off Hartlepool, County Durham. Her crew survived. She was on a voyage from Sunderland, County Durham to London.

== 16 December ==
List of shipwrecks: 16 December 1858
Ship	State	Description
Albion	United Kingdom	The Yorkshire Billyboy sank in the North Sea 25 nautical miles (46 km) off the mouth of the River Tees. Her three crew were rescued by the schooner Helen (United Kingdom). Albion was on a voyage from South Shields, County Durham to King's Lynn, Norfolk.
Australian	United Kingdom	The schooner collided with the steamship Tiger (United Kingdom) and sank in the Humber at Whitebooth, Yorkshire. Her crew survived. She was on a voyage from São Miguel Island, Azores to Hull, Yorkshire. Australian was refloated on 20 December.
Diana	United Kingdom	The brigantine was driven ashore on Spike Island, County Cork. She was on a voyage from Cork to the Kingroad.
Empire	United Kingdom	The steamship caught fire and was run ashore at Grimsby, Lincolnshire. She was on a voyage from South Shields to London. She was refloated on 16 December and taken in to Grimsby for repairs.
Friendship	United Kingdom	The brig struck a sunken wreck or sandbank and foundered in the North Sea off the coast of Yorkshire. Her crew were rescued by the steamship Alster (United Kingdom). Friendship was on a voyage from Sunderland, County Durham to Littlehampton, Sussex.
Ina	United Kingdom	The barque ran aground on the Groundeddle Bank, off Graemsay, Orkney Islands. She was refloated in a waterlogged condition.
Lucy	United Kingdom	The ship sank at Scarborough, Yorkshire. She was on a voyage from Sunderland, County Durham to Great Yarmouth, Norfolk. She was refloated the next day and taken in to Scarborough.
Marie Antoinette	France	The brigantine collided with the brig Alliance (United Kingdom and sank off Padstow, Cornwall, United Kingdom. Her crew were rescued by Alliance.
Queen	United Kingdom	The Mersey Flat sank in the River Mersey. Her crew were rescued.
Queen of the Tyne	United Kingdom	The paddle tug ran aground on the Herd Sand, in the North Sea off the coast of County Durham and sank.
Susan	United States	The schooner was wrecked on the Glovers Reef, 60 nautical miles (110 km) off Belize City, British Honduras. All on board were rescued.

== 17 December ==
List of shipwrecks: 17 December 1858
Ship	State	Description
Eliza	Russia	The ship collided with the barque Latona (Norway) and was driven ashore at Helsingør, Denmark. She was on a voyage from Riga to Belfast, County Antrim, United Kingdom. She was refloated on 21 December and towed in to Helsingør in severely leaky condition by the steamship Ossian (Denmark).
Felice	Flag unknown	The ship sank off Castle Head, Pembrokeshire, United Kingdom.
Grasshopper	United Kingdom	The ship ran aground on the Haisborough Sands, in the North Sea off the coast of Norfolk and was wrecked. Her crew survived. She was on a voyage from Hartlepool, County Durham to London.
Henry Volant	United Kingdom	The ship sank at Kirkcudbright. She was on a voyage from Pittenweem, Fife to Liverpool, Lancashire. She was refloated on 22 December.
Johannes	Stettin	The ship was driven ashore and wrecked at Helsingør. Her crew were rescued. She was on a voyage from Middlesbrough, Yorkshire, United Kingdom to Stettin.
Lucien	United Kingdom	The brig was driven ashore at Groatness Point, Lothian. She was refloated and resumed her voyage.
Reindeer	United Kingdom	The schooner ran aground on the North Rock, in Strangford Lough. She was on a voyage from Liverpool to Saint John's, Newfoundland, British North America.

== 18 December ==
List of shipwrecks: 18 December 1858
Ship	State	Description
Eliza and Hester	United Kingdom	The ship was driven ashore and wrecked at Odesa.
Gannet	United Kingdom	The brig was driven ashore 5 nautical miles (9.3 km) east of Lossiemouth, Lothian. Her crew were rescued. She was on a voyage from Riga, Russia to Belfast, County Antrim.
Margaret and Ann	United Kingdom	The schooner was driven against the breakwater, capsized and sank at Drogheda, County Louth. She was on a voyage from Preston, Lancashire to Drogheda.
Rose	United Kingdom	The schooner was driven ashore at Newburgh, Fife. Her crew were rescued. She was on a voyage from Hartlepool, County Durham to Portsoy, Aberdeenshire. Rose was refloated on 22 December and taken in to Newburgh.

== 19 December ==
List of shipwrecks: 19 December 1858
Ship	State	Description
Alexander	United Kingdom	The schooner was driven ashore at Teignmouth, Devon. She was refloated.
Alice McVicar	United Kingdom	The ship ran aground on the Brake Sand. She was refloated and resumed her voyage.
Aurora	United Kingdom	The brig ran aground in the Sherbro River. She was refloated.
Catherine Sypkens	United States	The ship was driven ashore and wrecked near Arendal with the loss of two of her crew. She was on a voyage from Kjose to Arundel, Sussex, United Kingdom.
Dromahir	United Kingdom	The barque was wrecked in the Atlantic Ocean (51°34′N 30°20′W). Five of her crew died before the survivors were rescued on 9 January 1859 by Centurion (United States). Dromahir was on a voyage from Quebec City, Province of Canada, British North America to the Clyde.
Flora Muir	United Kingdom	The ship was driven ashore in Loch Indaal and was abandoned by her crew. She was on a voyage from Saint John, New Brunswick, British North America to Queenstown, County Cork.
Isabella	United Kingdom	The brigantine was driven ashore and wrecked at St. Buryan, Cornwall with the loss of three of her crew. She was on a voyage from Newport, Monmouthshire to Plymouth, Devon.
John	United Kingdom	The brig ran aground in the Sound of Mull.
Lexovierne	France	The ship was wrecked at Praa Sands, Cornwall. Her crew were rescued. She was on a voyage from Nantes, Loire-Inférieure to Cardiff, Glamorgan.
Oakland	United States	The ship was struck by lightning and set afire in the Atlantic Ocean. Her crew took to two boats. Six crew in one of the boats were rescued by Emilie (France. Oakland was on a voyage from Charleston, South Carolina to Liverpool, Lancashire, United Kingdom.

== 20 December ==
List of shipwrecks: 20 December 1858
Ship	State	Description
Sea Horse	United Kingdom	The steamship ran aground near Brielle, South Holland, Netherlands. She was refloated.

== 21 December ==
List of shipwrecks: 21 December 1858
Ship	State	Description
Edgar	United Kingdom	The brig ran aground off Lowestoft, Suffolk. She was refloated.
Black Prince	United Kingdom	The brig ran aground on the Holme Sand, in the North Sea off the coast of Suffolk and sank. Her crew survived.
Three Brothers	United Kingdom	The brig was driven ashore and wrecked in Sandwood Bay. She was on a voyage from Dalhousie, New Brunswick, British North America to Chester, Cheshire.

== 22 December ==
List of shipwrecks: 22 December 1858
Ship	State	Description
Alpha	United Kingdom	The schooner ran aground on the Herd Sand, in the North Sea off the coast of County Durham. She was refloated and resumed her voyage.
Anna	France	The schooner struck the Wolf Rock, off the coast of Cornwall, United Kingdom and capsized. Her crew were rescued by the cutter Sylvia (United Kingdom). Anna was on a voyage from Caen, Calvados to Swansea, Glamorgan, United Kingdom.
Anna	Grand Duchy of Oldenburg	The schooner was driven ashore and wrecked on Texel, North Holland, Netherlands. Her crew were rescued. She was on a voyage from Newcastle upon Tyne, Northumberland, United Kingdom to Lisbon, Portugal.
British Queen	United Kingdom	The brig was wrecked on the Corton Sand or the Holm Sand, in the North Sea off the coast Suffolk. Her crew were rescued. She was on a voyage from Seaham, County Durham to London.
Carl Staegemann	Hamburg	The ship was driven ashore at Audreselles, Pas-de-Calais, France. Twenty-three crew were rescued. She was on a voyage from Lagos, Africa to Hamburg.
Elise	France	The brig collided with the Goodwin Lightship ( Trinity House) and was abandoned by all but one of her crew, who got aboard the lightship. She subsequently ran aground on the Goodwin Sands, Kent, United Kingdom. Elise was on a voyage from Agrigento, Sicily to Dunkirk, Nord. She was refloated and taken in to Ramsgate, Kent.
Escape	(United Kingdom of Great Britain and Ireland) British North America	The brigantine was driven ashore in Loch Ròg. She was on a voyage from Saint John's, Newfoundland to Greenock, Renfrewshire.
Isaac Wright	United States	The ship caught fire in the River Mersey. She was on a voyage from Liverpool, Lancashire, United Kingdom to New York. She was taken in to Liverpool, where her passengers and crew were taken off and she was scuttled by HMS Hastings (Royal Navy) but she continued to burn.
Stadt Barth	Grand Duchy of Oldenburg	The brig was wrecked at Ringkøbing, Denmark. Her crew were rescued. She was on a voyage from Newcastle upon Tyne to Barth.
Talavera, or Talusin	United Kingdom	The sloop was abandoned in the Irish Sea off Rhyl, Denbighshire. She was on a voyage from Conway, Anglesey to Liverpool, Lancashire.

== 23 December ==
List of shipwrecks: 23 December 1858
Ship	State	Description
Carleton	United Kingdom	The barque foundered in the Atlantic Ocean. Her crew were rescued. SHe was on a voyage from Restigouche, New Brunswick, British North America to Limerick.
F. A. Palmer	United States	The ship ran aground in the Scheldt.
Three Brothers	United Kingdom	The ship was driven ashore near Cape Wrath, Sutherland. Her crew were rescued.
Windsor	United Kingdom	The ship ran aground in the River Nene.

== 24 December ==
List of shipwrecks: 24 December 1858
Ship	State	Description
Alfred	United Kingdom	The brig was driven ashore and severely damaged at Burry Port, Glamorgan.
Columbus	United Kingdom	The ship was driven ashore at Dingle, Lancashire. She was on a voyage from New York, United States to Liverpool, Lancashire.
Sherlock	United Kingdom	The brig was driven ashore at Bath, Zeeland, Netherlands. She was on a voyage from Antwerp, Belgium to Sunderland, County Durham.

== 25 December ==
List of shipwrecks: 25 December 1858
Ship	State	Description
Cambyses	United Kingdom	The brig was driven ashore on Barra, Outer Hebrides and capsized.
Harriet	United Kingdom	The schooner ran aground on the Barber Sand, in the North Sea off the coast of Norfolk.
Triumph	United Kingdom	The brig was abandoned in the Atlantic Ocean. Her crew were rescued by Cordelia (United Kingdom). Triumph was on a voyage from Saint John, New Brunswick, British North America to Limerick.
Yorkshire Lass	United Kingdom	The smack was driven ashore and sank at Scarborough, Yorkshire. She was refloated on 22 February 1859.

== 26 December ==
List of shipwrecks: 26 December 1858
Ship	State	Description
Ann	United Kingdom	The ship ran aground in Horsens Fjord. She was on a voyage from Horsens, Denmark to Leith, Lothian. She was refloated three days later and taken in to Helsingør, Denmark in a leaky condition.
Blue Bell	United Kingdom	The schooner ran aground on the Herd Sand, in the North Sea off the coast of County Durham. She was refloated with the assistance of a tug and taken in to South Shields, County Durham.
Coriander	United Kingdom	The schooner was wrecked in Robin Hoods Bay. Her crew were rescued. She was on a voyage from King's Lynn, Norfolk to Sunderland, County Durham.
Fourteen	United Kingdom	The ship was driven ashore at Alexandria, Egypt. She was refloated and placed under repair.
George and Alexander	United Kingdom	The ship ran aground in the River Tay. She was on a voyage from Montrose, Forfarshire to Newcastle upon Tyne, Northumberland. She was refloated and resumed her voyage.
Gisina	Netherlands	The ship was driven ashore at Alexandria, Egypt.
Hazard	Sweden	The brigantine ran aground at Padstow, Cornwall, United Kingdom. She was on a voyage from Alexandria, Egypt to Cork, United Kingdom.
Mariquita	France	The chasse-marée ran aground on the Newcombe Sand, in the North Sea off the coast of Suffolk, United Kingdom. She was refloated and taken in to Lowestoft, Suffolk.
Peter Andras	Sweden	The ship was driven ashore at Alexandria.
Rebecca	United Kingdom	The ship was driven ashore at New Orleans, Louisiana, United States.
Trinity Yacht	(United Kingdom of Great Britain and Ireland) Guernsey	The schooner ran aground on the Shipwash Sand, in the North Sea off the coast of Suffolk. Three of her crew took to a boat and were reported missing. She was on a voyage from Hull, Yorkshire to São Miguel Island, Azores. Trinity Yacht was refloated and taken in to Harwich, Essex.

== 27 December ==
List of shipwrecks: 27 December 1858
Ship	State	Description
Alert	United Kingdom	The schooner ran aground on the Dogger Bank, in the Irish Sea off the coast of County Wexford. She was refloated.
Aurora	Belgium	The smack sank in the North Sea. Her crew survived.
Caractacus	United Kingdom	The barque ran aground on the Herd Sand, in the North Sea off the coast of County Durham. Some of those on board were taken off by the South Shields Lifeboat. Caractacus was on a voyage from Galway to South Shields, County Durham. She was refloated on 1 January 1859 and taken in to South Shields.
Eaglet	United Kingdom	The ship ran aground on the Falsterbo Reef, in the Baltic Sea. She was on a voyage from "Wyburgh" to Memel, Kingdom of Prussia and Grimsby, Lincolnshire. She was refloated and take in to Malmö, Sweden for repairs.
Energie	France	The schooner abandoned in the North Sea. She was on a voyage from Seaham, County Durham to Saint-Malo, Ille-et-Vilaine. She was driven ashore and wrecked 4 nautical miles (7.4 km) east of Ostend, West Flanders, Belgium.
Ocean Queen	United Kingdom	The ship was driven ashore at Appledore, Devon.
Reine de Anges	France	The chasse-marée ran aground on the Shipwash Sand, in the North Sea off the coast of Suffolk, United Kingdom. She was refloated with the assistance of three smacks and take in to Harwich, Essex, United Kingdom.
Vine	United Kingdom	The ship was wrecked on the Norfolk coast. Her crew were rescued.
Vintage	United Kingdom	The schooner was driven ashore and wrecked near Blackpool, Lancashire. Her four crew were rescued. She was on a voyage from Liverpool, Lancashire to Dublin.

== 28 December ==
List of shipwrecks: 28 December 1858
Ship	State	Description
Ariel	United Kingdom	The ship was driven ashore near Wells-next-the-Sea, Norfolk. She was on a voyage from Marstrand, Sweden to London. She was refloated on 2 January 1859 and taken in to Blakeney, Norfolk.
Aufgekende Sonne	Denmark	The ship was driven ashore on Laaland. She was on a voyage from Saxkjøbing to Stockton-on-Tees, County Durham, United Kingdom. She was refloated and put in to Rendsburg, Duchy of Schleswig for repairs.
Coadjutor	United Kingdom	The ship sank off Veurne, West Flanders, Belgium. Her crew were rescued. She was on a voyage from Sunderland, County Durham to London.
Confianza	Portugal	The schooner foundered off Westkapelle, West Flanders. Her crew were rescued by the fishing boat Gaspard (Belgium). Confianaza was on a voyage from Sunderland to Lisbon.
Elizabeth	United Kingdom	The ship was driven ashore near "Hœmskerk", Belgium. Her crew were rescued. She was on a voyage from Hartlepool, County Durham to Ostend, West Flanders.
Mazeppa	United Kingdom	schooner capsized and sank at Hong Kong with the loss of all hands.
Minnie Harley	United Kingdom	The brigantine was abandoned off the Butt of Lewis. She was on a voyage from Arkhangelsk, Russia to Cork.

== 29 December ==
List of shipwrecks: 29 December 1858
Ship	State	Description
Arion	Norway	The ship was driven ashore and wrecked north of Frederikshavn, Denmark. She was on a voyage from Newcastle upon Tyne, Northumberland, United Kingdom to Randers.
Ceres	United Kingdom	The ship was driven ashore at Frederikshavn.
Endeavour	United Kingdom	The barque collided with the barque Adeline (United Kingdom) and sank at Cartagena, Spain. Her crew were rescued. She was on a voyage from Odesa to Falmouth, Cornwall of Queenstown, County Cork.
Henrys	United Kingdom	The brig was run down by the steamship Vigilant (United Kingdom) and sank off Pakefield, Suffolk. Henrys was on a voyage from Crimea, Russia to Grimsby, Lincolnshire.
John and Isabella	United Kingdom	The ship was driven ashore at Belmullet, County Mayo.
John Johnson	Sweden	The ship was wrecked on the Haisborough Sands, in the North Sea off the coast of Norfolk, United Kingdom. She was on a voyage from Stockholm to Marseille, Bouches-du-Rhône, France.
Jonge Renke	Denmark	The ship ran aground in the Agger Canal. She was refloated and found to be severely leaky.
Julia	United Kingdom	The ship was driven ashore at Frederikshavn.
Leo	United Kingdom	The ship was driven ashore at Frederikshavn.
Othello	United Kingdom	The ship sank at Frederikshavn. Her crew were rescued.
Othello	United Kingdom	The ship capsized in the Atlantic Ocean. Her crew were rescued by Commerce de Paris (France). Othello was on a voyage from Newport, Monmouthshire to the Isles of Scilly and London.
Royal Albert	United Kingdom	The ship was driven ashore near Gravelines, Nord, France. Her crew were rescued.
Stirling Castle	United Kingdom	The schooner ran aground on the Longsand, in the North Sea off the coast of Essex and was abandoned by her crew. She was on a voyage from Inverness to London. Stirling Castle was subsequently towed in to Harwich, Essex.

== 30 December ==
List of shipwrecks: 30 December 1858
Ship	State	Description
Aragon	Hamburg	The barque was wrecked in Table Bay.

== 31 December ==
List of shipwrecks: 31 December 1858
Ship	State	Description
Annie Margrethe	Denmark	The ship ran aground on the Shipwash Sand, in the North Sea off the coast of Essex, United Kingdom. She was on a voyage from Bogense to London, United Kingdom. She was refloated and assisted in to Harwich, Essex in a leaky condition.
Bertha	United States	The barque was driven ashore and severely damaged at Palermo, Sicily. She was refloated on 3 January 1859 with assistance from the steamship Taurus ( Kingdom of the Two Sicilies) and taken in to Palermo for repairs.
Jane Black	United Kingdom	The ship was abandoned in the Atlantic Ocean. Her crew were rescued by Flora McDonald (United States).
Madinina	France	The steamship was driven ashore and wrecked at Bône. Algeria. All on board survived. She was on a voyage from Tunis, Beylik of Tunis to Bôna.
Orland	United States	The brigantine was wrecked on the Pedro Shoals. Her crew were rescued.
St. Michael	United Kingdom	The tug collided with Panther (United Kingdom and sank in the River Thames. She had been refloated by 5 January 1859 and taken in to Bow Creek for repairs.

== Unknown date ==
List of shipwrecks: Unknown date in December 1858
Ship	State	Description
Abeona	United Kingdom	The ship foundered in the Atlantic Ocean before 23 December. Her crew survived. She was on a voyage from Africa to Liverpool, Lancashire.
Adelphi	United Kingdom	The ship struck a submerged object and sank in the River Tyne at Pelaw, Northumberland. She was refloated and found to be severely damaged, but was placed under repair.
Agenoria	United Kingdom	The ship was abandoned in the Atlantic Ocean. She was on a voyage from Saint John, New Brunswick, British North America to Kingstown, County Dublin.
Alexander	United Kingdom	The ship ran aground on the Bags Ledge, in the Isles of Scilly. She was refloated.
Anna Louise	Netherlands	The brig was lost in the Dogger Bank before 4 December. Her crew were rescued. She was on a voyage from Newcastle upon Tyne, Northumberland to Amsterdam, North Holland.
Aurora	United Kingdom	The brig ran aground on the Skerbor River. She was refloated and taken to a port in Sierra Leone before 20 December. She was consequently condemned.
Axe	United Kingdom	The schooner ran aground on the Falsterbo Reef, in the Baltic Sea.
A. Y. Trask	(United Kingdom of Great Britain and Ireland) British North America	The schooner foundered in Puget Sound on or about 10 December.
Bartolo	Spain	The brig ran aground on the Longsand, in the North Sea off the coast of Essex, United Kingdom. She was refloated and taken in to Rochester, Kent, United Kingdom for repairs.
Biovald	Denmark	The full-rigged ship foundered off Cape Horn, Chile. Her crew were rescued. She was on a voyage from Newcastle upon Tyne to Valparaíso, Chile.
City of Delhi	United Kingdom	The ship was driven ashore at Lamlash, Isle of Arran. She was on a voyage from Greenock, Renfrewshire to Calcutta, India. She was refloated and put back to Greenock.
Cresswell	United Kingdom	The ship ran aground on the Kentish Knock. She was on a voyage from London to Havana, Cuba. She was refloated and put back to London.
Due Fratelli	United Principalities	The ship foundered in the Black Sea.
Dorothea	Norway	The barque collided with another ship and foundered in the Atlantic Ocean before 4 December. Her crew were rescued by Equinox (United Kingdom).
Duchess of Northumberland	United Kingdom	The ship was abandoned in the Atlantic Ocean. Her crew were rescued by Marion (United Kingdom).
Elisha Kent	United States	The barque was abandoned in the Atlantic Ocean before 25 December. Her crew were rescued by Rising Sun (United States).
Elizabeth Hall	United States	The barque was abandoned in the Atlantic Ocean before 6 December. Her crew were rescued by the brig Bull (United Kingdom). Elizabeth Hall was on a voyage from Portland, Maine to the Canary Islands.
Elizabeth Moore	United Kingdom	The ship was abandoned in the Atlantic Ocean before 15 December.
Elk	United Kingdom	The ship was driven ashore and wrecked at Ardglass, County Down before 14 December.
Eva	United Kingdom	The barque ran aground on the Shipwash Sand, in the North Sea off the coast of Suffolk. She was refloated and assisted in to Harwich, Essex.
Evangilistria	Greece	The brig foundered in the Black Sea.
Fanny Palmer	United Kingdom	The ship foundered at sea before 23 December. She was on a voyage from Callao, Peru to a British port.
Freeland	United Kingdom	The barque was abandoned at sea before 6 December. Her crew were rescued. She was on a voyage from Liverpool to Gibraltar.
Furst Blucher	Rostock	The ship was driven ashore and wrecked on Skagen, Denmark before 20 December. She was on a voyage from Yorkshire, United Kingdom to Rostock.
Gianetta	Trieste	The ship was wrecked in the Danube before 15 December.
Gianetta	Papal States	The brig foundered in the Black Sea.
Graf von Schwerin	Flag unknown	The koff was driven ashore at Trondheim, Norway. She was on a voyage from Arkhangelsk, Russia to London.
Gratitude	United Kingdom	The ship was wrecked near Brindisi, Kingdom of the Two Sicilies. She was on a voyage from Trieste to Falmouth, Cornwall or Queenstown, County Cork.
Hector	Sweden	The barque ran aground on the Shipwash Sand. She was refloated and assisted in to Harwich.
John Franklin	United States	The schooner was lost returning from Prince Edward Island in December, 1858 or January, 1859. All aboard, 8 passengers and 7 crew, were killed.
John Stephens	(United Kingdom of Great Britain and Ireland) British North America	The schooner foundered in Puget Sound on or about 10 December.
Kate Wheeler	United States	The barque was abandoned in the Mediterranean Sea. Her crew were rescued by Southerner and a barque (1). Kate Wheeler was on a voyage from Genoa, Kingdom of Sardinia to Boston, Massachusetts.
Klawiller	United Kingdom	The ship foundered in the Black Sea.
Lady Hodgkinson	United Kingdom	The troopship was driven ashore on the Malabar Coast, India. All on board survived. She was on a voyage from London to Bombay, India.
Mangalia	Ottoman Empire	The ship foundered in the Black Sea.
Margaret	United Kingdom	The ship was beached in Mulroy Bay. She was on a voyage from "Ballynase Quay" to Buncrana, County Donegal.
Margaretha Kristine	Denmark	The schooner ran aground on the Shipwash Sand. She was refloated wt=utg assistance of Wonder (United Kingdom).
Margaret Tyspn	United States	The ship foundered with the loss of all but one of her crew. She was on a voyage from New York to San Francisco, California.
Maria	United Kingdom	The barque was abandoned in the Atlantic Ocean before 27 December.
Mathilda	United Kingdom	The ship was abandoned in the Atlantic Ocean before 2 December.
Matthew King	United Kingdom	The ship foundered in the Bristol Channel before 11 December. She was on a voyage from Wilmington, Delaware, United States to Liverpool.
Monica	United Kingdom	The ship sank at Scarborough before 17 December. She was refloated on that date and taken in to Scarborough.
Nancy	United Kingdom	The ship foundered in the Atlantic Ocean. Her crew were rescued. She was on a voyage from Demerara, British Guiana to Queenstown, County Cork.
Nile	United Kingdom	The brig ran aground on the Maplin Sand, in the North Sea off the coast of Essex. She was refloated and assisted in to Harwich in a leaky condition.
Nile	United Kingdom	The brig ran aground on the Cork Sand, in the North Sea off the coast of Essex. She was refloated and assisted in to Harwich.
Palmas	United Kingdom	The ship ran aground on the West Hoyle Bank, in Liverpool Bay. She was on a voyage from Laguna to Liverpool. She was refloated and towed in to Liverpool.
Pelestrina	Flag unknown	The ship was driven ashore near "Ambelachi", Ottoman Empire. She was refloated and taken in to Constantinople.
Reather Schaffer	United Kingdom	The ship foundered off Cape Horn. Her crew were rescued. She was on a voyage from Glasgow, Renfrewshire to a port in California, United States.
HMS Ruby	Royal Navy	The Gleaner-class gunboat was driven ashore at Wells-next-the-Sea, Norfolk. She was refloated on 28 December.
Stirlingshire	United Kingdom	The ship was wrecked on the Russian coast with the loss of all ten crew. She was on a voyage from Kronstadt to London.
Stoliviano	Kingdom of Greece	The ship sank between Chios and Psara.
Tilsit	Stettin	The steamship was driven ashore at Stettin. She was refloated on 29 December.
Valkyren	Denmark	The schooner ran aground on the Andrews Sand, in the North Sea off the coast of Essex. She was refloated and assisted in to Harwich.
Victor Henriette	France	The brig was abandoned at sea. Her crew were rescued by the steamship Alicante (Spain).
Viscount	United Kingdom	The full-rigged ship foundered off Cape Horn. Her crew were rescued. She was on a voyage from Glasgow to Arica, Chile.
Waterloo	United Kingdom	The barque was abandoned off Cuxhaven.
Wild Irish Girl	United Kingdom	The barque was abandoned in the Atlantic Ocean before 23 December. Her sixteen crew were rescued by Providence (United Kingdom). Wild Irish Girl was on a voyage from Sunderland, County Durham to Lisbon, Portugal.
William B. Dean	United Kingdom	The ship was abandoned in the Atlantic Ocean. She was on a voyage from Saint John, New Brunswick, British North America to Kingstown, County Dublin. She was subsequently taken in to Boston, Massachusetts, United States.
Woodpark	United Kingdom	The ship sank in the River Thames.
