= Endelave =

Endelave Island
- Island
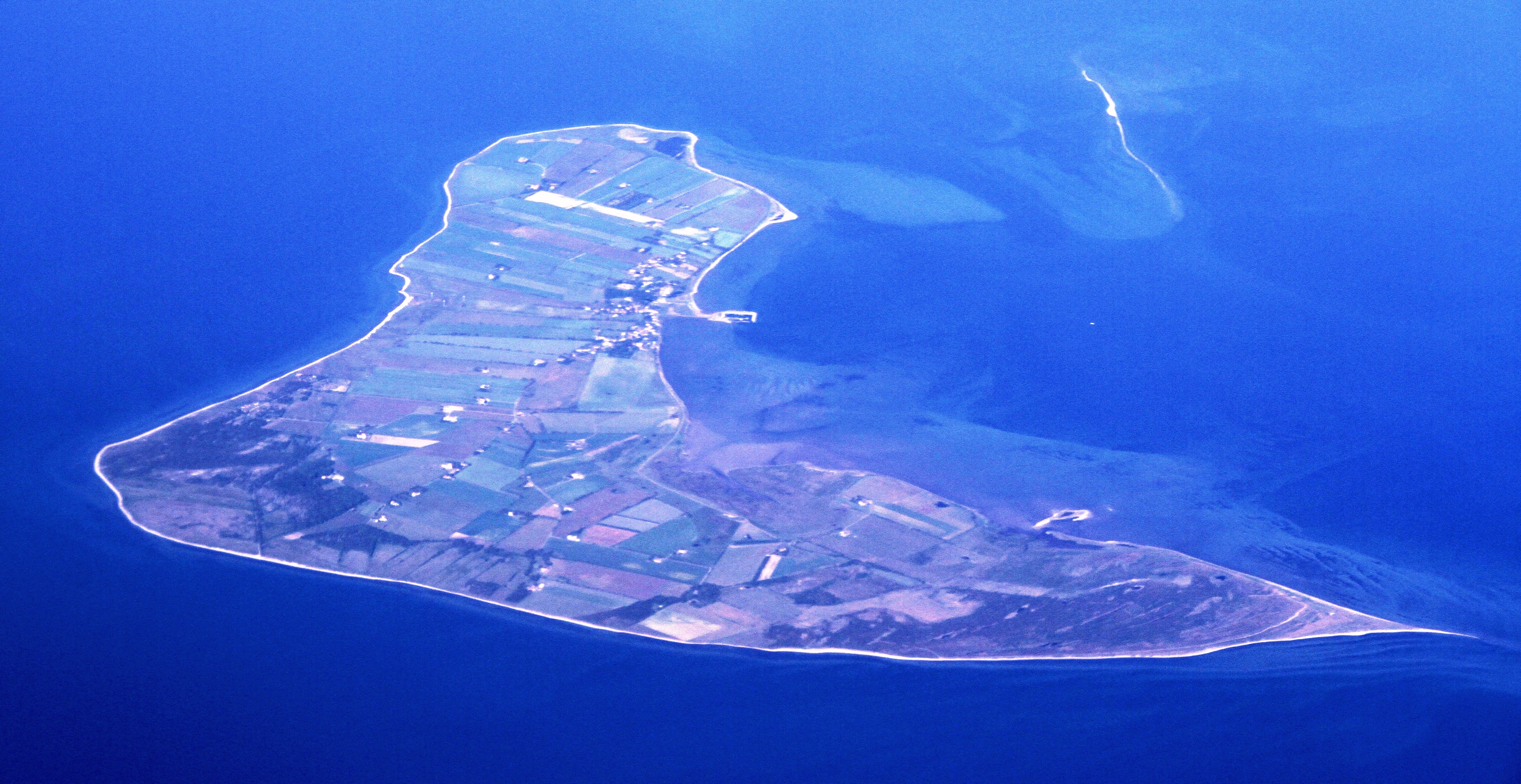
- The island of Endelave seen from the north east

- Location within Denmark
- Coordinates: 55°45′0″N 10°18′0″E
- Country: Denmark
- Municipality: Horsens municipality

Area
  - Total: 13.2 km^{2} (5.1 sq mi)

Population (2011)
  - Total: 185
  - Density: 14.0/km^{2} (36.3/sq mi)
- Time zone: UTC+1 (CET)
  - Summer (DST): UTC+2 (CEST)
- Postal codes

Endelave is a Danish island in the Kattegat, north of Odense, off the coast of Funen, and west of Samsø. The island covers an area of 13.2 km^{2} (5.1 sq mi) and has 185 inhabitants.

== Nature and Protected areas ==
Endelave and its surrounding seaside is important for many birds, both on domestic and international levels and it is therefore a Ramsar area. The Ramsar protection is part of the Ramsar protection in Horsens Fjord and has number 152. The total area of the entire protection encompass 42,737 ha. The reef 'Møllegrunden' Northwest of the island is an important resting and breeding site for many seals in the Kattegat sea. The bay of Endelave is comprised by a large intertidal zone similar to the wadden sea area. About a third of the island itself is protected under the Natura 2000 plan, housing vulnerable and outstanding nature-types such as a heather moorland thicket, a beach-meadow and oak forests for example.

Endelave is home to a population of wild rabbits of variable size. It is a locally distributed animal in Denmark, but where it is found the population is usually large. The rabbits on Endelave are hunted when in season and in the last few years, more than half of the total rabbit bag in Denmark (a stable level of 5000 animal pro anno), was from Endelave.

== Gallery ==
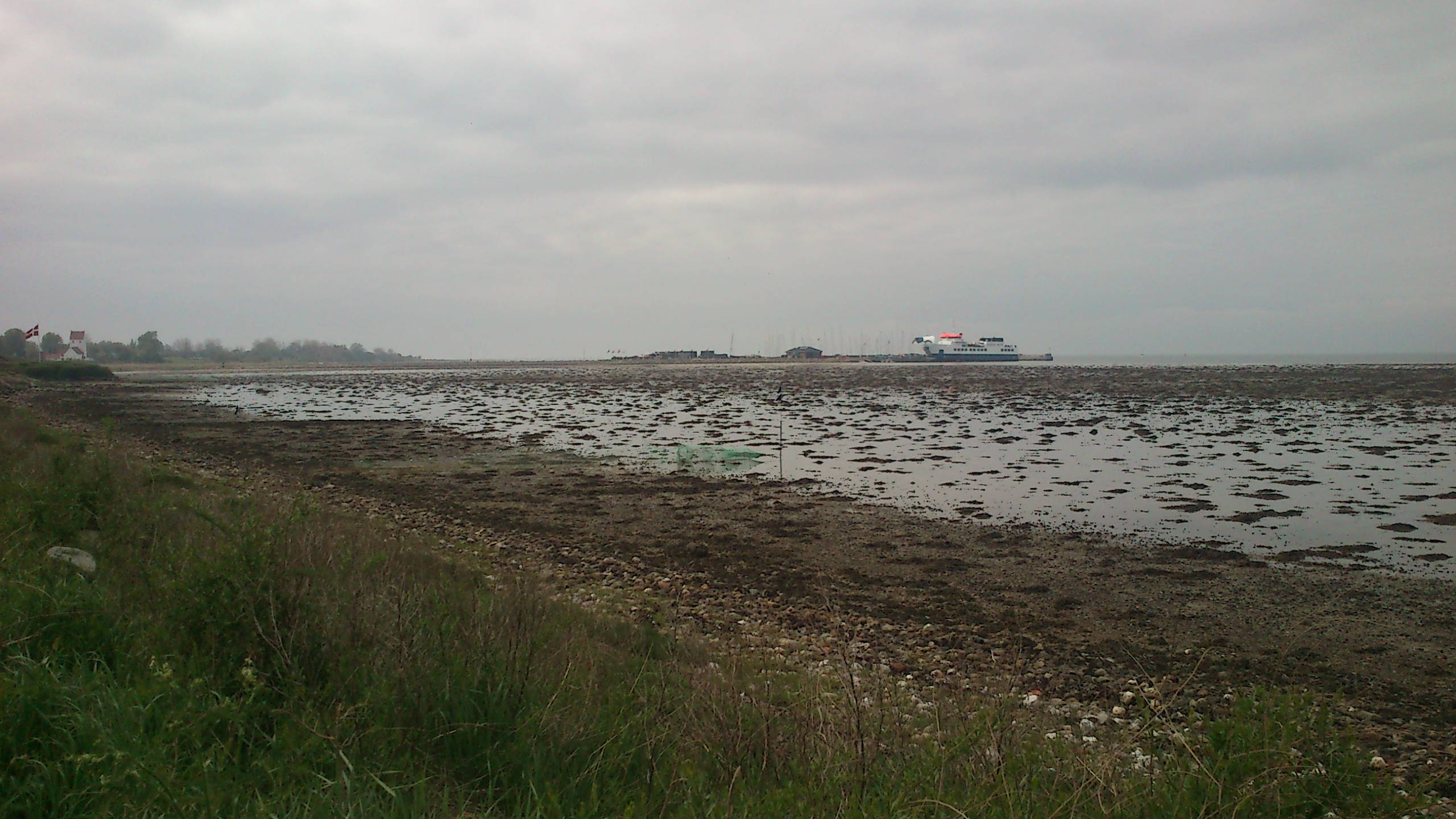
The extensive intertidal zone in the bay during ebb.

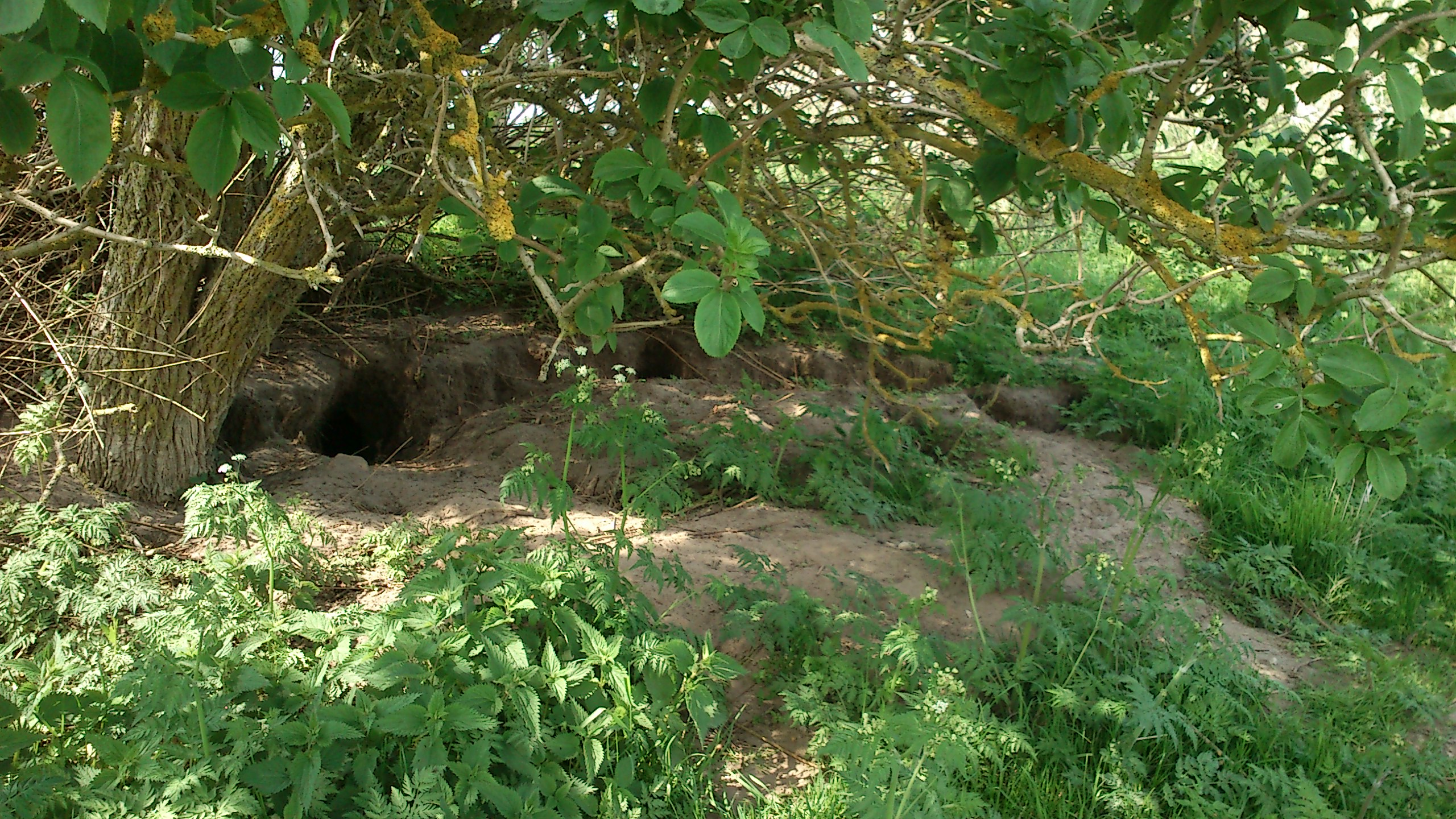
Rabbit hole complex

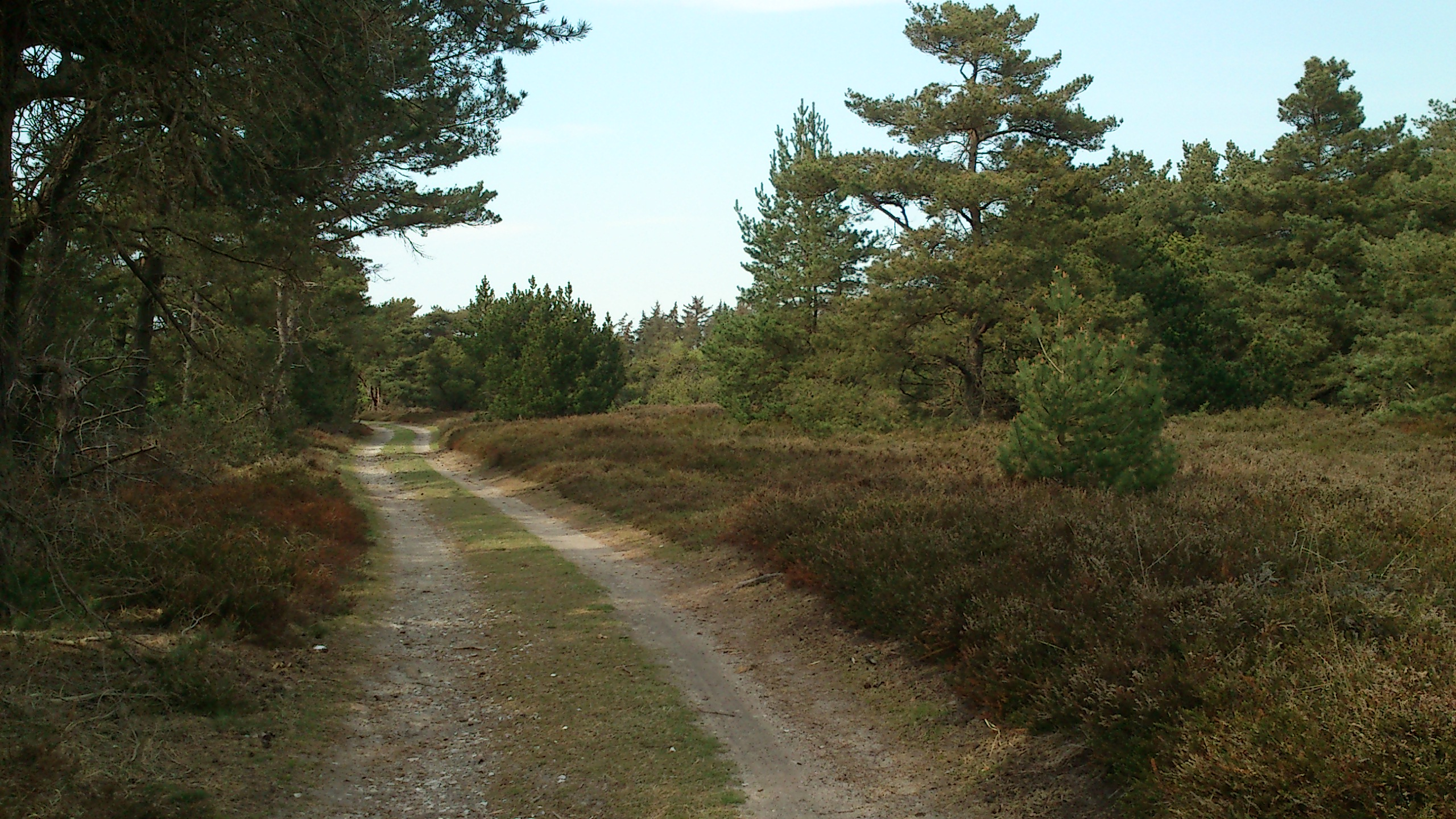
Heather moorland thicket

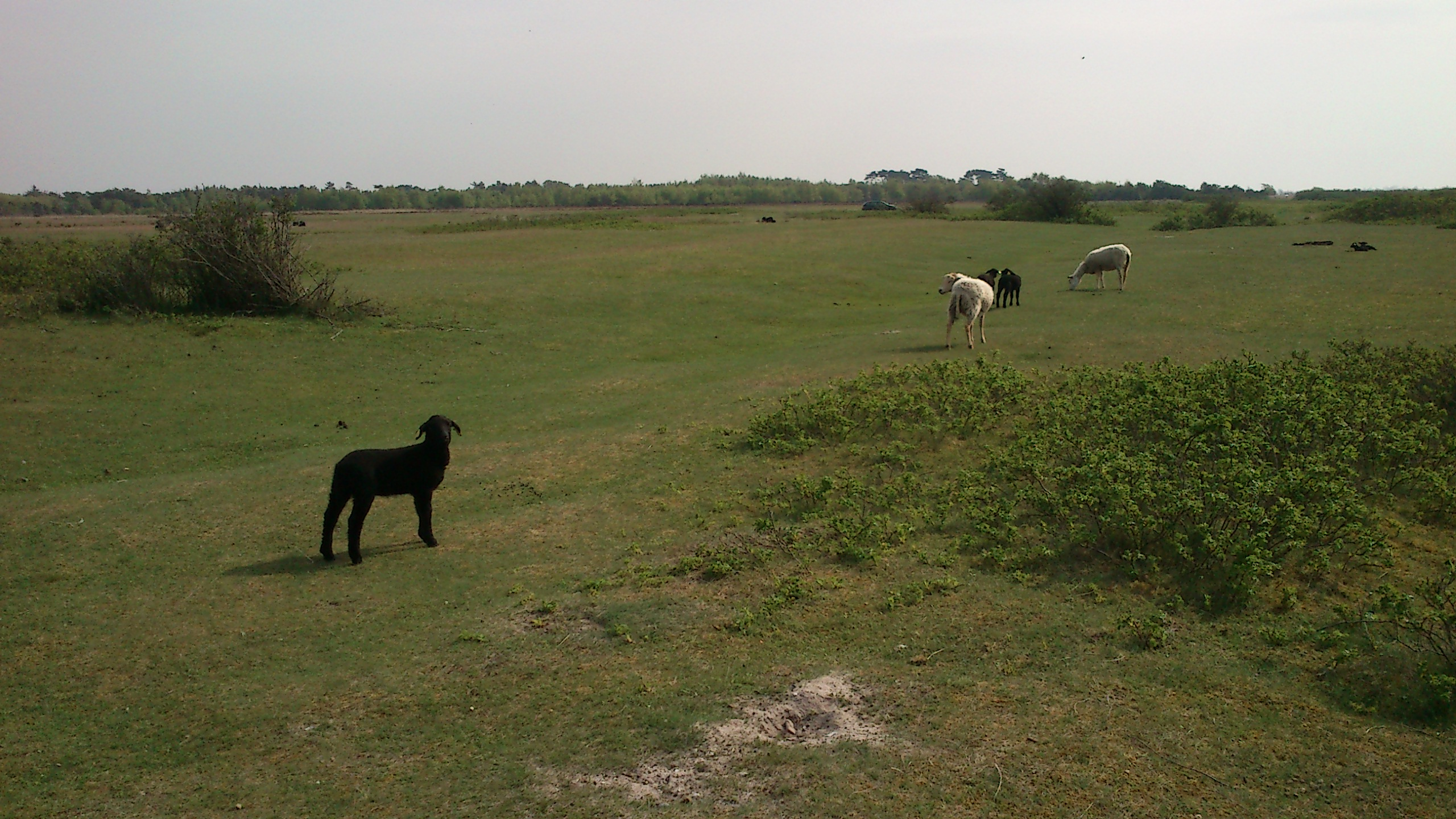
Beach meadow

== See also ==
- Nearby islands: Hjarnø, Tunø, Samsø, Æbelø, Alrø.
- Nearby cities: Horsens, Aarhus.

== Sources ==
- Endelave Danish Ministry of the Environment (in Danish)
- Tageo.com, "VESTSJAELLAND DENMARK Geography Population" (coordinates), 2007, webpage: Tageo-index.
- Denmark Postal codes, webpage: Postnumre-DK.
- Tele.dk Denmark detailed road map, webpage: Tele-DK-Danmark.
