= Begha =

Coordinates: 33°22′35″S 27°19′25″E

Begha is a village south of East London in South Africa at the mouth of the Birha River.

In 1858 the steam ship Madagascar of the Rennie line was lost after she hit a reef near the mouth of the Birha River, around midnight on 3 December. Attempts to keep the ship afloat failed and she was run aground on the 4th and broke up. There were no deaths.
