= Birha =

Birha may refer to:

- Birha (folk song), a folk song genre of India
- Birha River, a river in South Africa
