= Förden and East Jutland Fjorde =

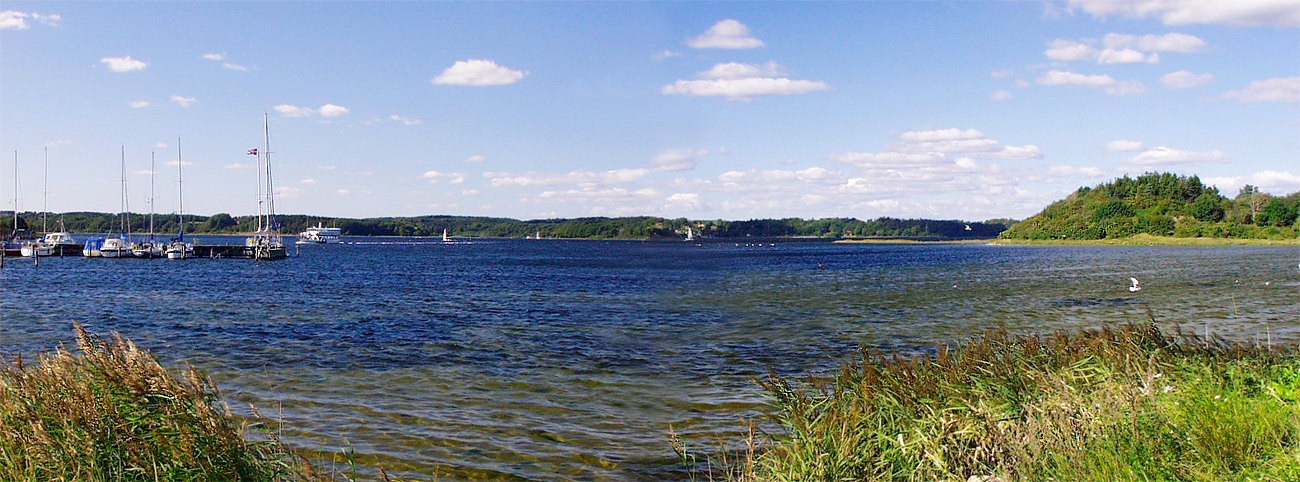
Mariager Fjord

The eastern coast of the Jutland Peninsula, consisting of Danish Jutland and German Schleswig-Holstein features a type of narrow bay called Förde (plural: Förden) in German and fjord (plural fjorde) in Danish. These bays are of glacial origin, but the glacial mechanics were different from those of Norwegian Fjords and also from those of Swedish and Finnish Fjards. Inlets more similar to these are also found on the peninsulas of the Green bay and Georgian bay, and on Manitoulin island, and eastern Long island.

The words Förde, fjord and fjard are of the same origin as the English word firth, but today there are differences in the meaning between firth (Förde) and fjord in general.

== Geology ==
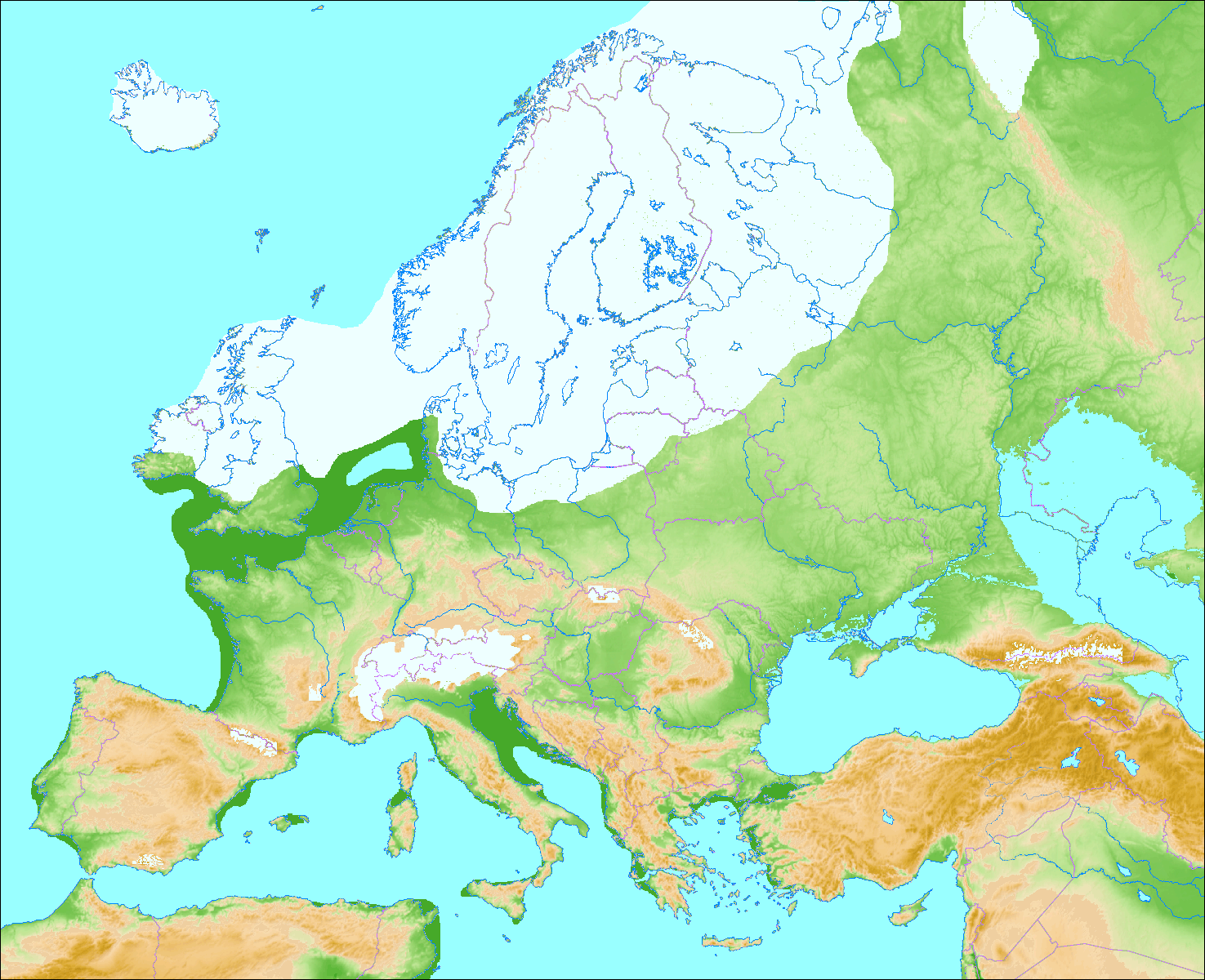
Europe during Weichselian- & Würm-Glaciation

When the area of the present Baltic Sea was covered by an ice sheet during the Weichselian glaciation, about 20,000 to 70,000 years ago, the edge of the ice moved on land as tongues of glaciers; these carved out channels. When the ice retreated it created a large lake. The water level rose and the channels were filled by water. The material removed formed moraine hills near the sides and ends of the channels.

Some of these Förden and fjorde are believed not to have been carved out by the ice directly, but to have been washed out by flows of water below the ice (tunnel valleys). Alternatively they have been interpreted as 'beheaded' river channels preserved beside a tideless sea.

== List ==
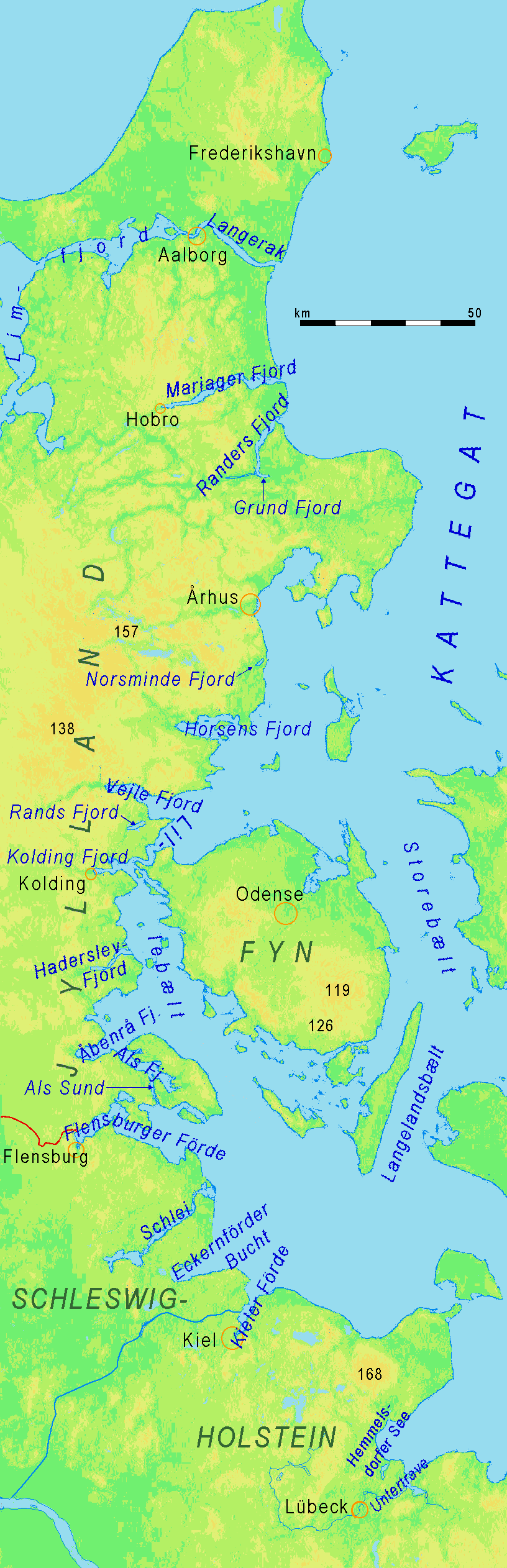
Fjorde of East Jutland and Förden of Schleswig-Holstein

The present day firths of this region includes:

=== Denmark ===
- Langerak: Length 32 km. Eastern part of Limfjord, really a strait with eastern entrance from Kattegat and western communication to the other parts of Limfjord, which are rather lagoons.
- Mariager Fjord: Length 35 km, deep channel 42 km.
- Randers Fjord: Length 30 km. Entrance from the north, branching in the south, with eastern branch.
  - Grund Fjord: Less obstructed by sand than the main fjord.
- Norsminde Fjord: Hardly 3 km long. Now a lake due to silting.
- Horsens Fjord: Length 16 km. The entrance between the islands of Alrø and Hjarnø is called Alrø Sund.
- Vejle Fjord: Length 12 km.
- Rands Fjord: Length 3 km. Up to 19th century it was a real bay; then a dam was built to separate it from the sea. Now the former fjord is used as a reserve of fresh water.
- Kolding Fjord: Length 10 km. A branch of the narrow part of the Little Belt.
- Haderslev Fjord: Length 15 km. The narrowest fjord.
- Åbenrå Fjord: Length 10 km, width 3 – 4 km.
- Als Fjord: Length 12 km, prolonged to 20 km by Augustenborg Fjord (8 km). In addition to the main entrance from the north, there is a narrow second entrance called Als Sund; the blind end is Augustenborg Fjord.

=== Border ===
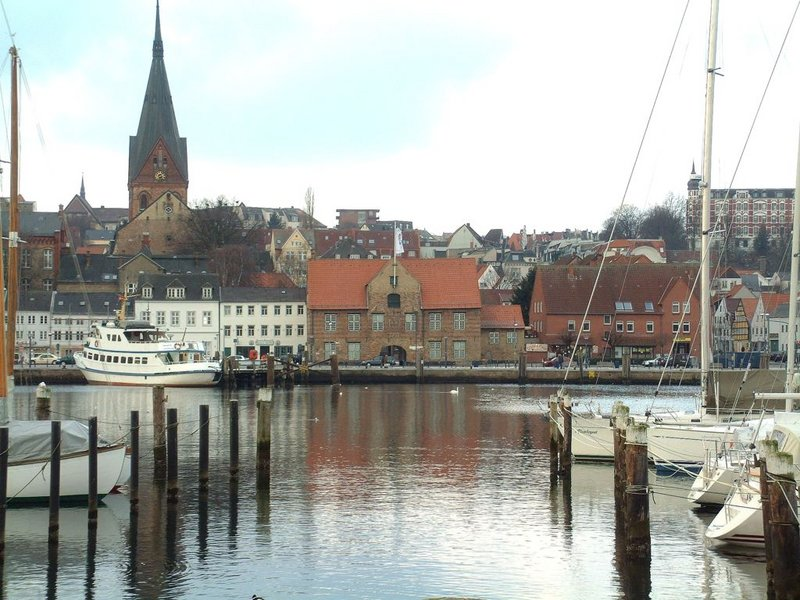
The inner part of Flensburger Förde has been used as a harbour since the Middle Ages.

- Flensburg Firth, in German Flensburger Förde, in Danish Flensborg Fjord: It is the largest of these bays (length 40 or 50 km), and reaches farthest west.

=== Germany ===
- Schlei, in Danish Slien: Length 40 – 42 km. The narrowest German Förde.
- Eckernförde Bay, in German Eckernförder Bucht, in Danish Egernførde Bugt: The component -förde in the name of the city has been considered by some authors to reference a ford and by others to a fjord.
- Kieler Förde: Geologically larger than nominally, as a part of the large Kiel Bay belongs geographically to Kieler Förde.
- The lake Hemmelsdorfer See is a former Förde.
- Traveförde is now partly filled up by sand. The residual part is called Pötenitzer Wiek and connects to the sea only by the estuary of the Trave river.

== Literature ==
- Kurt-Dietmar Schmidtke: Die Entstehung Schleswig-Holsteins, Neumünster (Germany), 3rd edition 1995, ISBN 3-529-05316-3
