= Vorsø =

Island in Denmark

- Location within Central Denmark Region

Geography
- Location: Horsens Fjord
- Coordinates: 55°52′N 10°0′E
- Area: 0.62 km^{2} (0.24 sq mi)

Administration
- Denmark
- Region: Region Midtjylland
- Municipality: Horsens Municipality

Demographics
- Population: 1 (January 2009)

Vorsø is a small Danish island in Horsens Fjord, Horsens Municipality. Vorsø has an area of 0.62 km^{2} and a population of 1 as of January 2025.
