= Langerak (fjord) =

Danish fjord

Coordinates: 57.05°N 10.07°E

Langerak is the name for the eastern part of Limfjord in Denmark and is one of the East Jutish Fjorde. The designation covers the narrow length of the fjord between Aalborg and Hals which is approximately 30 km long and ranges between 400m to 2 km in width. The meandering fjord was created during the last ice age.

For most of recorded history Langerak was the only access to the open sea from the regional commercial centre of Aalborg. In 1825 however the isthmus at the western end of Limfjorden was breach by the sea and the fjord has technically been a strait since then. Langerak however remains the main access for larger commercial ships between Kattegat and most harbours around Limfjorden.
