= Norsminde Fjord =

Inlet on eastern Jutland, Denmark

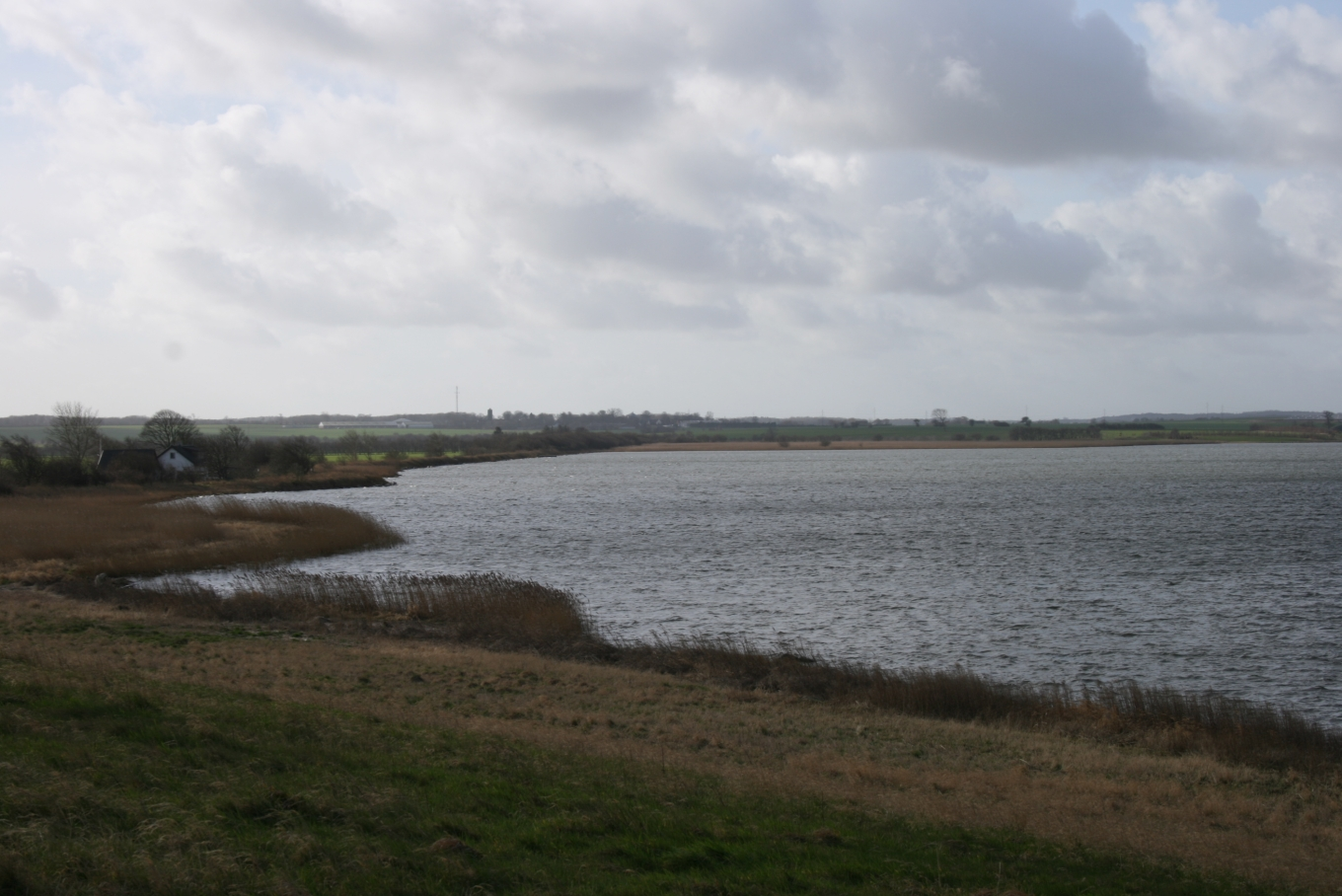
- Norsminde Fjord

- Location within Denmark
- Location: Jutland, Denmark
- Coordinates: 56°01′03″N 10°14′24″E
- Type: Fjord
- Max. length: 3 kilometres (1.9 mi)
- Max. width: 700 metres (2,300 ft)
- Surface area: 356 hectares (880 acres)
- Average depth: 60 centimetres (24 in)
- Max. depth: 2 metres (6 ft 7 in)

Norsminde Fjord is an inlet on the east coast of peninsular Denmark at the village of Norsminde, some 20 kilometres (12 mi) south of Aarhus. The inlet is about 3 km (1.9 mi) long and 700 m (2,300 ft) at the widest point and is shared between Aarhus and Odder Municipality.

The south section of Norsminde Fjord has been drained and is today coastal meadows, marsh or wetlands with rushes, mainly used for grazing animals. It is these wetlands in the south of the fjord that is known as Kysing Fjord which is Natura 2000 site (no. 59) and European Union Special Protection Areas bird sanctuary (no. 30). The bird sanctuary has a special focus on the whooper swan but other rare birds also nest in the area.

== History ==
Norsminde Fjord is an East Jutland Fjord, a glacial moraine valley, created during the Weichselian glaciation c. 20,000 to 70,000 years ago. The stream Rævs Å flows into the fjord and over time it has suffered silting and become increasingly shallow. In 1832 the southern part of the fjord was drained and made into farmland or wet meadows for animal grazing. In 1942 the remaining fjord and surrounding meadows were designated a wilderness preserve. However, the drained lands proved fertile and a good investment so in the 1950s it was attempted to drain the rest of the fjord. The draining effort failed and instead a sluice was installed to control water levels and flooding. The areas that were drained is today known as Kysing Fjord, 170 hectares (420 acres) of drained wetlands consisting mostly of wet and coastal meadows. The area has suffered damage from fertilizer runoff and wastewater from Odder and Malling over the years, causing issues with algae blooms that displace vegetation and animals. Kysing Fjord is today a natural preserve.

== Nature preserve ==
Many species of birds are found at the fjord and the inner wetlands, but the nature preservation has a special focus on the whooper swan. This is a migratory bird, which eats underwater vegetation and forages on wintergreen meadows. During mild winters, the whooper swan stays in the area from April to November; as many as 12,000 birds have been recorded here. The number of swans wintering in the area has risen over the years, possibly as a result of milder winters or an enlarged area suitable for foraging. In and around the fjord, the most common species of birds are eurasian coot, northern lapwing, eurasian wigeon, mallard, golden plover, tufted duck, eurasian teal, mute swan, a number of waders and, during cold winters, the common merganser. White-tailed eagles and peregrine falcons also have a presence in the area; both of these are very rare and endangered birds in Denmark. The dominant species at Norsminde Fjord are dabbling ducks, a result of the large amount of surface algae caused by previous years' nutrient pollution from poor wastewater management and fertilizer runoff.

== Gallery ==
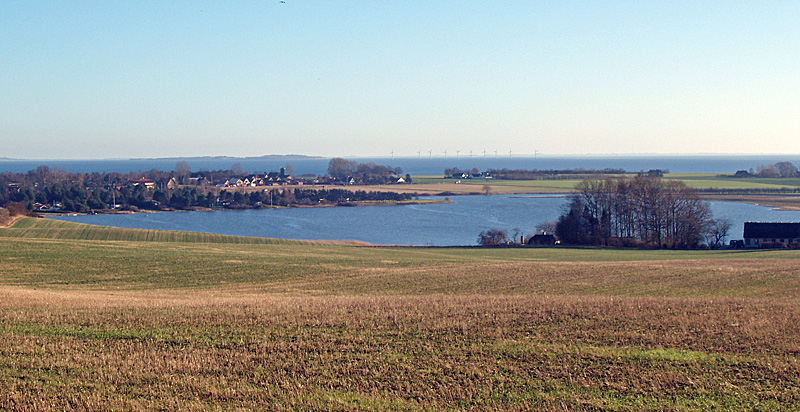
Norsminde Fjord viewed towards the Bay of Aarhus, with the village of Norsminde at the seaside.

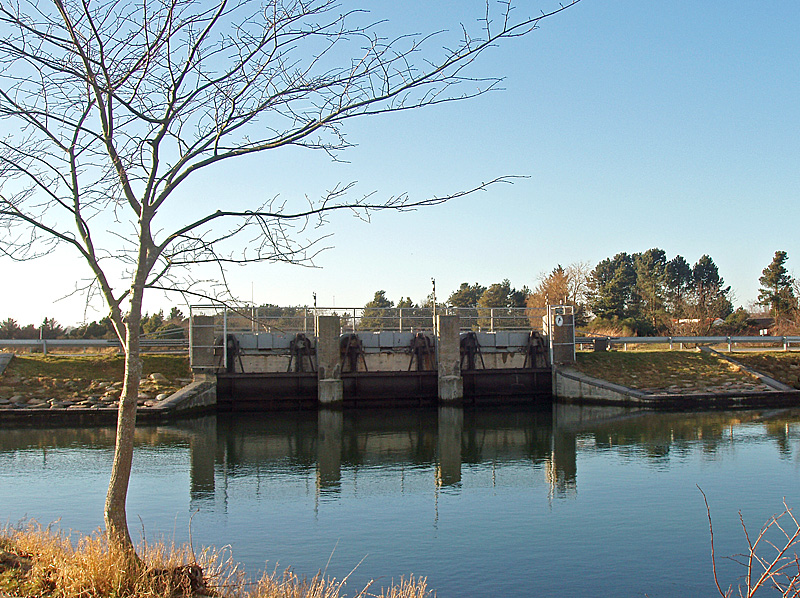
The sluice and bridge barring the lake from the sea.

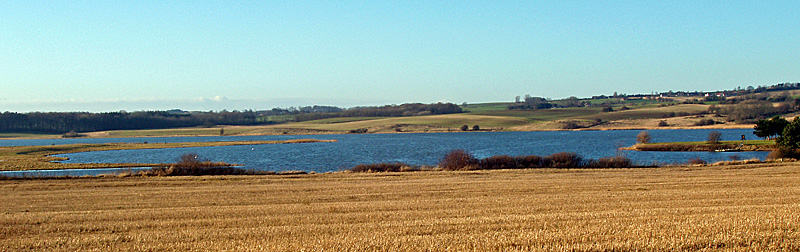
Norsminde Fjord and surrounding landscape.

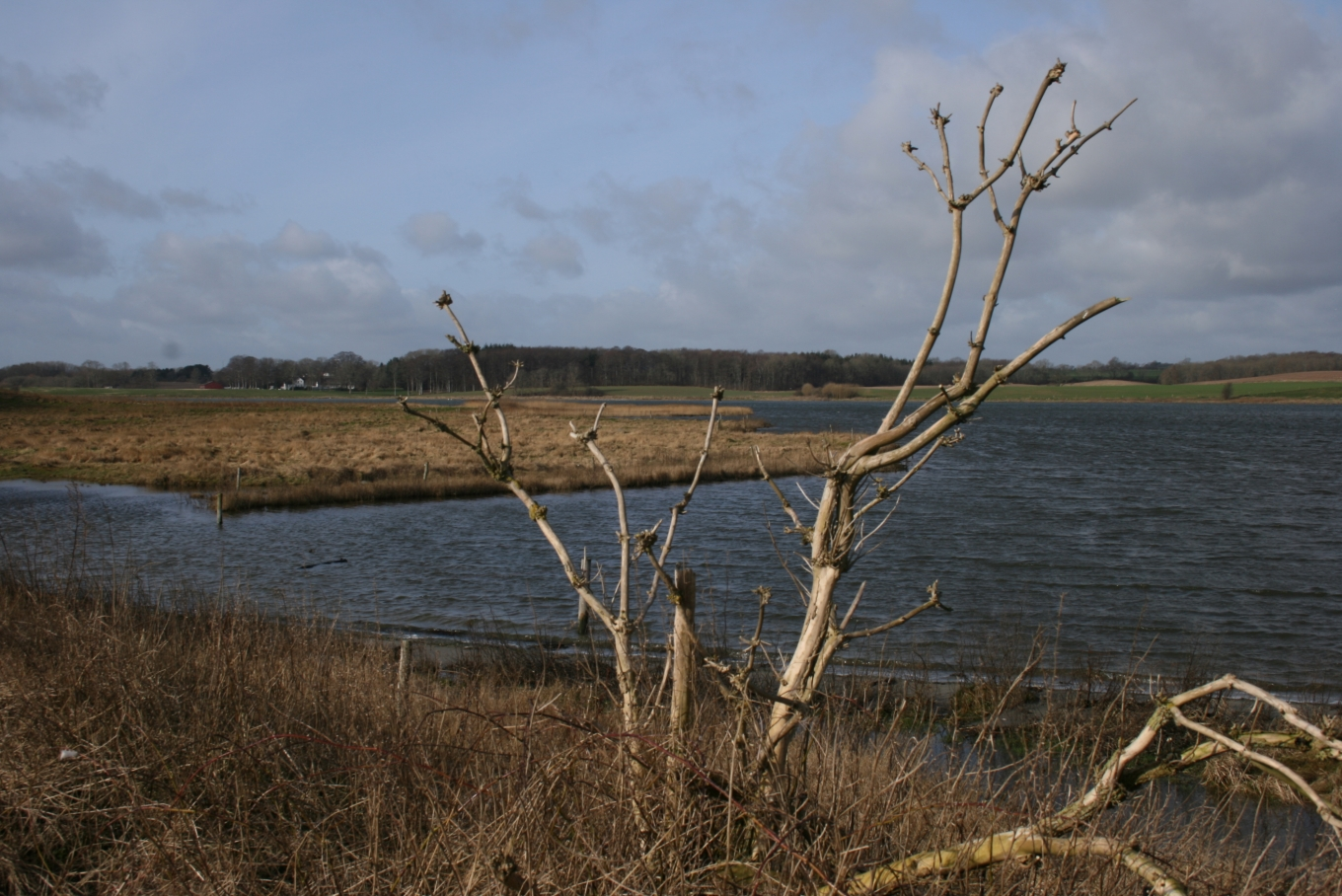
Reed beds and periodically submerged islets at the lake.
