= Birha River =

River in the Eastern Cape, South Africa

33°23′00″S 27°19′33″E

Birha River, is a short river originating north of Eleqolweni, Eastern Cape, South Africa, the river mouth is at Begha (between Port Alfred and East London).

In 1858 the steam ship Madagascar of the Rennie line was lost after she hit a reef near the mouth of the Birha River, around midnight on 3 December. Attempts to keep the ship afloat failed and she was run aground on the 4th and broke up. There were no deaths.
