= Horsens Fjord =

Fjord in Denmark

Coordinates: 55°51′N 10°0′E

Designations

Ramsar Wetland
- Official name: Horsens Fjord and Endelave
- Designated: 2 September 1977
- Reference no.: 152

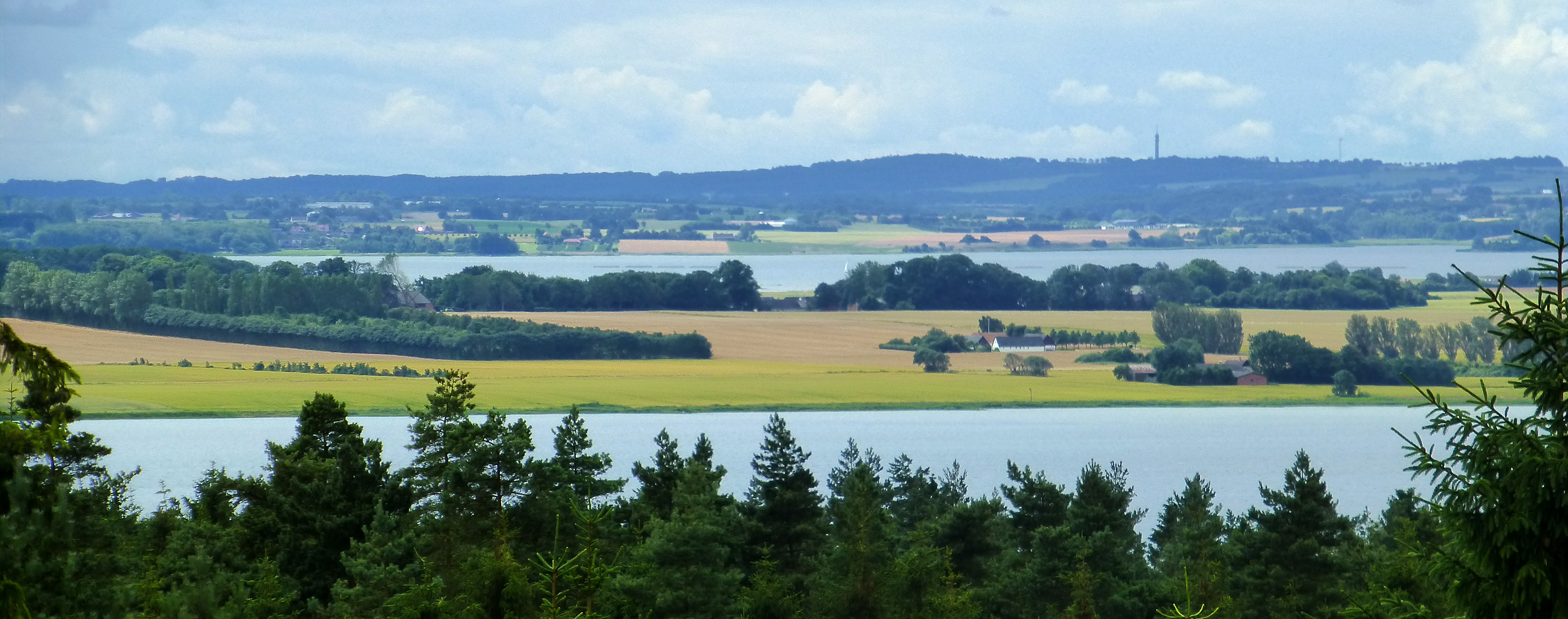
Horsens Fjord, a southward view from the hill of Blakshøj

Horsens Fjord is an East Jutland-type fjord in the east coast of the Danish peninsula of Jutland which stretches from the islands of Alrø and Hjarnø in the east to the town of Horsens on the mainland. It is some 20 kilometres (12 mi) long. The navigational channel to Horsens has a depth of 7 metres (23 ft).

The islands in the fjord are low-lying with grasslands and lagoons along their coasts. Both Alrø and Hjarnø consist principally of farmland while Vorsø, which has been an unpopulated nature reserve for over 50 years, is now wooded and has a colony of herons. There are also many cormorants in the area.

== Protections ==
Horsens Fjord forms a 42,737 ha Ramsar protection together with the island of Endelave and surrounding sea. The protection was put into force on 2 September 1977 and has number 152.

== See also ==
- Horsens
- Nakskov Fjord
