= Madagascar (1855 ship) =

Ship owned by John T. Rennie

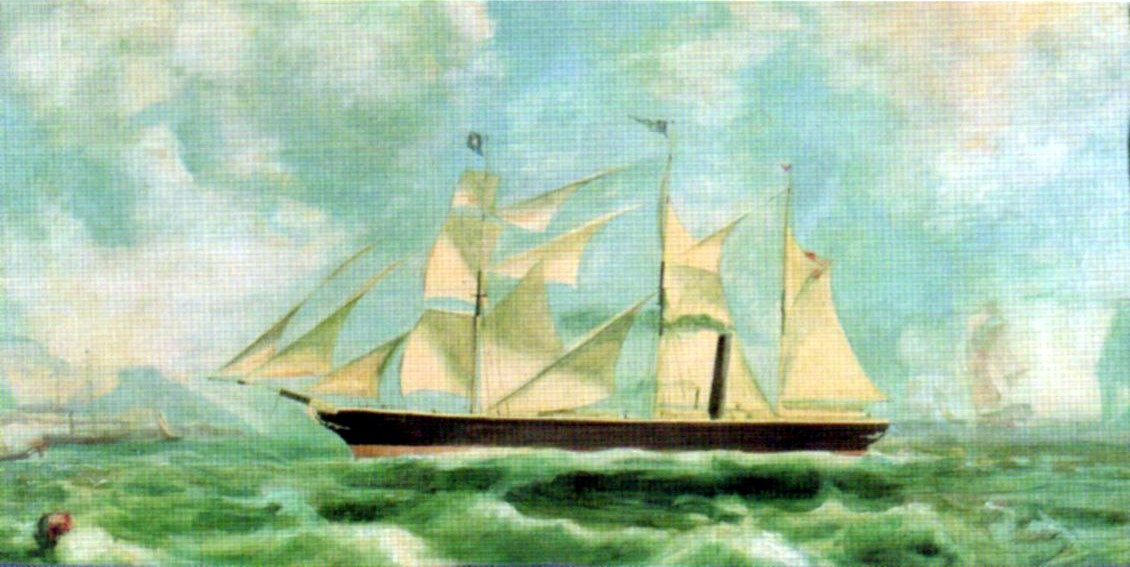
Madagascar

The Madagascar was a ship of the Rennie line that was lost in 1858 after it hit a reef near the mouth of the Birha River, south of East London, in South Africa, around midnight on 3 December. Attempts to keep the ship afloat failed and it was run aground on the 4th and broke up. There were no deaths.
