= Hjarnø =

Island in Denmark

- Location within Denmark Location within Central Denmark Region

Geography
- Location: Kattegat
- Coordinates: 55°49′30″N 10°5′0″E
- Area: 3.2 km^{2} (1.2 sq mi)

Administration
- Denmark
- Region: Central Denmark Region
- Municipality: Hedensted Municipality

Demographics
- Population: 104 (2013)

Hjarnø is a small Danish island at the mouth of Horsens Fjord on the east coast of Jutland in Hedensted Municipality.

== Geography ==
The island is about 3 kilometres (1.9 mi) long with an area of 3.21 square kilometres (1.24 sq mi), and a population of 104 (as of 10 July 2013). Its coastline extends 11 km (6.8 mi) and its highest point measures 7 metres (23 ft). The land consists mainly of marshes and sandbanks. Hjarnø is surrounded by Hjarnø Sound, where the water is 20–22 m (66–72 ft) deep. On Hjarnø, the main road runs from the eastern tip of the island to the western one. The road is lined by the island’s farms. The buildings along the road are the oldest on the island, while the newer buildings, dating from the 20th century, are located between the harbor and the church. Within the town, there is a community center, a former dairy, a former school, a campground, a restaurant, and residential houses.

== Economy ==
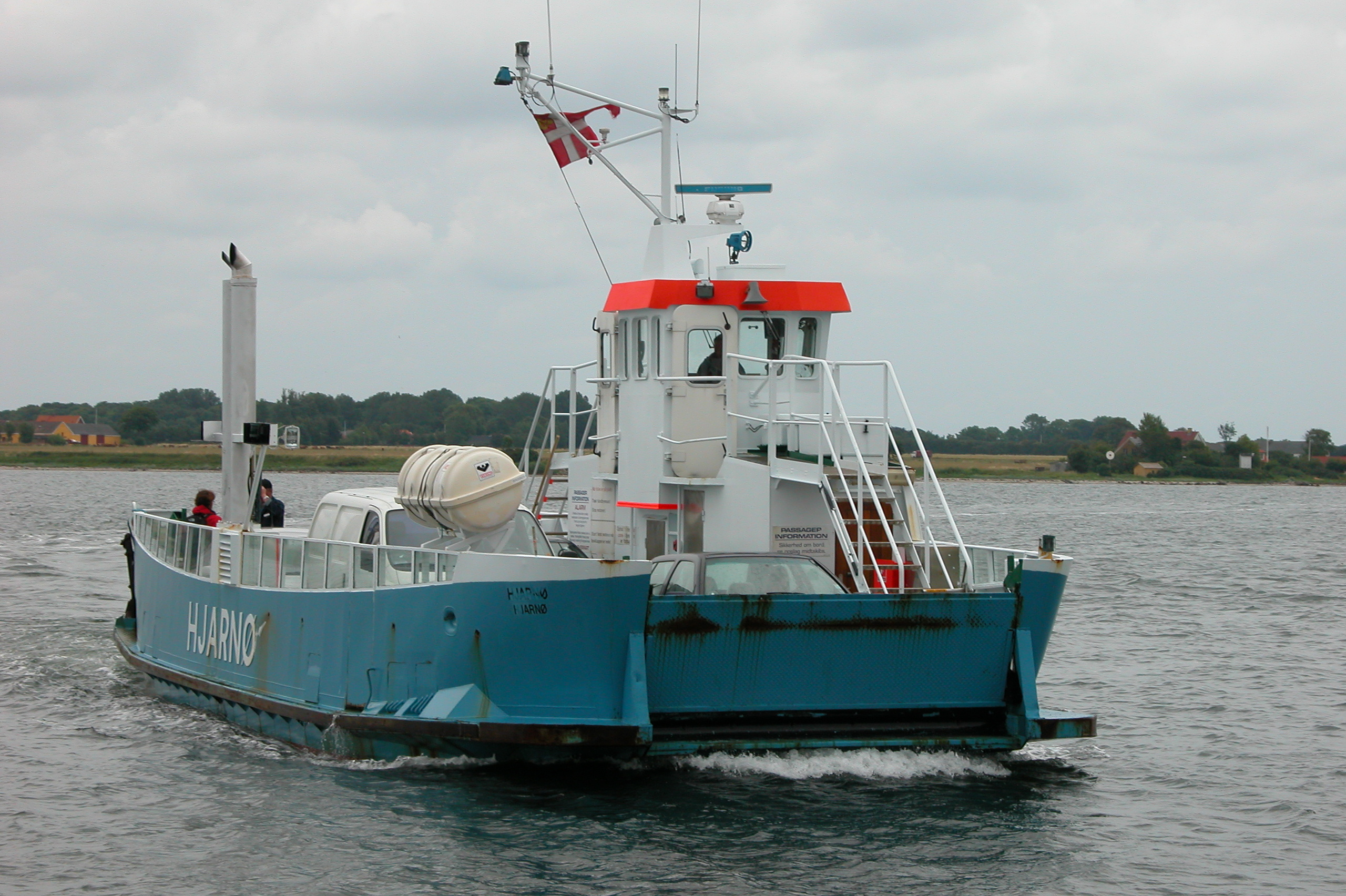
Hjarnø ferry

Hjarnø’s economy consists mainly of two components: agriculture and tourism. The soil is quite fertile and most of the island is cultivated land. Tourists visiting Hjarnø can engage in a variety of activities, including fishing, swimming, surfing, bird watching, and experiencing the history of the island by visiting its archaeological sites. To reach Hjarnø, Småøernes Færgeselskaber (Small Island Ferries Operators) operates a ferry that runs between Snaptun, located on the mainland, and Hjarnø. The ferry runs 25 times daily. The boat measures 17.9 m (59 ft) by 6.3 m (21 ft) and was built in 1987.

== Places of interest ==
=== Church ===
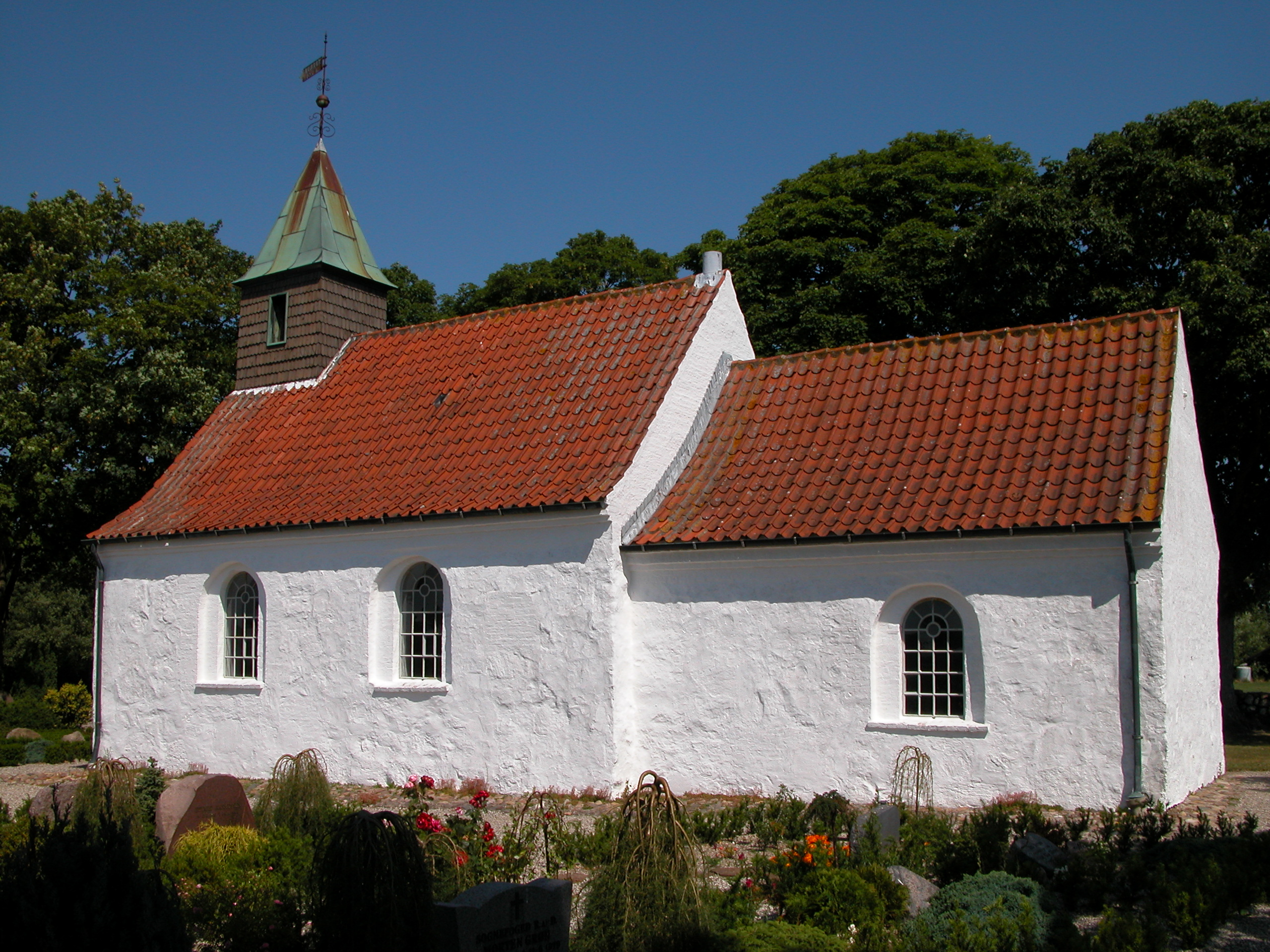
Hjarnø Church

The church on Hjarnø is one of the smallest churches in the country; it currently serves 87 parishioners. The church building appears to date from the 16th century. Although it originally lacked a bell tower, one was added in 1877 with a bell dating from 1425. Within the church, the granite baptismal font is made in the Romanesque style and dates from the 12th century. The altarpiece was carved by Jens Hiernøe in 1805. Hanging from the ceiling, there is also a model Viking ship, which was donated to the church by the Glud Museum in 1955.

=== Archaeological sites ===
Hjarnø is notable for two sites of archaeological interest. First, its coastline, which exhibits evidence of Mesolithic Stone Age settlements of people of the Ertebølle culture (5200-3800 BCE), and second, the Viking Age ship setting called Kalvestenene, located at the southeast corner of the island.

==== Stone Age site ====
Along the coast of Hjarnø, archaeologists have discovered several finds that indicate previous coastline settlement by people of the Mesolithic Stone Age. Due to changes in the shoreline caused by the end of the Ice Age, many of these settlements were submerged and therefore preserved. Although the relieved weight of the melted ice has led to most of Denmark’s shores rising, around Horsens Fjord, which sits in an area that is sinking due to fracture lines in the earth’s plates, the coastline is instead falling. This depression of the coastline has resulted in the trapping of many artifacts in an anaerobic environment, called the gyttja, which led to their preservation through the centuries. In the past few decades, erosion along the seabed has been exposing previously covered Stone Age sites, a process that is evident at Hjarnø.

In 2008, Peter Astrup, of the University of Aarhus, during a survey of a previously known submerged Stone Age site along the coast of Hjarnø, noticed that erosion had exposed many layers of the gyttja. In further exploring the site, he discovered a number of finds from the Stone Age. Following this, the University of Aarhus, the Moesgård Museum, and the Horsens Museum cooperated in excavating the site. The conclusion was that the site was likely from the Ertebølle period and had been settled due to its convenient location with regards to fishing. Finds at the site included three wooden paddles made of ash wood, an antler axe, a dugout canoe, and a bow made of elmwood. There were also numerous stakes made of hazel wood, hazelnut shells, plant seeds, string, and flint flakes and tools.

Carbon-14 analysis of the paddles dates them to about 4700-4540 BCE, which places them in the mid-Ertebølle culture. All three paddles show evidence of painted decoration, and one paddle has a series of cut marks, which is thought to be the result of beheading fish on the paddle. Using carbon-14 analysis, the bow was also dated and found to have come from a slightly earlier period than the paddles – 5200-5000 BCE. The bow is believed to have been about 1.66 m (5 ft 5 in) long, although only 1.35 m (4 ft 5 in) survives to the present day. Concerning the canoe, it was too large to be excavated given time and budget constraints, so it has been covered with fibertex linen until it can be excavated at a later date.

==== Kalvestenene ====
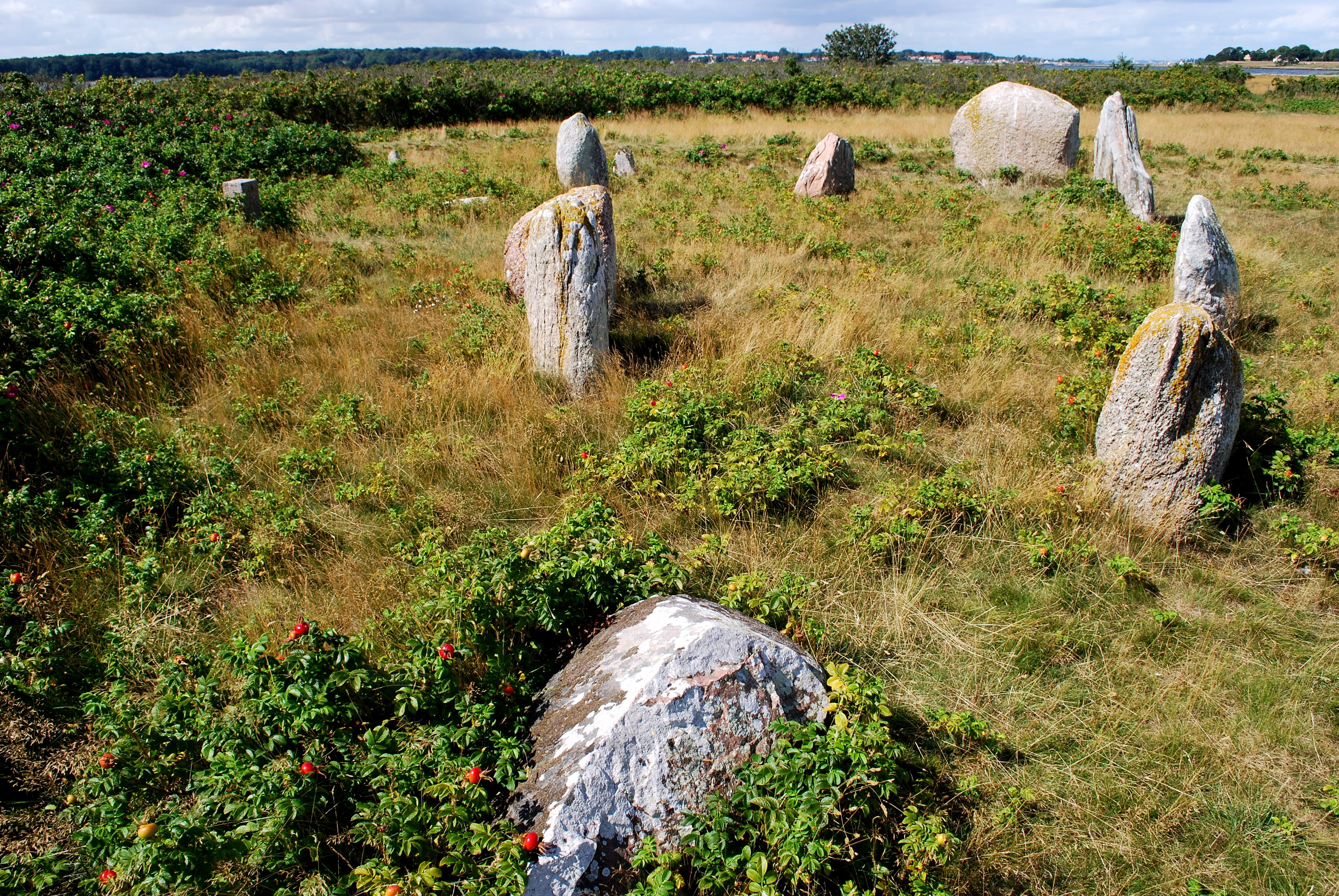
The Kalvestene

The Kalvestene is a ship setting located at the southeastern corner of Hjarnø. It is a cremation burial site, dating to the Viking Age. The site was known to the 12th/13th-century Danish historian, Saxo Grammaticus, who recorded a legend about its origins in his Gesta Danorum. It is unlikely that Saxo ever visited the site personally, and rather learned about it from travelers and regional tradition. Drawings by Ole Worm done in the 17th century indicate that there were once 34 stones. However, over time, residents of Hjarnø removed stones for other purposes, for example, the Kriger Monument in Fredericia. There are now 10 gravestones remaining. In 1935, the National Museum excavated two of the graves. The finds included shards of iron and charcoal, as well as pottery shards that have been dated to about 600-900 CE. After the excavation, the remaining stones were raised on foundations.

== See also ==
- List of islands of Denmark
