= Timeline of Aarhus =

The following is a timeline of the history of the city of Aarhus, a city in central Denmark.

== Viking Age ==
- 750–800 – Aarhus is founded by the northern shore of the Aarhus River.
- c. 900 – The first church, the Holy Trinity Church, is built during the reign of Frode, King of Jutland.
- c. 900 – Gorm the Old fortifies Aarhus with ramparts.
- 10th century – Harald Bluetooth strengthens and expands the ramparts.
- 948 – First mention of Aarhus as the bishop of Aarhus Reginbrand attends the Synod of Ingelheim.
- 988 – Diocese of Aarhus is dissolved.
- 1035–42 – Harthacnut coins money stamped with the original name of Aarhus: "AROS".
- 1043
  - Svend Estridsen gains support from Aros in war against Magnus the Good and a battle between the two are fought in the Bay of Aarhus.
  - Magnus the Good becomes ruler of Aarhus for a period and coins money inscribed "Magnus Konge, Lif-sig i Aros" in Latin.
- 1050 – Harald Hardrada attacks Aarhus and burns the settlement including the Holy Trinity Church.
- 1060
  - Diocese of Aarhus is reestablished as Svend Estridsen divides the country into 8 bishoprics.
  - Crypt church is constructed on the site of the former Holy Trinity Church and present day Church of Our Lady.

== Middle Ages ==
- 1080 – The crypt church is expanded and dedicated to Saint Nicholas.
- 12th century
  - The bishopric begins collecting tithe.
  - The defensive ramparts are strengthened and a cobbled ring road built along it.
- 1134 – The bishop of Aarhus Ulkil is killed at the Battle of Fotevik in support of King Niels.
- 1180
  - Saint Nicholas Church mentioned as the first cathedral of Aarhus.
  - Niels of Aarhus dies and is buried in Aarhus.
- 1191 – Peder Vognsen is appointed bishop by King Canute VI.
- c. 1192 – Construction begins on Aarhus Cathedral on the burial site of Niels of Aarhus.
- 1195 – Aarhus Cathedral School is mentioned for the first time. The school possibly predates the Aarhus Cathedral.
- 13th century – Valdemar II builds a grain mill at Aarhus River and hand grinders are made illegal.
- c. 1250 – Dominican friars are given Saint Nicholas Church which they tear down and begins construction on Church of Our Lady.
- 1298 – King Eric VI grants the Diocese of Aarhus rent from the peasantry enlisted in leidang.
- 1441 – Christopher of Bavaria ratifies existing market town privileges.
- 1477 –
  - Christian I grants citizens of Aarhus rights to fisheries in Lillebælt, Kalø Vig and Jutland.
  - The defensive ramparts ringing the town since the Viking age are removed.
- 1483 – King Hans ratifies that citizens of Aarhus are free of duties and may trade in all markets in Jutland.
- 1496 – King Hans ratifies that citizens of Aarhus may use all fisheries in Jutland.

== Renaissance 16th – 18th century ==
- 1505 – King Hans establishes a four-mile exclusion zone around Aarhus within which only citizens may trade with farmers.
- 1542 – Large fires break out destroying parts of present Indre By.
- 1546 – Parts of the city burns down as fires breaks out.
- 1556 – Large fires breaks out.
- 1627-1629 – Aarhus is occupied by Albrecht von Wallenstein's troops on behest of Ferdinand II during the Thirty Years' War.
- 1637 – Thors Mølle is constructed as a powder mill.
- 1644-1645 – Occupation by Swedish troops during the Torstenson War
- 1657 – Wooden city walls erected as octroi is introduced.
- 1657-1659 – Aarhus is occupied during the Dano-Swedish wars of 1657–58 and 1658–60.
- 1659
  - Aarhus is bombarded by 13 Swedish warships during the Dano-Swedish War of 1658–60.
  - Plague breaks out in the city. Nationwide, a third of the population is killed.
- 1662 – The medieval fiefs reformed into counties and Aarhus County is established.
- 1672 – 3,474 inhabitants.
- 1740 – New citizens council established, composed of the wealthiest citizens.
- 1794 – Århus Stiftstidende is published for the first time.

== 19th century ==
- 1801 – 3,837 inhabitants.
- 1830
  - Regular steamship links with Copenhagen begins.
  - Vennelystparken opens for the first time.
- 1838 – Electoral rules changed to allow voting for the city council.
- 1840 – 7,087 inhabitants.
  - Harbor moved from the Aarhus river to the coast.
- 1849
  - Occupied by Prussian troops during the First Schleswig War.
  - The skirmish known as Rytterfægtningen is fought in the area of present-day Trøjborg.
  - Denmark gets constitution and new electoral laws. The greater half of citizens representatives to be elected by all citizens while the other half is elected by the highest taxed citizens.
- 1850 – The psychiatric hospital of Jydske Asyl opens.
- 1851 – 11,009 inhabitants.
  - Octroi abolished and the city walls removed.
- 1854 – Frichs company is established.
- 1856 – The Ceres Brewery is established.
- 1862 – Jutland's first railway established between Aarhus and Randers.
- 1864 – Aarhus is occupied by Prussian troops during the Second Schleswig War.
- 1869 – Citizen Representation reformed to a city council with 19 members elected for 6 years. 10 members elected by all citizens, 9 by the highest taxed.
- 1871
  - Aarhus Oliefabrik A/S is established.
  - Jyllands-Posten publishes its first paper.
- 1873 – Cholera kills 213.
- 1874 – Frederiksbjerg annexed.
- 1875 – Aarhus Botanical Gardens is constructed.
- 1876 – The Grenaa Line opens; connecting Aarhus to Grenå by rail.
- 1880 – 24,831 inhabitants.
- 1882 – Aarhus County Hospital founded.
- 1883
  - Aarhus Butterine Company is established.
  - First public transportation in the form of horse drawn carriages.
- 1884 – The rail line Odderbanen opens, connecting Aarhus to Odder.
- 1893 – Aarhus Municipal Hospital is founded.
- 1896
  - Korn- og Foderstof Kompagniet is established.
  - Marselisborg estate purchased.
  - Construction on Trøjborg begins.
- 1900 – Aarhus Theatre is completed.

== 20th century ==
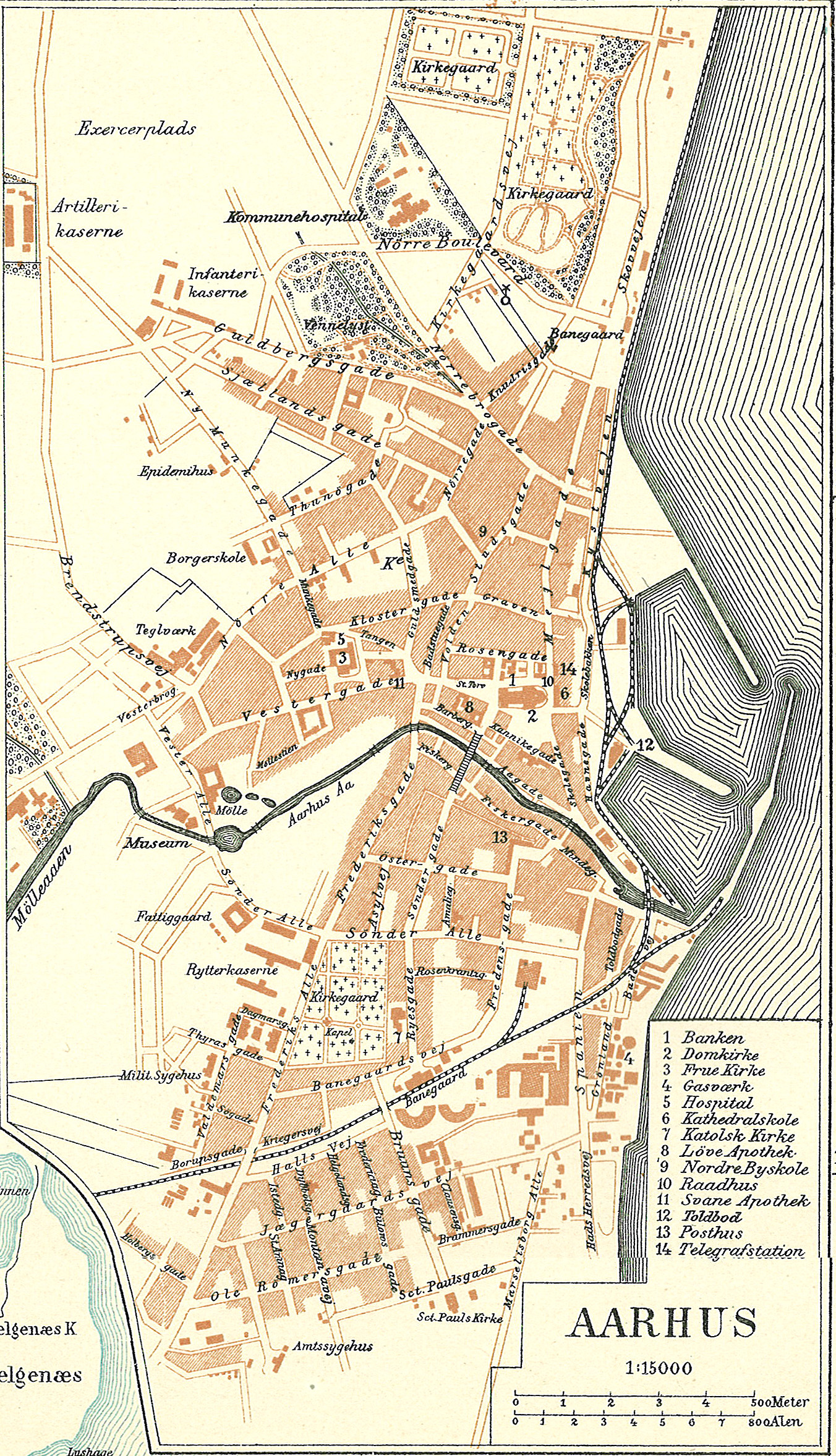
A city map of Aarhus in 1900, (Danish language edition)

- 1901 – 51,814 inhabitants.
- 1902
  - The State Library is finished. The historicist building was later repurposed as Erhvervsarkivet (The Corporate Archives) in 1948.
  - Marselisborg Palace is established.
- 1904 – Tivoli Friheden starts as an amusement park.
- 1906 – Frederik Ferdinand Salling opens the store that will eventually grow to become the Salling department store.
- 1909
  - Aarhus hosts the National Exhibition of 1909.
  - Electoral periods for the city council changed to 4 years, privileged electoral system abolished and women given voting rights.
- 1911 – 64,607 inhabitants.
- 1912 – Den Gamle By is established.
- 1913 – Marselisborg Hospital opens.
- 1919 – First publicly elected mayor.
- 1921 – 86,197 inhabitants.
- 1925 – Mindeparken is established.
- 1928
  - Aarhus University is opened.
  - Aarhus Sporveje is established.
- 1929 – The Central Station is completed.
- 1930 – 101,423 inhabitants.
- 1931 – Spanien Public Baths opens.
- 1932
  - Marselisborg Deer Park is established.
  - University Park is established.
- 1933
  - The first university buildings opens
  - Den Permanente is established.
- 1937 – The ring road of Ring 1 is finished.
- 1940 – 126,459 inhabitants.

=== World War II ===
- 10 April 1940 – Aarhus occupied by invading German troops.
- 1941
  - The Aarhus City Hall by architect Arne Jacobsen is completed.
  - The Royal Air Force bombs a viaduct in Viby.
- 24 September 1942 – The Aarhus oil mill is bombed by the Royal Air Force.
- 3 July 1943 – The resistance bombs and destroys the viaduct at Spanien.
- 4 July 1944 – German barge loaded with ammunition explodes in the harbor killing 38.
- 22 August 1944 – Aarhus Sporveje tram depot on Dalgas Avenue is blown up in an act of schalburgtage.
- 10 October 1944 – German steamer Scharnhörn bombed by the resistance movement.
- 30 September 1944 – Aarhus-Hallen is bombed killing 5 people.
- 9 October 1944 – The Peter group destroys the building of the newspaper Demokraten.
- 31 October 1944 – The Gestapo headquarters in Aarhus University is bombed by the Royal Air Force.
- 11 November 1944 – Five buildings on Ryesgade are destroyed by the Peter group.
- 12 November 1944 – Buildings in Søndergade 10–14, 23- 27, 29 and 58-60 are bombed.
- 2 December 1944 – Aarhus Håndværkerforening is bombed killing 1 person.
- 21 January 1945 – Vennelyst Teateret (Vennelyst Theatre) in Vennelystparken is bombed.
- 22 February 1945 – The Peter group bombs Guldsmedgade, Nørregade, Ryesgade and Aarhus Theatre killing 8 people.
- 13 March 1945 – Risskovtoget (Risskov Train) is bombed killing two people.
- 29 March 1945 – Editor of Århus Stiftstidende Børge Schmidt is shot and killed in a clearing murder.
- 5 May 1945 – Fighting between resistance fighters and German forces refusing surrender claims 15 lives.
- 8 May 1945 – British troops enter and officially liberate Aarhus from German occupation.

=== Post-war ===
- 1945 – Aarhus Flydedok is established.
- 1948 – Erhvervsarkivet (The Corporate Archives) opens in the building formerly housing the State Library.
- 1950 – 153,546 inhabitants.
  - City management of Aarhus is changed to a Magistrate.
- 1960 – 177,234 inhabitants.
  - First direct elections of county council.
- 1963 – The landmark State and University Library tower and building in yellow brick at the university campus is finished.
- 1965 – The first Aarhus Festuge festival is held.
- 1968 – Construction of the Gellerup Plan, a large modernist suburban satellite city, begins.
- 1970 – 199,427 inhabitants.
  - Aarhus Municipality is merged with a number of surrounding municipalities during the 1970 Danish Municipal Reform
- 1975 – The anti-nuclear Smiling Sun logo is designed by the local group of Organisationen til Oplysning om Atomkraft.
- 1977 – The first Moesgård Vikingetræf event is held.
- 1979 – Machine manufacturing company Frichs, a large local employer, is declared bankrupt. Production in Aarhus was finally halted, after more than 125 years, in the 1980s.
- 1982 – Musikhuset (Aarhus Concert Hall) is finished
- 1983 – Gaffa is published for the first time.
- 1987 – The ring road of Ring 2 opens.
- 1988
  - University hospital Skejby Sygehus opens.
  - The afforestation of the New Forests of Aarhus is initiated.
- 1989 – The first Aarhus International Jazz Festival.
- 1990 – 200,188 inhabitants.
- 1991
  - KaosPilots is founded by Uffe Elbæk.
  - Marselisborg Yacht Harbour opens
- 1994 – The first SpoT Festival is held.
- 1995 – Scandinavian Center is finished
- 2000 – 217,260 inhabitants.

== 21st century ==
=== The 2000s ===
- 2002
  - Louise Gade becomes the first woman and non-Social Democratic mayor of Aarhus.
  - The re-establishment of Årslev Engsø begins.
- 2003
  - The dockyard of Aarhus Flydedok closes after 58 years, following a bankruptcy.
  - Bruun's Galleri shopping mall opens.
- 2004 – ARoS art museum opens
- 2005 – The nature sites of Hasle Hills and Skjoldhøjkilen are inaugurated.
- 2006 – 228,674 inhabitants.
  - The lake of Egå Engsø is created.
- 2007
  - Construction begins on Aarhus Ø.
  - Aarhus County is dissolved and Aarhus becomes part of Central Denmark Region.
- 2008 – The Ceres Brewery closed production in Aarhus after 152 years.
- 2009
  - Sculpture by the Sea is held for the first time.
  - The first Northside Festival is held.

=== The 2010s ===
- 2011
  - City council elects to change spelling from "Århus" to "Aarhus".
  - Aarhus University Hospital is created.
- 2012
  - Aarhus Pride is held for the first time.
  - Construction begins on CeresByen.
- 2013 – 256,018 inhabitants.
  - Construction begins on Aarhus Letbane (Aarhus light rail)
- 2014
  - The new Moesgård Museum (MOMU) opens.
  - The New University Hospital (DNU) partly opens to become fully operational in 2020.
  - Aarhus City Tower, the second tallest building in the city at 94 metres, opens.
- 2015
  - Dokk1 opens.
  - Redevelopment of Frederiks Plads begins.
- 2017
  - Aarhus is European Capital of Culture
  - The inner harbour front and two squares of Hack Kampmanns Plads and Havnepladsen are finished.
  - Aarhus Letbane opens
- 2018 – 273,077 inhabitants
  - The harbour baths of Havnebadet opens
  - The New University Hospital (DNU) is finished
  - Aarhus County Hospital is closed after 136 years of service
  - Risskov Psychiatric Hospital (Jydske Asyl) is closed after 168 year of service
- 2019
  - Aarhus Municipal Hospital is closed after 125 years of service

=== The 2020s ===
- 2023
  - Lighthouse highrise is finished; the tallest residential building in Denmark at the time (143 m).

== See also ==
- Mayors of Aarhus (since 1919)
- Timelines of other cities in Denmark: Copenhagen
