= Marselisborg Hospital =

MarselisborgCentret
- Central Denmark Region

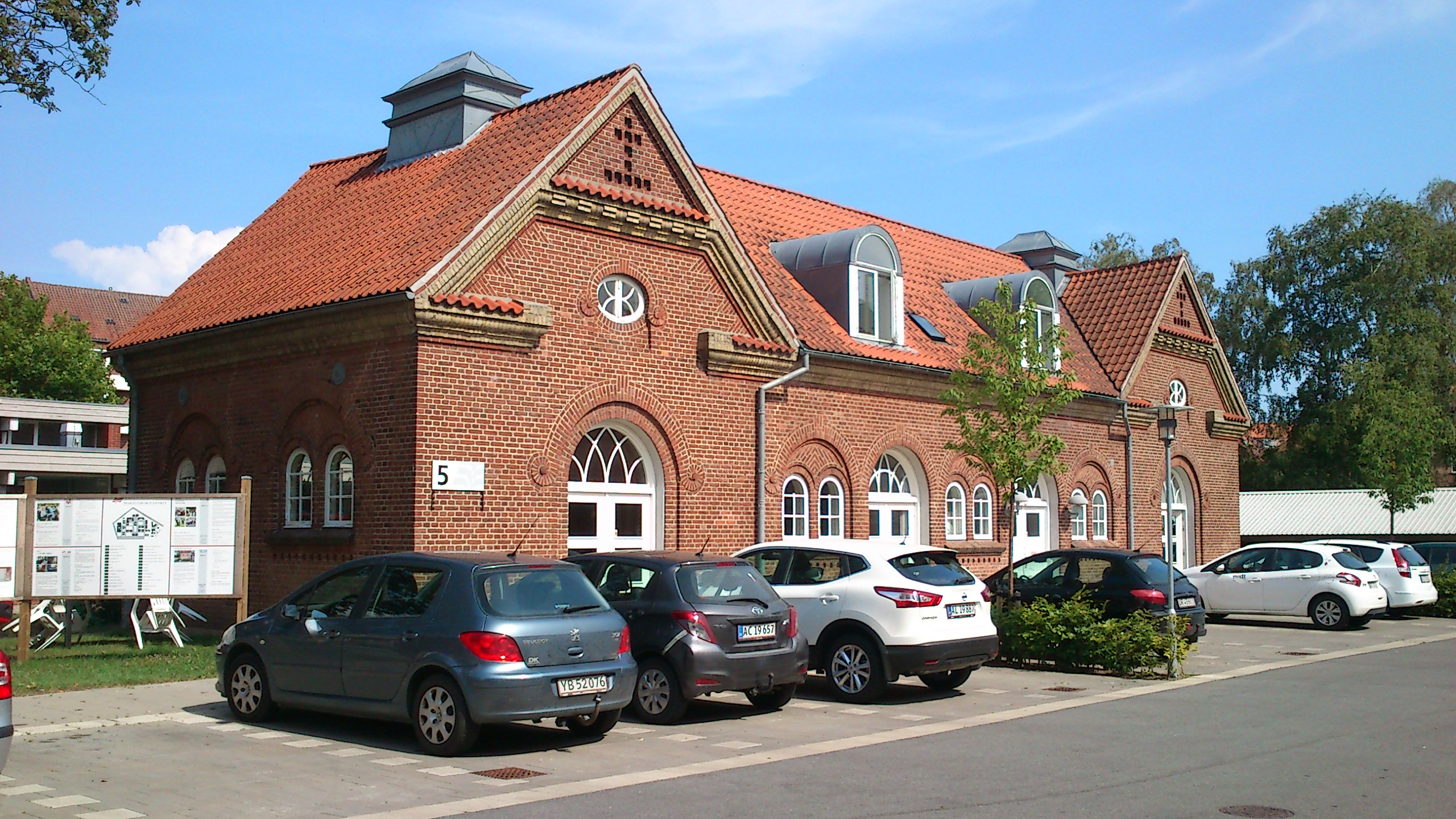
- Entrance to the Marselisborg Center

Geography
- Location: Aarhus, Central Region, Denmark
- Coordinates: 56°08′26.6″N 10°11′17.5″E

Organisation
- Type: rehabilitation
- Affiliated university: Aarhus University
- Network: Aarhus University Hospital

Helipads
- Helipad: no

History
- Founded: 1913

Links
- Website: www.marselisborgcentret.dk
- Lists: Hospitals in Denmark

Marselisborgcentret, formerly Marselisborg Hospital, is a rehabilitation hospital in Aarhus, situated on P. P. Ørums Gade in the borough of Marselisborg. The original hospital was established in 1913 and has been repurposed for rehabilitation, including related research and innovation, in 2001.

A project at the rehabilitation centre, known as Spark, aims at creating a local public meeting space for everybody, including the well-functioning. The Spark project includes a café and canteen, and communal projects in the associated Rehabilitation Park.

== History ==
Marselisborg Hospital was originally Aarhus' epidemiological hospital, replacing the former epidemiological hospital (from 1875) in Ny Munkegade, where Samsøgades School is situated today. The Marselisborg Hospital grounds was at the time of construction outside city limits, but rapid population growth in the late 19th century resulted in city expansion engulfing the hospital area. In 1901, the inhabitants of Ny Munkegades contacted the city council, concerned about the hospital and the possibility of contagious and infectious diseases. In 1907, the city council established a commission to look at the possibility of a new, larger hospital. The commission reviewed a number of locations but eventually decided on a site in Marselisborg outside the urban area. Construction of the new hospital began in 1910 and it was inaugurated on 31 May 1913.

Originally the new hospital had a budget of 600,000 DKK but in 1911, costs had ballooned to 856,000 DKK. One reason was that the city council had decided the hospital should have a department for skin and venereal diseases. When the hospital was finished, it had homes for two attending physicians for the two departments, one for diphtheria and scarlet fever and the other for skin and venereal diseases. The department for venereal diseases was segregated by gender and patients made to wear striped uniforms to clearly mark them from other patients. The first director of the hospital was also selected based on his past as a police officer.

The hospital quickly turned out to be too small to keep up with the growth of the city. The location was also isolated from the Municipal Hospital and the County Hospital which made it less useful for more complex treatments. The departments was gradually transferred to Skejby Sygehus and in 1992, Marselisborg Hospital ceased to operate as an independent institution. In 2001, the hospital closed entirely and was made a department of the new Aarhus University Hospital as the Marselisborg Center (MarselisborgCentret), the Danish Center for Rehabilitation and research.

== Architecture ==
Marselisborg Hospital is styled as 10 separate pavilions connected by hallways. The overall floor plan was drawn by the architect Ludvig Petersen and was intended to make it easier to control infectious diseases by separating patients as much as possible. The buildings was designed by the architect Thorkel Møller in National Romantic style. Between 1996 and 2001 a 1,600 square metres (17,000 sq ft) addition by C. F. Møller Architects was constructed.

== Rehabilitation Park ==
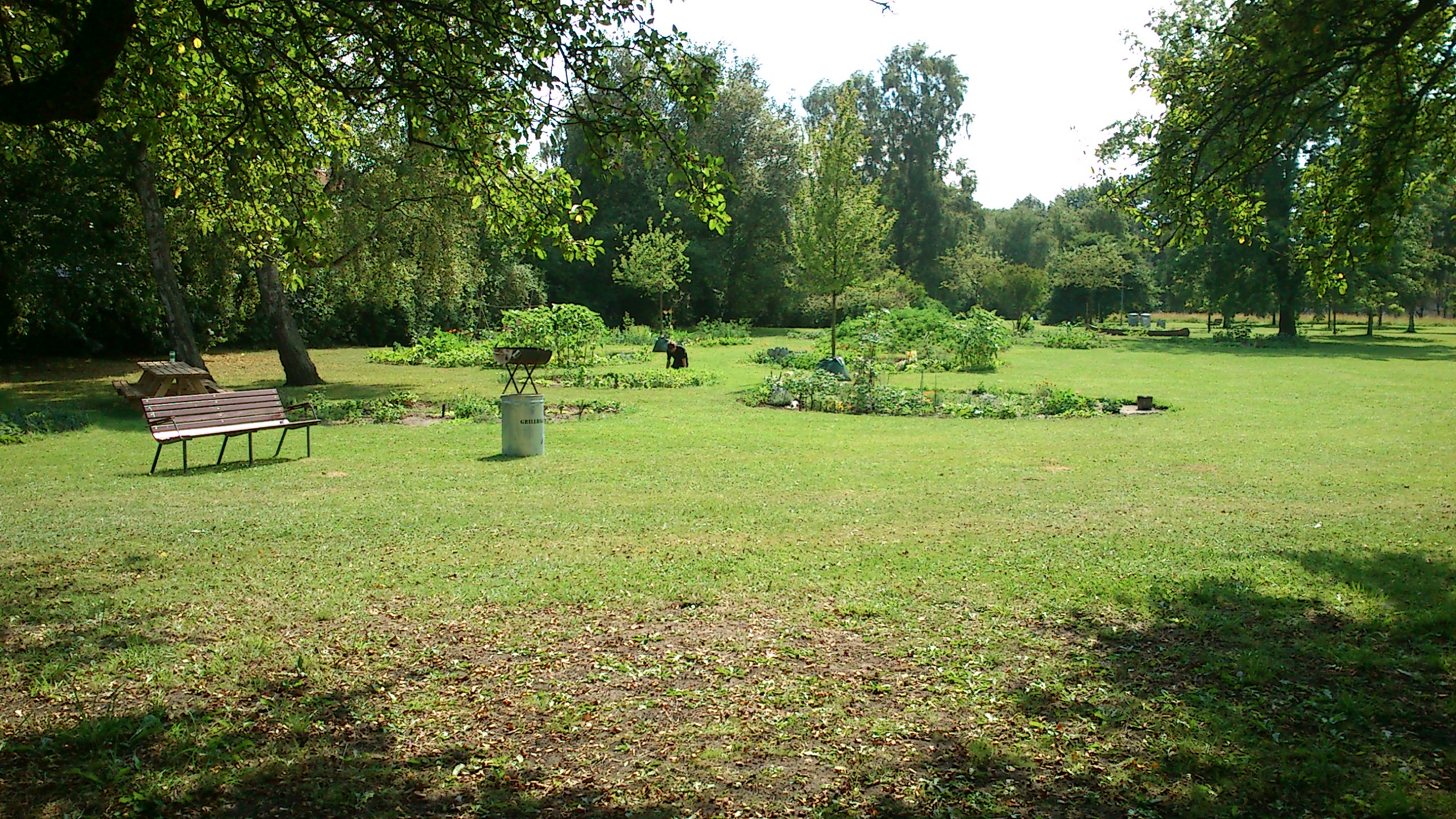
Vegetable gardens in Marselisborg Hospital Park.

Rehabiliteringsparken (The Rehabilitation Park), or Marselisborg Hospitalspark (Marselisborg Hospital Park), is a public park that was established in conjunction with the Marselisborg Hospital. At the time the hospital was built, most treatment was inpatient as opposed to modern practices that focus more on outpatient treatment. It was considered important that patients were given green spaces and fresh air as part of the treatment process and the park was established with that goal in mind. Today the Rehabilitation Park is public, covering roughly 4 acres of landscaped terrain. The terrain was originally flat but has had many small hills added while the trees date back to when the park was established and include fruit trees. Small plots of land in the park are allotted to citizens of Aarhus who wish to maintain a small garden.
