= Museum Ovartaci =

Coordinates: 56°11′08.8″N 10°13′56.6″E

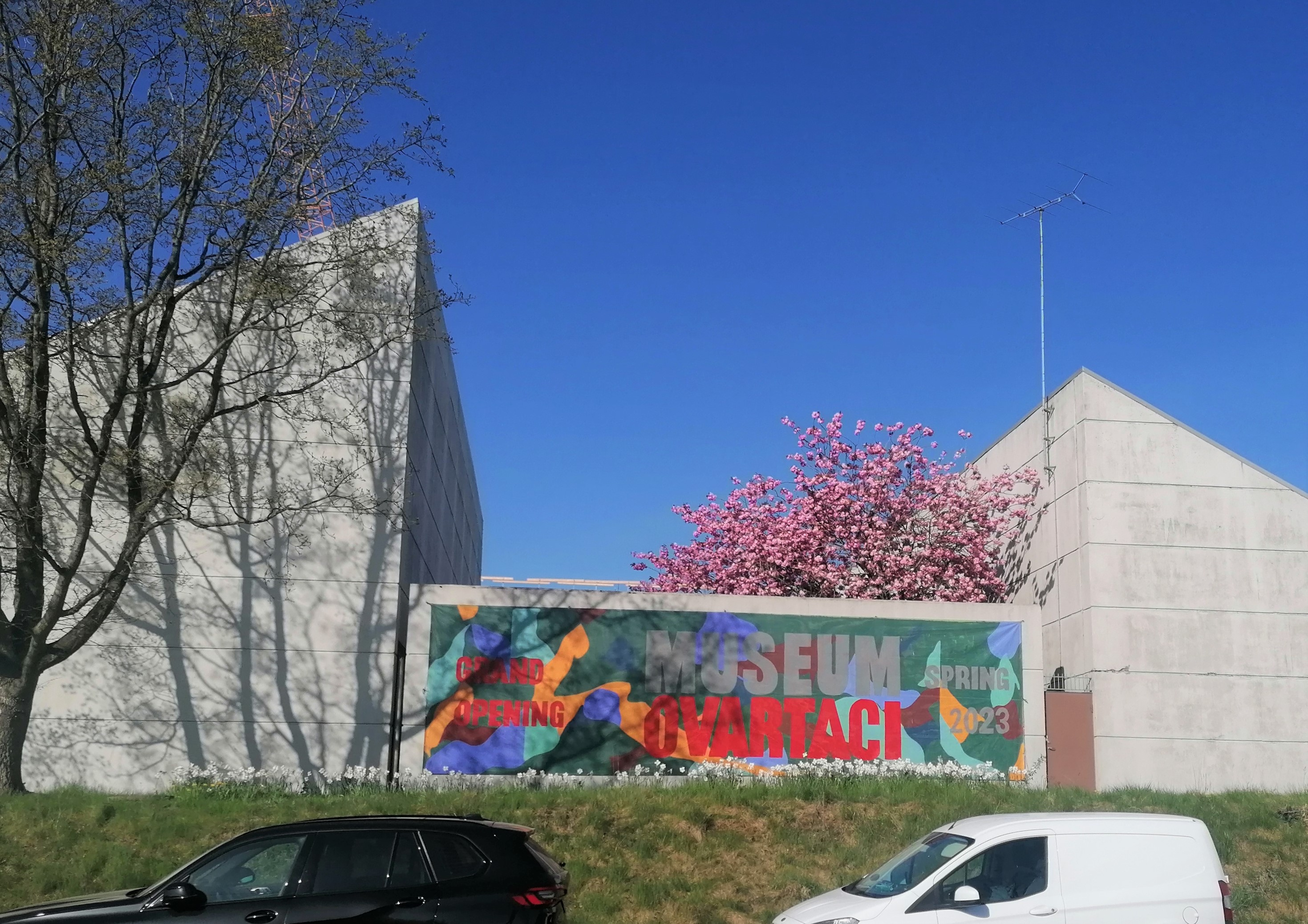
- Museum Ovartaci, Olof Palmes Allé
- Established: 1921
- Location: Olof Palmes Allé 11; Århus; Denmark
- Type: Art and psychiatric history museum
- Website: Museum Ovartaci

Museum Ovartaci in Aarhus, Denmark is a combined art and historical museum dedicated to the work of the artist Ovartaci, history of psychiatric treatment and art produced by patients at the Risskov Psychiatric Hospital. It was a part of Aarhus University Hospital in the same buildings as the Psychiatric Hospital in Risskov, but now it is located on Olof Palmes Alle in Aarhus N. The museum also offers social programmes directed at psychiatric patients, including an open atelier, and creative workshops.

The hospital opened in 1852 under the name “Jydske Asyl” (English: Jutish Asylum) in buildings designed by Michael Gottlieb Bindesbøll. The art museum is today located on Olof Palmes Alle in Northern Aarhus and holds a collection 12.000 works by psychiatric patients of which 850 are on display. Central to the exhibition is works by the painter and sculptor Louis Marcussen, also known as Ovartaci, who was a patient in the hospital for 56 years, from 1929 until his death in 1985, and after whom the museum is named.
