= Ferdinand Thielemann =

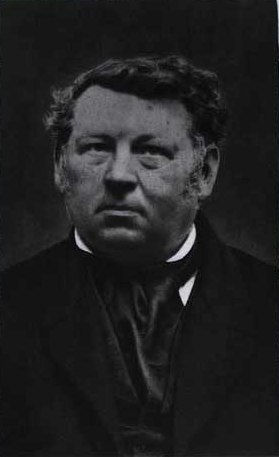
- Ferdinand Thielemann, c. 1863
- Born: 8 April 1803; Copenhagen, Denmark
- Died: 13 May 1863 (aged 60); Roskilde, Denmark
- Education: Royal Danish Academy of Fine Arts
- Occupation: Architect
- Awards: C. F. Hansen Medal (1833)
- Buildings: Aarhus city hall (former); Vilhelmsborg Manor
- Projects: Expansion of Jydske Asyl

Carl Georg Ferdinand Thielemann (8 March 1803 – 13 May 1863) was a Danish architect and royal building inspector during the 19th century. Thielemann was the brother of sculptors Christian and Theobald Thielemann and was born in Copenhagen. He studied architecture in 1819–20 at the Royal Danish Academy of Fine Arts under the tutelage of Christian Frederik Hansen. Thielemann was mainly taught the Neoclassical style but during the 1880s Historicism flourished and he adapted to the new style. After graduation Thielemann worked for Christian Frederik Hansen and Gustav Friedrich Hetsch as a conductor for their projects.

In 1851 Thielemann replaced Michael Gottlieb Bindesbøll as royal building inspector of Jutland and Fuenen. His tenure was notable for his careful treatment of old buildings. Thielemann frequently re-used the original materials during restoration projects and preferred to rebuild in the original style. His best known remaining works are the main building of Vilhelmsborg Manor (1843) and the old Aarhus city hall (1857–58). Thielemann also drew up plans for an expansion of Jydske Asyl which was initially rejected as being too expensive but during the 1856-57 expansion the designs were incorporated into the project by the architect Ferdinand Meldahl on behest of Carl Emil Fenger.

== Selected works ==
- Main building of Vilhelmsborg Manor, 1843
- Renovation of the Latin School in Viborg, 1843
- Main building of Eskildstrup Manor at Fuglebjerg, 1849
- Ribe Katedralskole, Ribe
- Renovation of Ribe Custom House, 1854
- Hospital buildings in Vejle and Horsens
- Aarhus city hall, 1857
- Courthouse in Odder, 1856
- Several rectories in Skallerup (1853), Vrejlev Kloster (1854) and Ødum Sogn (1854)
