= Old City Hall (Aarhus) =

Coordinates: 56.1571°N 10.2113°E

Aarhus Old City Hall.
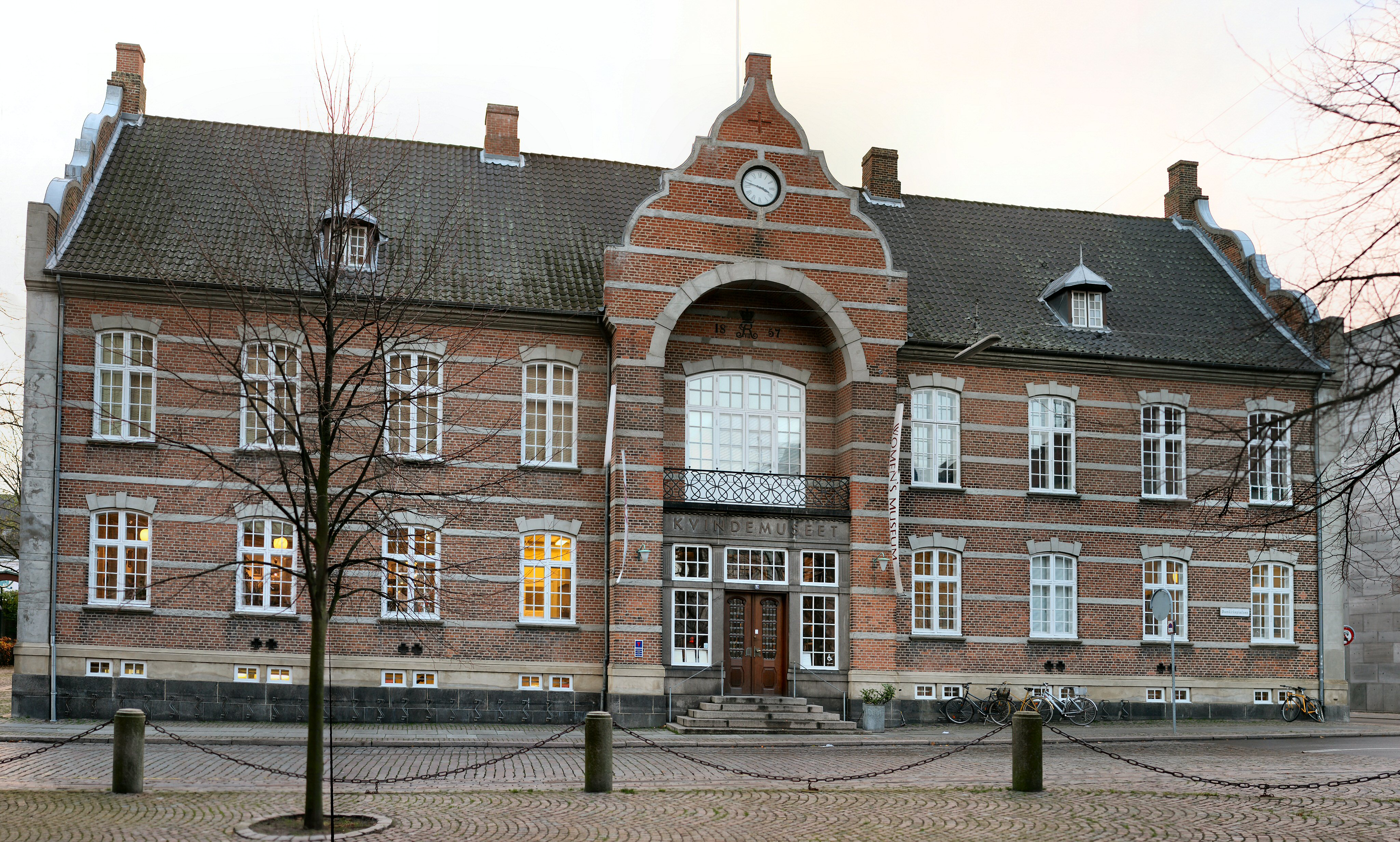
- Interactive map of the Aarhus Old City Hall. area

General information
- Architectural style: Neo-Renaissance
- Location: Aarhus, Denmark
- Completed: 1857

Technical details
- Floor count: 3

Aarhus Old City Hall is the former city hall of Aarhus, Denmark, and a listed building. The city hall was built in 1857 and was listed in the Danish national registry of protected buildings and places by the Danish Heritage Agency on 18 March 1996. It is the second, and oldest preserved, city hall of Aarhus.

The city Hall is situated next to Aarhus Cathedral on the corner of Domkirkepladsen and Mejlgade in the central Indre By neighbourhood and has functioned as city hall, police station and today as a museum, housing both the Gender Museum and the Occupation Museum.

== History ==
The city hall was built between 1856 and 1857 to a design by architect and royal building inspector C.G.F. Thielemann as a replacement for the former city hall which has been located opposite the cathedral. The building was designed to be a combined city hall, police station and jail. The main entrance led to the city hall and an entrance on the west side gave access to the police station while the jail was placed in a smaller building in a court yard behind the city hall. The mayor's office and council hall was placed on the first floor.

In 1906, a new jail and council building was built and the jail building behind the city hall was substantially changed to make room for offices. The interior of the city hall was renovated and the main entrance was enhanced with a large arch. The rapid growth of the city in the early 20th century meant the administrative needs quickly outgrew the city hall and offices spread to other nearby buildings. In the 1930s it was again decided to build a new city hall which became the current city hall on Park Allé, complete in 1941. When the city administration finally moved, the old city hall became the city's police from 1941 to 1984, when a new police station was built.

In 1949 the third-floor attic was taken into use as a storage space and small exhibition hall for a collection of Etruscan rarities collected by a professor from the University of Aarhus. In 1971 this collection was moved and became the Museum of Ancient Art. Since 1995 the building has housed the Women's Museum and the Occupation Museum. During the renovation in the 1990s a garden was established by the entrance, named for the women's rights activist Mathilde Fibiger.

== Architecture ==
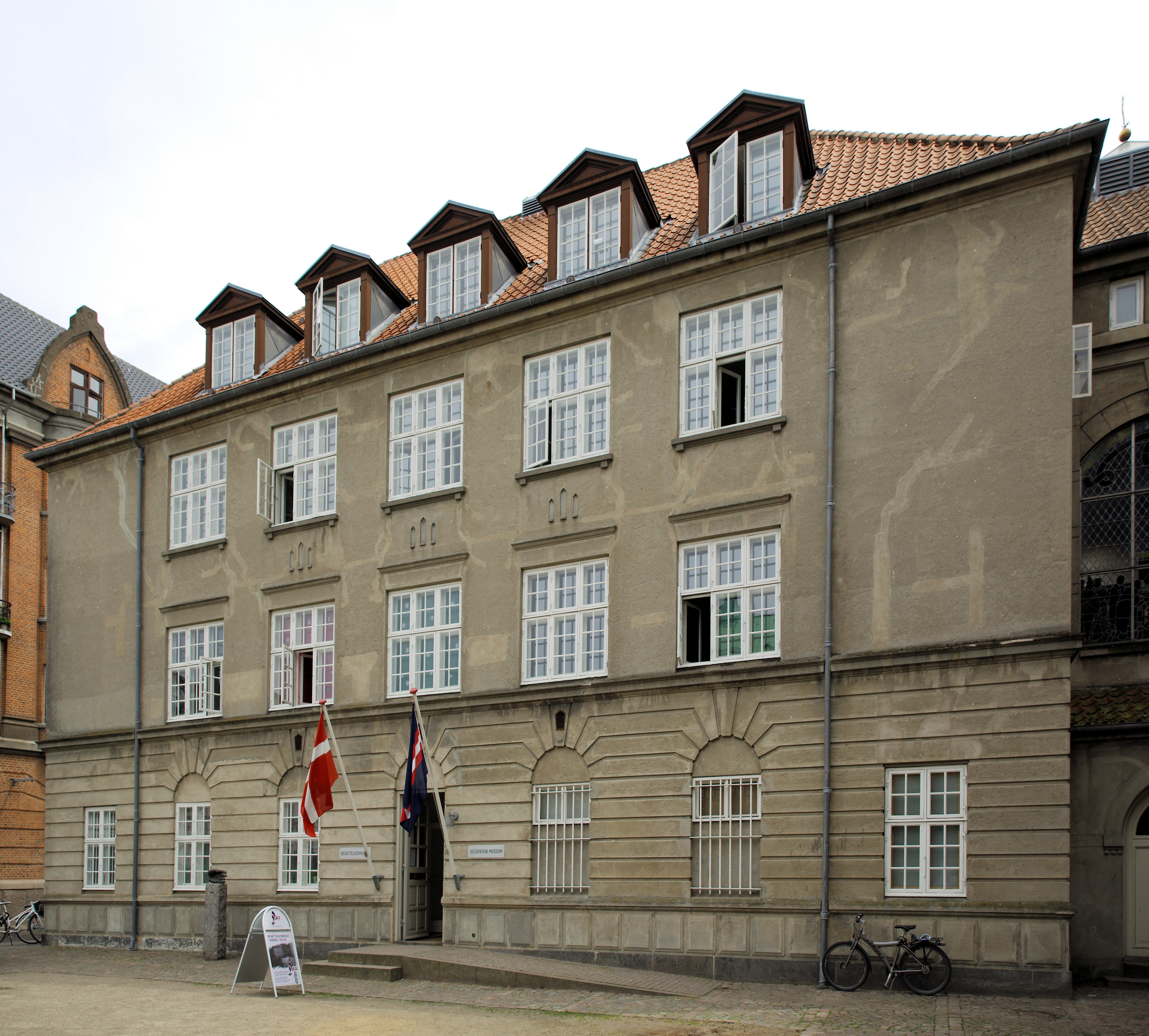
The rear of the building

The building is an example of Renaissance Revival architecture and was designed by C.G.F. Thieleman. Inspired by the psychiatric hospital Jydske Asyl in Risskov by Michael Gottlieb Bindesbøll, it reflects Thieleman's interest in Empire style and Neoclassical architecture. The interior was redesigned by S.F. Kühnel in 1907 and features prominent national romantic elements in the foyer and council chambers.

The building is built of red brick with horizontal bands of cement and granite ashlar in the corners. The main entrance is set under a large archway and the windows are decorated with pilasters. The structure rests on a base of granite ashlar with decorative bands above the basement windows. The ridged roof is covered in winged brick tile, broken only by two small dormer windows. The foyer features large granite columns under a painted strip waffle slab ceiling. The solid granite staircase is surmounted by two large glass ceiling mosaics.

== See also ==
- Aarhus City Hall
- Listed buildings in Aarhus Municipality
