= Aarhus Municipal Hospital =

- Central Denmark Region

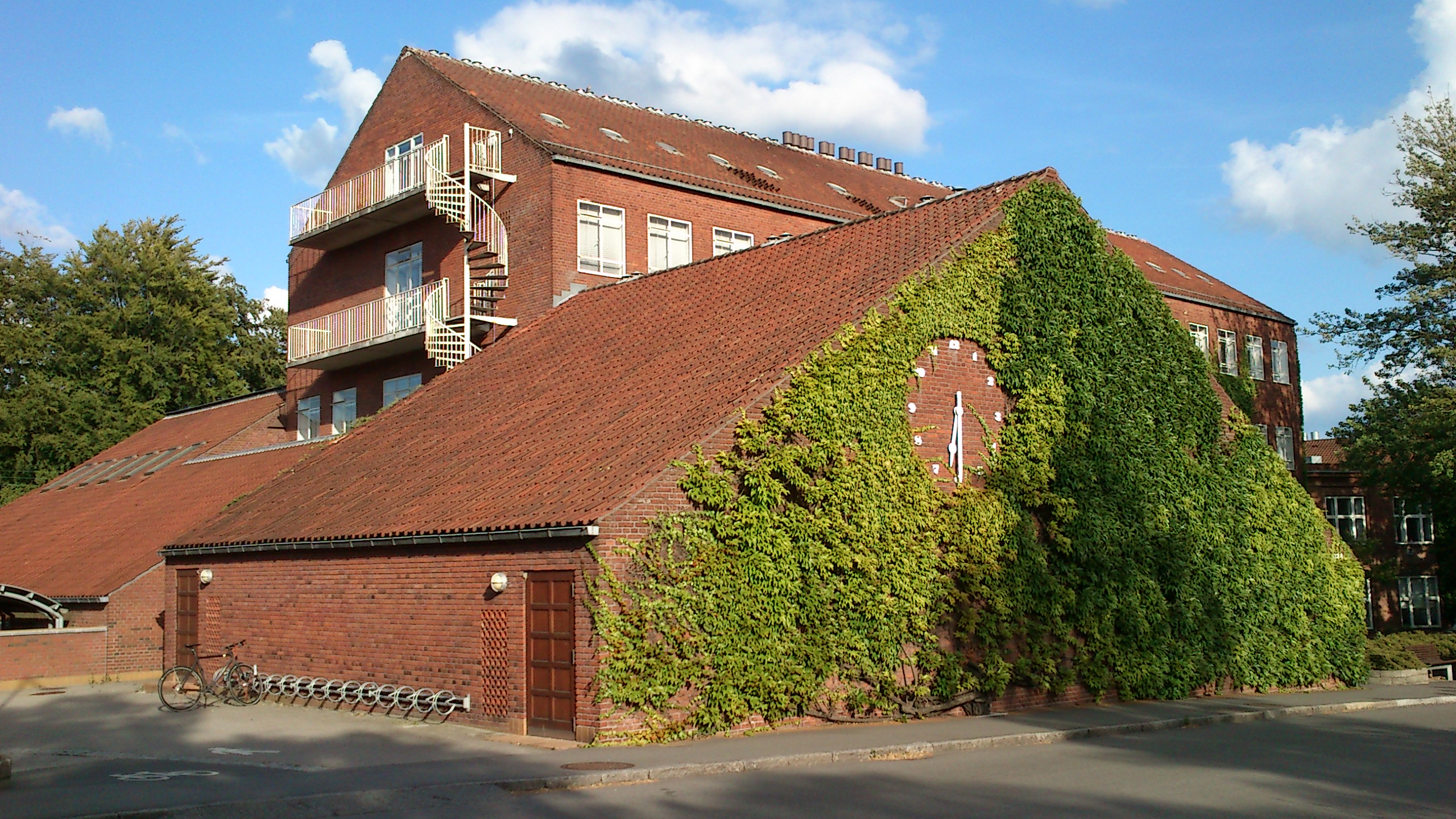
- Exterior clock on the Municipal Hospital

Geography
- Location: Aarhus, Central Region, Denmark
- Coordinates: 56°10′13.5″N 10°12′22.6″E

Organisation
- Affiliated university: Aarhus University
- Network: Aarhus University Hospital

Services
- Emergency department: Yes

History
- Founded: 1893
- Closed: 2018

Links
- Website: www.auh.dk

Aarhus Municipal Hospital, or Aarhus Sygehus, Nørrebrogade, was a hospital in Aarhus, serving 125 years from 1893 to 2018. The hospital was a department of Aarhus University Hospital and had sections for oncology, orthopedic surgery, medicine and neuro surgery. It also had an emergency department and was one of four trauma centers in Denmark.

In 2018 and early 2019, the hospitals functions were relocated to the new headquarters of Aarhus University Hospital in the northern borough of Skejby. The hospital buildings are situated on Nørrebrogade in the district of Midtbyen and they are scheduled for redevelopment as of 2019. The new borough will become part of the central University Campus at Aarhus University, and is now referred to as Universitetsbyen (The University Town).

== History ==
Aarhus Municipal Hospital was established on 7 November 1893 as an independent hospital in buildings designed by the architect Thomas Arboe. The hospital had 140 beds, one attending physician and two residents. In 1913, the department of epidemiology moved to Marselisborg Hospital and the medicinal department moved into the former epidemiological building while the surgical unit stayed in the main building. In 1918, the department of medicine moved to a new building and a department of tuberculosis was established. In 1931, C.F. Møller and Kay Fisker won an architectural contest for the design of an expansion of the hospital. The first new buildings were completed in 1935 in a functionalist style. The hospital has been expanded several times since then, including in 1980 and in 2008. On 1 January 2004, Aarhus Municipal Hospital merged administratively with Aarhus County Hospital, Marselisborg Hospital and Samsø Sygehus under the name Aarhus Sygehus. On April 1, 2007, Aarhus Sygehus merged with Skejby Sygehus to form Aarhus University Hospital.

Aarhus University Hospital built a new large single hospital in Skejby, in the northern parts of town, from 2012 to 2018, and all former hospital departments are to be merged and relocated here. In February 2019, the last hospital departments at Aarhus Municipal Hospital were relocated to The New University Hospital (DNU).

In 2016, Aarhus University bought the hospital grounds and buildings of the Municipal Hospital, and the area is scheduled for redevelopment as an extension of the central University Campus. The area will be known as "Universitetsbyen" (The University Town) in the future.

== Buildings ==
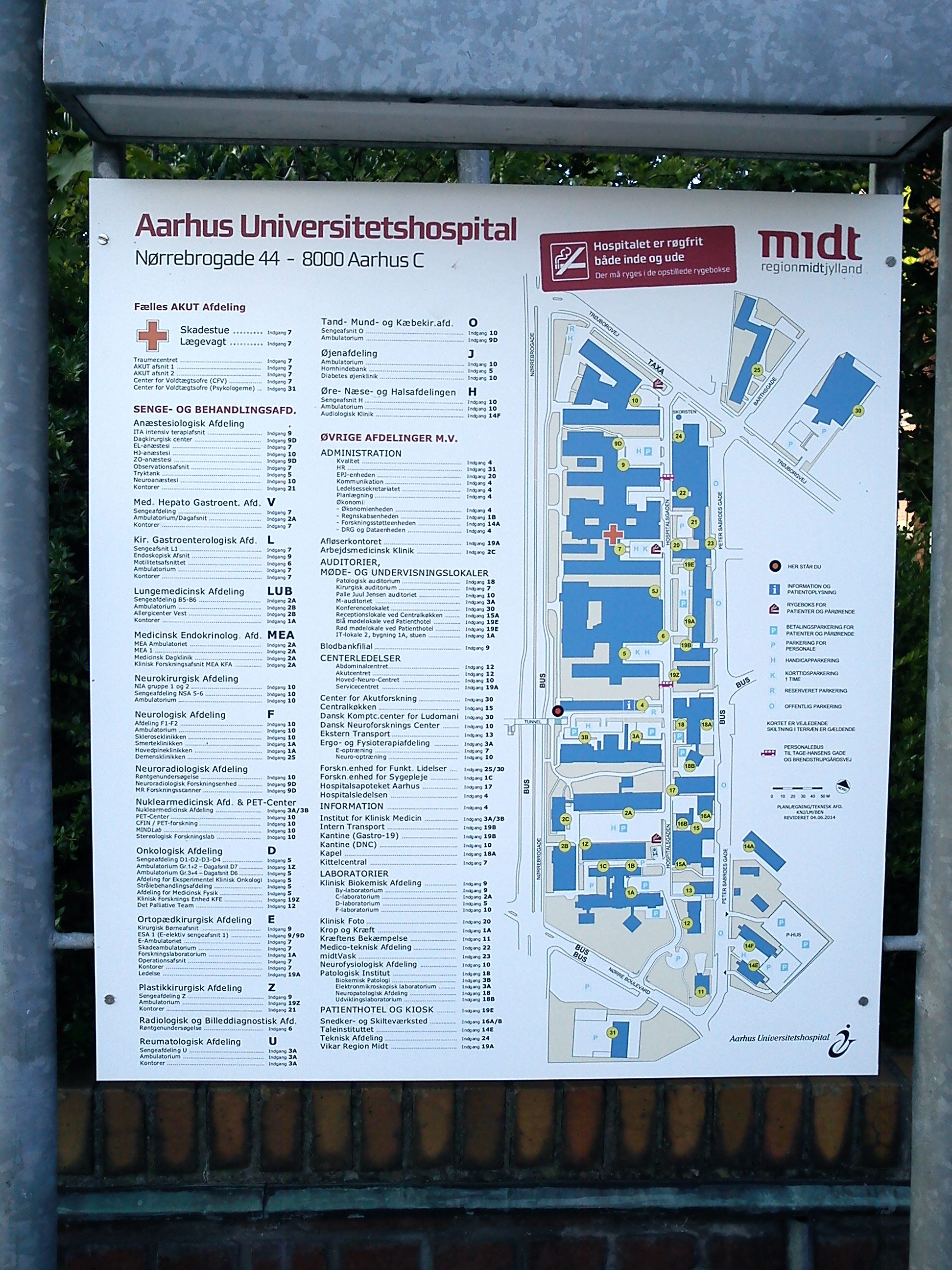
Plan and departments

The original buildings were designed by Thomas Arboe but Aarhus Municipal Hospital today is primarily characterized by the large expansion in the 1930s designed by C.F. Møller and Kay Fisker. C.F. Møller also designed the neighboring Aarhus University and the two projects has many architectural similarities, as both are designed in the Nordic functionalist style characterised by harmonious, cubist buildings with little decoration or ornamentation. Whereas the university buildings are free-lying across an undulating landscape, the hospital buildings are more traditional; H- or T-shaped buildings along a north–south main road. Various hospital departments have been placed west of the main road, and housing for employees to the east.

The hospital buildings are constructed in red brick with a ridged roof of red roof tiles. Windows were originally located towards the south in rooms with 3 or 6 beds to maximize the sunlight. Windows, doors and balconies were originally made of white-painted iron frames. The building for the surgical and radiological department was completed in 1935 after which Kay Fisher was no longer part of the project and C. F. Møller continued the project, following largely the same architectural expression. The minimalist, durable building design has been retained in later expansions and renovations.
