= Læssøesgades School =

Public primary school in Aarhus, Denmark

Læssøesgade School
- Læssøesgade Skole
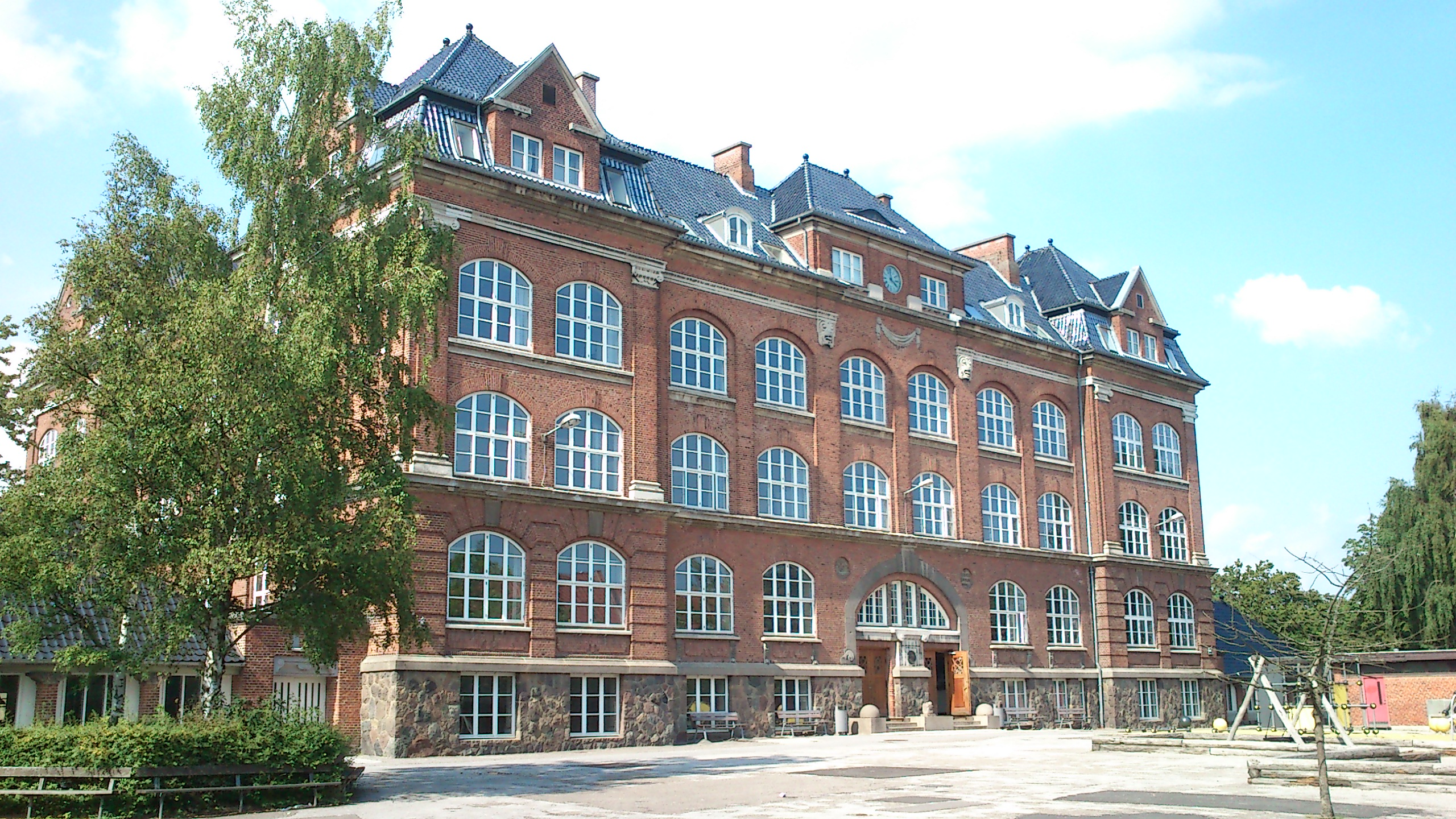

Location
- Læssøesgade 24, 8000 Aarhus C
- Coordinates: 56.1464°N 10.1871°E

Information
- School type: Elementary Public
- Established: April 16, 1921; 104 years ago
- School number: (+45) 86 12 33 87
- Principal: Jens Sønderbæk (2016)
- Grades: Reception - Year 10
- Gender: Co-ed
- Age: 4 to 16
- Enrolment: 350
- Language: Danish
- Website: Website

Læssøesgade School (Danish: Læssøesgade Skole) is a public primary school in the Frederiksbjerg district of Aarhus, Denmark. The school offers reception classes, 1 through 10 grades and after-school activities in the Skolefritidsordning (Sfo).

== History ==
In 1916 it was decided to build a new co-ed school in southern Aarhus in response to rapid population growth. The site chosen was what at the time was the edge of the city. The architect Ludvig Petersen had previously and recently worked on the Samsøgade School from 1914 and was chosen for the new project. The school was finished in 1921 and inaugurated on 16 April. The new school proved an expensive project at 1.5 million Danish Kroner compared to the 400.000 the Samsøgades school had cost. Lassøgade School was larger but the causes of the cost difference can mainly be found in the First World War and the ensuing inflation. The school initially had 31 class rooms and between the years 1930 and 1960 it had an average of 1000 to 1300 students. The student body has since grown steadily smaller and by 1999 it was down to 350 students across 31 class rooms. Co-ed classes were not introduced until 1946. In 1961 Læsseøgade School became the first school in Aarhus to offer the optional and voluntary 10th grade.

From November 1942 during the occupation of Denmark in the Second World War the school buildings were used to house German troops. Students were moved to Ingerslevs Boulevards School where they were taught under difficult conditions. In spring of 1945 Ingerslevs Boulevards School also had to be closed and school activities were suspended. However, in June the occupation was over and Læssøgde School had been cleaned, renovated and restored.

In 1920 Aarhus City Council gave permission to move a zoological collection, hosted by the Freemasons in a building in Christiansgade, to Læssøgade School. Between 1923 and the fall of 1939 the school hosted the collection on the top floor of the building. The collection was finally moved when a new museum building had been completed on the university campus where it remains to this day as the Natural History Museum.

== Architecture ==
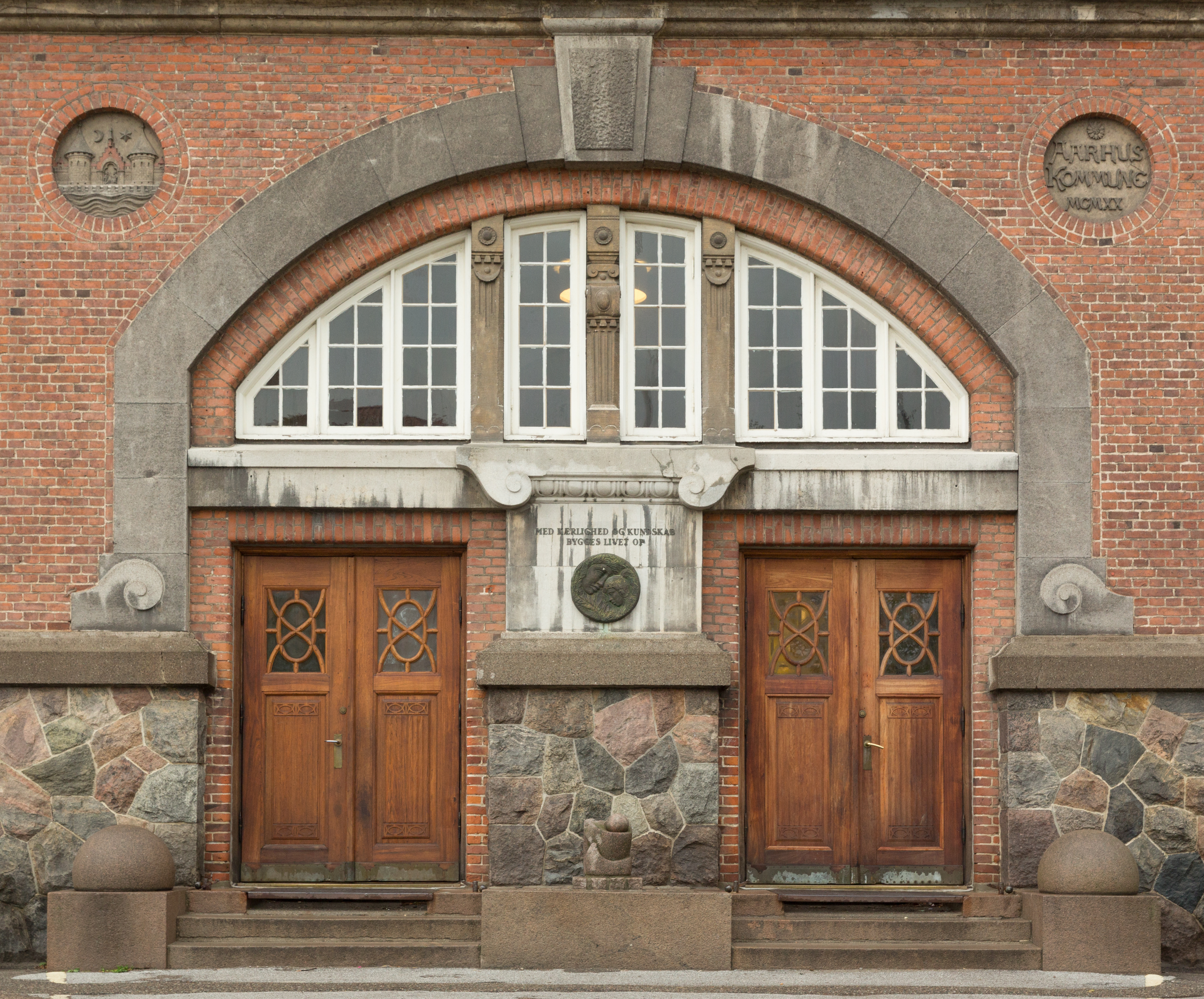
Entry gate

Læssøgade School is a three-story building constructed of red brick on a base of granite in the National romantic style with elements of Baroque revival. The corners of the building are accentuated as avant-corps with shadow joints and lesenes. The school was constructed as a 4-winged structure around an atrium similar to the Samsøgade School, completed a few years earlier. However, in Læssøgade School the atrium roof is at the same level as the roofs of the rest of the buildings and not at the 1st floor like in Samsøgade School. This difference creates an imposing spacious atrium which at the time was an unusual feature. In 1969 the school was expanded with toilet buildings in the school yard and an additional, smaller building to the north.
