= Natural History Museum, Aarhus =

Coordinates: 56°10′2.4″N 10°12′12″E

Natural History Museum
- Naturhistorisk Museum
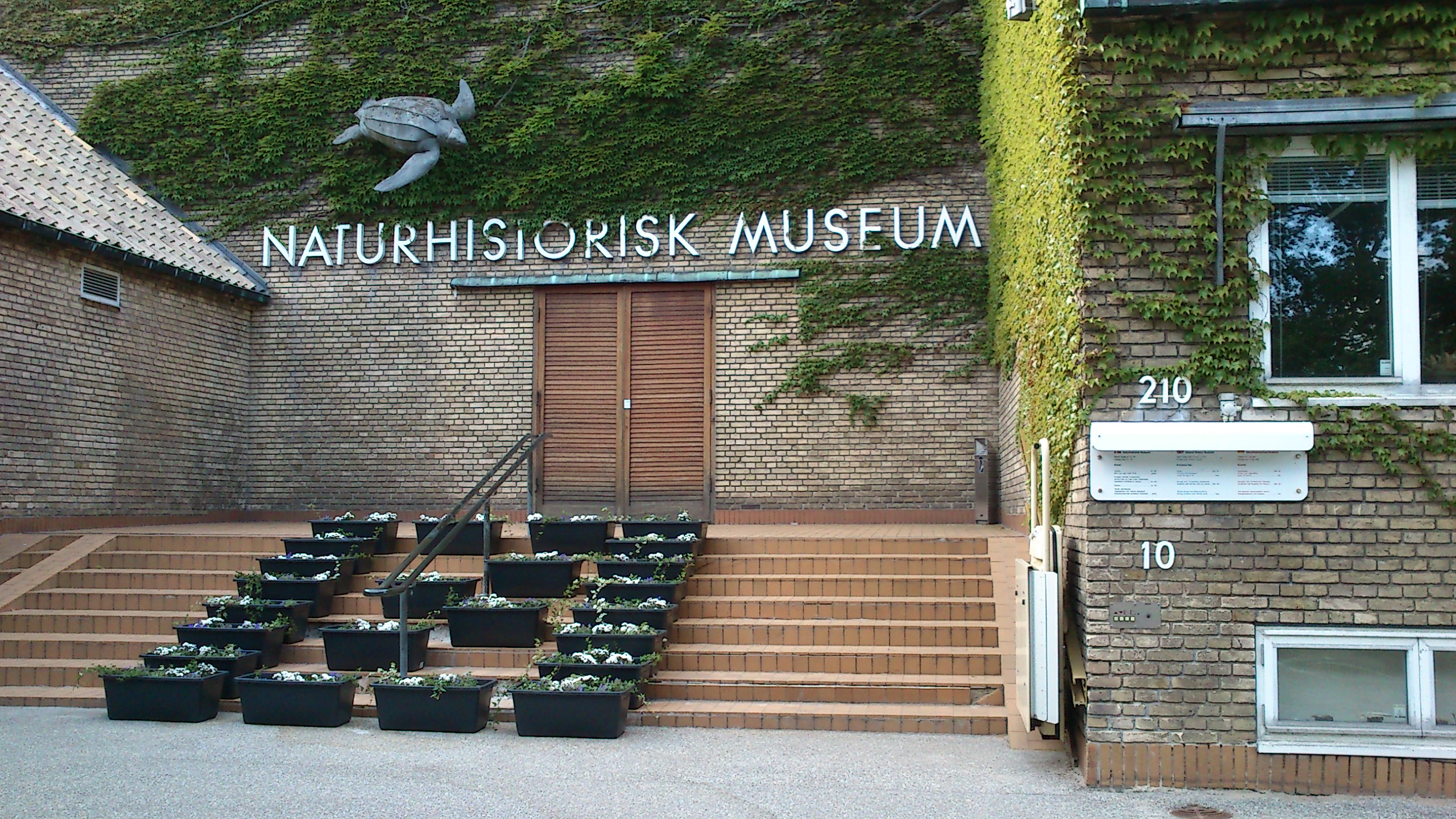
- Natural History Museum
- Established: 1921
- Location: Wilhelm Meyers Allé 210, Århus; Denmark
- Type: Natural history museum
- Website: Natural History Museum

The Natural History Museum (Danish: Naturhistorisk Museum) in Aarhus is a Danish museum specializing in natural history.

The Natural History Museum is an independent institution financed with contributions from the Ministry of Culture, Aarhus Municipality, Aarhus University and revenues from visitors. The museum is situated in the Aarhus University campus in the district Midtbyen, but also operates a field laboratory and education centre, the Molslaboratoriet, in Mols Bjerge National Park on Djursland. The Natural History Museum is controlled by a board of directors composed of representatives from Aarhus University, Aarhus Municipality, the Natural History Society for Jutland, the local business community and the employees. The museum conducts research in a number of areas with focus on entomology, freshwater ecology, earth biology, fauna and bioacoustics.

== History ==
The first natural history museum in Aarhus was mentioned in 1838 when it was given 2 rooms in the Aarhus Cathedral School. The school collection was absorbed into the museum collection at this time. In 1850 the members of the organization behind the museum had all left the city and the collection was taken over by the cathedral school and possibly donated to the Natural History Society for Jutland at some later point.

In the early 20th century efforts were underway to establish a university in Aarhus. A group of local businessmen lobbying to get the university built had created a zoological collection based on donations from the Natural History Society for Jutland and funds donated by the president of the Aarhus Oil Mill, Frederik Lausen. In January 1919 the city council received a request from the group to find a place to store the collection. The collection was moved in Læssøesgades School and a board of directors was created with members from the organization and the municipality. The museum was from the beginning an independent institution. The first 7 years the city funded the museum through the budget item "Preparations for a university in Jutland" but in 1928 the museum got a funding item for itself and the state stepped in with further funding.

Since the museum was created in connection with a future university it seemed reasonable to also place the museum in the university buildings so students and faculty had easy access. In May 1941 the museum opened for the first time. The building was drawn by C.F. Møller like the rest of the university. The university did not initially have a faculty for the natural sciences so the museum was established with its own scientific department so interested scientists could have a laboratory to work in.

== Collections ==
The museum have extensive collections of mammals, birds, skeletons, animal tracks, springtails, mollusks and corral. The collections in the museum are the second-largest of its kind in Denmark both in regards to size of the collection and size of the exhibition area- The largest parts of the collections are stored with only a small segment in the exhibition. The collections are used in ongoing research which mainly takes place in Denmark. Parts of the collections are on display in four permanent exhibitions and changing special exhibitions.

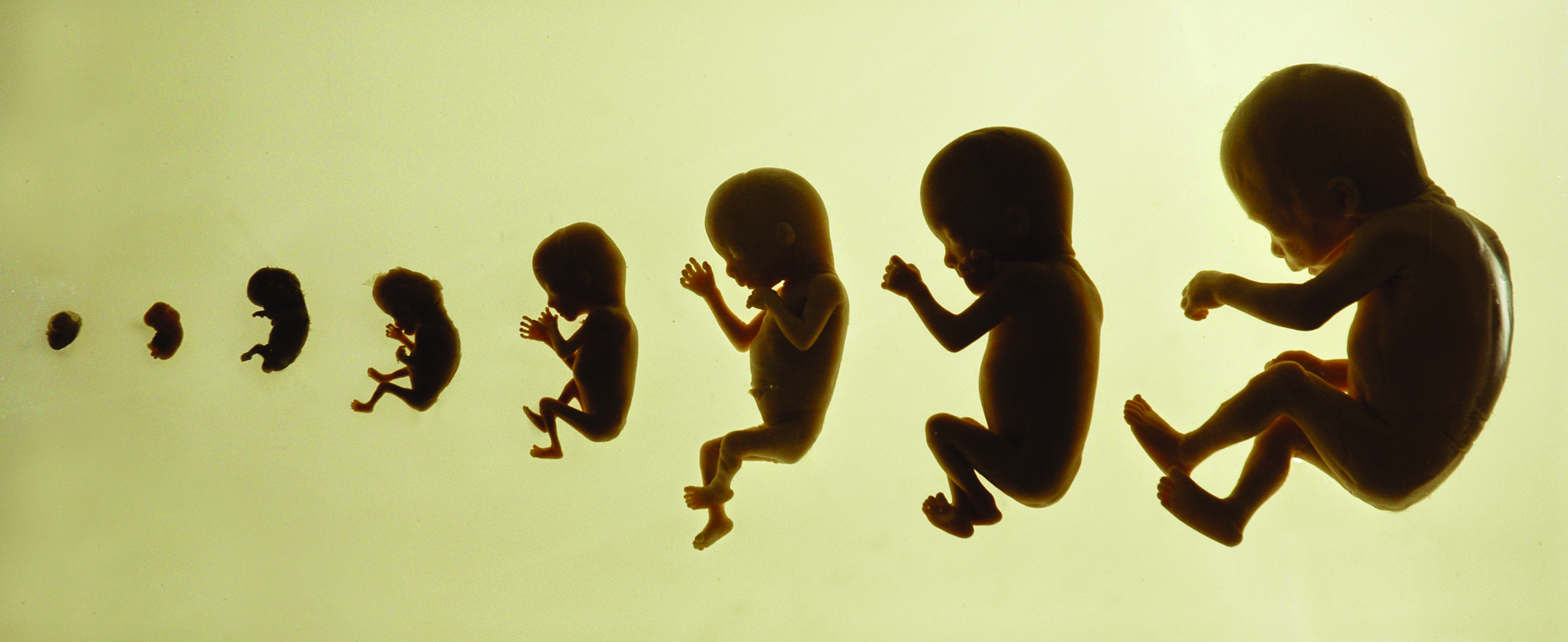

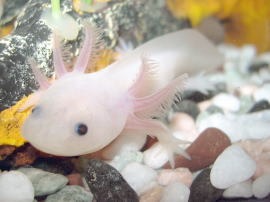

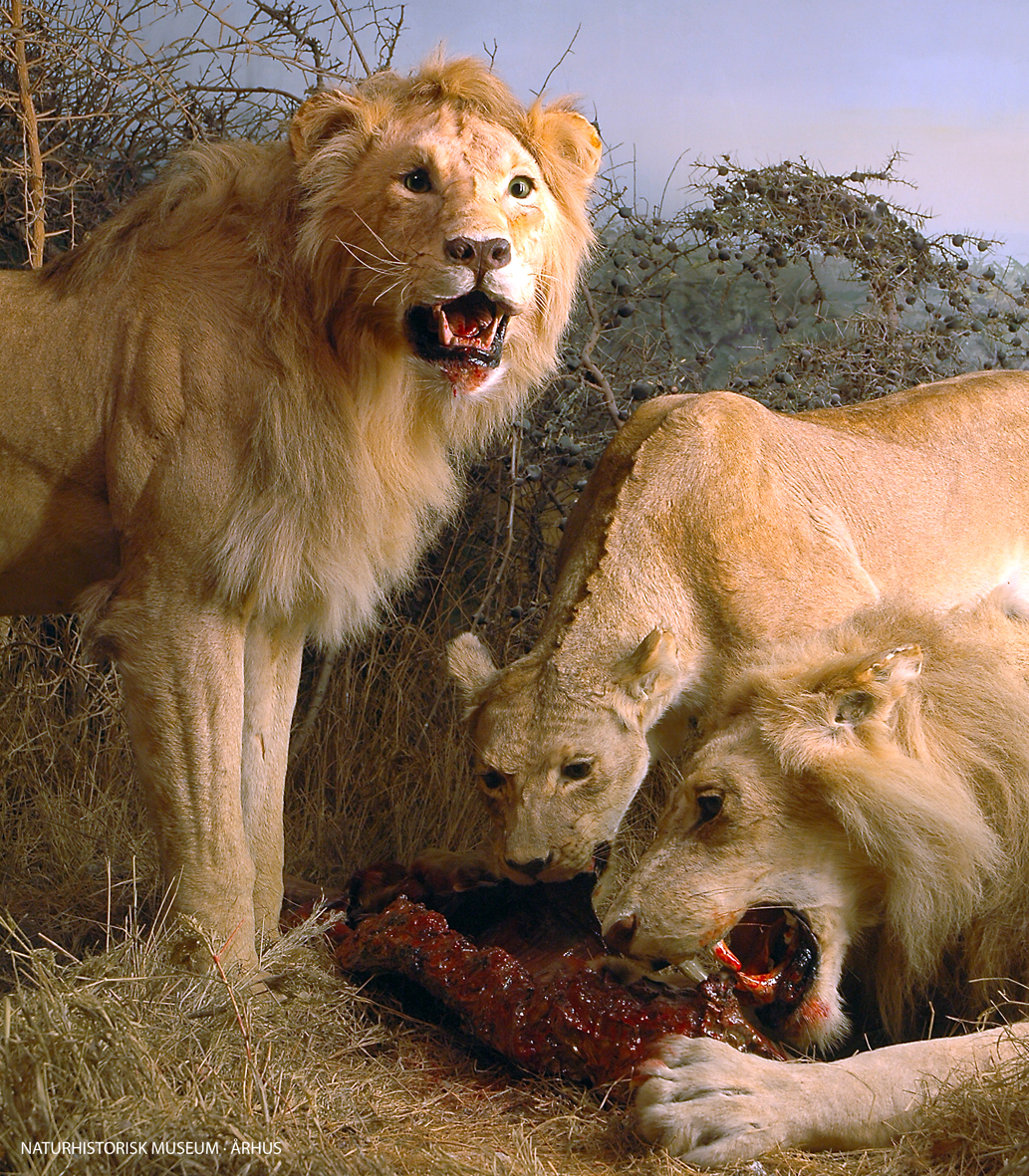

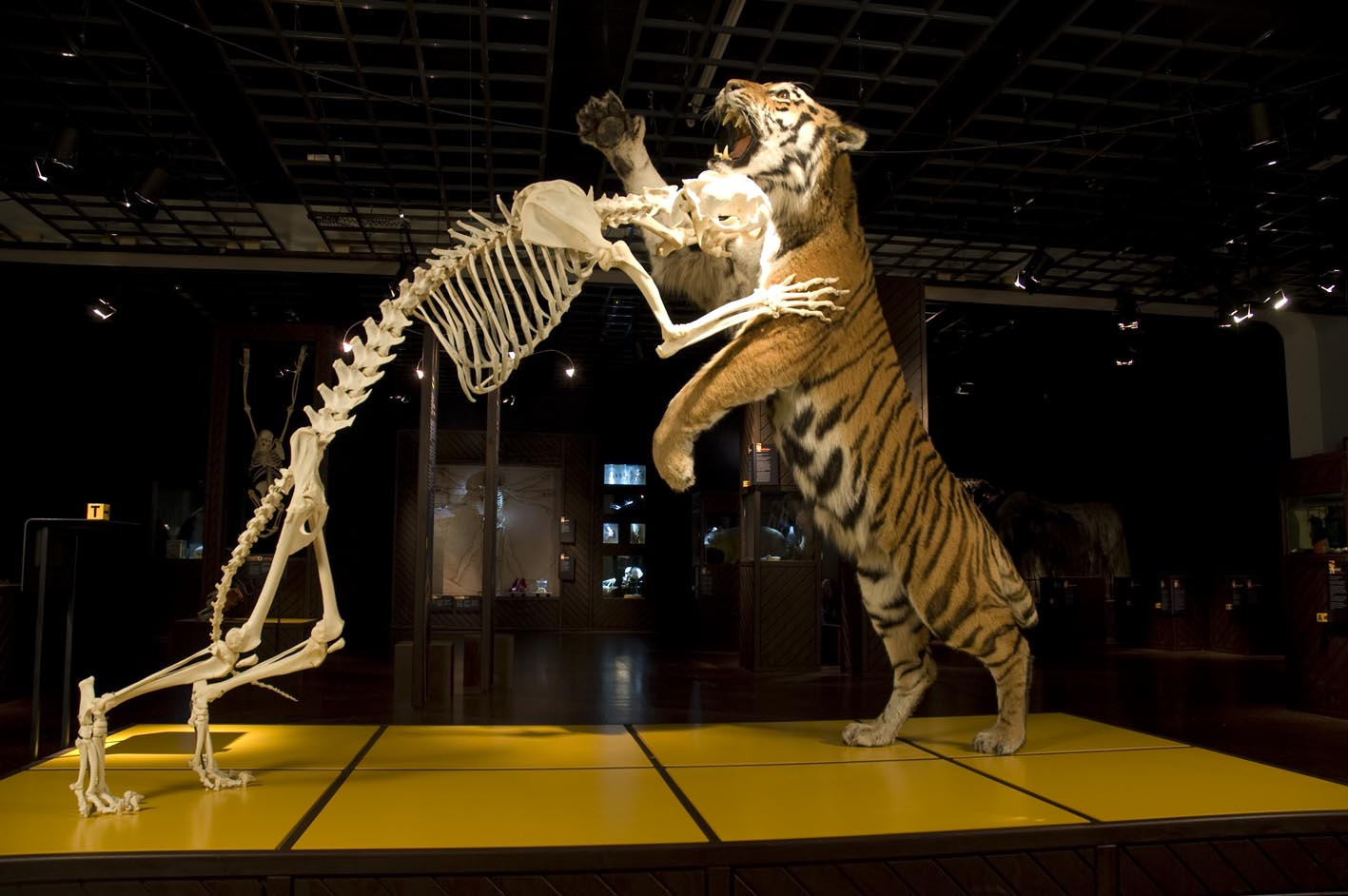

== Mission ==
The goals of the museum is specified in the Articles of Association which is reviewed and approved by the Ministry of Culture. In part, it states the goals of the museum to be to further research in the natural sciences and knowledge of scientific research. The museum conducts and supports research projects, maintains and expands its collections and the publicly available exhibitions, collaborates with other research institutions, the Institute of Biology of Aarhus University and different categories of elementary schools with the aim to contribute to education in the natural sciences.
