= Occupation Museum, Aarhus =

Occupation Museum
- Besættelsesmuseet
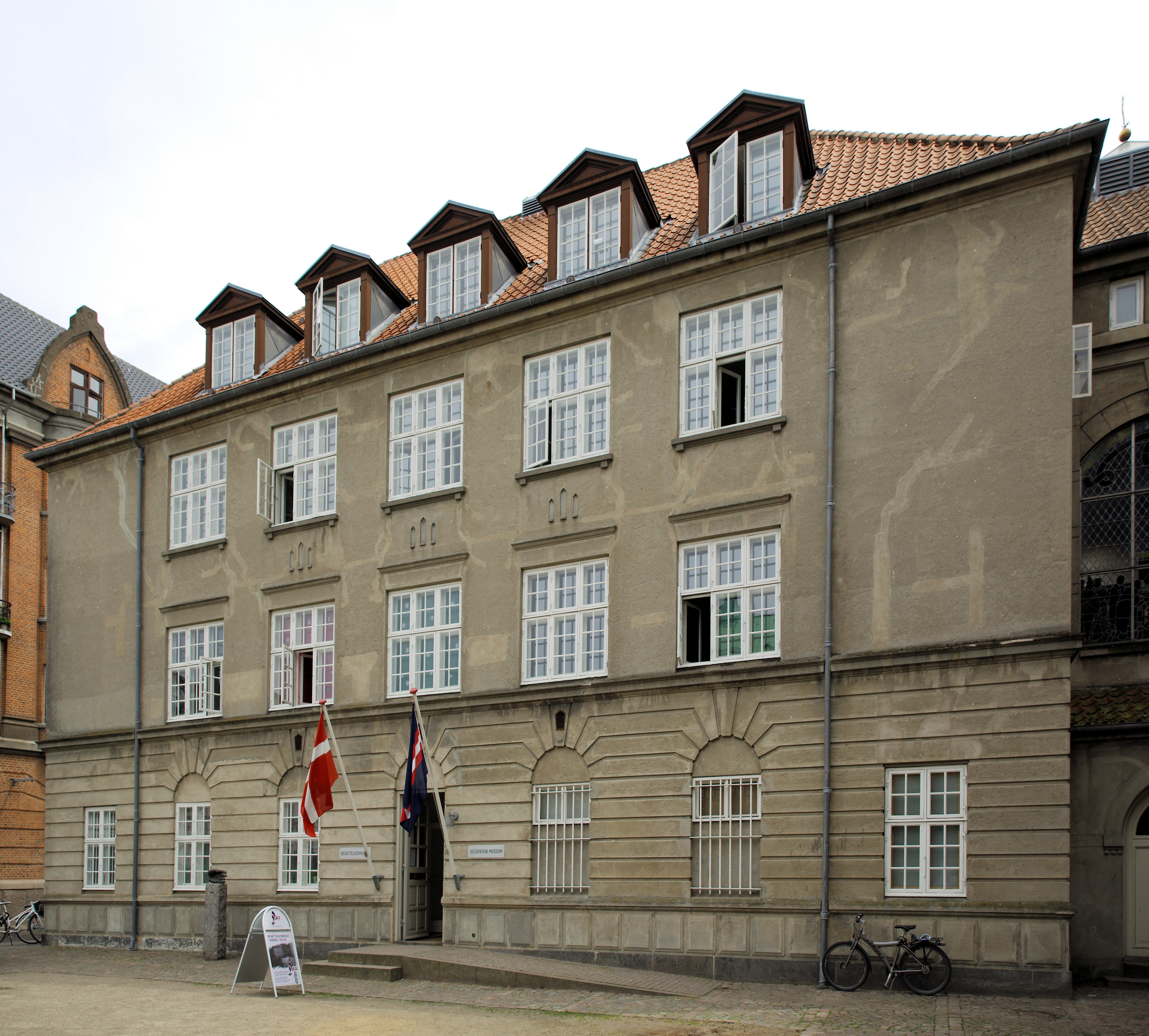
- The facade of the Occupation Museum
- Established: 1982
- Location: Mathilde Fibigers Have 2, Århus; Denmark
- Type: History museum
- Website: www.besaettelsesmuseet.dk

The Occupation Museum (Danish: Besættelsesmuseet) in Aarhus, Denmark is a history museum dedicated to the history of Aarhus during the German occupation in the Second World War.

The museum focuses on the major events of the war in Aarhus, especially the Aarhus Air Raid, the 1944 explosion in the Port of Aarhus, the activities of the prolific informant Grethe Bartram, and the resistance movement in general. The museum exhibition make use of the history of the building as a place of interrogation and torture to tell the story of the events of the war. The cells are furnished with original items and equipment, while the torture implements used at the time are on display. The exhibition features an extensive array of items from the 1940–45 period such as uniforms, weapons, mines, tools, passes and German, English and Danish propaganda.

== History ==
The museum was originally established in 1982 with the name Museet for Besættelsen i Aarhus, 1940–45 (English: The Museum about the Occupation in Aarhus), but was commonly referred to as the Occupation Museum. For the first year they borrowed premises in the Barracks on Langelandsgade, but moved to their current location in 1983.

The Occupation Museum is run by volunteers and the only revenue comes from ticket sales and donations from private individuals and organizations. In 2003 the museum went into a partnership with the museum Bymuseet and in 2008 the museum administrations were merged. In 2010 Bymuseet moved to The Old Town and had a total renewal in 2017, moving underground in a "time travel" journey through Aarhus history called "Aarhus Story". The Occupation Museum contributed with the exhibition "Occupied 1940–1945".

From 2018 till late August 2020, the museum was closed while going through a thorough renovation and renewal. The new museum focusses on the ethical dilemmas everyday citizens were faced with during the occupation, but presented in a way that engages the visitor.

== Building ==
The museum is situated in the historical centre, the Latin Quarter, in Midtbyen and shares the building of the Gender Museum. The building is a listed structure and it is the former city hall and police station of the city, constructed in 1856–57. In the later part of the war it served as the Gestapo headquarters for Jutland after the university buildings—where the Gestapo previously resided—were destroyed during an air raid by the Royal Air Force. The museum is a part of The Old Town in Aarhus, despite not (tilterally) physically being moved there, which is the case with all houses in The Old Town.
