= Ovartaci =

Danish artist (1894–1985)

- Born: Louis Marcussen; 26 September 1894; Ebeltoft, Denmark
- Died: 25 November 1985 (aged 91); Aarhus, Denmark
- Education: House painter
- Style: Phantasmagoric
- Website: ovartaci.dk

Louis Marcussen (26 September 1894 – 25 November 1985), known by the artistic name Ovartaci, was a Danish visual artist.

== Life ==
In 1923, Ovartaci emigrated to Argentina for six years for work, along the way rambling and experimenting with drugs. Ovartaci was committed to the Risskov psychiatric hospital in 1929, and adopted the name Ovartaci as a humorous spelling of the Jutlandic pronunciation of Overtosse ("chief loon"). He had a sex change operation (male to female) in 1957. He lived and worked in the institution for fifty-six years. In 1972 Ovartaci decided not to identify as a woman and started identifying as a man until his death in 1985.

Ovartaci's phantasmagoric work features numerous female and animal figures set within an abundance of symbols, interiors, and landscapes. These figures are invested with a sense of identification that seems to defy the divide between real life and the realm of art. In 2018 an expansive exhibition entitled "Ovartaci and the Art of Madness" included a survey of the artist's work, as well as homages and related works by contemporary artists. His art can be seen at Museum Ovartaci in Aarhus, Denmark, a museum named after him showcasing artwork created at the psychiatric hospital in Risskov, Denmark.

In 2022, a monograph on Ovartaci's life, work and production was released: Ovartaci: The Signature of Madness.

== See also ==
- Museum Ovartaci
