= Samsøgades School =

- Samsøgades Skole
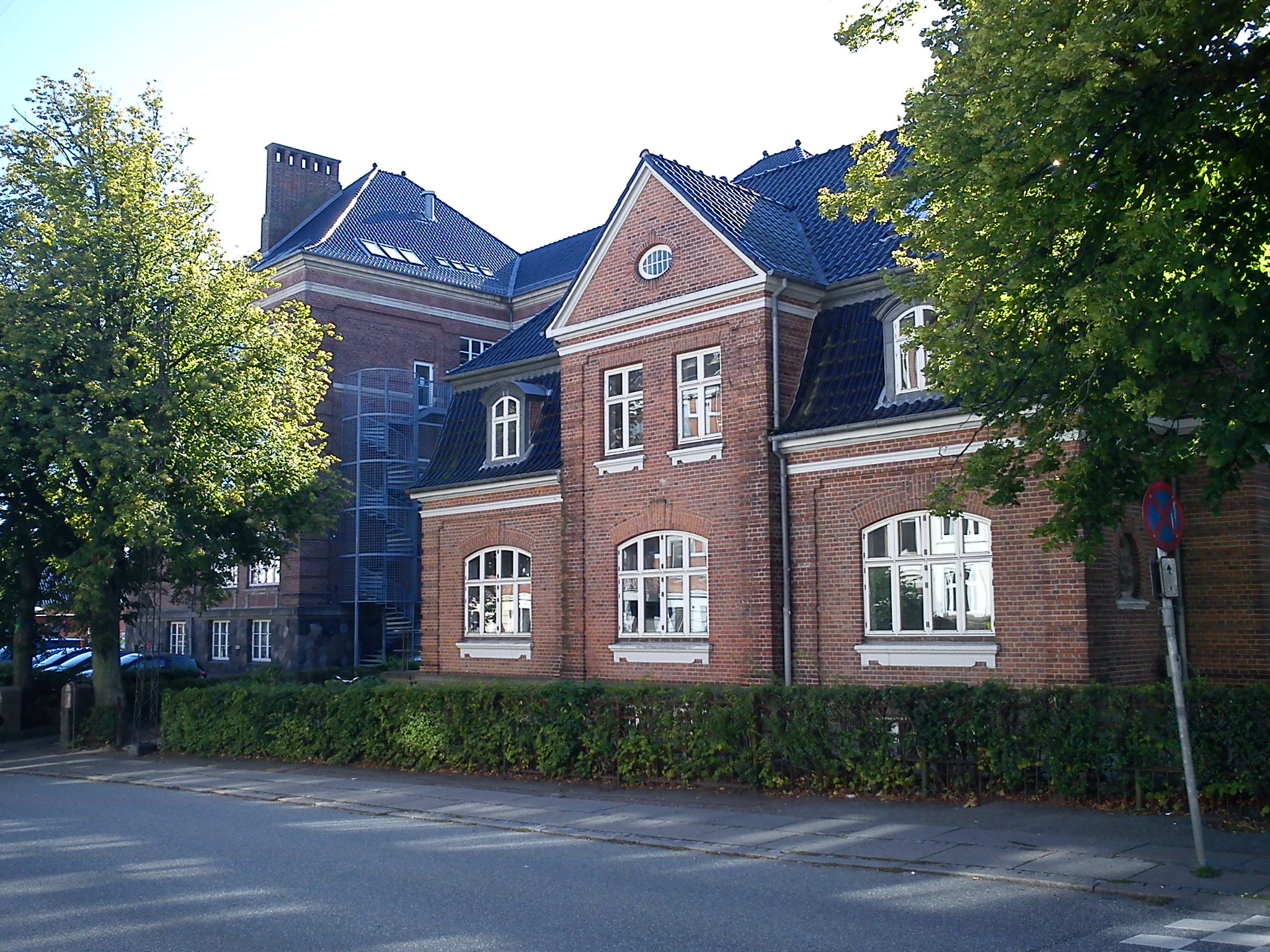

Location
- Ny Munkegade 17, 8000 Aarhus C
- Coordinates: 56.1622°N 10.2028°E

Information
- School type: Primary Public
- Established: 1914
- School number: (+45) 87 13 88 77
- Chair: Janus Boye (2015)
- Principal: Preben Stadsgaard (2017)
- Grades: Reception - Year 9
- Gender: Co-ed
- Age: 6 to 16
- Enrolment: 480
- Language: Danish
- Website: Website

Samsøgades School (Danish: Samsøgades Skole) is a public primary school in the Midtbyen district of Aarhus, Denmark. The school offers reception classes, 0 through 9 grades and after-school activities for some 500 students across 22 classes (2016).

== History ==
In 1909, the paid school system in Aarhus was abolished in favor of a public school system, effectively ending 100 years of polarization in the school system. Teaching was homogenized and standardized so ideally all students had equal opportunity. Combined with rapid population growth the number of students grew and it became necessary to build a number of new schools in the early 20th century. The architect Ludvig Petersen had already built the schools in Ingerslevs Boulevard, Finsensgade and Fjordsgade and he was commissioned for another school project to be situated where the former epidemiological hospital had been situated in the northern section of the city.

The school was a few months old when the First World War broke out and the ensuing economic crisis meant that initially not all facilities could be used in order to save cost. During the German occupation in World War II the school was confiscated and used as a barracks to house German soldiers. Teaching continued in the Skovvang School but it was closed in 1945 making regular school activities almost impossible.

The school initially operated with gender separation and co-ed classes didn't become the norm until 1946. In the 1960s, the number of students in the city started dropping as more people moved their families into the suburbs, resulting in a number of school in the city center closing down. Samsøgade School survived but the neighboring school in Ny Munkegade closed nd the students moved to Samsøgade School. From 1987 to 1988, the number of students rose from 383 to 559. The growth was projected to be lasting so in 1988 the school was expanded for 5.8 million Danish Kroner.

In 1998, Samsøgade School was one of 22 applicants among 793, and the only one in Aarhus, to be chosen for the information technology project IT Springet funded and supervised by the Danish Ministry of Education. The project included a grant for 740.000 DKR and started in the school year of 1999/2000. Aarhus Municipality supported the project with another grant of 800.000 DKR and named Samsøgade School an IT-model for all municipal public schools. As a model school Samsøgade School is responsible for advising and counselling other schools in IT solutions, both technical, learning related and organisational.

Former students include 2 former Danish prime ministers: Hans Hedtoft and H. C. Hansen

== Architecture ==
Samsøgades School is a monumental 4 story building in the Gothic revival style, constructed of red brick on a basement of granite ashlar. It is situated at the top of a hill which at the time of construction was on the outskirts of the city, overlooking it. It was the first school in Denmark built around a central atrium. The building has rich masonry decorations around the windows and at the corners. It was designed as a 4-winged building around a central atrium which is quite low with a roof on the 1st floor. The atrium roof is supported by brick columns and is called the "column hall" (Danish: søjlehallen). It was built by the architect Ludvig Petersen who designed a number of other buildings in and around Aarhus including N. J. Fjordgades School in 1910 and Læssøesgades School in 1921. Læssøesgades School can be said to be a refined interpretation of Samsøgades School with a large spacious atrium with a roof at the level of the surrounding school buildings.
