= Gender Museum Denmark =

Museum in Aarhus, Denmark

Coordinates: 56°9′25.8″N 10°12′41.2″E

KØN - Gender Museum Denmark
- KØN - Gender Museum Denmark
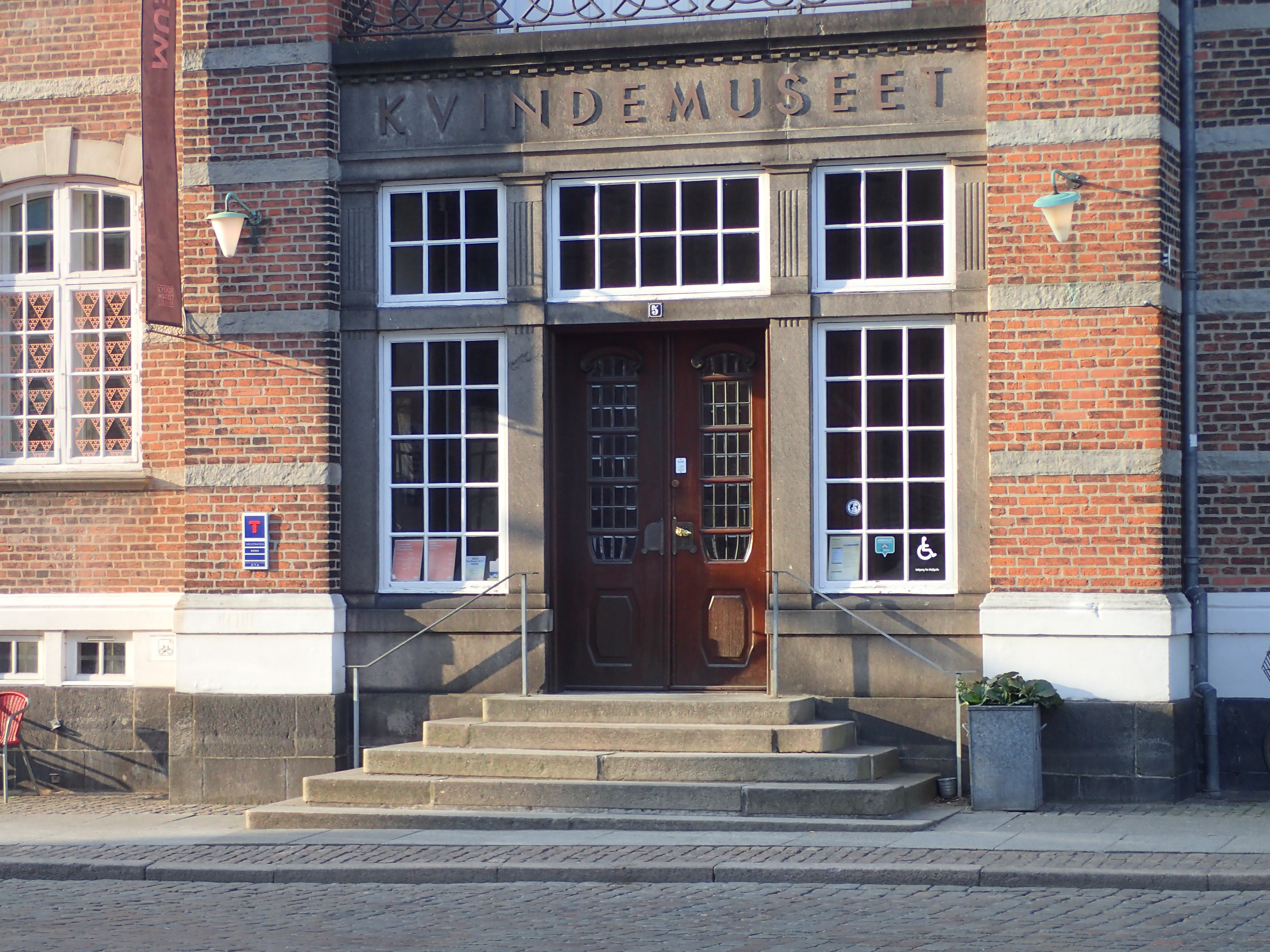
- KØN - Gender Museum Denmark
- Established: 1982
- Location: Aarhus, Denmark
- Website: konmuseum.dk/

KØN - Gender Museum Denmark, formerly Kvindemuseet (Women's Museum), is a history museum in Aarhus, Denmark focused on the cultural history of gender and sexuality in Denmark. KØN was originally founded on 31 October 1982 as a women's history museum, and since 1984 has been housed in the former Aarhus City Hall, built in 1857.

== Background ==
In 2016, the museum's thematic focus was expanded to encompass issues of gender and sexuality in the broadest sense, and as a result of that, the museum's name was changed to KØN (Gender in English) in February 2021. The museum is spread over 3.5 floors, with 1200m² of exhibition space. There is also a café and bakery at KØN. In the 1990s, the museum created the Mathilde Fibiger Garden, a public space alongside the museum for hosting outdoor events. The museum was also further expanded in 2005. Their permanent exhibitions highlight women's role in democracy, gender roles, sexual education, the #MeToo movement, the Red Stocking Movement, and also highlight the history of the building in which the museum is based.

As of 2012, the museum operated on a budget of DKK 10 million from state, municipal and private funding. In addition to its permanent and temporary exhibitions, KØN provides educational outreach programs. In 2014, the Aarhus municipality approved an annual grant of DKK 500,000 to KØN to teach sex education, gender equality and democracy to schoolchildren.
