= Aarhus County Hospital =

- Central Denmark Region

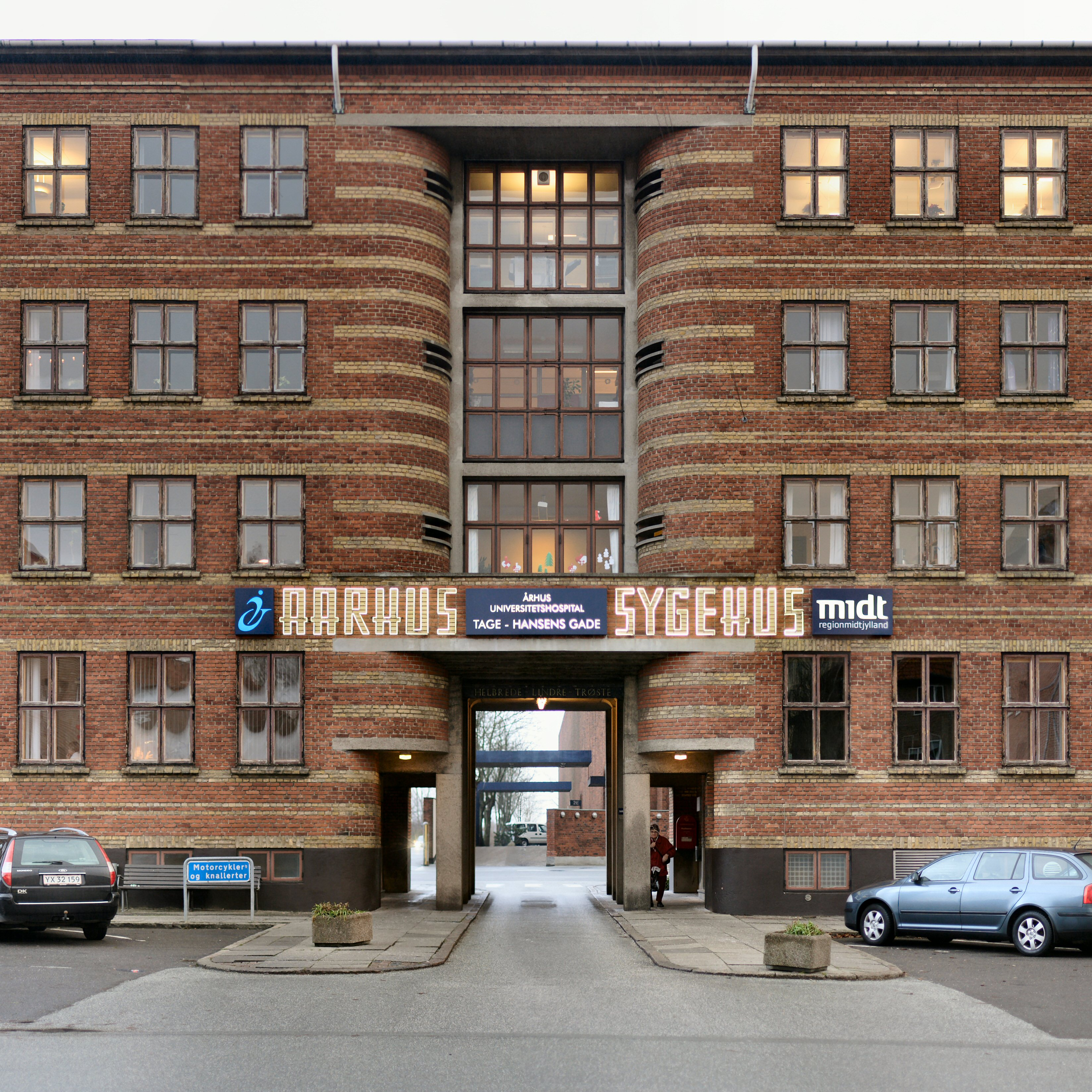
- Entrance to the County Hospital

Geography
- Location: Aarhus, Central Region, Denmark
- Coordinates: 56°09′30.5″N 10°11′11.4″E

Organisation
- Affiliated university: Aarhus University
- Network: Aarhus University Hospital

Services
- Emergency department: Yes
- Beds: 800

History
- Former name: Aarhus County Hospital
- Founded: 1882; reopened as University Hospital in 2018

Links
- Website: www.auh.dk

Aarhus County Hospital, or Aarhus Sygehus, Tage-Hansens Gade, was a hospital in Aarhus for 136 years, from 1882 to 2018. The hospital became a part of Aarhus University Hospital (AUH) in 2011 in an administrative merger. In 2018, all hospital functions at Aarhus County Hospital were relocated to AUH in Skejby in northern Aarhus.

The hospital buildings are situated on Tage-Hansens Gade in the neighbourhood of Vesterbro in the inner city of Aarhus. The area is scheduled for redevelopment into a new residential area from 2019.

== History ==
Aarhus County Hospital was established in 1882 on Kroghsgade which at the time was a part of Viby Municipality. The hospital was for the residents of Aarhus County while the inhabitants of Aarhus used an older hospital on Dynkarken. The initial hospital complex consisted of a main building and another building for epidemiology with 42 beds. The new hospital quickly experienced insufficient space in spite of a series of large expansions. In the 1920s the County council recognized more investments were needed to secure the future of the hospital. Scientific advances had made it possible to heal far more diseases and the population within the county had exploded. The council hired the architect Axel Høeg-Hansen to develop a plan for an expansion. Høeg-Hansen presented a plan for an expansion that would cost 2 million Danish Kroner and another plan for a new hospital on a different site that would cost 3 million. The council abandoned any plans to build a new hospital and instead started working on plans for a new hospital.

Aarhus Municipality turned out to be interested in the existing hospital complex and offered 500,000 Danish kroner for it along with a large parcel of land between Silkeborgvej and Viborgvej. The county accepted the offer partly because it was economically favorably and partly because the county hospital was increasingly collaborating with Aarhus University which lay close by. The agreement was signed in 1930. Axel Høeg-Hansen was hired to design the new hospital and he created a large cohesive hospital complex with 316 beds. The hospital section was placed in a 200-meter-long, four-story building oriented east to west. The building was divided in an east wing for medicinal treatment and a west wing for surgical treatment separated by a central hall. The patient rooms were divided in sections of 25 patients placed in three rooms with six beds, two rooms with two beds, and one room for single occupancy, a system that was maintained for decades to come. The hospital was inaugurated in 1935 after four million bricks had been laid and 4.1 million kroner had been spent.

The county Hospital has since been expanded a number of times, many between 1947 and 1982, in response to rapid growth. In 2004 the Aarhus County restructured the hospitals and closed a number of functions and small departments on smaller hospitals in Odder, Grenå and on Samsø. At the same time Aarhus Municipal Hospital and Aarhus County Hospital merged to form one organisational unit, Aarhus Sygehus. In 2011, Aarhus Sygehus and Skejby Sygehus merged to form Aarhus University Hospital. The county hospital complex was bought by Aarhus Municipality and will be redeveloped into a new residential neighborhood from 2019. The hospital functions was moved to a new hospital complex in Skejby in 2018.

== Buildings ==
The County Hospital was designed by the architect Axel Høeg-Hansen in a Neoclassical style with some elements of Functionalism. The central part of the hospital complex is a four-story patient building connected to a T-shaped treatment building. The patient building is angled and bent to form three divisions. Individual buildings have rounded corners at the entrances and flat roofs. There is an emphasis on the horizontal with bands of yellow brick in the red-brick walls. The entrance to the hospital is through a gate in an employee building to the west.

The hospital has an adjoining park which was established based on the treatment paradigm used at the time. Today most treatment is done on an outpatient basis but when the hospital was built most patients were admitted for a period of time. Providing patients with fresh air and space was considered an integral part of treatment, partly because many dwellings were smaller and not as well insulated or heated.

The hospital has been expanded a number of times, first by the architect Harald Salling-Mortensen in 1963 and Cubo Architects in 2002.

=== Departments ===
The university hospital has the following departments:

- 3D Innovation
- Admin Unit
- Anaesthesiology and Intensive Care
- Cardiology
- Center of Functionally Integrative Neuroscience (CFIN)
- Clinical Biochemistry
- Clinical Epidemiology
- Clinical Genetics
- Clinical Immunology
- Clinical Microbiology
- Clinical Neurophysiology
- Clinical Pharmacology
- Danish Centre for Particle Therapy
- Danish Neuroscience Centre (DNC)
- Danish Stroke Centre (DSC)
- Department of Cardiothoracic and Vascular Surgery
- Dermatology
- Emergency Department
- Endocrinology and Internal Medicine
- Functional Disorders
- Gambling Disorders
- Geriatrics
- Haematology
- Hepatology and Gastroenterology
- Histopathology
- Infectious Diseases
- Molecular Medicine (MOMA)
- Neurology
- Neurosurgery
- Nuclear Medicine and PET-Centre
- Obstetrics and Gynaecology
- Occupational Medicine
- Oncology
- Ophthalmology
- Oral and Maxillofacial Surgery
- Orthopaedic Surgery
- Otorhinolaryngology, Head and Neck Surgery
- Paediatrics and Adolescent Medicine
- Patient Hotel
- Physiotherapy and Occupational Therapy
- Plastic and Breast Surgery
- Radiology
- Renal Medicine
- Respiratory Diseases and Allergy
- Rheumatology
- Steno Diabetes Center Aarhus
- Surgery
- Urology

== Data and facts ==
2024 Annual Statistics
Statistic	Amount
Number of beds	800
Admissions	80,989
Average length of stay	3.1 days
Outpatient visits	973,493
Births	4,641
Full-time employees	9,488
Doctors	1,788
Nurses	3,606
Budget	DKK 7.93 billion (approx. $1.25 billion USD)
Size	528,000 metres squared

== International affairs ==
=== International affairs ===
The hospital aims to develop international research and innovation projects. It collaborates with industry, international hospitals, universities, and other key partners globally and they are critical to the hospital's development of technological solutions, new therapies, and improved diagnostics for patients. The hospital stresses the need for regulations that reflect the needs of healthcare transformation.

=== Strategic partnerships ===
The hospital is engaged in strategic partnerships with the European University Hospital Alliance, ICON (a partnership with Fraunhofer Institute for Software and Systems Engineering), and the Health Outcomes Observatory.

== Rankings and awards ==
The hospital was ranked 12th on Newsweek's rankings of the World’s Best Smart Hospitals for 2025. It was also the second best smart hospital in Europe.

The hospital was ranked 18th on Newsweek's rankings of the World's Best Hospitals for 2025.

The hospital was awarded the Building Better Healthcare Award: C F Møller Architects for International Design in 2017.
