= Ludvig Petersen =

Danish architect (1848–1935)

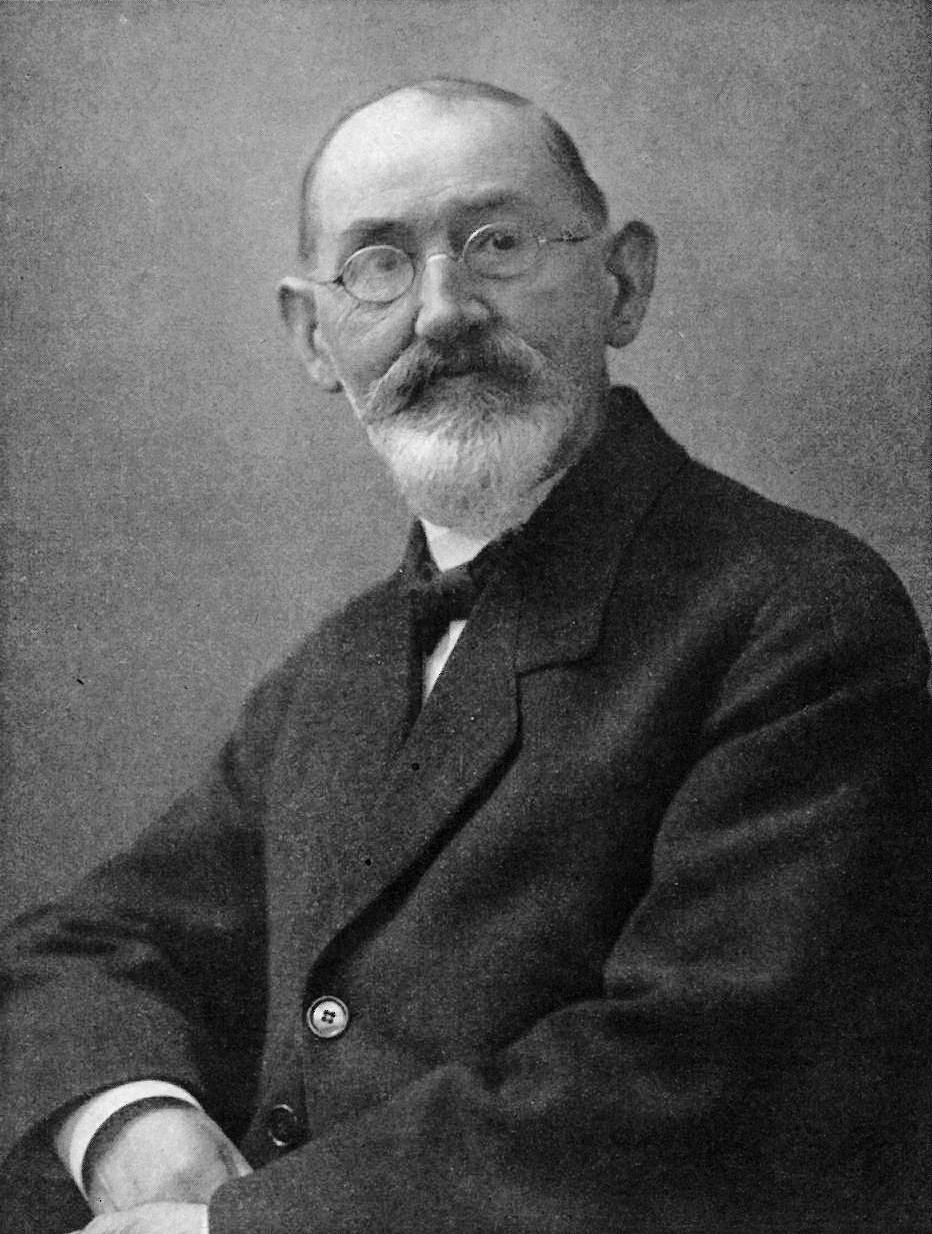
- Born: 31 May 1848; Copenhagen, Denmark
- Died: 10 April 1935 (aged 86); Hillerød, Denmark
- Education: Royal Danish Academy of Fine Arts
- Occupation: Architect
- Buildings: Læssøesgades School; Samsøgade School; N.J. Fjordsgades School

Signature
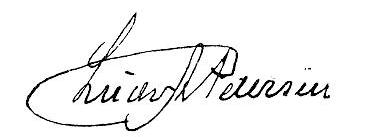

Ludvig Adolph Petersen (31 May 1848 – 10 April 1935) was a Danish architect, teacher, and a founding member and board member of the Danish Association of Architects. Petersen primarily worked as an architect in Vejle and Aarhus.

== Career ==
Petersen was originally trained as a carpenter between 1865 and 1868. He attended the Royal Danish Academy of Fine Arts in Copenhagen, where he graduated with a degree in architecture. Between 1872 and 1880, he was a teacher at the technical school in Copenhagen. He later moved to Vejle, where he worked both as a teacher and principal in the Vejle Technical School between 1880 and 1888. From 1888 to 1918, Petersen lived and worked in Aarhus as a teacher at the city's technical school.

From 1877 to 1880, he worked as the conductor at the renovation of Aarhus Cathedral under Vilhelm Theodor Walther. In 1880, Petersen opened his own architects' practice.

Among Petersen's best known works are a number of schools in Aarhus; Technical School on Ingerslevs Plads and the elementary schools in Finsensgade, N.J. Fjords Gade, Paradisgade, Ny Munkegade and Læssøesgade. His works architecturally shift between different Historicist styles. The tower on St. Nicolai Church and Missionshuset in Vejle have a Neo-Gothic appearance with red brick and pointy-arched windows. The tower has stepped buttresses in the corners and a wide cornice-frieze while Missionshuset has frieze and windows framed by yellow brick. The Neo-Gothic style is a common element in many of Ludvig Petersen's school buildings while Vejle Theater is an example of Baroque Revival architecture.

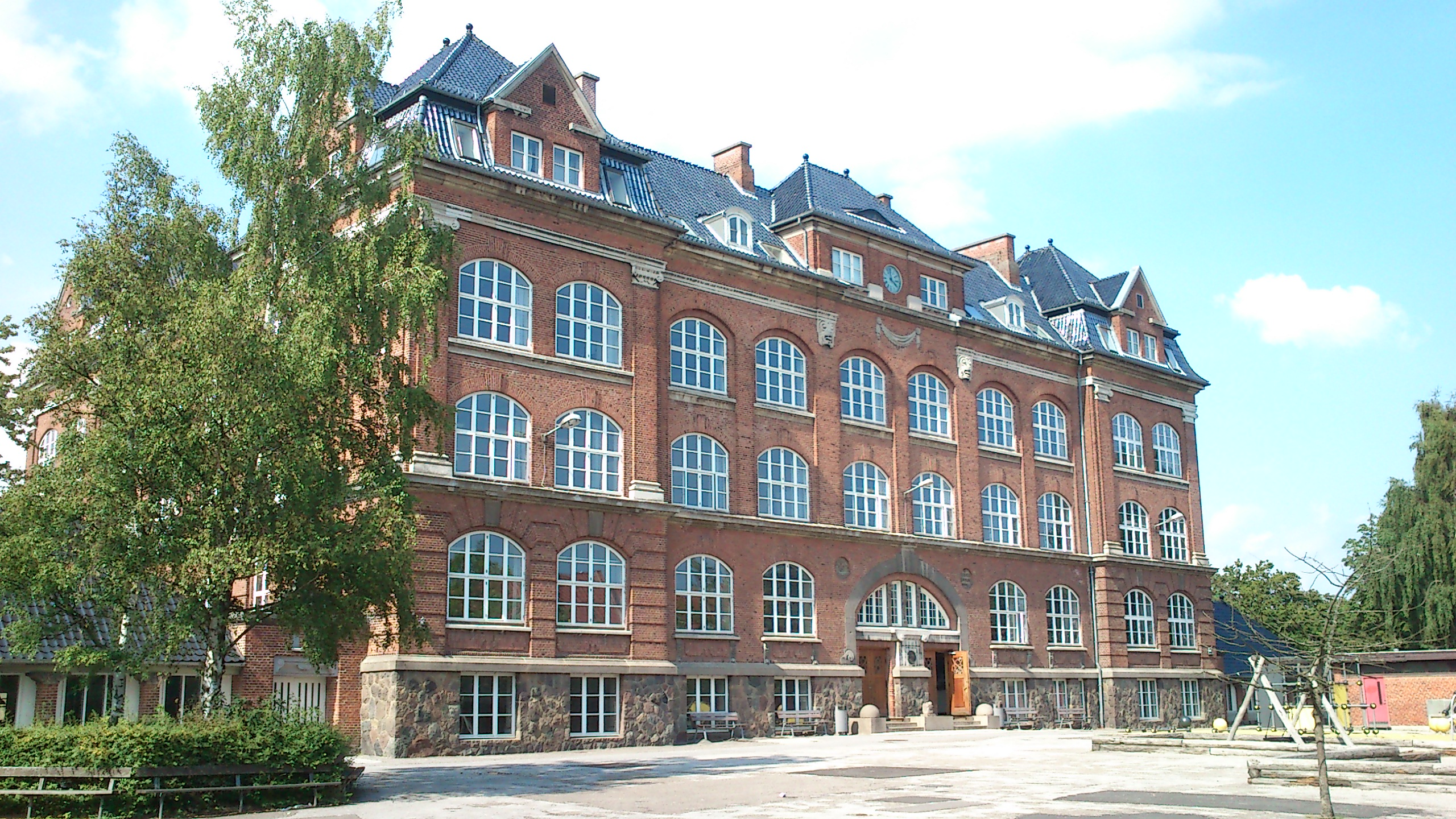
Læssøesgades School

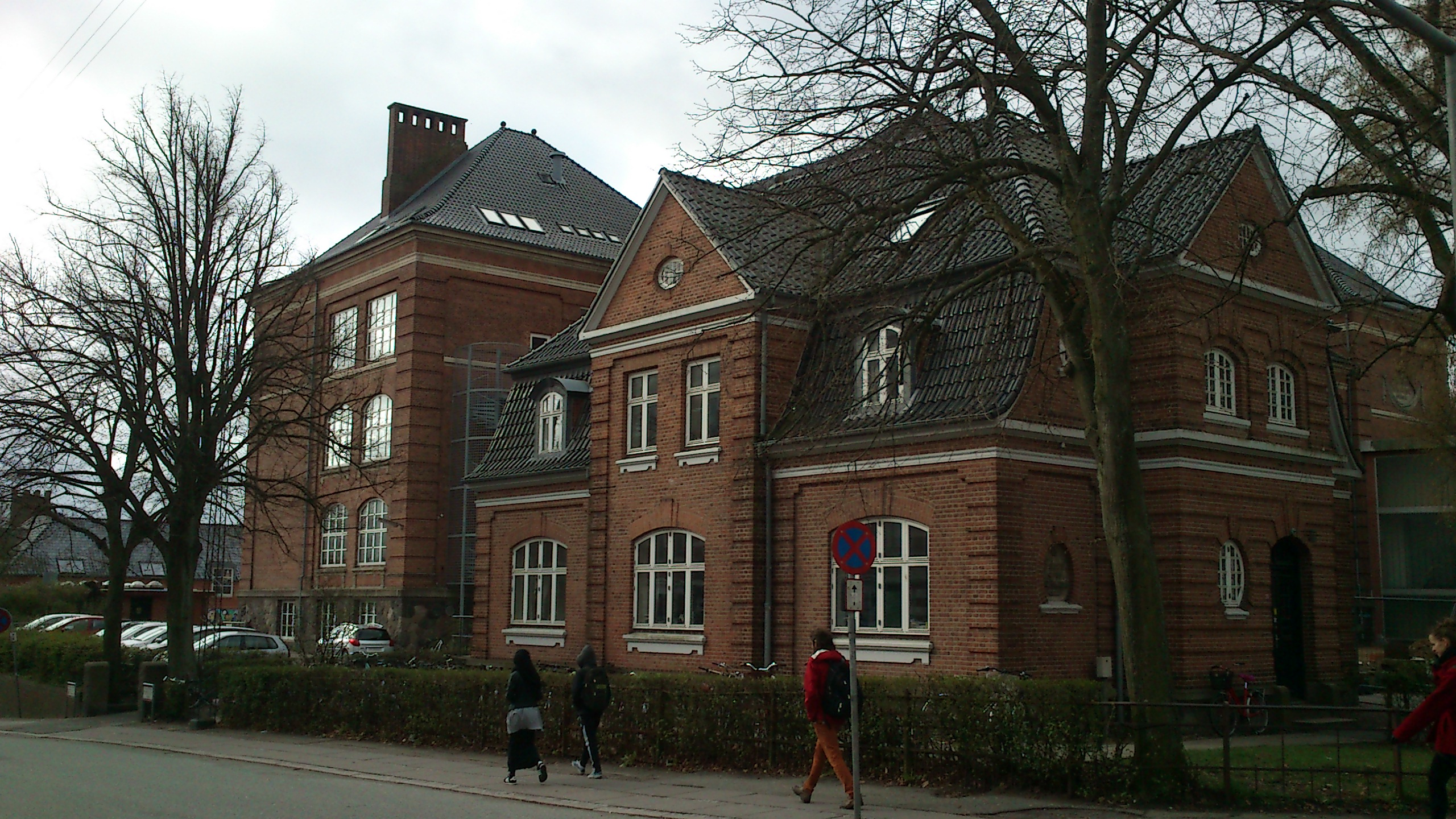
Samsøgades School

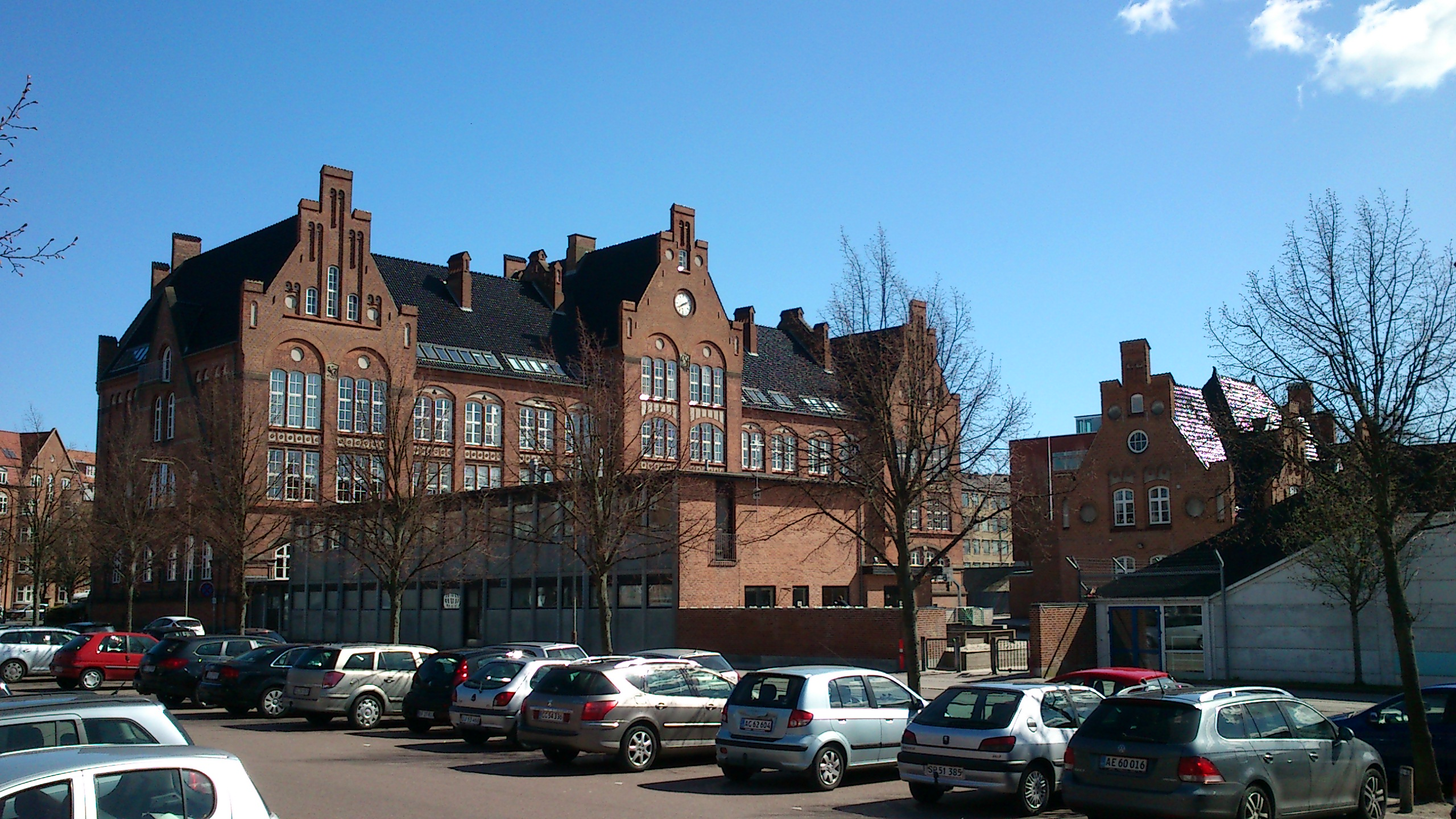
N.J. Fjordsgades School

== Personal life ==
Ludvig's parents were Zacharias Petersen, a ship's builder at Holmen in Copenhagen and teacher at the Royal Danish Academy of Fine Arts, and Emilie Sophie Thortsen. His brother was Edvard Petersen, a painter and teacher at the Academy of Fine Arts.

He married Agnes Theodora Walther, the daughter of Vilhelm Theodor Walther, in 1881. Their son is the botanist and sketch artist Vagn Petersson.

Petersen died on 10 April 1935 and is buried at Holmens Cemetery in Copenhagen.

== External references ==
- Ludvig Adolph Petersen on Wikimedia Commons
