= Aarhus University Hospital =

- Central Denmark Region
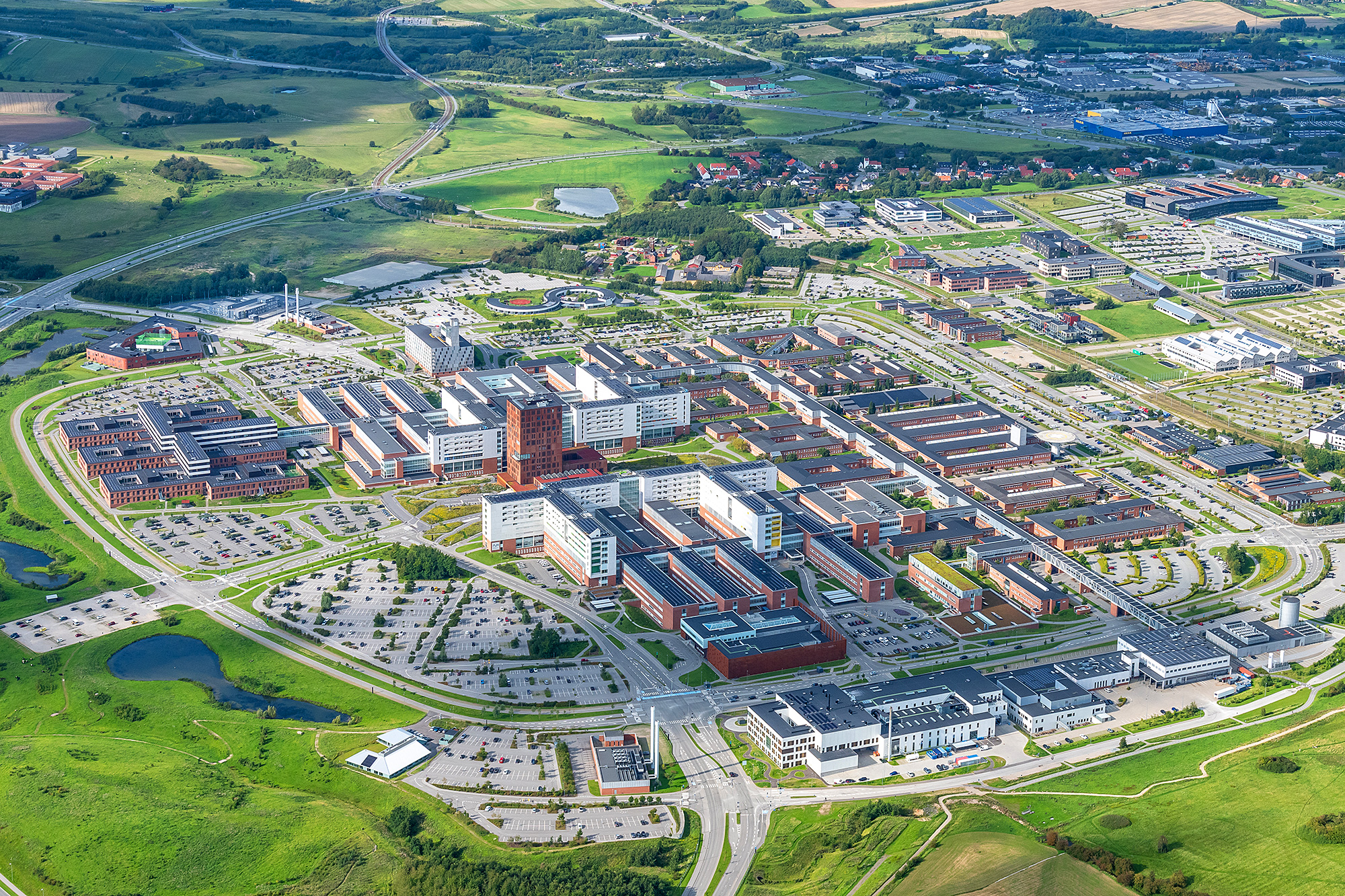
- The New University Hospital (DNU)

Geography
- Location: Aarhus, Denmark
- Coordinates: 56.191998°N 10.172236°E

Services
- Emergency department: yes
- Beds: 1,150

Helipads
- Helipad: 2

History
- Founded: 1 April 2011

Links
- Website: www.auh.dk

Aarhus University Hospital (AUH) is a university hospital located in Aarhus, Denmark. The hospital develops and provides highly specialised medical treatment, research and education at an international level. The university hospital's headquarters and main department, known as The New University Hospital (DNU), is the largest single hospital in Denmark and one of the largest in Europe.

Aarhus University Hospital is the local hospital for citizens in Aarhus and the island of Samsø, but also offers specialised treatments to the citizens of the Central Denmark Region and other regions in Denmark. It has been ranked the best hospital in Denmark consecutively since 2008.

== History ==
The hospital was created as an administrative unit on 1 April 2011, when the two former university hospitals of Aarhus Sygehus and Skejby Sygehus were merged. Aarhus Sygehus was itself a merger from the four individual hospitals of Aarhus Municipal Hospital, Aarhus County Hospital, Marselisborg Hospital and Samsø Sygehus in 2007. The 2011 merger was performed in preparation for the New University Hospital (DNU) to be situated in Skejby in the northern parts of Aarhus.

== The New University Hospital ==
Det Nye Universitetshospital (The New University Hospital), or DNU for short, began construction in 2012 in Skejby, adjacent to the former hospital of Skejby Sygehus, as the new headquarters for Aarhus University Hospital, a building project that was finished in 2018. The New University Hospital is the biggest single hospital in Denmark and one of the biggest in Europe. As one of several new regional "super hospitals" across Denmark, DNU has gradually absorbed all former hospital departments of Aarhus University Hospital across the city, including Skejby Sygehus, a process that was completed in 2019. DNU became fully operational in 2022.

The New University Hospital employs a combined staff of 10,200 and contains 1,150 patient beds. There are a total of 44 clinical departments.

=== Psychiatric hospital ===
The New University Hospital (DNU) includes a psychiatric hospital, and a psychiatric trauma center, with a total floor area of 40,000 m2 and 260 patient beds. The hospital has been designed by architectural firm Arkitema with interior decorations by artist Tal R, and works as an independent department within the larger DNU complex. Next to the hospital is a center for forensic psychiatry, including detention.

== Sources ==
- "Health in Central Denmark Region". Central Denmark Region.
