= Jydske Asyl =

Coordinates: 56.1858°N 10.2325°E

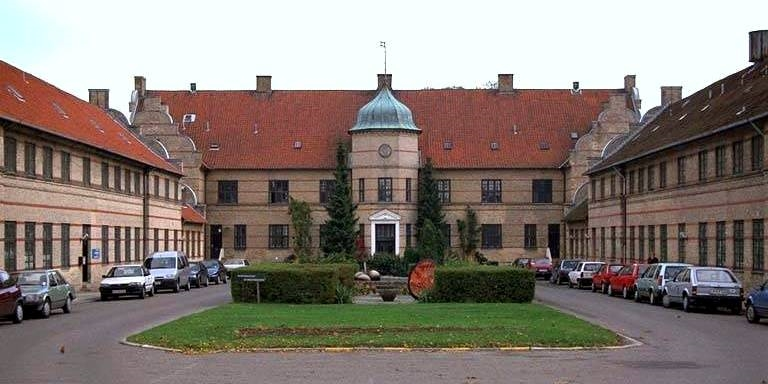
- Front facade of the original buildings
- Interactive map of the Jydske Asyl area

General information
- Architectural style: Historicist
- Location: Aarhus, Denmark
- Construction started: 1848
- Completed: 1850

Technical details
- Floor count: 3

Design and construction
- Architect: Gottlieb Bindesbøll

Jydske Asyl (Asylum of Jutland) is a listed building in Aarhus, Denmark constructed in 1850 and listed in the national Danish registry of protected buildings and places by the Danish Heritage Agency on 15 December 1997. It was built as a psychiatric hospital and functioned as such till the end of 2018.

From 2019, the historic buildings and surroundings are being redeveloped as a new residential area. The new neighborhood is known as Bindesbøll Byen and is planned to hold 1,200 residences in four sections at its completion. The project is designed by Danish architectural firm Arkitema Architects.

== History ==
In 1852, the hospital Helbredsanstalten for Sindssyge i Nørrejylland, colloquially known as Jydske Asyl, was inaugurated in Risskov. Previously, psychiatric care had more in common with imprisonment but on 13 October 1847 it was decided by royal decree that a hospital for proper psychiatric treatment should be built in Jutland. The construction was initiated by Frederik Ferdinand Friis but Gottlieb Bindesbøll later took over the process and finished it.

Initially the hospital had room for 130 patients but in 1856 and 1861 it was expanded to host 400 patients. During this period the hospital was also changed from treatment alone to a hosting facility for the incurably ill. In 1886–88, it was expanded again to 468 patients. The hospital has suffered frequent overcrowding and expansion has been continuous throughout the years. In 1857, a church was established by the hospital and in 1892 staff homes were added by architect Hack Kampmann. In the early 20th century, homes for nurses and doctors were built and later in 1968, more homes were added along with new a treatment and research department in a building called Psykiatrisk Institut.

In 1976, the hospital was given the name "Psykiatrisk Hospital i Aarhus" (Psychiatric Hospital in Aarhus) and in the 1990s, it was extensively renovated which further expanded patient capacity. In February 2008, political discussions opened up the possibility that the hospital could be moved to Skejby to the new large hospital complex there. The move was effectuated in late 2018, and by 2019 the buildings and surroundings are being redeveloped as a residential area known as Bindesbøll-Byen.

== Architecture ==
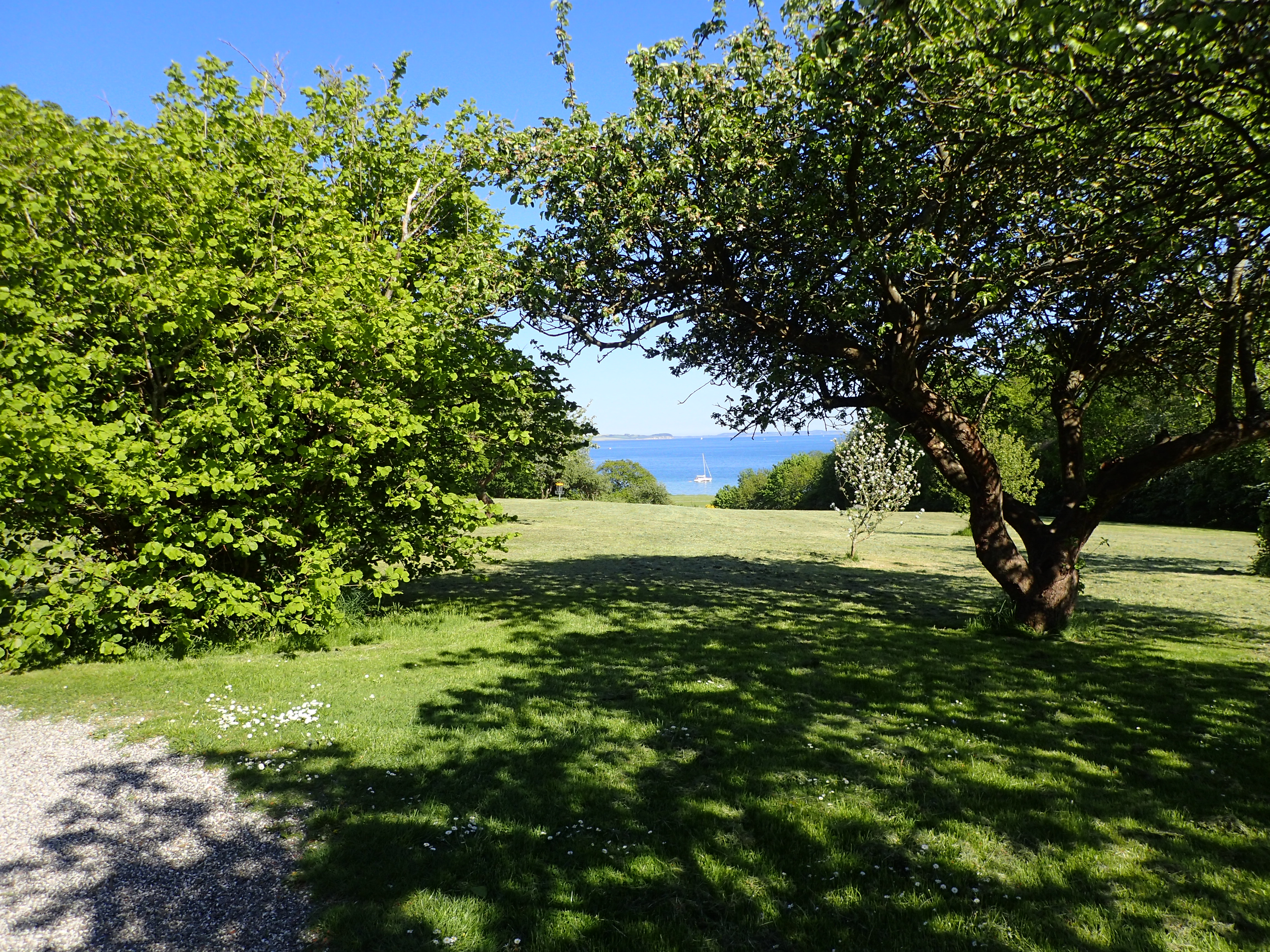
The large attached park (Risskov Park)

Bindesbøll created a solution for an institutional complex in the form of a 4-winged rectangular estate with 4 parallel wings. The buildings were constructed in yellow brick with horizontal red bands. The buildings have many details; semicircular brick connectors above white painted glass doors with cast lintels and olive green windows and shutters. Later additions have on the whole respected the original vision.
