= Skejby Sygehus =

- Central Denmark Region

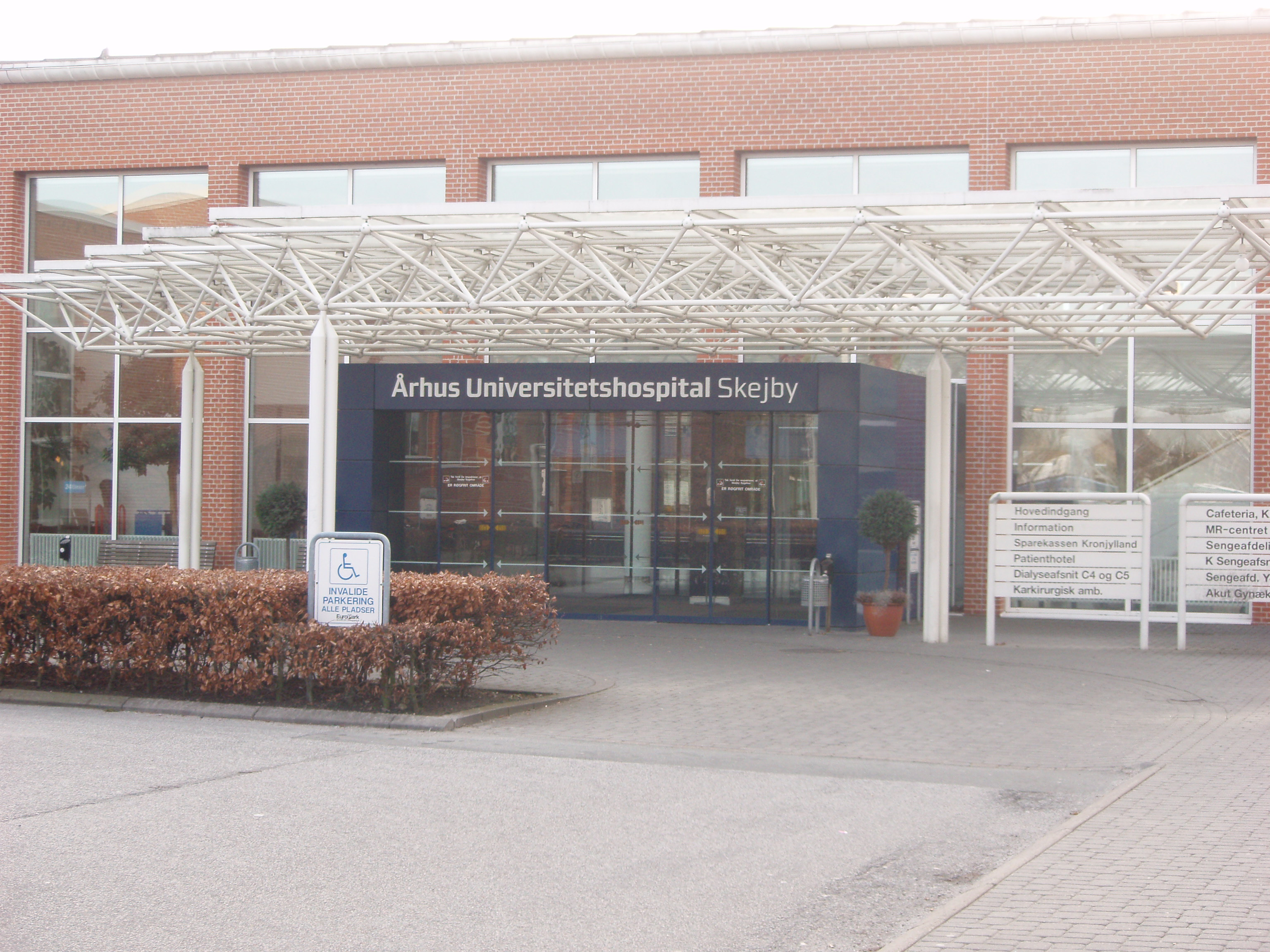
- Main entrance to Aarhus University hospital, Skejby

Geography
- Location: Skejby, Aarhus, Central Region, Denmark
- Coordinates: 56°11′30″N 10°10′20″E

Organisation
- Type: Teaching
- Affiliated university: Aarhus University

Services
- Emergency department: Yes

History
- Founded: 1988
- Closed: 2019

Links
- Website: www.auh.dk

Skejby Sygehus or Aarhus University Hospital, Skejby, located in the Skejby neighborhood of Aarhus, Denmark, was established in 1988 as a university hospital.

In 2011, Skejby Sygehus merged with Aarhus Sygehus to form Aarhus University Hospital in preparation for the construction of "Det Nye Universitetshospital" (The New University Hospital), or DNU for short, a new large headquarter complex the size of a small town for Aarhus University Hospital, which began in 2012 and finished in 2019. The new hospital complex is situated adjacent to Skejby Sygehus. When the project started, it was the largest building project in Northern Europe.
