= College town (disambiguation) =

A college town or university town is a settlement dominated by a university community. It may also refer to

- College Park, South Australia, formerly known as College Town
- College Town, Berkshire, England
- Collegetown, commercial district of Ithaca, New York
- Any of various housing or mixed-use developments serving particular university communities
- Any of various town and gown relations programs

== See also ==
- College City
- College Hill
- College Park
- College Township (disambiguation)
- University City
- University Hill
- University Park
- University town (disambiguation)
