= Aarhus C =

- Postal district
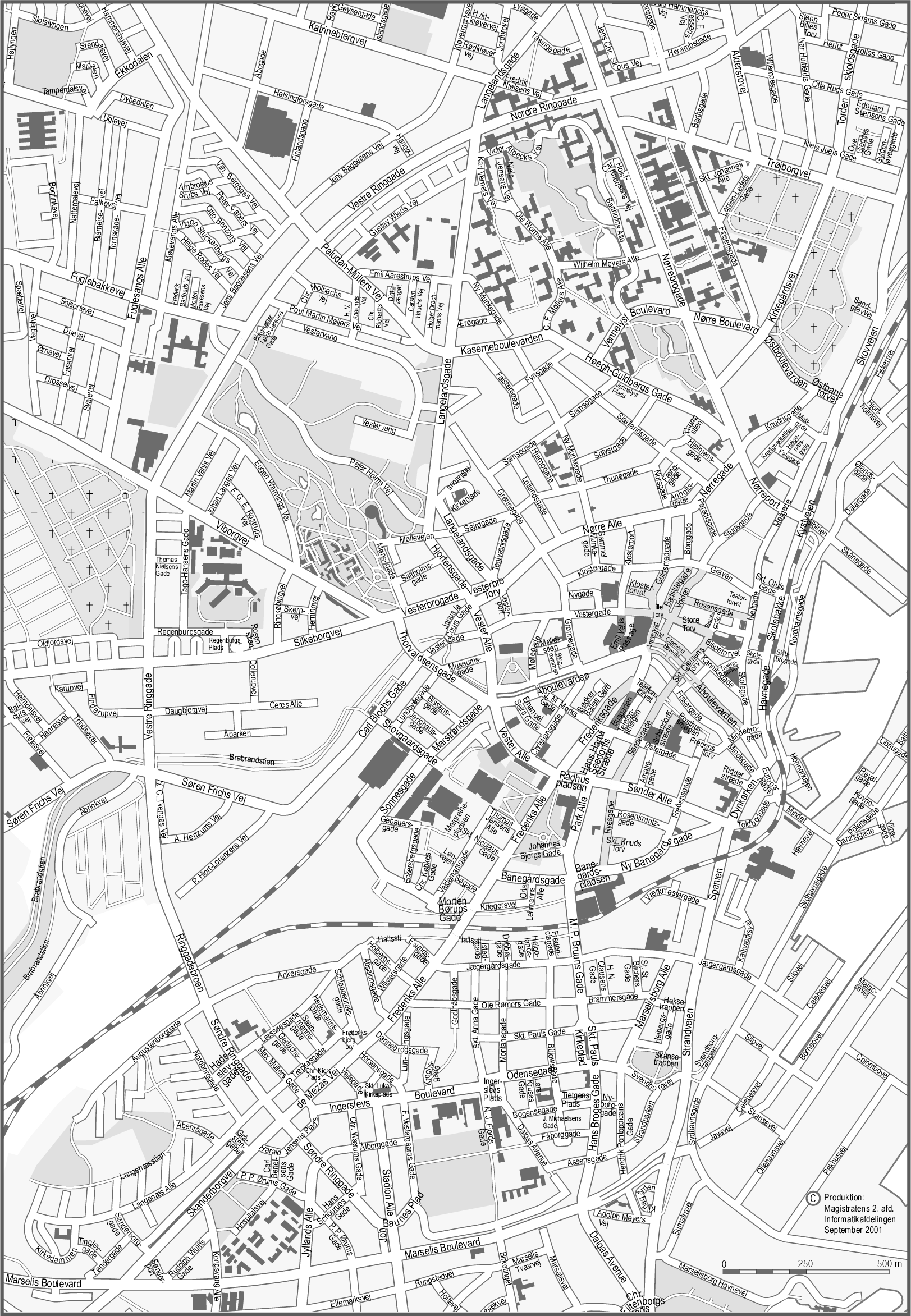
- Interactive map of Aarhus C
- Coordinates: 56°09′20″N 10°12′28″E
- Country: Denmark
- City: Aarhus

Population
  - Total: c. 80,000
- Demonym(s): Aarhusianer (English: Aarhusian)
- Postal code: 8000

Aarhus C is a postal district in the city of Aarhus, Denmark, consisting of the Inner city, Vesterbro, University of Aarhus, Frederiksbjerg, Langenæs and Aarhus Ø, with postal code 8000. The district is commonly defined as the area enclosed by the ring road of Ring 1 (also referred to as Ringgaden), and in the west by the Aarhus Harbour and shoreline.

Aarhus C is an abbreviation of Aarhus Centrum, which means "the centre of Aarhus" and is home to around 80000 citizens.

== Quarters and areas ==
=== Midtbyen ===
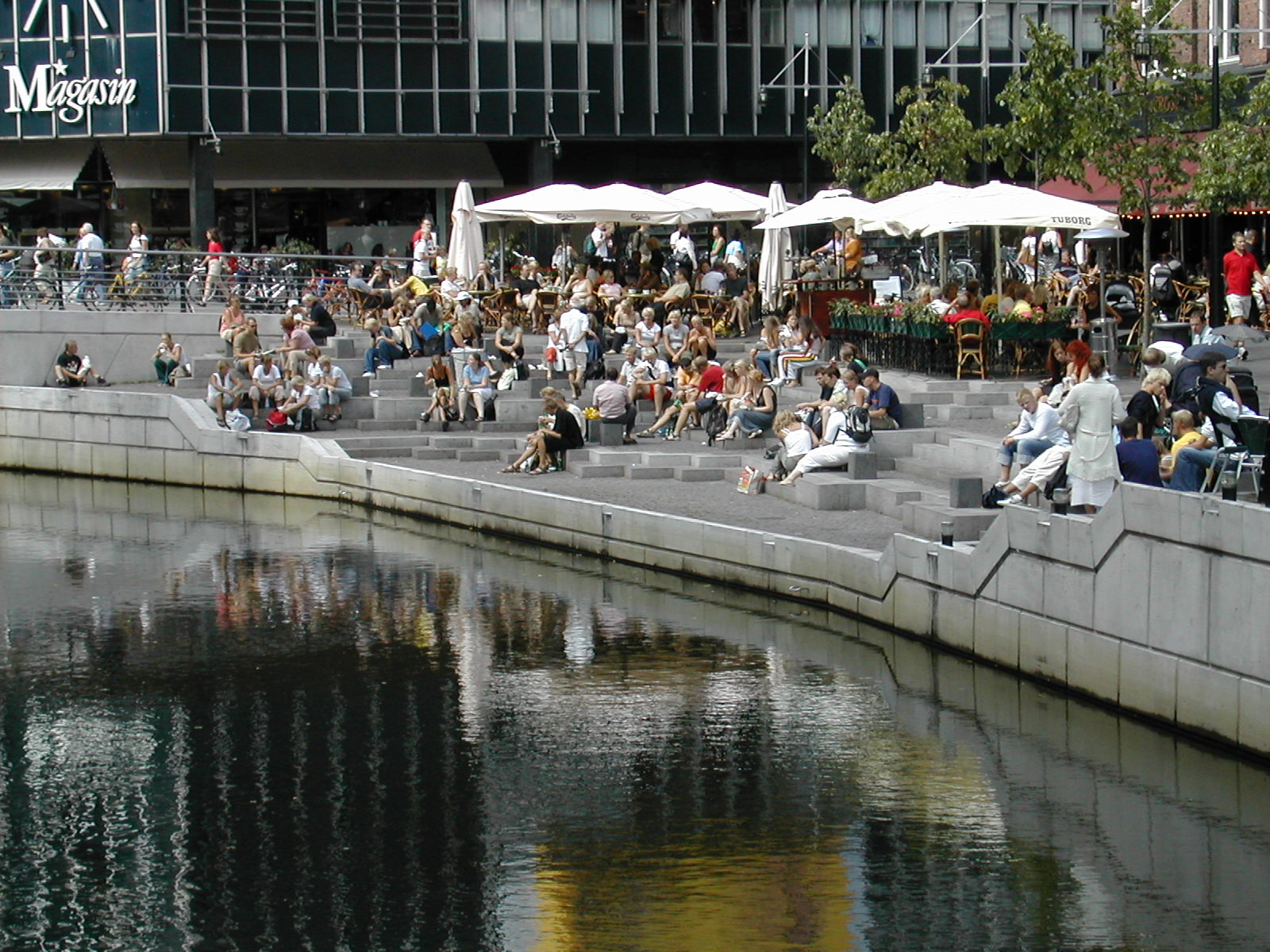
Aarhus Å (Aarhus River) flows through Midtbyen.

Midtbyen is the oldest part of Aarhus and was where the city originated, and is therefore known as the city's historical center. It is characterized by narrow, winding, cobbled streets and many small shops, and a large part of the area is car free and has been pedestrianised. The square of Store Torv in front of the cathedral forms a natural centre of the pedestrian zone. The main walking route through Midtbyen is the long pedestrian street of Strøget, which runs from the cathedral to the central train station. Apart from the small boutiques, Midtbyen also presents large department stores and the shopping centre Bruun's Galleri with 93 stores. The main routes by car in Midtbyen are via one of the three roads: Nørre Allé, Vestre Allé and Søndre Allé.

=== Vesterbro ===
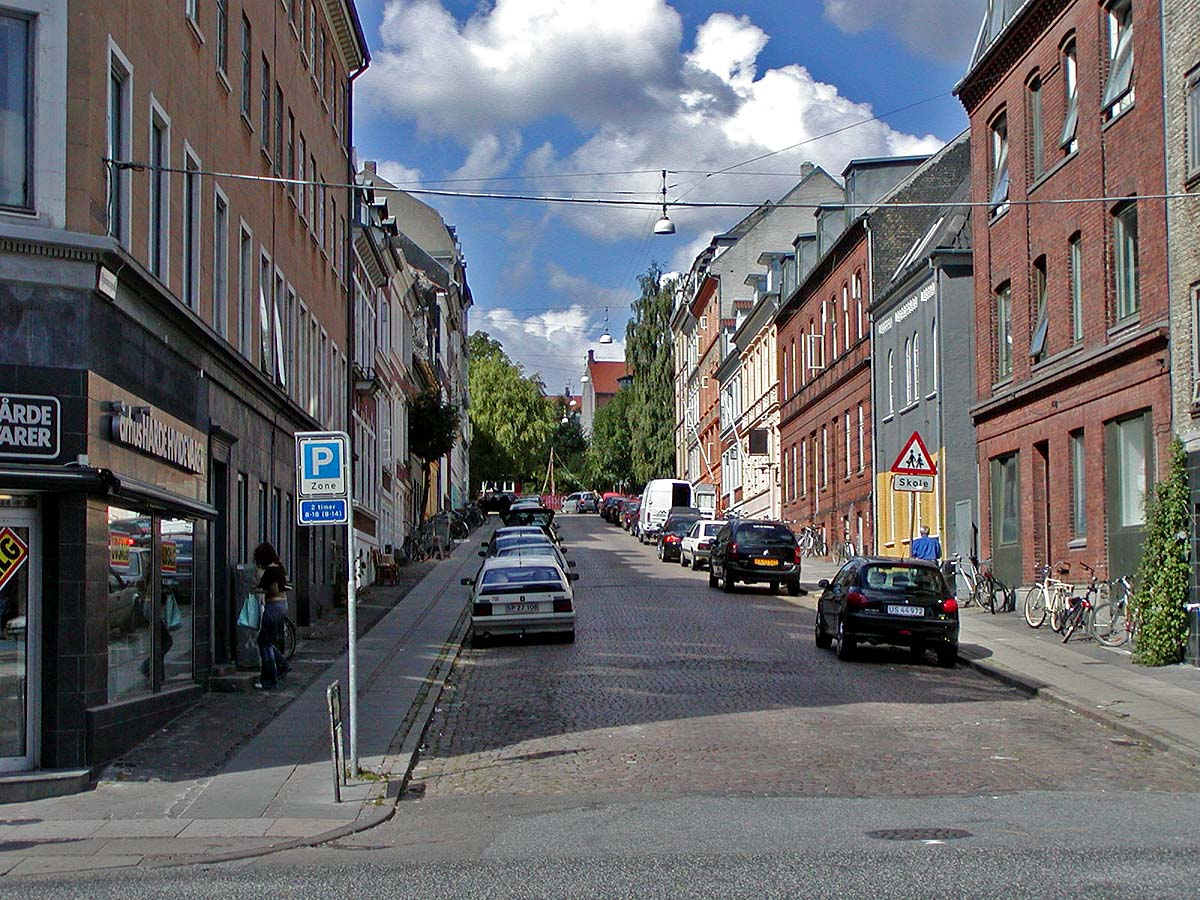
Narrow street in Vesterbro

Vesterbro should not be confused with Vesterbro in the capital, Copenhagen. Aarhus' Vesterbro is newer than Midtbyen, and was originally the western entrance to the town, which is why there are street names such as Vesterport, literally meaning Western-gate. The main square of Vesterbro Torv used to be a market square for pigs and other animals in the 1880s. Now it is the busiest junction in Vesterbro. Half a mile west of Vesterbro Torv is one of the city's most famous landmarks, Den Gamle By, located within Aarhus Botanical Gardens. Right next to Den Gamle By is the now defunct Ceres Brewery from 1856. The site of the old brewery is currently being transformed and rebuilt into a new neighbourhood of Vesterbro, presenting educational institutions, residential apartments, offices and businesses.

=== Frederiksbjerg ===
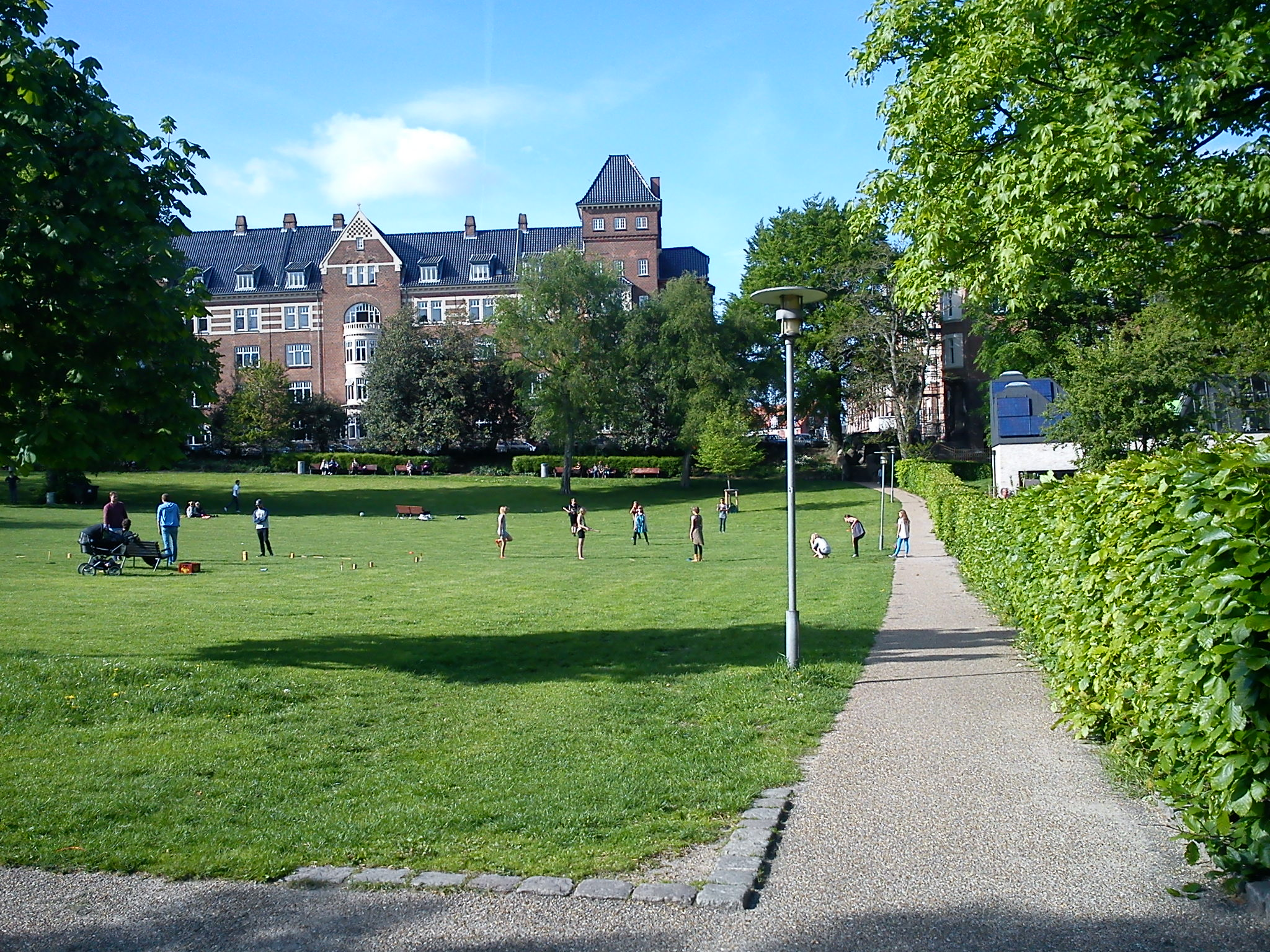
Skanseparken, Frederiksbjerg. Small city parks are numerous in Aarhus C.

Frederiksbjerg is located south of Midtbyen and the central station. Its name literally means Frederik's hill or mountain. Separated by a wide railway yard, it is connected to the inner city by three bridges. It is inhabited by approximately 20,000 people.

Frederiksbjerg has around 400 shops mainly located in the three large shopping streets Bruunsgade, Jægergårdsgade, Frederiks Allé. Frederiks Allé is a main route leading into the City from the suburbs, and going out of Frederiksbjerg it changes name to Skanderborgvej, as it historically was the main road to the town of Skanderborg. Frederiksbjerg is a quieter part of Aarhus C, with most buildings dating from the beginning of the 20th century, and with many large apartments, suitable for families with children.

=== Aarhus Docklands ===
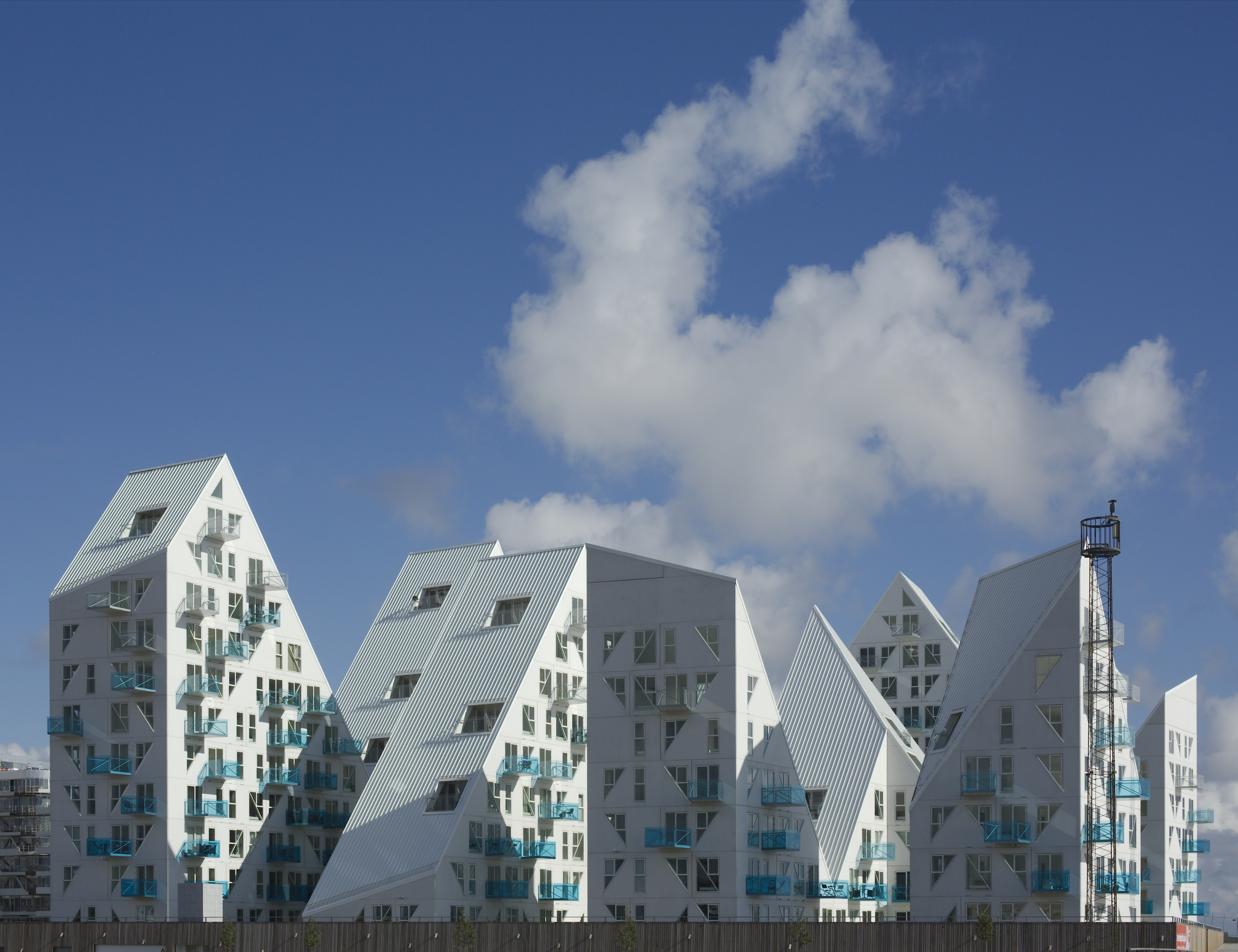
Isbjerget (lit.: the iceberg) one of the new apartment blocks in Aarhus Docklands.

Aarhus Docklands is the newest part of Aarhus C. The area is founded on both newly constructed land and former wharves, bought by the municipality from the Port of Aarhus company in 2007 and is not yet fully developed. There have been many ambitious development projects here, including the proposition of a 144m tall Lighthouse building, which would have become Denmark's tallest building. Parts of this project were postponed due to the 2008 financial crisis. The city plans to develop Aarhus Docklands as a new modern neighbourhood with canals, parks and modern architecture.

=== University of Aarhus ===
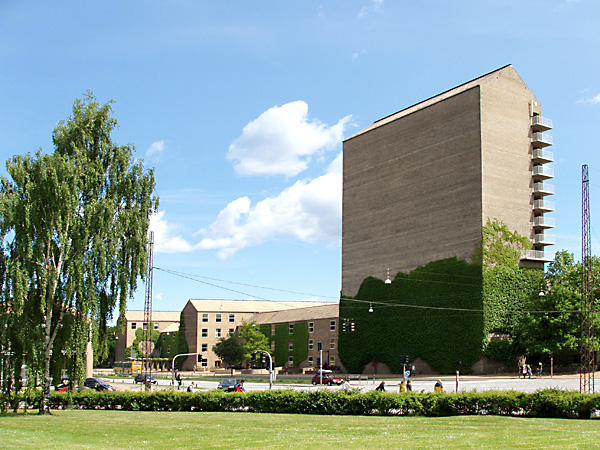
The Book Tower, in yellow brick and tile, is a landmark for Aarhus University.

The main campus of University of Aarhus is located immediately north of Midtbyen, with most buildings situated in and around the recreational parks of Universitetsparken and Vennelystparken. The whole campus, including the parks, has been designed with a common architectural design, characterized by yellow brick and tile, and the landscaped park was protected by national law in 1993. New buildings - also in yellow brick and tile - have continuously been added in and around the original campus ever since construction began in 1932. Aarhus University also administers other departments and buildings across town, including Nobelparken completed in 2004 just north of the original campus.

== Landmarks and institutions ==
- Aarhus Cathedral (Danish: Århus Domkirke), the tallest and longest cathedral in Denmark
- Church of Our Lady, an old historic church with attached priory
- Aarhus City Hall
- Aarhus University (Danish: Aarhus Universitet)
- Science Museums, 3 public science museums across the city
- State and University Library (Statsbiblioteket)
- Den Gamle By, an open-air museum
- Royal Academy of Music in Aarhus (Danish: Det Jyske Musikkonservatorium), the Juttish music conservatory.
- Aarhus Botanical Gardens (Danish: Botanisk Have)
- ARoS Aarhus Kunstmuseum, the main Aarhus arts museum
- Aarhus Kunstbygning, contemporary arts centre
- Aarhus Theatre, the official theater of the city
- Kvindemuseet, the Women's Museum

== Transportation ==
Aarhus C is more or less defined as the area enclosed by the ring road of Ring 1 (Ringgaden), one of the main traffic routes in Aarhus. Six main roads radiates outwards from Aarhus C, connecting to nearby larger cities. This comprise the roads of Grenåvej, Randersvej, Viborgvej, Silkeborgvej, Skanderborgvej and Oddervej.

=== Bicycles ===
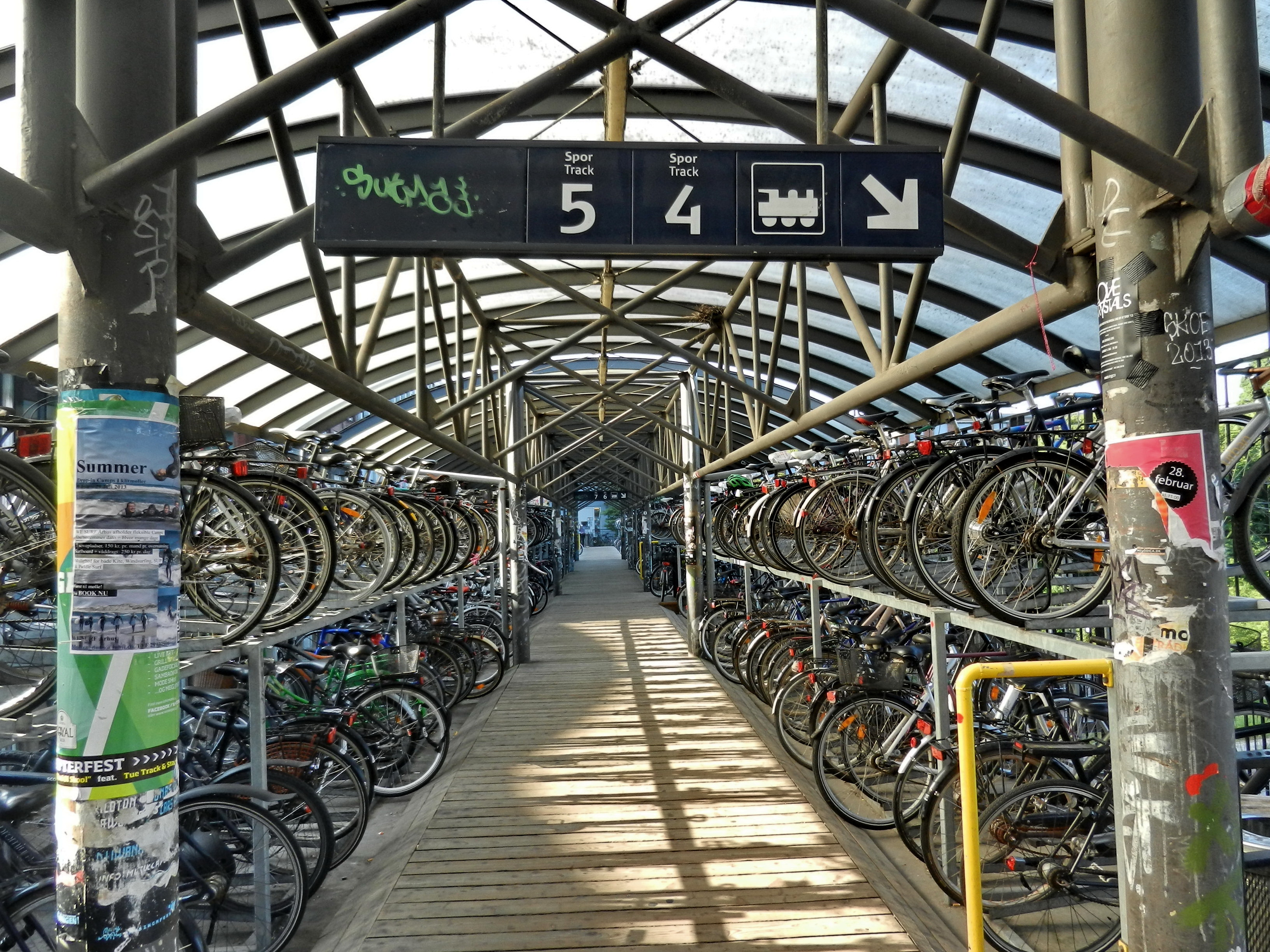
Bicycle parking at Aarhus Central Station

Bicycles are a popular vehicle for transportation in all of Denmark. Most major roads have bicycle lanes reserved for cyclists and the cycling infrastructure is highly developed. In Aarhus, new routes prioritized for cyclists have opened in the 2000s and this includes the streets of Skolegade, Mejlgade and Frederiks Gade in Aarhus C. The shared bikeways of Brabrandstien and Hallssti (and others), used by both pedestrians and cyclists have been in operation for many years, however. Many major roads in the central district have bicycle lanes or some other form of cycling infrastructure, but not all. Two national and five regional cycling routes pass through Aarhus C.

Aarhus City Bikes (Aarhus Bycykel) is a public bicycle-sharing system with around 50 hubs in Aarhus C and a few in Aarhus N. The system is only in operation from April through October.

Bike taxi services has been popping up in Aarhus C in the 2010s. Some companies rides customers all year round, also on trips outside Aarhus C occasionally. Bike taxis are not a common sight in the city, but can sometimes be picked up at the central spots of Banegårdspladsen, Lille Torv, Store Torv, Åboulevarden or near ordinary taxicab services and they tend to be more active during weekends, city festivals and larger events.

=== Bus ===
Aarhus, and Aarhus C in particular, has a tight net of bus lines. Most city bus lines go through the inner city with stops at either Park Allé or Banegårdspladsen (Central Station Square) or both. Many lines continue through Midtbyen, by a special road-lane reserved for buses, with several stops. County and Inter-city buses terminate at Aarhus Bus Terminal, located immediately north east of the Central Station.

=== Car ===
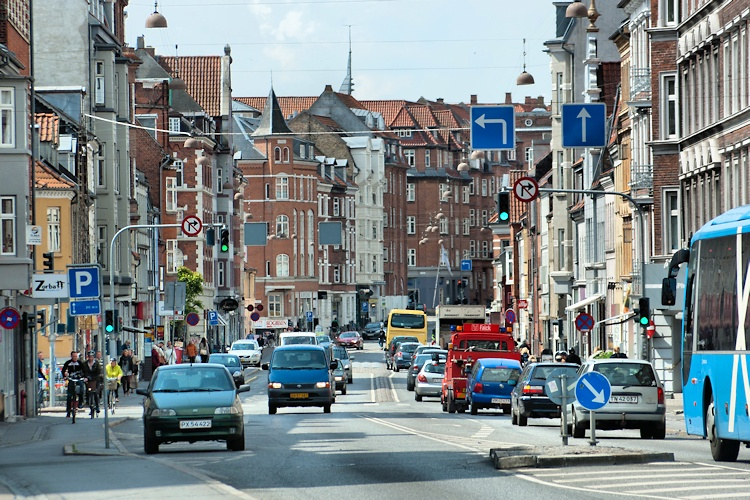
Several roads in Aarhus C are heavy with motorized traffic, but in most of the district car traffic is highly regulated.

Apart from a few major roads, car traffic in Aarhus C is heavily regulated. This includes speed limits, one-way streets, roads prioritized for cyclists and restricted areas. There are several large commercial car parking facilities and a system of electronic road-side panels display the changing parking load in an effort to make more efficient use of the parking space altogether. Finding a legal and available spot for road-side parking, is difficult.

=== Rail ===
Aarhus is connected to the rest of Denmark with inter-city and commuter rail, and Aarhus Central Station serves as a major hub for rail traffic in Denmark. Many trains terminates here while others pass through and continue to other parts of the country. The station is mainly served by DSB, but Arriva also has several lines terminating here.

There is no metro or S-train system in Aarhus to serve the city itself, but Aarhus Light Rail opened in December 2017. It is an electrically propelled tram system and the first of its kind in Denmark. The light rail will be expanded with more lines in the coming years.

=== Walking ===
Larger parts of the inner city of Aarhus has been pedestrianized and walking is an easy, safe and popular means of transportation in Aarhus C. Many important facilities and institutions are located within the district and easily reached on foot. Wheel-chair ramps and elevators for the handicapped are to be found in all public buildings in Denmark and this includes Aarhus as well. Public toilets in the streets are almost exclusively coin-operated, automatic, pay toilets and unisex, so it is advised to stack a few spare coins in the pocket.

== Gallery ==
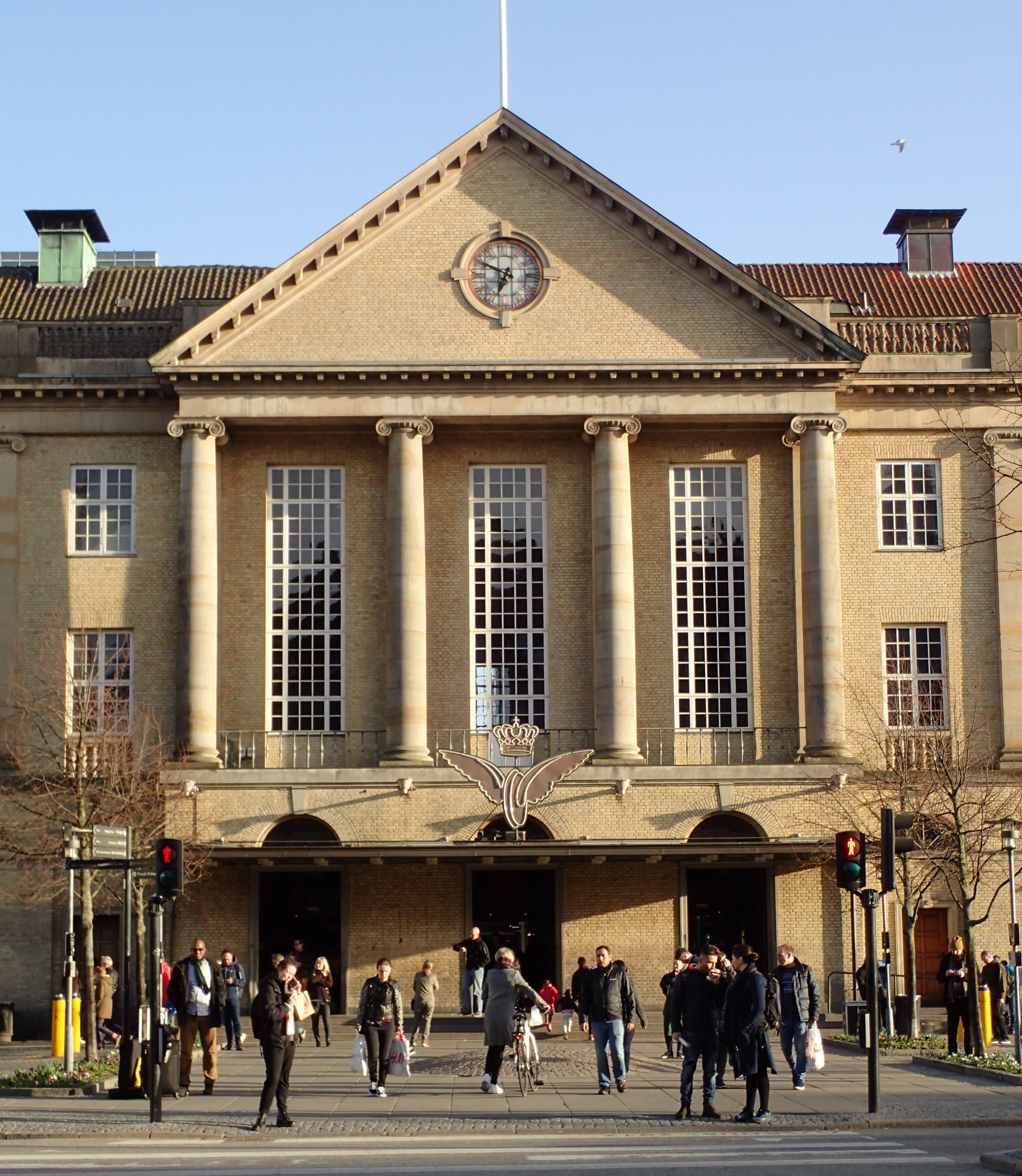
Aarhus Central Station

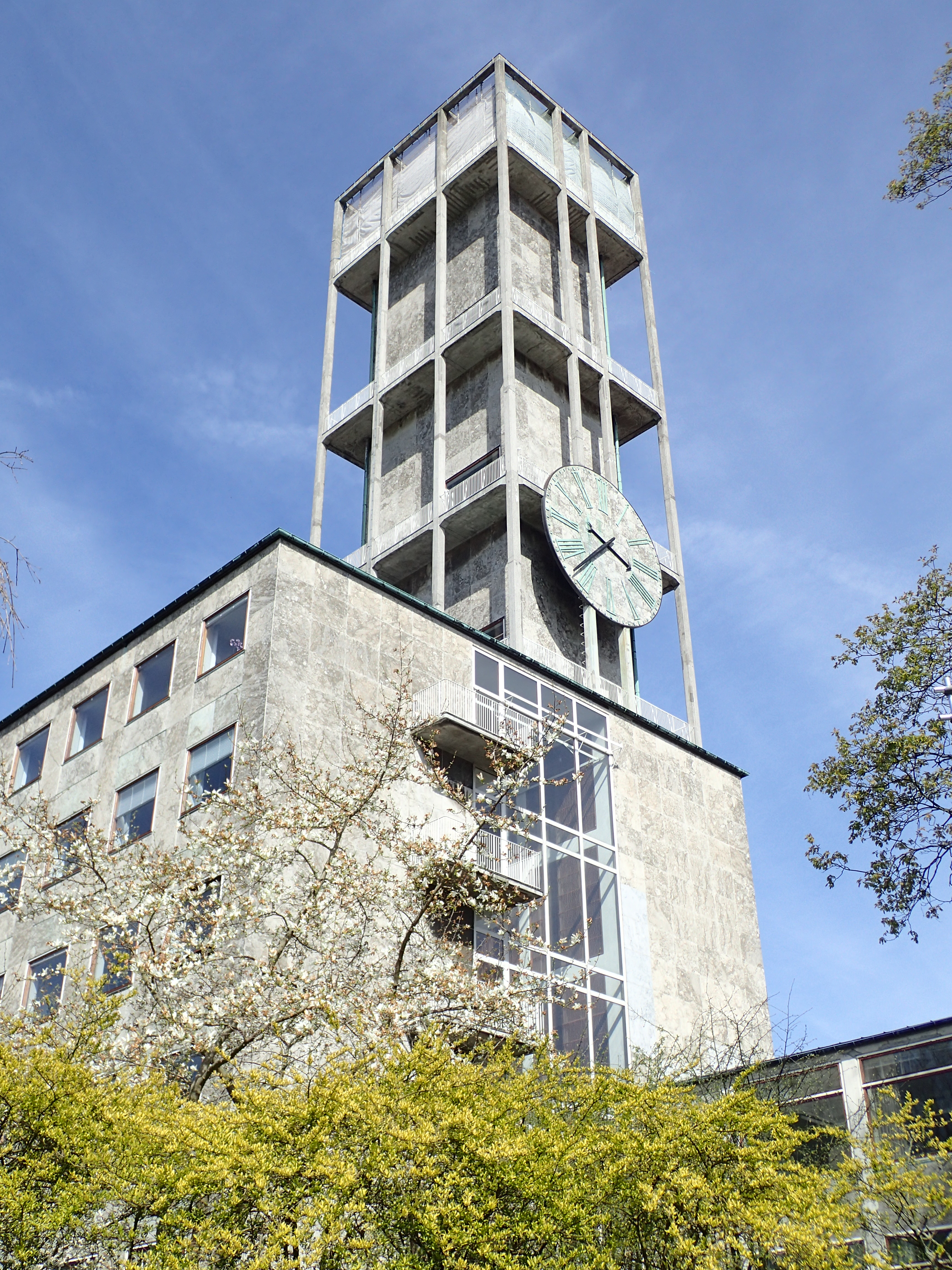
Aarhus City Hall

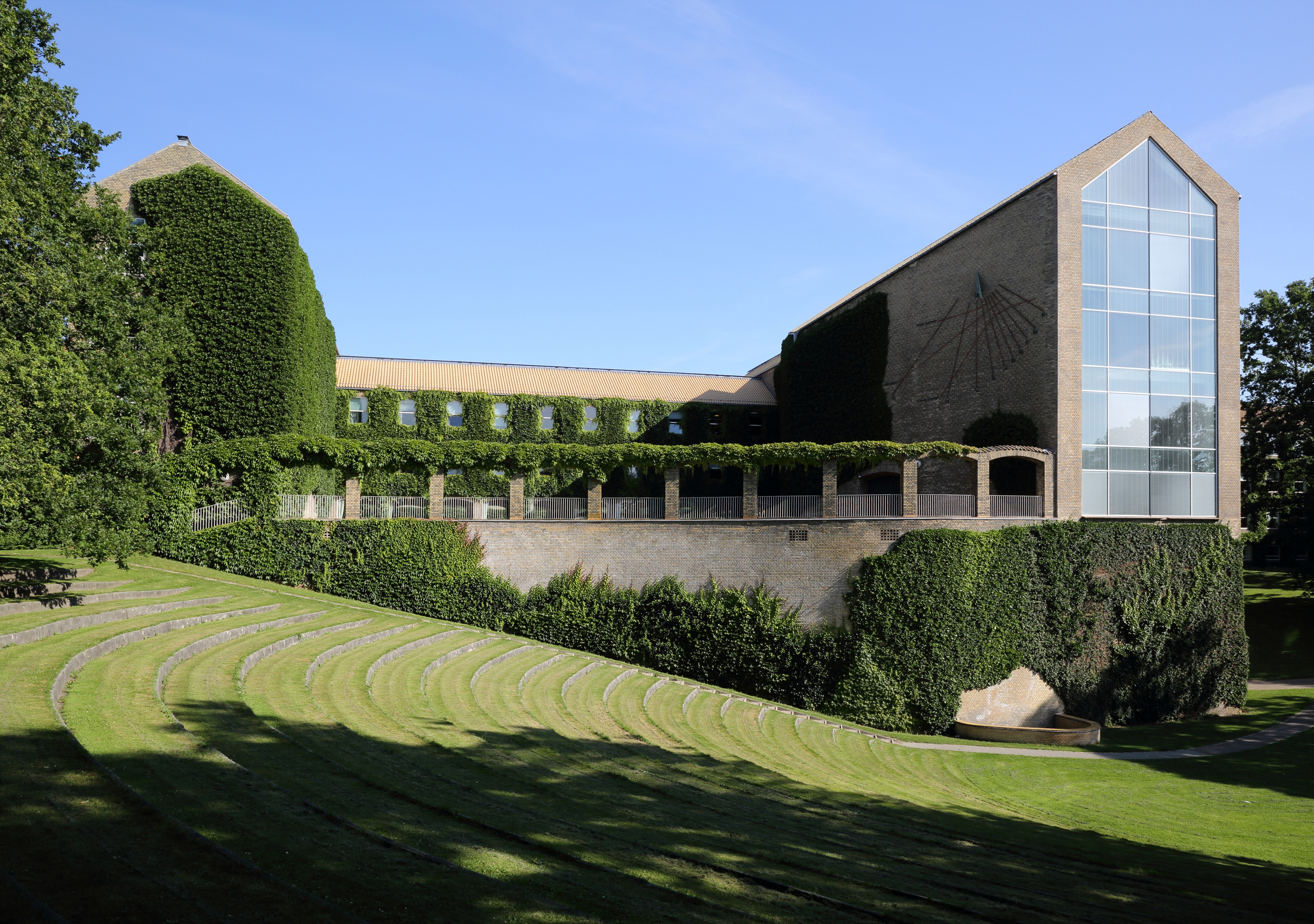
Aarhus University

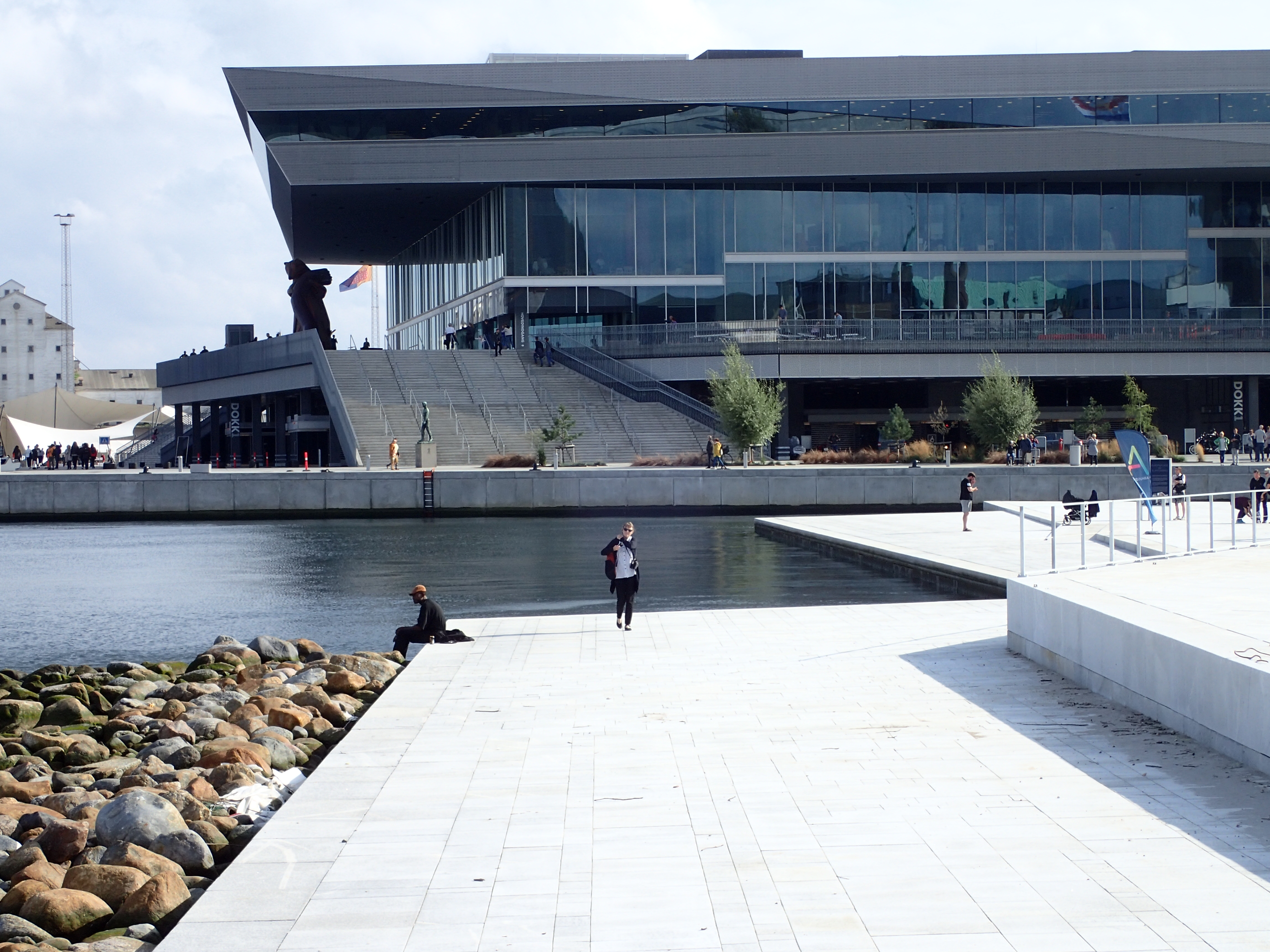
Dokk1 and the newly developed inner harbour area

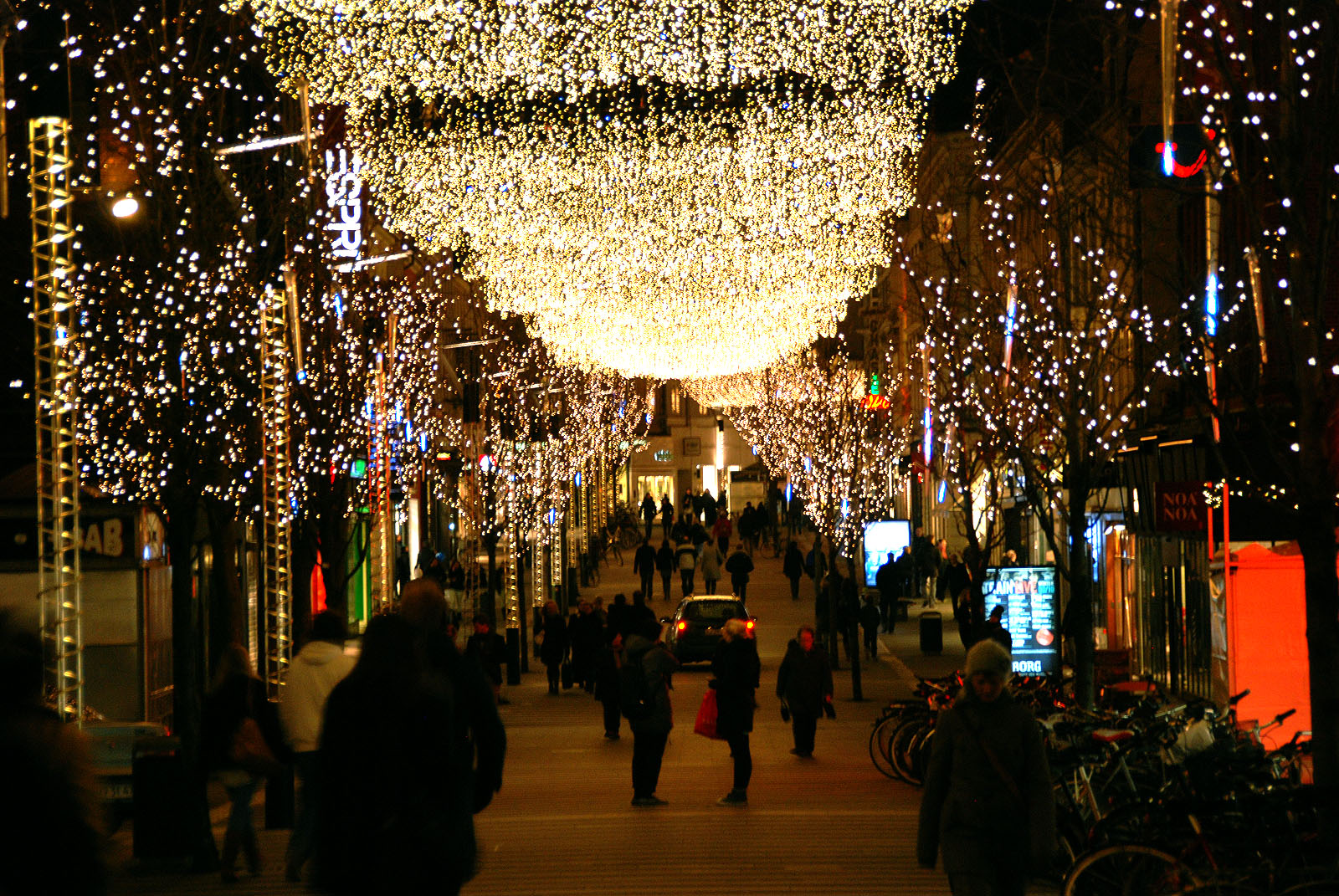
Strøget, decorated for Christmas. The inner city is popular with shoppers year round.

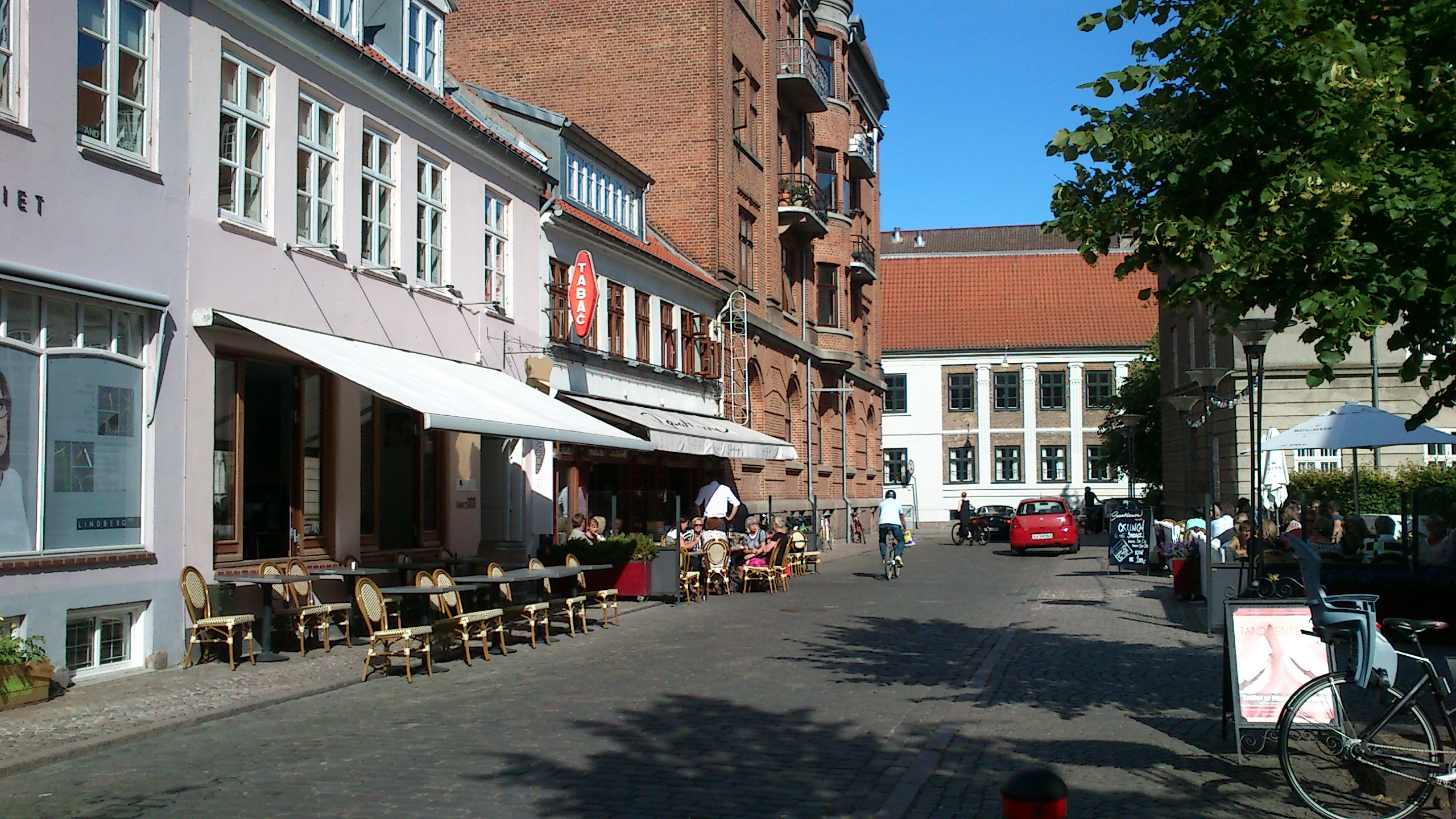
Cafés and small shops in Latinerkvarteret.

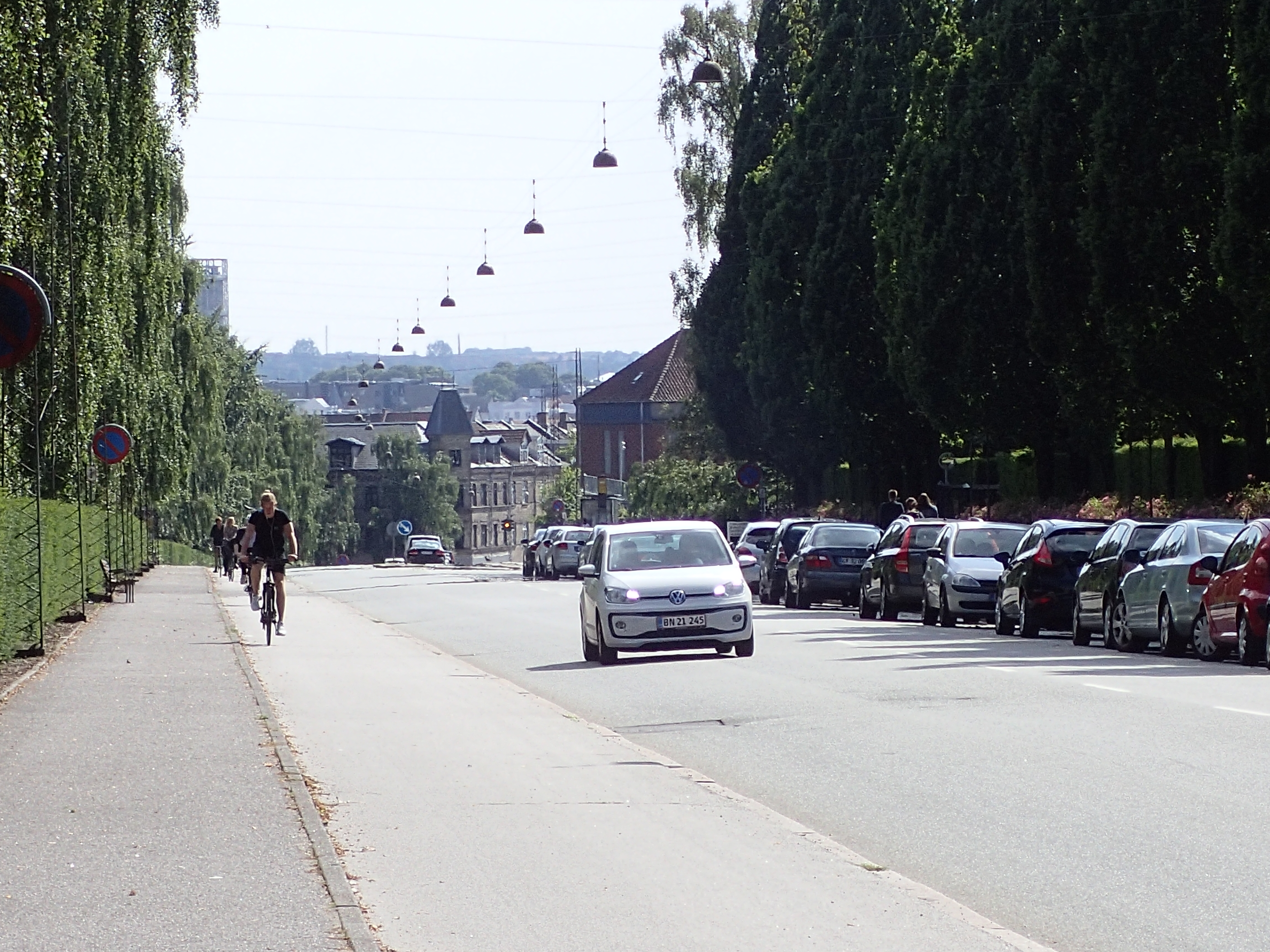
All streets have sidewalk space and major roads have cycle lanes

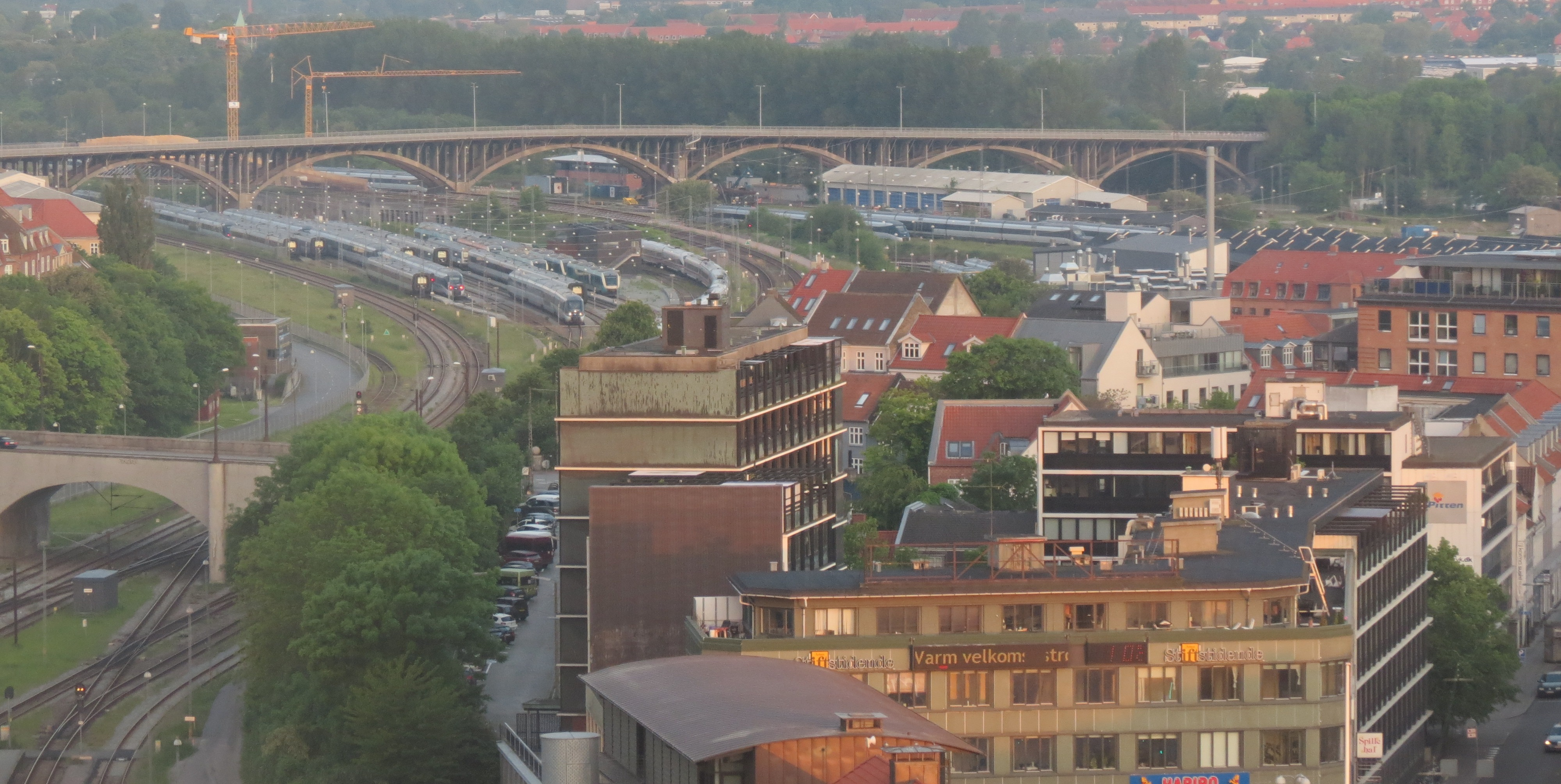
The ring road of Ring 1, encircles the district of Aarhus C.

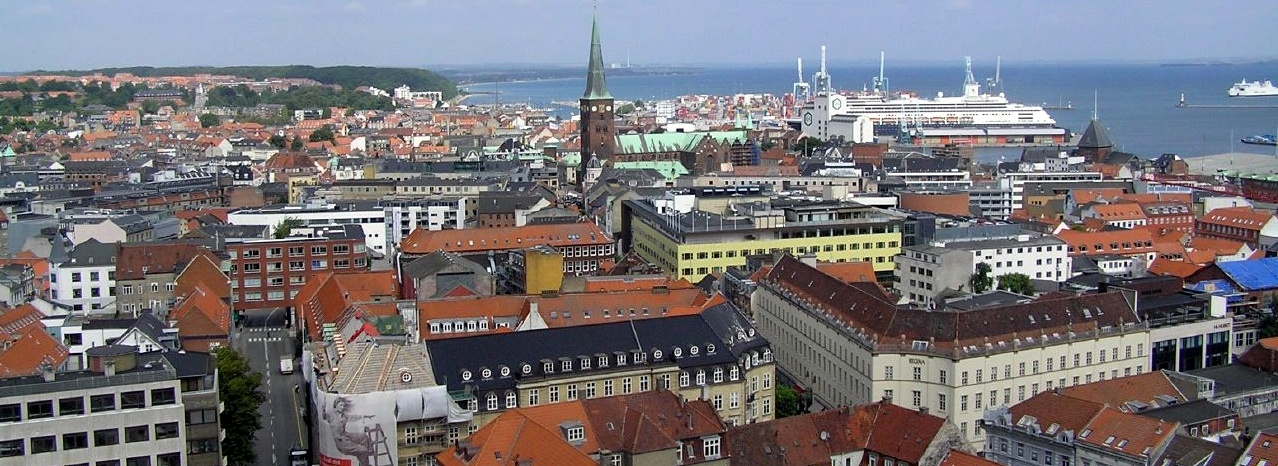
Skyline along the coast

== See also ==
Other postal districts in Aarhus includes:

- Aarhus N
- Aarhus V
- Viby J
- Højbjerg
- Brabrand
