= WZU =

WZU may refer to:

- Wenzao Ursuline University of Languages, a university in Kaohsiung, Taiwan
- Wenzhou University, a university in Wenzhou, Zhejiang
