= College Park =

College Park may refer to:

== Places ==
=== Canada ===
- College Park, Alberta, a neighbourhood of Red Deer
- College Park, a community in the town of Oakville, Ontario
- College Park, Saskatoon, Saskatchewan, a neighbourhood

=== United States ===
- College Park, San Jose, California, a neighborhood of San Jose
- College Park (Oxnard), a municipal recreation area in Ventura County, California
- College Park, Delaware, an unincorporated community
- College Park, Orlando, a neighborhood of Orlando, Florida
- College Park, Georgia, a city, a suburb of Atlanta
- College Park, Maryland, a city, a suburb of Washington, DC
- College Park (Virginia Beach), a neighborhood in the Kempsville section of Virginia Beach, Virginia
- College Park National Historic District, North Tacoma, Tacoma, Washington

=== Elsewhere ===
- College Park, South Australia, a suburb of Adelaide
- College Park, London, a neighbourhood

== Schools in the United States ==
- University of Maryland, College Park, the flagship state university of Maryland
- College Park High School (Pleasant Hill, California)
- The Woodlands College Park High School, The Woodlands, Texas

== Sports ==
- College Park Skyhawks, an American professional basketball team in the NBA G League based in College Park, Georgia
- College Park (Charleston), a stadium in Charleston, South Carolina
- College Park Center, an indoor, multi-purpose arena on the University of Texas at Arlington campus in Arlington, Texas
- College Park, Dublin, Ireland, a cricket ground

== Transportation ==
- College Park Airport, Prince George's County, Maryland, United States
- College Park station (Caltrain), a train station in San Jose, California, United States

== Other uses ==
- College Park (Toronto), a shopping mall, residential and office complex in Toronto, Ontario, Canada
- College Park (album), a studio album by American rapper Logic

== See also ==
- University Park (disambiguation)
- Parks College (disambiguation)
- College Park East, Saskatoon, a neighbourhood
