= University Park =

University Park may refer to:

In the United States:

- University Park, Los Angeles, California, home of the University of Southern California
- University Park, Irvine, California, home of the University of California, Irvine
- University Park, Florida, in Miami-Dade County, home of Florida International University
- University, Orange County, Florida (sometimes shown as "University Park"), a neighbor of the University of Central Florida
- University Park, Illinois, home of Governors State University
  - University Park station
- University Park (Indianapolis, Indiana), on the National Register of Historic Places
- University Park, Iowa, home of Vennard College
- University Park, James Madison University
- University Park, Maryland, a town neighboring College Park (home of the University of Maryland, College Park)
- University Park at MIT, Cambridge, Massachusetts
- University Park, New Mexico, a suburb of Las Cruces (home of New Mexico State University)
- University Park (Grand Forks, North Dakota), one of Grand Forks, North Dakota's parks
- University Park, Pennsylvania, the postal designation for Penn State University Park, consisting of the main campus of Pennsylvania State University
- University Park Airport, regional airport serving Penn State University
- University Park, Portland, Oregon, a neighborhood in Portland
- University Park, Texas, home of Southern Methodist University
- University Park (Worcester, Massachusetts), a public park close to Clark University
- University of Houston (formerly University of Houston–University Park)
- University Park (Stillwater, Oklahoma), former home ballpark of Oklahoma State Cowboys baseball
- Route 128 station in Dedham and Westwood, Massachusetts, serving MBTA and Amtrak train lines, also known as University Park station

In England:

- University Park Campus, Nottingham, a University of Nottingham campus
- University Parks, a large parkland area near Oxford

In Scotland:

- University Park, St Andrews, home of University of St Andrews RFC

In Denmark:

- University Park, Aarhus, a park
- University Park (University of Copenhagen), a part of the University of Copenhagen's North Campus

In Peru:

- University Park, Lima, a park located in central Lima

== See also ==
- College Park (disambiguation)
- University Park Historic District (disambiguation)
