= University town (disambiguation) =

- College town
- University Town (Miskolc)
- University Town, Peshawar
- University Town of Shenzhen
- University Town Center
- University Town Plaza
- University Town (Chashan)
- University Towne Center, San Diego, California
