= Vennelystparken =

Park in Aarhus, Denmark

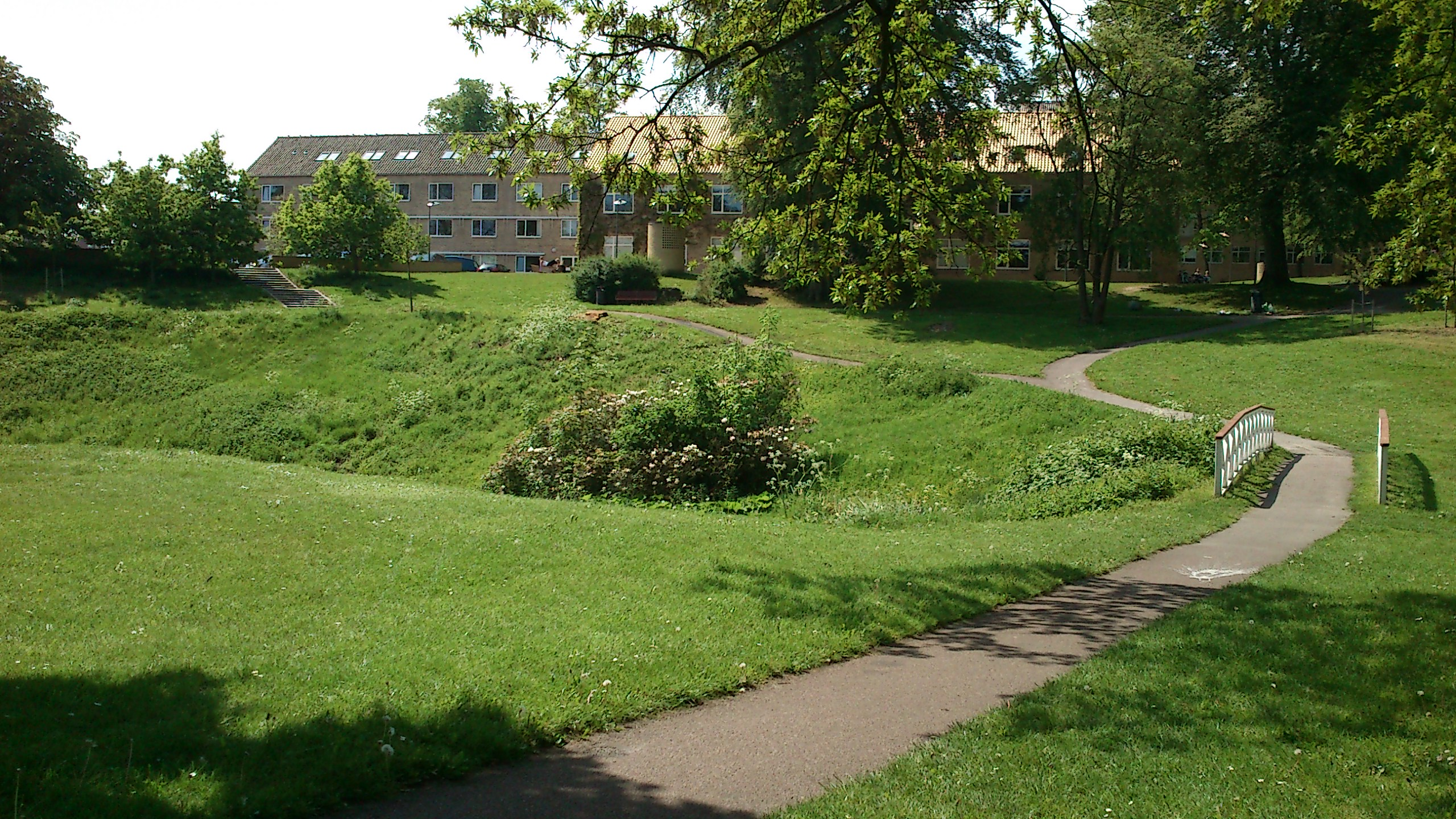
- The undulating park grounds
- Interactive map of Vennelystparken
- Type: Urban park
- Location: Aarhus, Denmark
- Coordinates: 56°09′54″N 10°12′27″E
- Area: 17 acres (6.9 ha)
- Created: 1830
- Owner: Aarhus Municipality

Vennelystparken is the oldest park in the city of Aarhus, constructed in the years 1824 to 1830 between the streets Vennelyst Boulevard and Nørrebrogade. Through the 19th century up to the Second World War the park was a social focal point in Aarhus hosting revues, circusses, plays and concerts in changing venues. The park is now part of the Aarhus University campus in Midtbyen. The park no longer has any venues but is frequently used for open-air concerts and protests and functions as the local park of the neighborhood Øgadekvarteret.

Vennelystparken contains large undulating, grassy areas with a lake and stream cutting through, and is characterized by beech and chestnut trees.

== History ==
The area was originally a rough and muddy field used for grazing cattle, but in 1824 Julius Høegh-Guldberg rented the area of Aarhus Municipality for a period of 25 years, with the intention of creating a new commercial recreational area. In 1830, the new park opened under the name Vennelystparken after extensive landscaping. The park was a fenced, guarded and required a fee for entry, but still became a popular recreational destination for the Aarhus citizens.

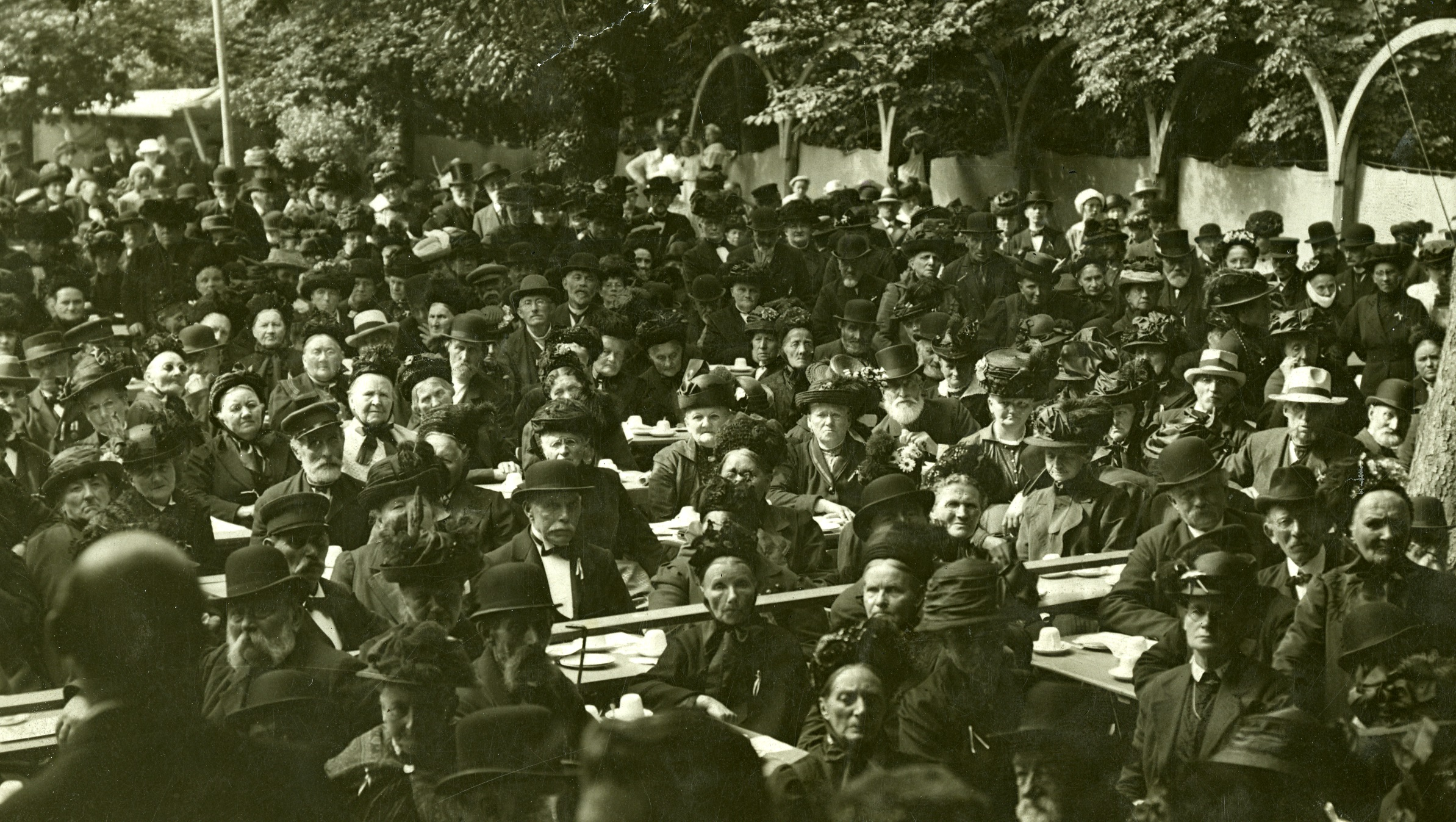
Vennelystparken c. 1900, patrons at an unknown performance at Vennelystparken

In 1849, permission was given to build a small theatre in the park, initiating a century long cultural high-point in the history of the park. The theatre hosted innumerable parties, social events, concerts, song performances and became the usual venue for touring theatre groups, vaudeville and circuses. Fireworks and hot air balloon shows, were also popular and in 1880 the first summer revue was held, a tradition that lasted 60 years. In the fall of 1896, a "Sami-caravane" consisting of two Sami families, eight reindeer and their dogs, became an exhibition and attraction. The theatre was decorated in a suitably winterish landscape and entrants were charged a fee to see performances. The Sami dogs multiplied during their stay, and became high fashion in Aarhus at the time.

In 1897, a new wooden venue was built, designed by Thorvald Jørgensen in National Romantic style, with a characteristic 35m tall lookout tower. It burned in 1908 but the year after a new theatre was built, supplemented by an outdoor scene in 1910. The upper social classes started frequenting the park at this time and it was a fashionable and popular location through the 1920s and 1930s. In January 1945, in the latter months of the German occupation, the Vennelyst Theatre was bombed during a schalburgtage terror attack. It was never rebuilt and the park today remains open-air.

In 1957, Aarhus University expanded its campus to include Vennelystparken. Architect C. F. Møller designed a building for education in Journalism and many other buildings has followed, including education buildings for nurses and dentists, student housing and an arts museum. In 1973 the journalist education moved to the Danish School of Media and Journalism and in 2002, the arts museum moved out and has exhibited in the ARoS Aarhus Kunstmuseum since 2004. Today all the buildings are owned and administered by Aarhus University and used for education, research or housing.

== Gallery ==
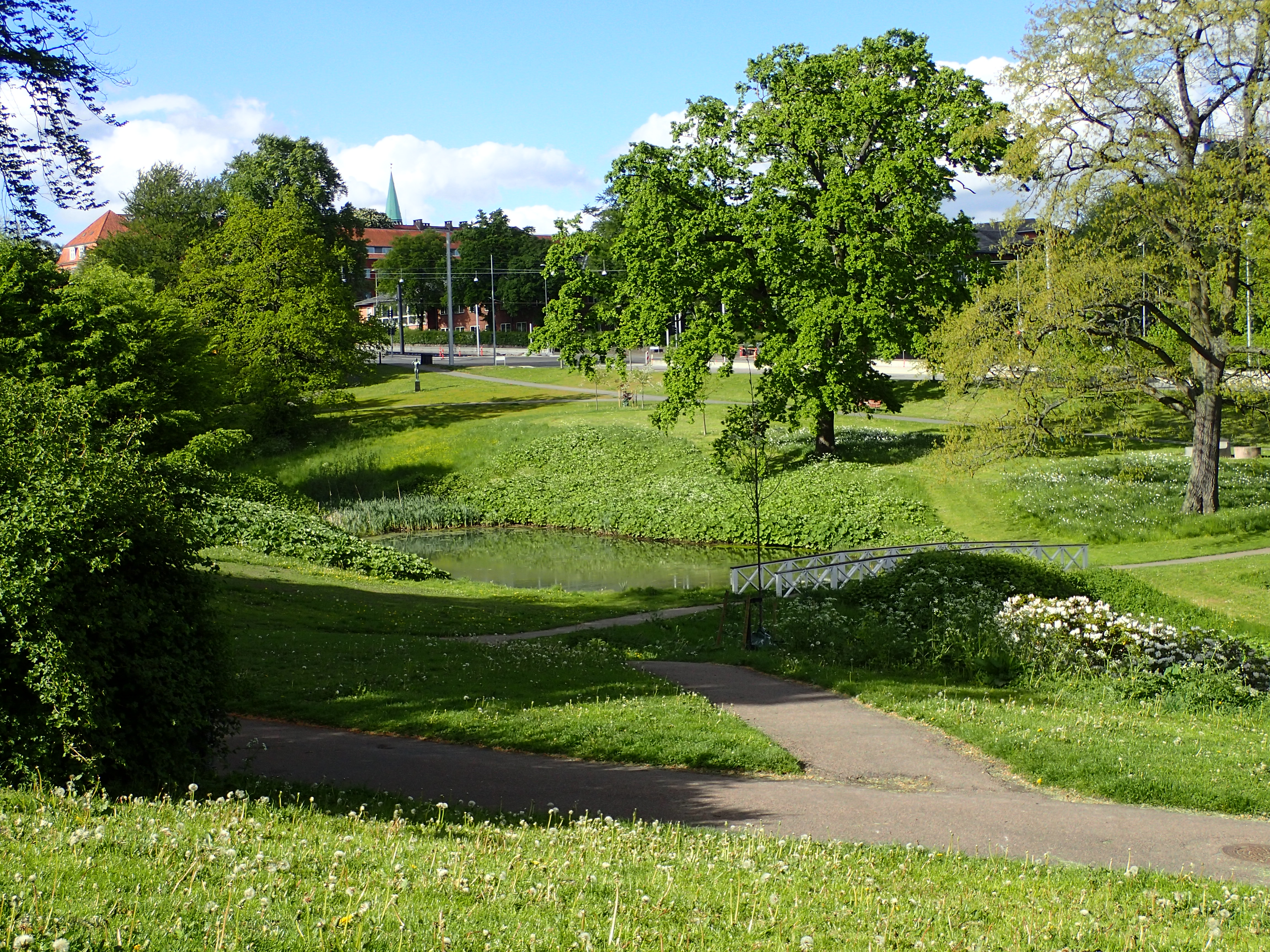

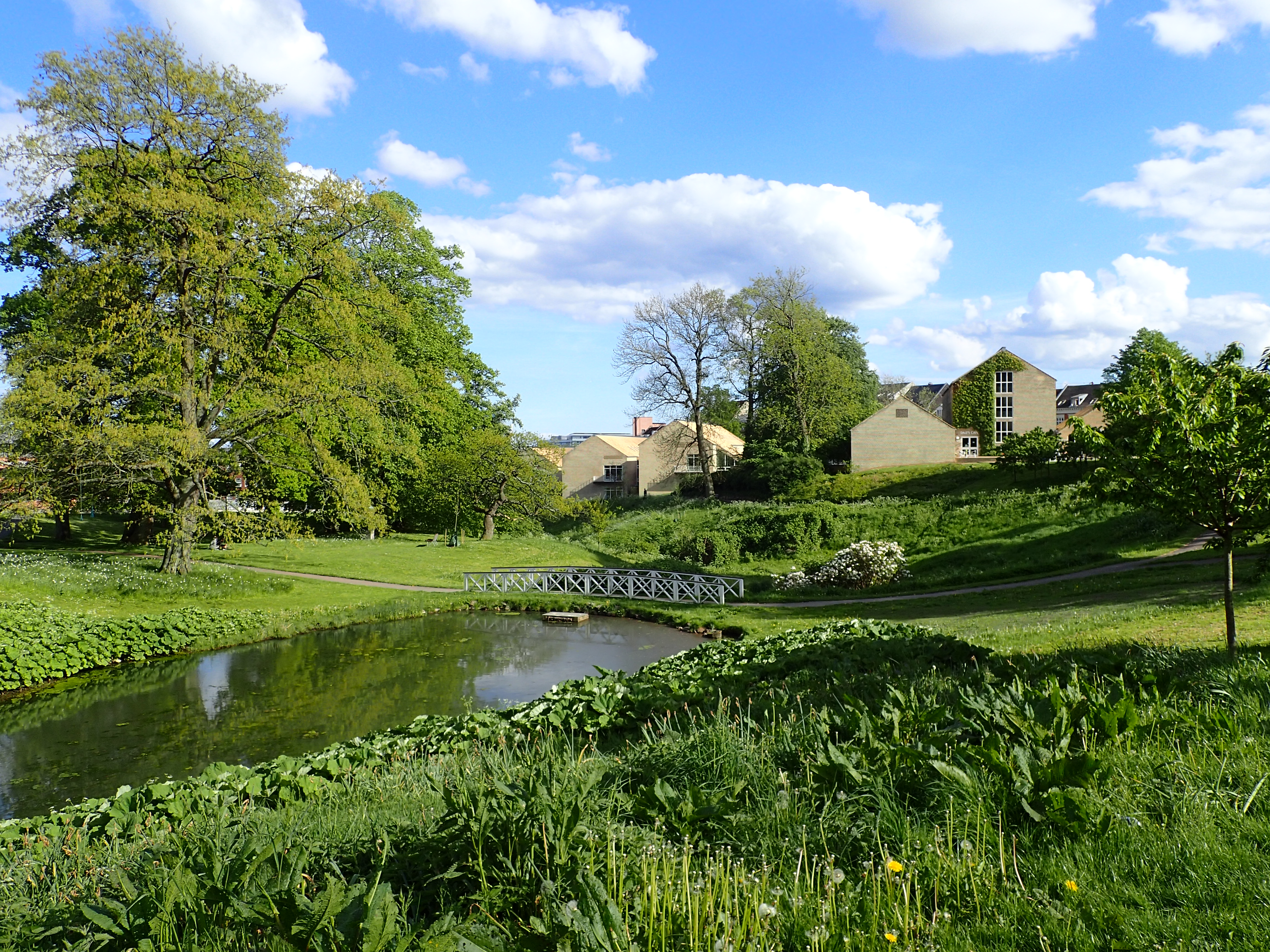

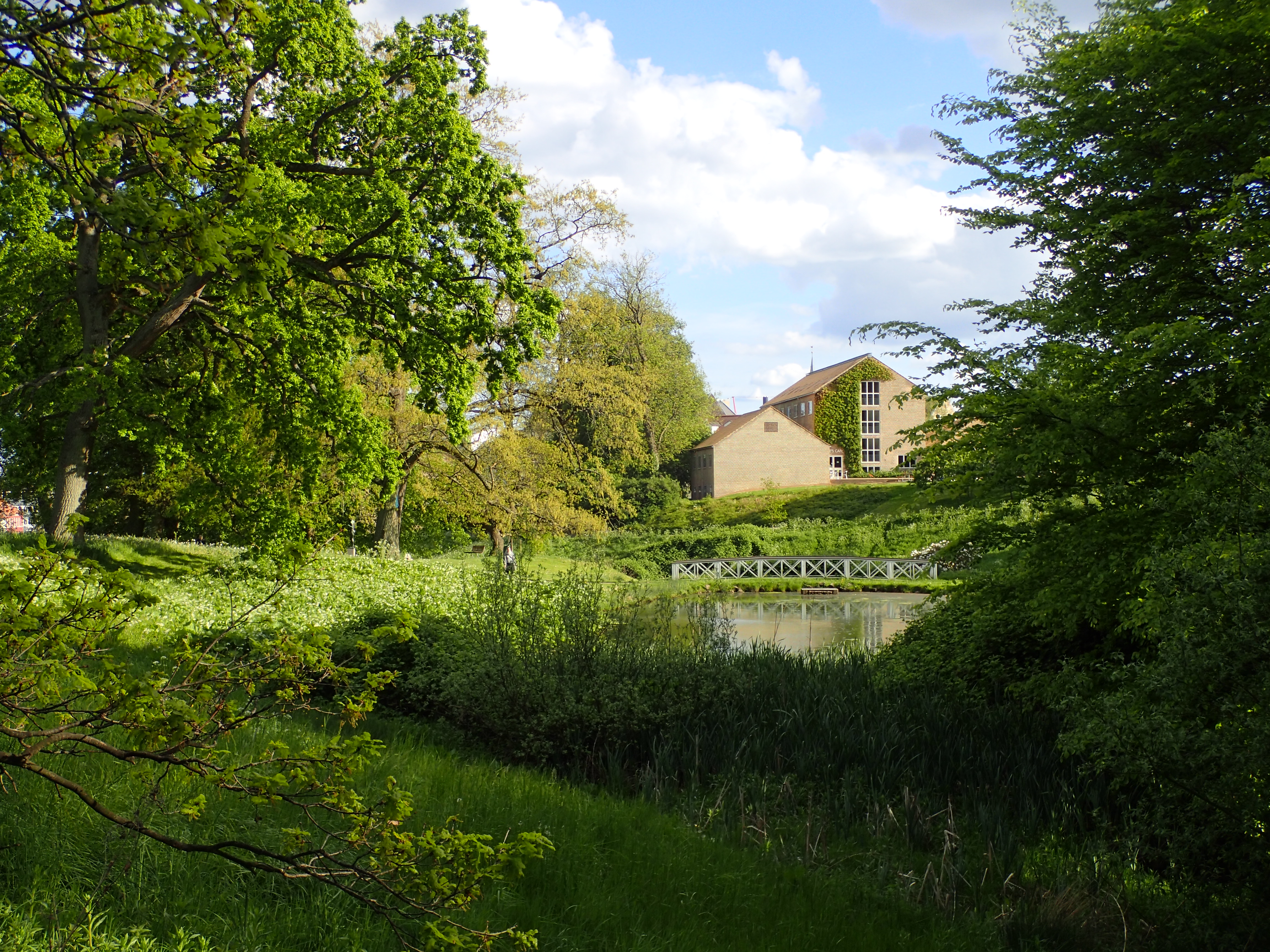

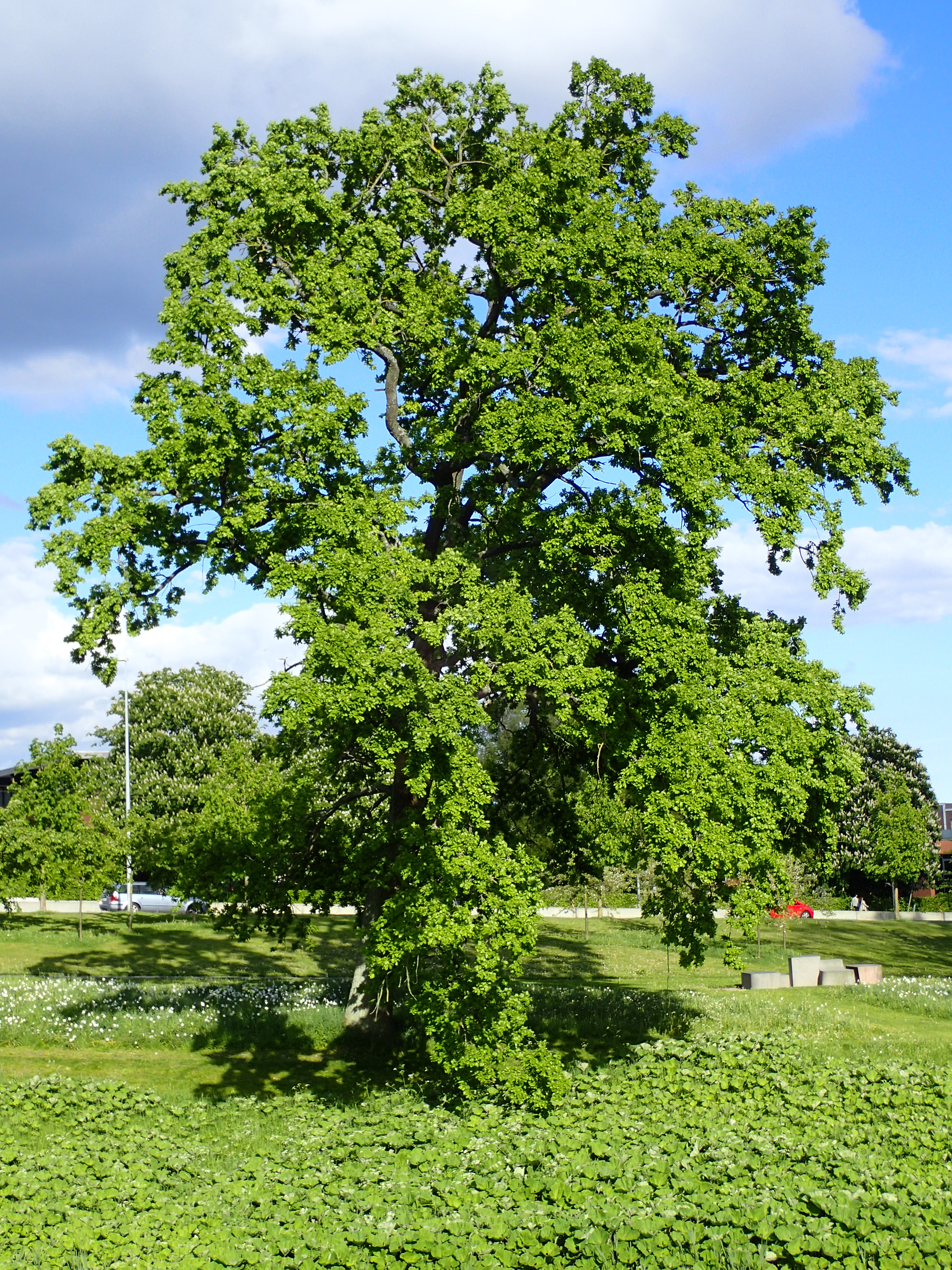

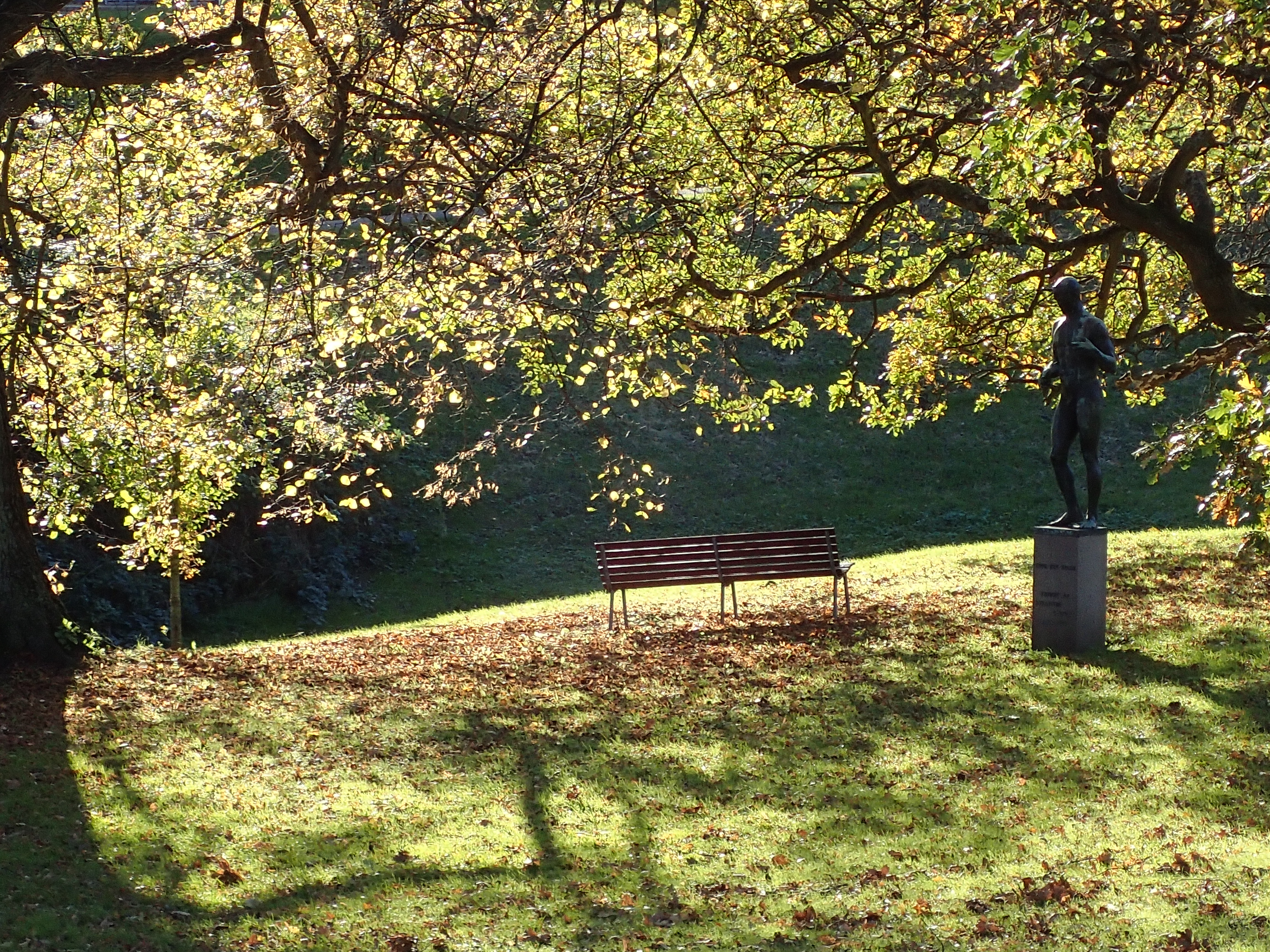

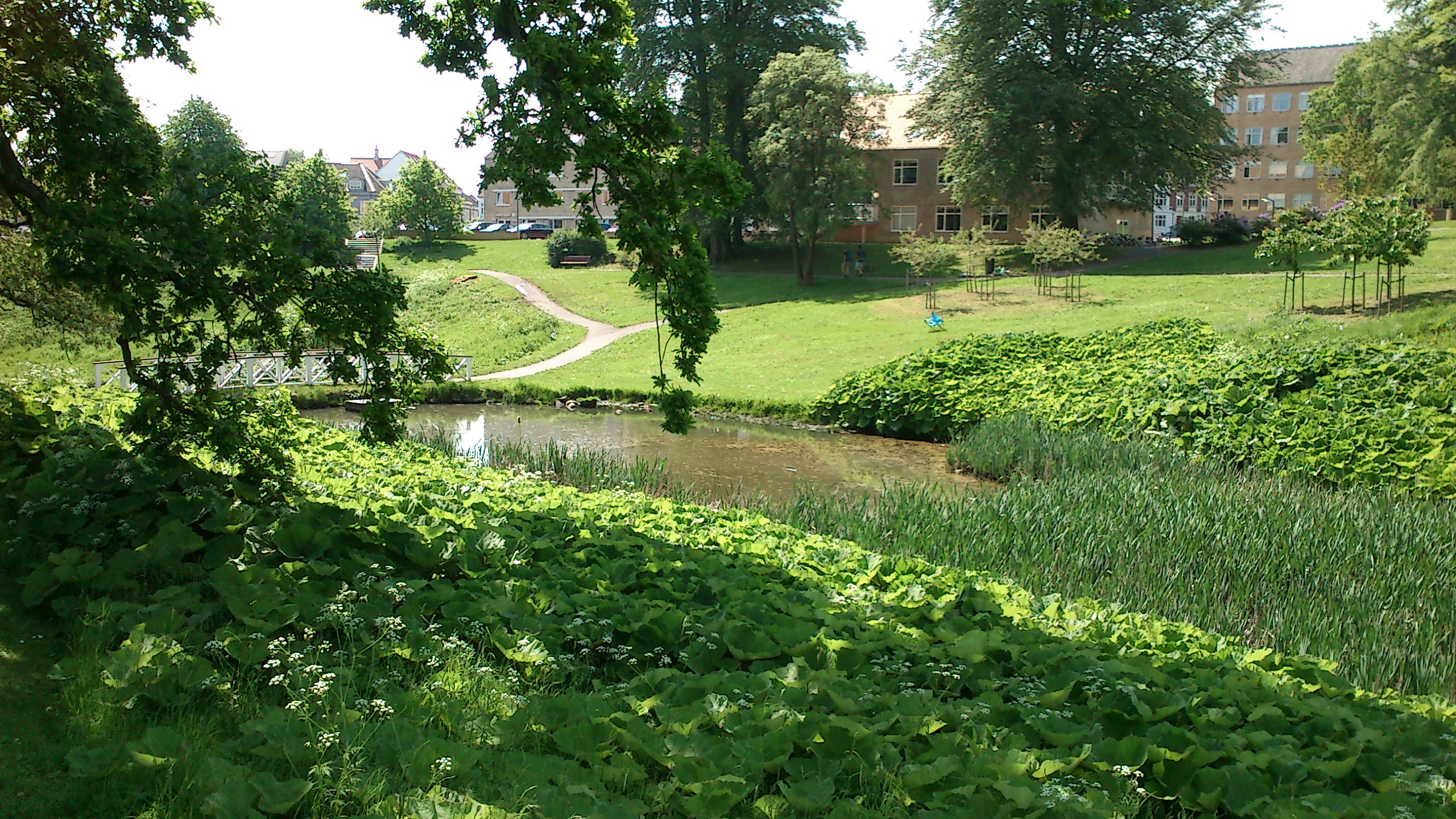

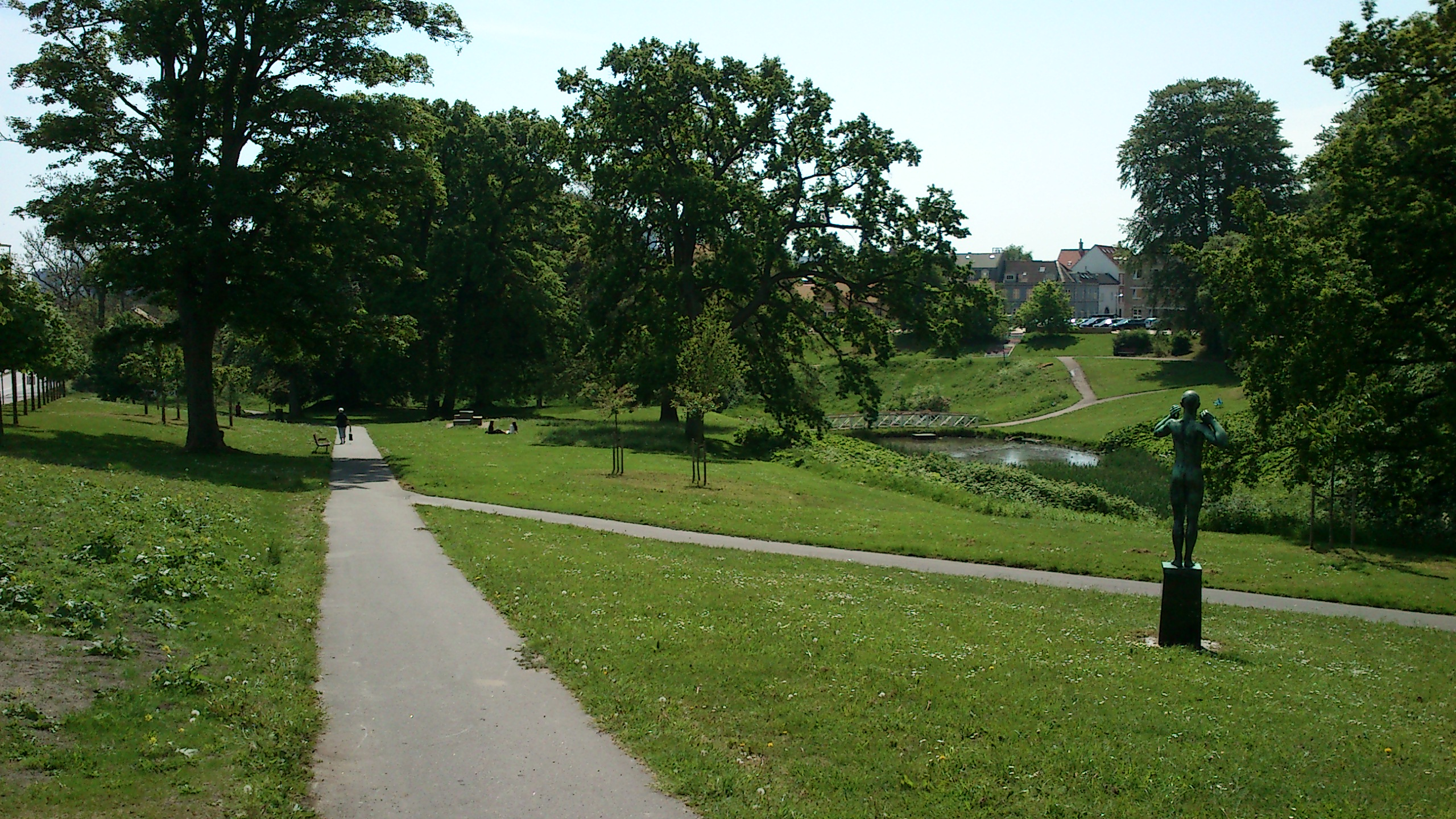

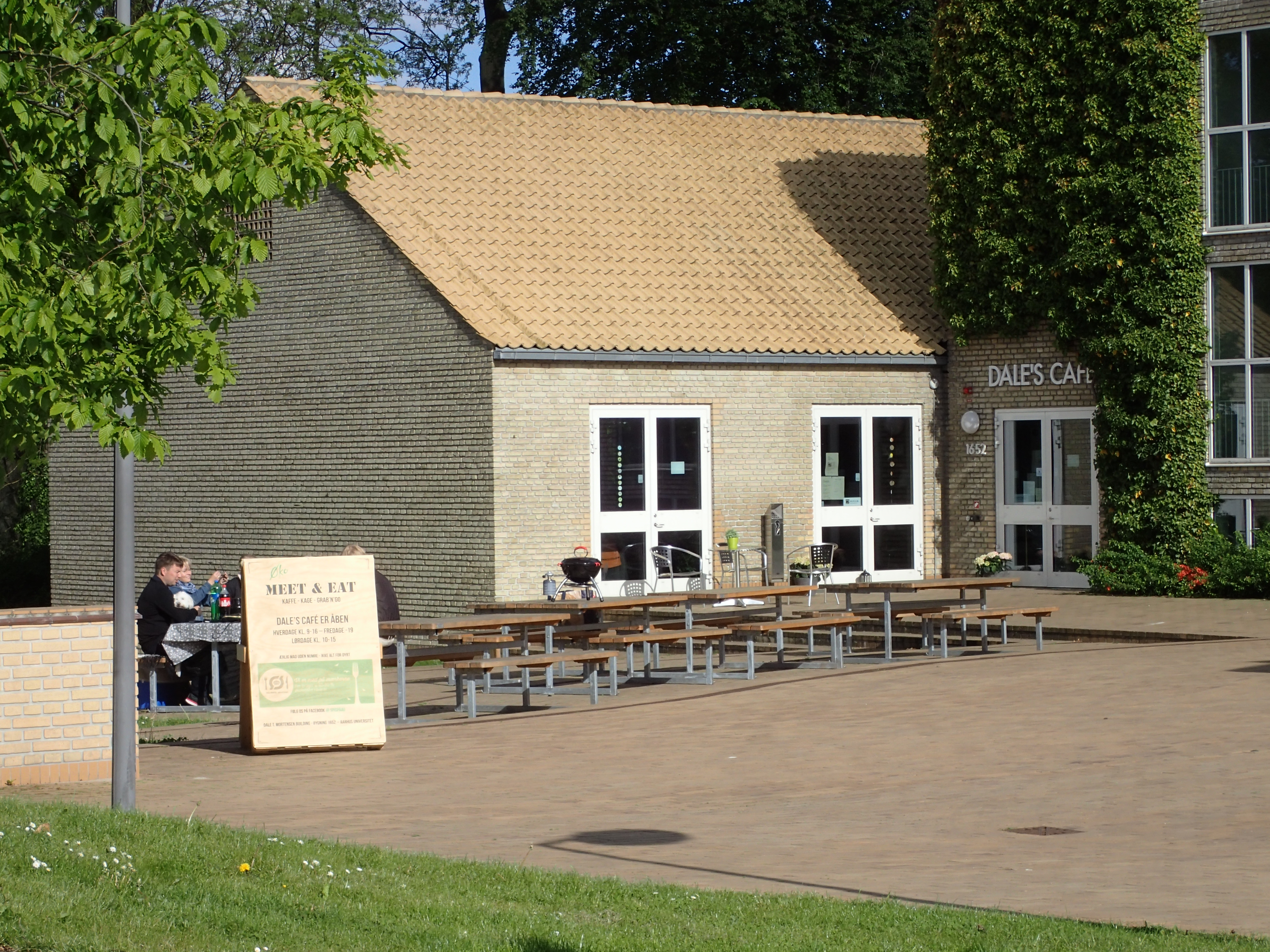

== See also ==
- Aarhus University Park
