= Parks College =

Parks College may refer to:

- Parks College, Oxford, a graduate college of the University of Oxford, established in 2019
- Parks College, one of multiple colleges combined to make Everest College
- Parks College Airline, a defunct airlines associated with Parks Air College
- Parks Air College, a former aviation and engineering college that merged into Saint Louis University
- Parks College of Engineering, Aviation and Technology, a department of Saint Louis University
