= University Town (Chashan) =

Area of Wenzhou, Zhejiang, China

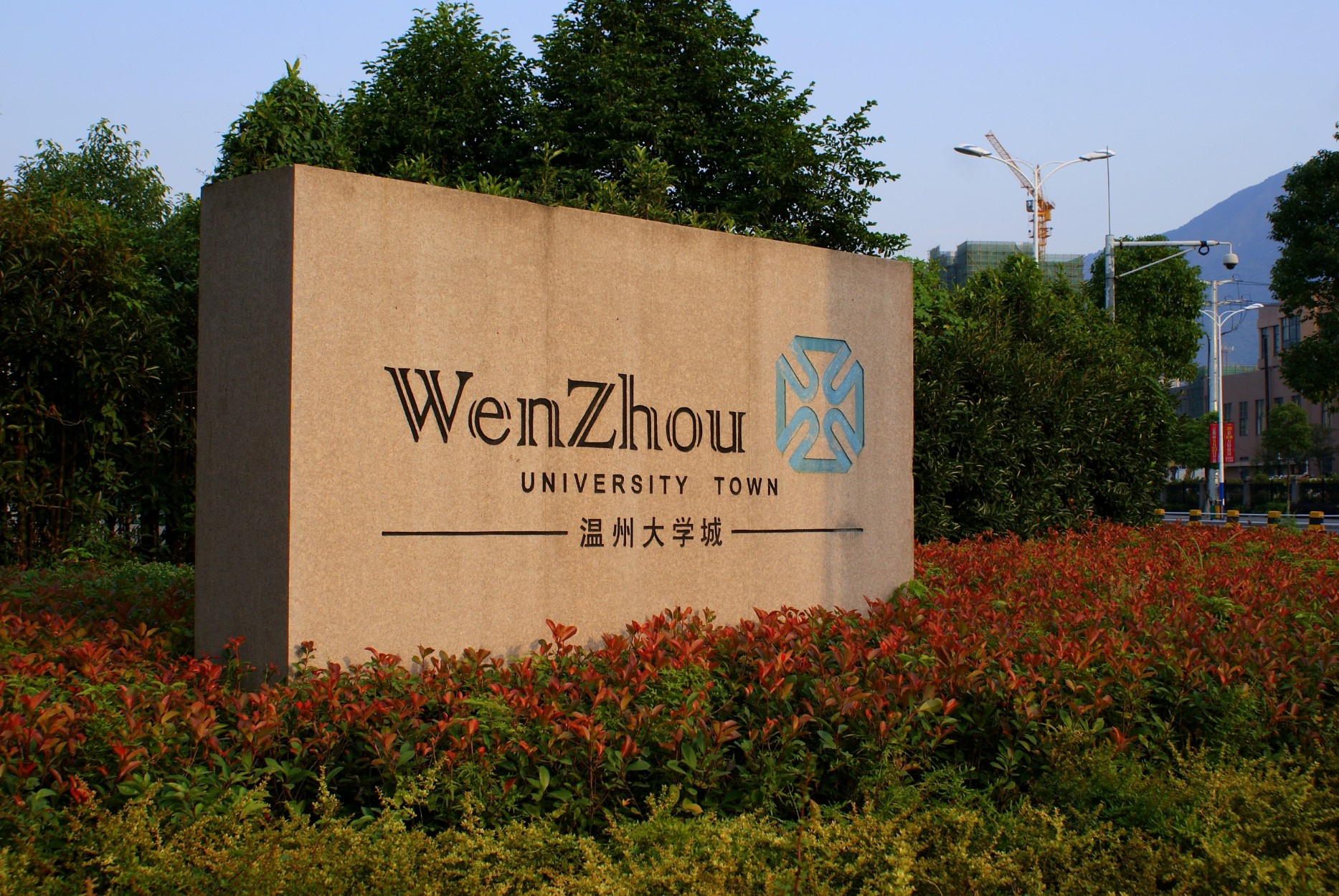
University town sign

The University Town (Chinese: 高教园区, Gao jiao yuan qu) lies at the foot of the Daluo hills (大罗山) in Chashan town, 20 km south east of Wenzhou City.

With the conceptual planning and preparation initiated in August 2000, the current university town spans an area of 8 square kilometres, and has grown to accommodate a total student population of 55,725; the majority of these are undergraduate students, with the rest consisting of 3,073 Graduate students and 519 International students.

It serves as the home of the main campuses for three teaching institutions (and their respective constituent schools):

- Wenzhou Medical College
- Wenzhou University
- Wenzhou Technical College

Entertainment Business Center lies in the University Town (Chinese: 高教园区), Gao jiao yuan qu. In Business Center, there are many snacks and restaurants like Lan Tian Snack Restaurant (Chinese: 蓝天点心店) and Dream Tasty Restaurant (Chinese: 梦味馆). Bars, supermarket, cinema and other entertainment along with Industrial and Commercial Bank of China make up of a busy town.

University Town Markers

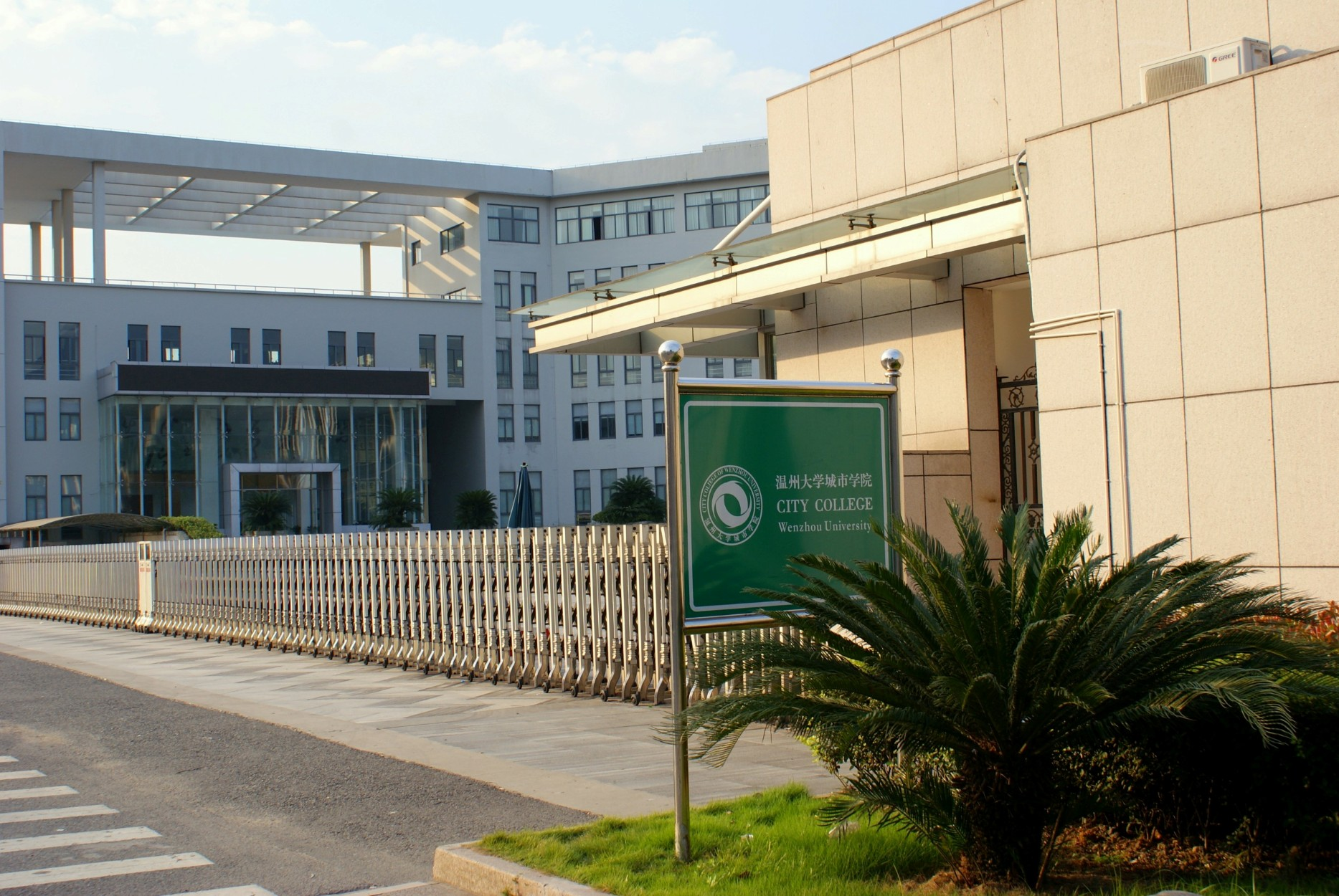
"City College" Gate

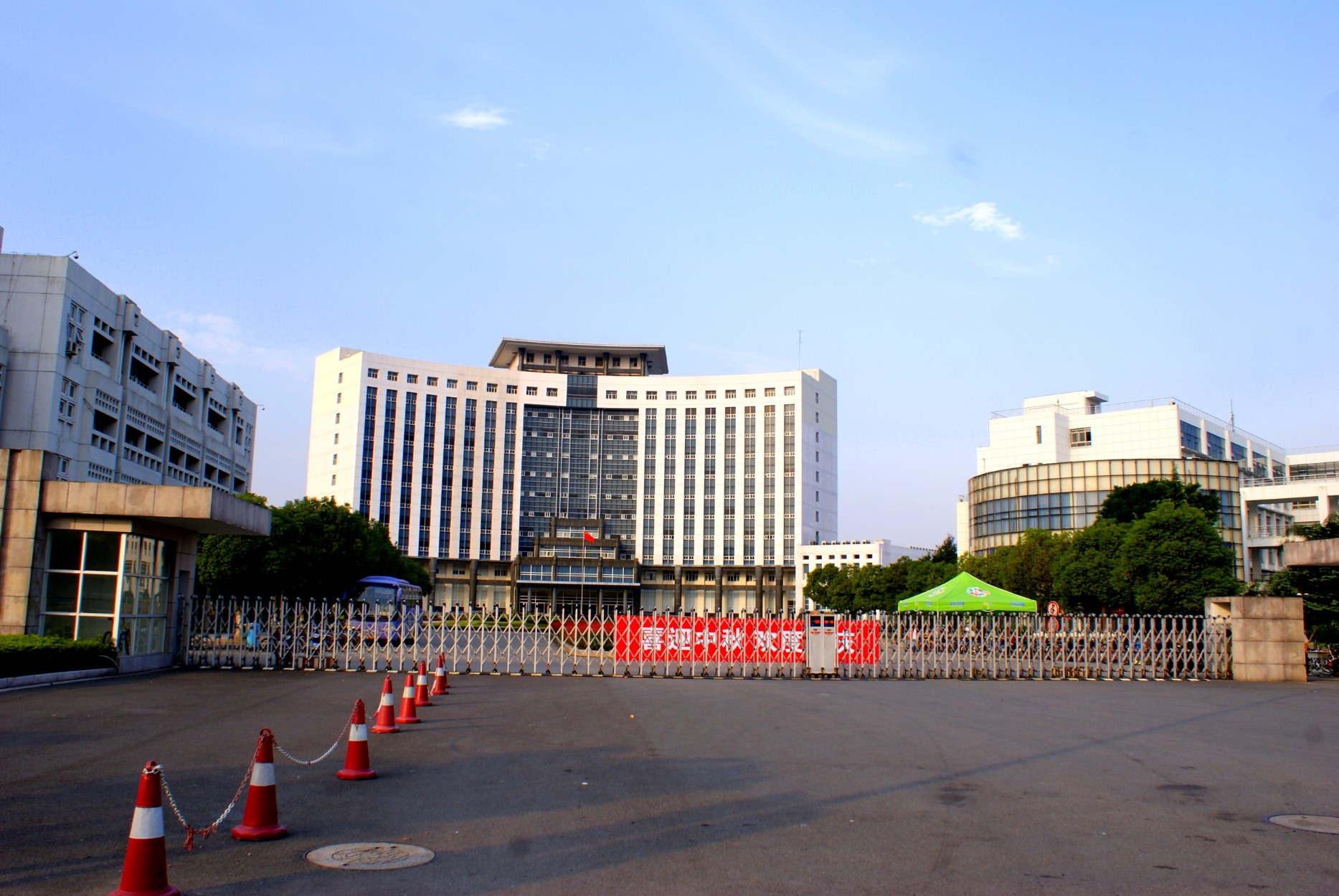
"Administration Building" Gate

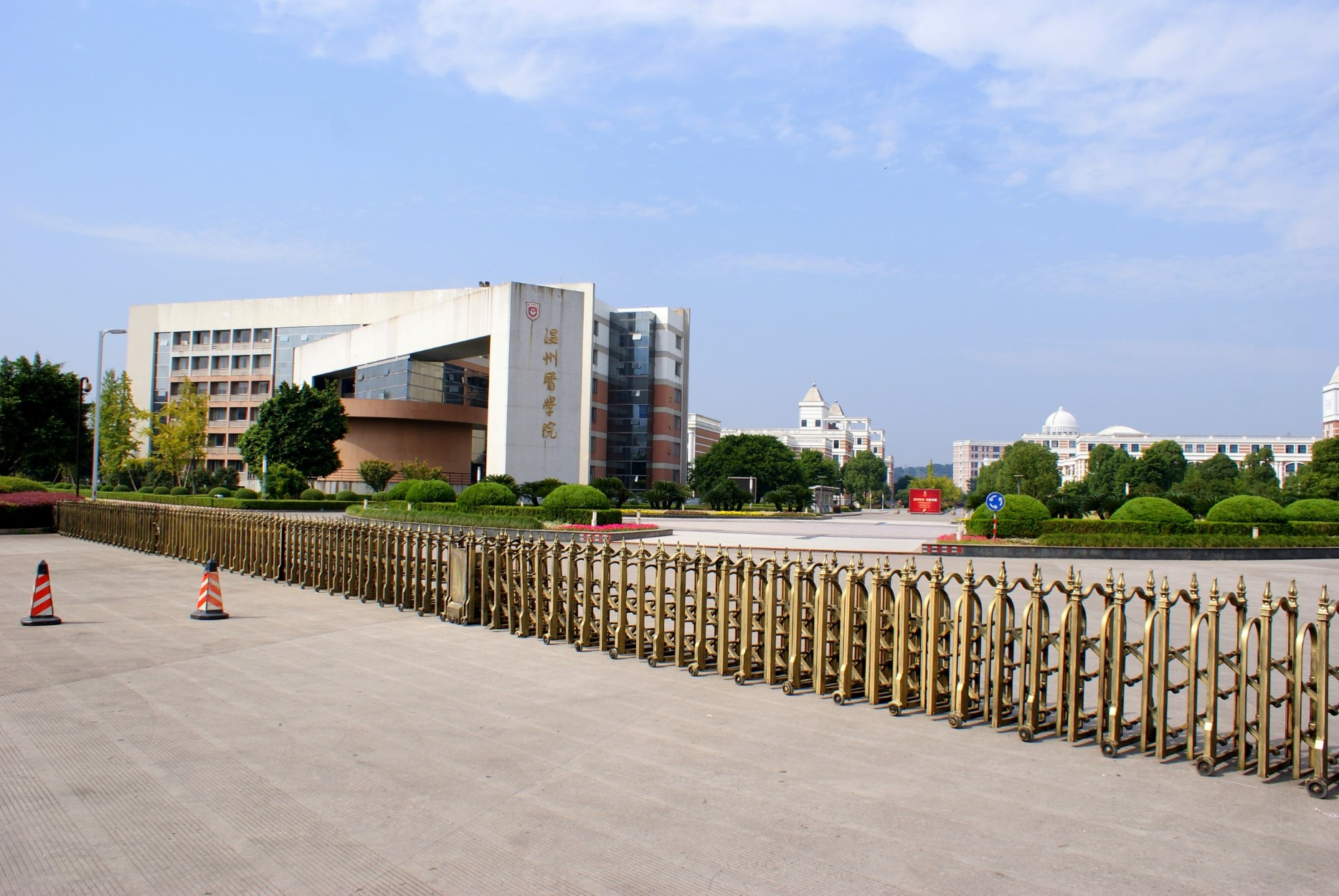
WMC Gate

It is a rapidly developing sub-urban area bordered by farms, some of which specialize in growing two of Wenzhou's specialties: Chinese Bayberry (杨梅, Yangmei) and the Wenzhou Oranges (温州蜜柑, Wēnzhōu Mìgān & 欧柑, ōugān - Citrus suavissima Hort. ex Tanaka).
