= Wenzhou University =

Public university in Wenzhou, Zhejiang, China

- 温州大学
- Former name: Wenzhou Normal College
- Type: Public university
- Established: 1984
- President: Zheng Xiaoqun
- Faculty: 1,310
- Administrative staff: 1,950
- Students: 24,960
- Location: Wenzhou, Zhejiang, China
- Campus: Urban area
- Colours
- Website: wzu.edu.cn

Chinese name
- Simplified Chinese: 温州大学
- Traditional Chinese: 溫州大學
Transcriptions
Standard Mandarin
- Hanyu Pinyin: Wēnzhōu Dàxué

Wenzhou University (WZU) is a municipal public university in Wenzhou, Zhejiang, China. It is owned by the Wenzhou Municipal People's Government.

== History ==
Wenzhou University was founded through the amalgamation of Wenzhou Normal College established in 1956 and the former Wenzhou University, which was established in 1984.

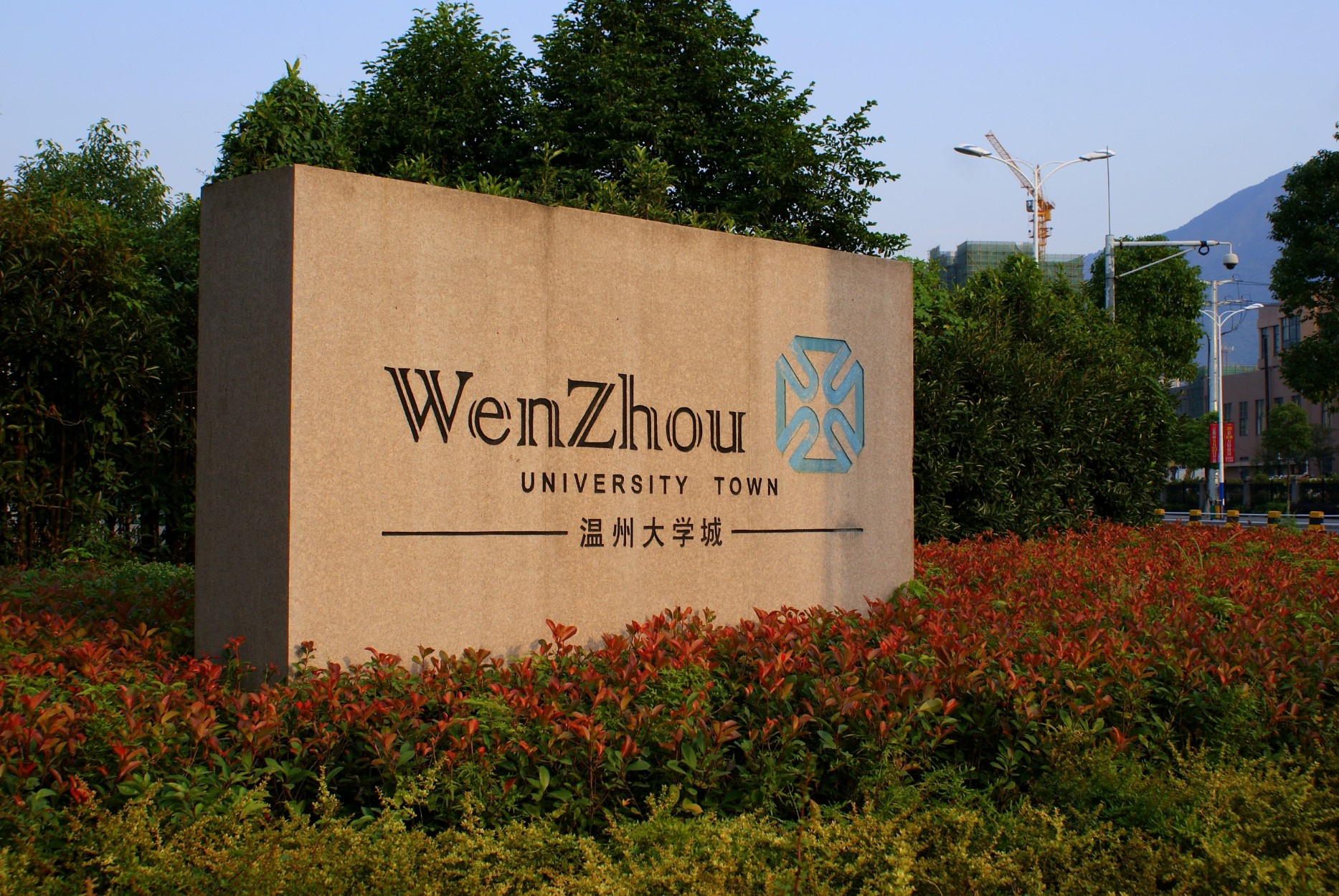
University town sign

== Campuses ==
The two main campuses of the university are in Wenzhou's Chashan University Town, an area surrounded by green mountains and rivers.

WZU has with a total area of 1.7 square kilometers (420 acres), and the housing area is 820,000 square meters. The library has a collection of approximately 1.59 million volumes.

== Administration ==
=== Faculty ===
The number of faculty members, administrative and supporting staff is 1,950, which 1,310 are full-time teachers (including 167 professors, 448 associate professors), 181 are mentors for postgraduates and doctorate students, and 201 are academics.

=== Students ===
The university has a full-time student population of 24,960.

=== Schools and departments ===
There are 20 departments or colleges at the university:

- School of Business
- College of Law and Politics
- College of Physical Education
- College of Humanity
- College of Foreign Languages
- College of Teacher Education
- College of Music
- Institute of Art and Design
- College of Mathematics and Information Science
- College of Physics and Electric Information
- College of Chemistry and Materials Science
- College of Life and Environmental Science
- College of Mechanical and Electrical Engineering
- College of Computer Science and Engineering
- College of Architecture and Civil Engineering
- Fashion Institute
- College of Adult and Further Education
- Ou Jiang College
- College of International Cooperation
- City College
