= College City =

College City may refer to:

- College City, Arkansas
- College City, California
