= University Park, Aarhus =

Park in Aarhus, Denmark

Coordinates: 56.168°N 10.203°E

Universitetsparken
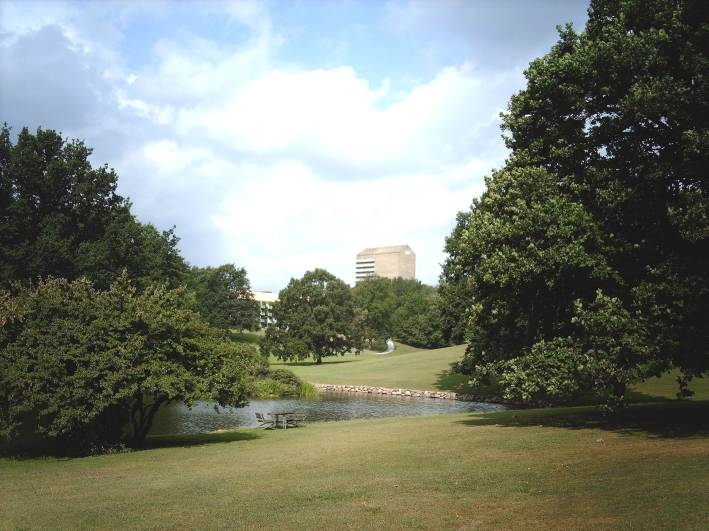
- Aarhus University Park
- Interactive map of Universitetsparken
- Type: Urban park
- Location: Aarhus, Denmark
- Area: 15 hectares (37 acres)
- Created: 1933
- Owner: Aarhus University

Aarhus University Park or the University Park (Danish: Universitetsparken) is a public park in central Aarhus, Denmark. The University Park is at the centre of Aarhus University's main campus.

As the university campus, the University Park is situated in the neighbourhood of Vesterbro in Midtbyen close to Trøjborg, and the park bounded by the streets of Nørrebrogade, Nordre Ringgade, Langelandsgade, Kaserneboulevarden and Høegh Guldbergs Gade. The park forms part of the Aarhus University campus and figures in the Danish Culture Canon for its landscape design. The combined park and campus has received international recognition for its aesthetic values, and the University Park has been protected by law since 1993, in order to conserve its unique design.

The University Park was established in 1933 in conjunction with the university. The campus master plan competition was won in 1931 by the collaborative scheme of Danish architects Kay Fisker, C. F. Møller and Povl Stegmann in collaboration with landscape architect Carl Theodor Sørensen who designed the park.

The park is encircled by the university buildings, including the Natural History Museum and dormitories. It is constructed across an undulating landscape in parts of an old moraine valley stretching from Katrinebjerg in Vejlby, in the north, to the Bay of Aarhus in the east. The park is characterized by its oak trees, two artificial lakes, home to water fowl and amphibians, and large open, grassy areas. A small stream runs north-south in the bottom of the valley from the amphitheatre to the lakes. The adjoining Vennelystparken to the south, contrasts the University Park with a different terrain and fauna and mixed tree growth.

In 1949, an amphitheatre was added below the main building of the university and it has become a central element in recreational activities in the park. Annually a boat race is held in the lakes between the faculties of the university, which has become a public event.

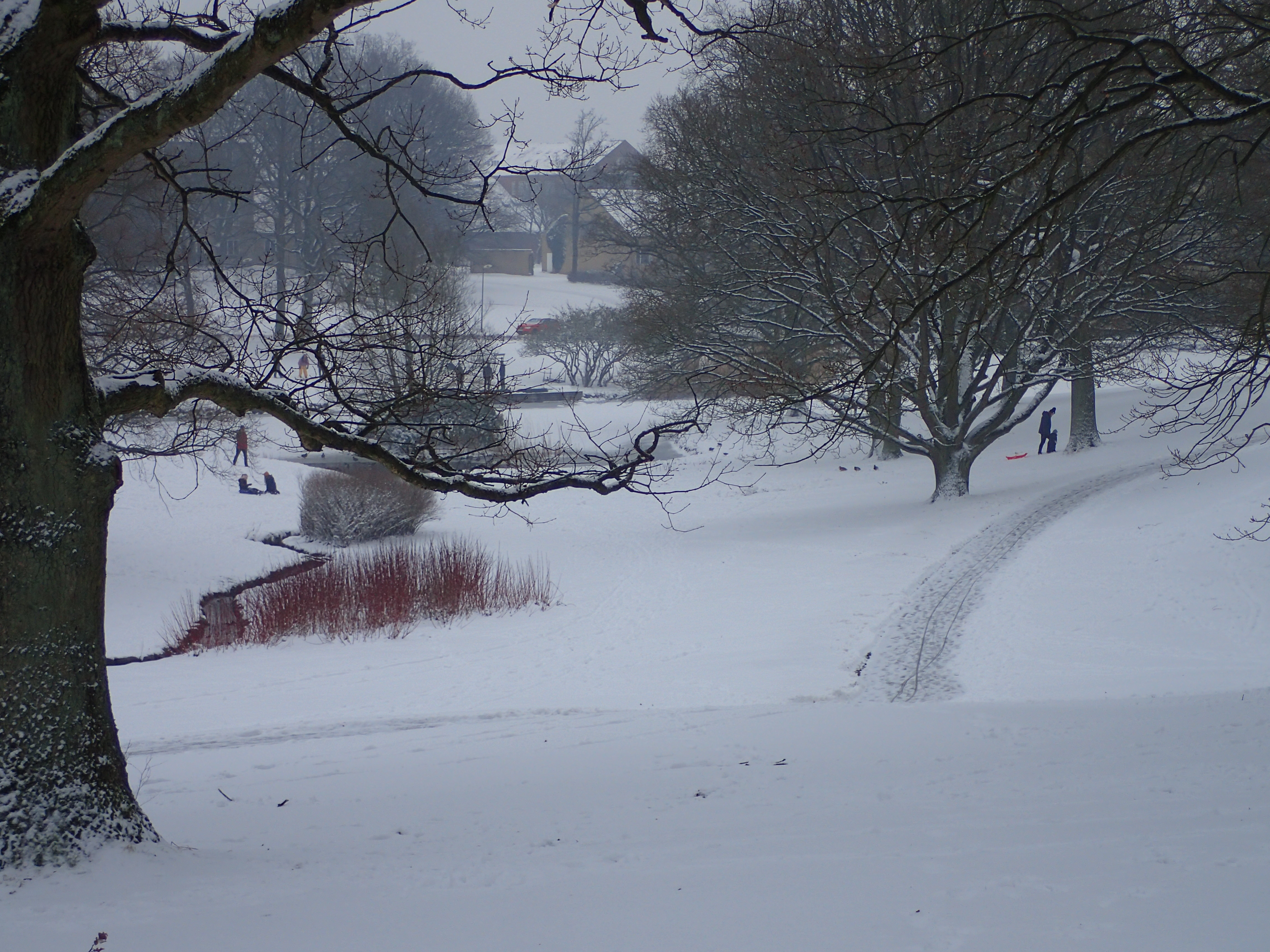

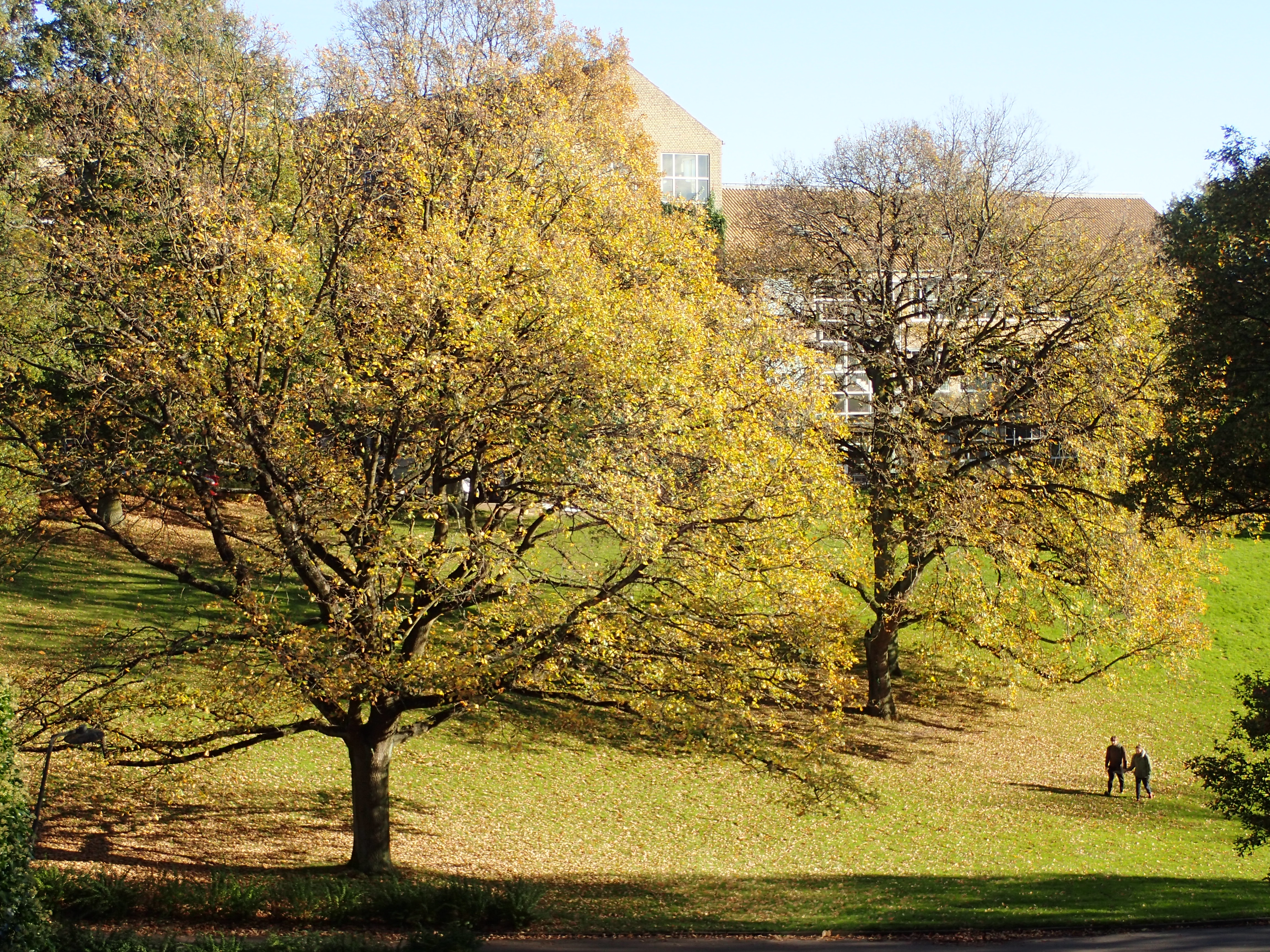

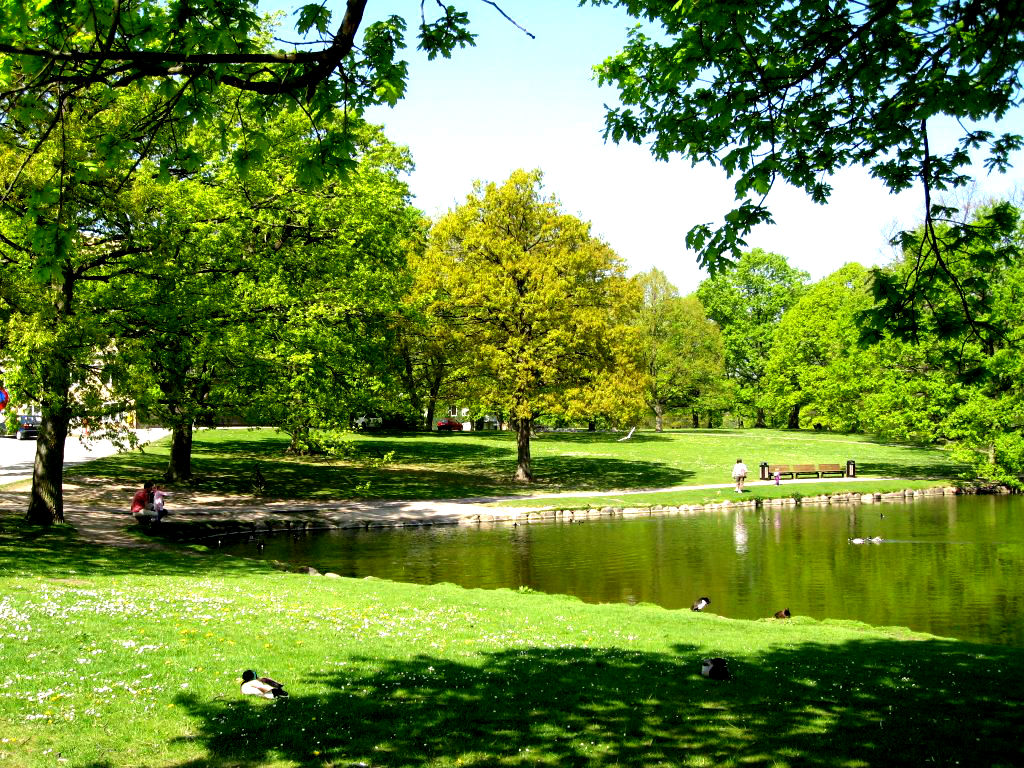

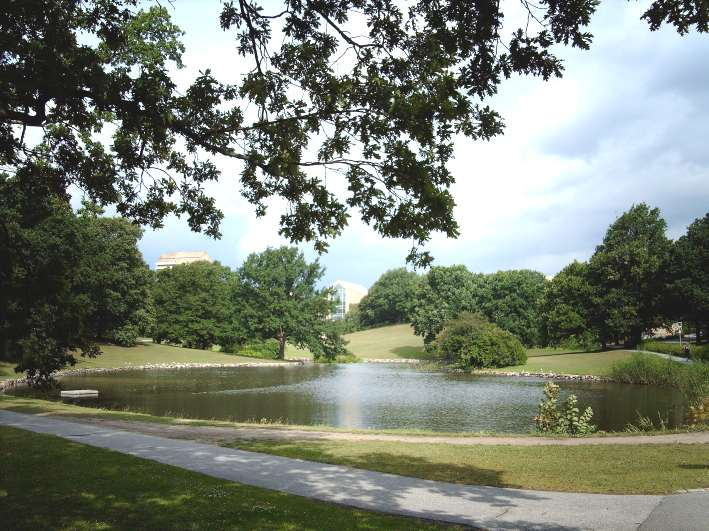

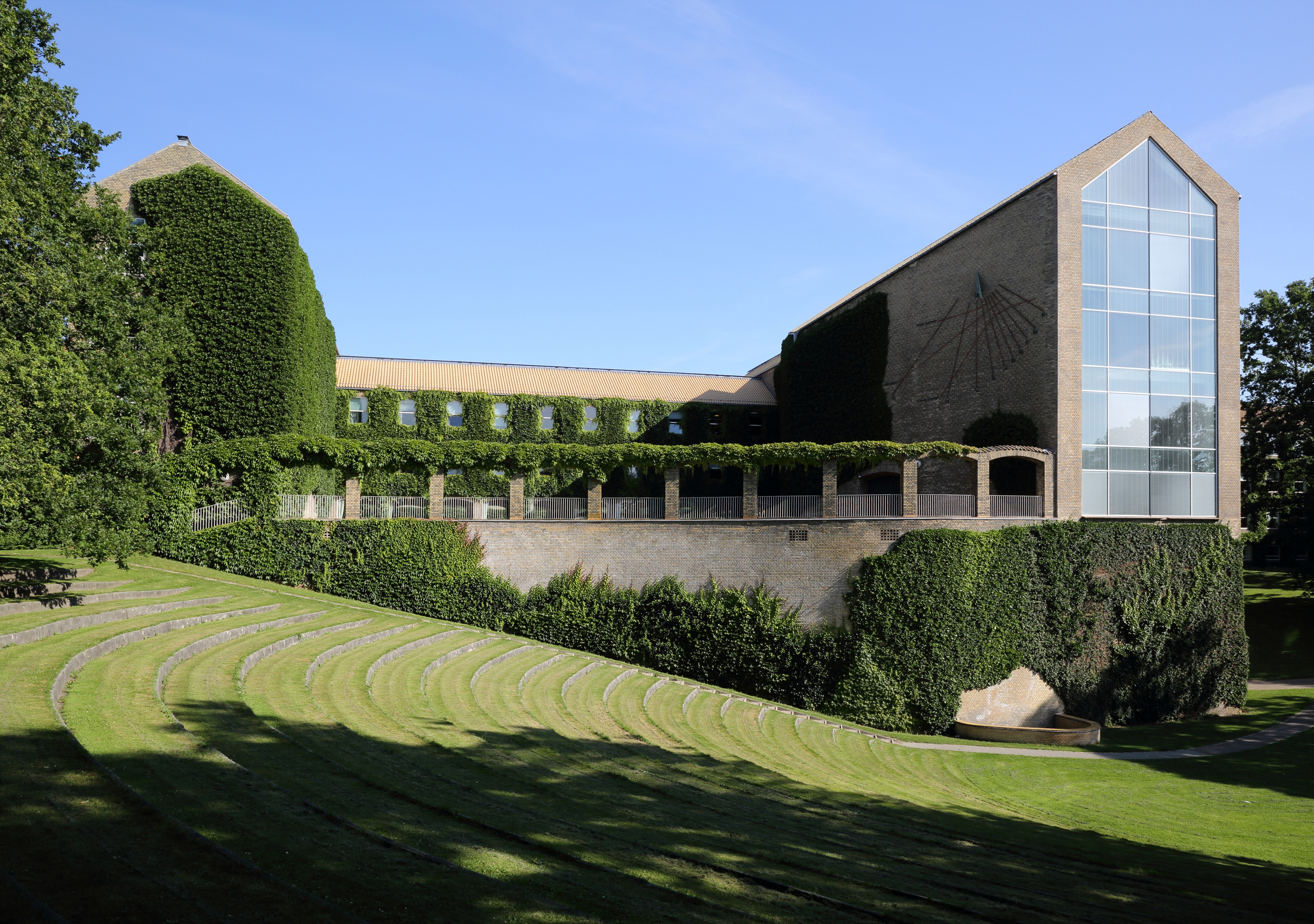
Main Building and amphiteathre

== See also ==
- Vennelystparken
