= Rudolf Frimodt Clausen =

Danish architect

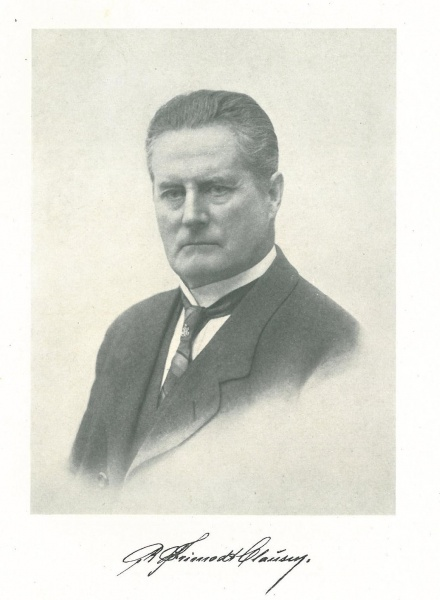
- Born: 29 June 1861; Copenhagen, Denmark
- Died: 7 April 1950 (aged 88); Aarhus, Denmark
- Occupation: Architect

Rudolf Frimodt Clausen was a Danish architect born in Copenhagen on 29 June 1861 to the bishop Johannes Clausen and grandson of the theologian Henrik Nicolai Clausen.

Between 1886 and 1888 Frimodt Clausen worked as conductor for Vilhelm Theodor Walther. Later Frimodt Clausen worked a great deal in Aarhus as an architect. In 1891 he became architect for Aarhus Oliefabrik where he continued to work for the rest of his life. He designed the Ceres Brewery, the buildings in Guldsmedgade 1, 3, 5, 7 and 9, Store Torv 7 and the corner buildings on St. Paul's Church Square.

In Frimodt Clausen's work can be seen inspiration from Anton Rosen in the early 1900s. Like other architects during this period he made buildings in both the National Romantic and Neoclassical style. He followed the architectural developments as can be seen in P.P. Ørumsgade where a city block was constructed in 1933-35 after designs by Frimodt Clausen in a Functionalist style.

Frimodt Clausen died on 7 March 1950 in Aarhus.

== Works ==
- Councillor Andersen's Foundation, Odder (1890)
- Christian IX's asylum, St. Poulsgade Århus (1891)
- Additions and renovations for Aarhus Oliefabrik (1891-1950)
- Bike factory Dania, Trøjborgvej, Aarhus (1896)
- Otto Mønsted's Margarine factory, Vestergade (1896-1910)
- Additions and renovations for the Ceres Brewery (1899-1930)
- St. Clemens Pharmacy, Studsgade 40, Aarhus (1900)
- St. Paul's Pharmacy, Jægergårdsvej 76, Aarhus (1900)
- Skade Rectory (1904)
- Marselisborg Boarding School (1904)
- Office and factory buildings for FDB, Aarhus (1905–07)
- Surgical department, Århus County Hospital (1906–08)
- Herning Hede- og Disconto Bank (1911)
- Medicinal Department, Århus Municipal Hospital (1911–20)
- Aarhus Oliefabrik, Port of Aarhus (1916–30)
- Grenå Hospital (1920–22)
- Silkeborg Court and Jail (1921–22)
- Jyllandsposten's Office and printing press building, Aarhus (1923–24)
- Addition and renovation, Silkeborg Hospital (1922–26)
- Skanderborg Hospital (1927–29)
- Ålborg County Hospital (1928–30)
- Building for De grønne pigespejdere, Aarhus (1928)
- Brobjerghus, Frederiksgade (1900)

== External references ==
- Rudolf Frimodt Clausen on Wikimedia commons
