= Laurits Christian Meulengracht =

Danish businessman (1837–1903)

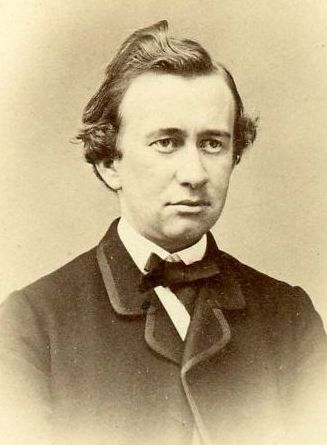
- Laurits Christian Meulengracht c. 1890
- Born: 14 February 1837; Aarhus, Denmark
- Died: 9 May 1903 (aged 66); Monte Carlo, Monaco

Laurits Christian Meulengracht or Laurits Christopher Meulengracht (14 February 1837 – 9 April 1903) was a Danish businessman and brewer who became one of the wealthiest men in Denmark in the 19th century. He received the Order of the Dannebrog and Knight of the Dannebrog.

His father, Lars Christian Meulengracht, died six months before he was born so he grew up in his grandfather Harboe Meulengracht's house. At 15 years old he started an internship in the store of Malthe Conrad Lottrup, a local businessman who among other things owned a sizable brewery. In 1858 he was sent to Copenhagen to study trade further and in 1862 started a successful business in London. However, by 1870 his former mentor Lottrup had fallen ill and called Meulengracht home to take over management of Lottrup's Ceres Brewery.

Meulengracht took over the brewery and managed it during the course of his life. Initially he rationalized and bought new technology in the form of a steam engine. From 1872 to 1888, a large expansion program was undertaken which eventually made Ceres the largest brewery in Jutland and Meulengracht one of the wealthiest people in Aarhus. Tax records show he paid more in taxes than even contemporaries Otto Mønsted and Hans Broge. Meulengracht eventually moved into a new home on the Ceres complex which eventually became a social focal point for the local upper class. As an employer he was known for his ability to make opposing groups work together and privately Meulengracht was active in charity and advocacy work. In 1876 he was elected to the city council and held his seat for 14 years, working in numerous committees particularly on public works and infrastructure. Meulengracht was also one of the forces behind the establishment of Aarhus Theatre and he sat on the first board after it was opened.

Meulengracht died 9 April 1903 after a lengthy illness and during a healing trip to Monte Carlo. He was buried in Nordre Cemetery in Aarhus.

== Honors ==
Meulengracht had the official honorary title of etatsråd and he received the Order of the Dannebrog and Knight of the Dannebrog.
