= Meulengracht =

Meulengracht is a surname. Notable people with the surname include:

- Hans Meulengracht-Madsen, Danish sailor
- Harboe Meulengracht
- Laurits Christian Meulengracht (1837–1903), Danish businessman
