= Vestre Kirkegård =

Vestre Kirkegård may refer to:

- Vestre Cemetery (Aarhus), Denmark
- Vestre Cemetery (Copenhagen), Denmark

== See also ==
- Vestre gravlund, Oslo, Norway
