= Korn- og Foderstof Kompagniet =

Danish company

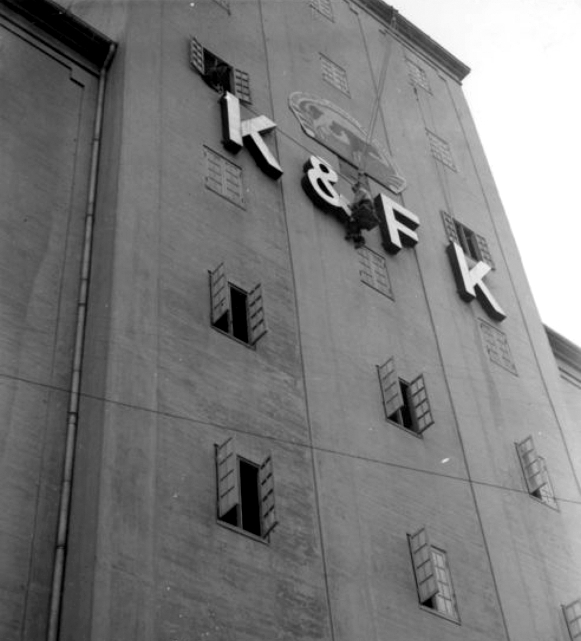
- KfK warehouse in Aarhus
- Founded: 1896
- Headquarters: Aarhus

Korn- og Foderstof Kompagniet (KfK) was a Danish company in the feed-stuffs industry. Founded in Aarhus in 1896 by 12 merchants it grew through the early 20th century to become one of the largest Danish businesses trading in feed-stuffs and grain with branches in many Danish cities. It became one of the largest employers in Aarhus until the 2000s when the grain business was bought by a number of competitors, led by Dansk Landbrugs Grovvareselskab, and renamed Treka. The remainder of KfK was reformed into the company Biomar A/S, focused mainly on fish feed.

== History ==
In the early 1900s the grain trade changed dramatically as industrialization changed infrastructure and the scale of factories. Developments tended towards larger companies, increased competition and less personal relations between merchants and farmers. On this background 12 merchants in eastern Jutland merged their businesses to form Korn- og Foderstof Kompagniet (English: The Grain- and Feed-stuff Company) or KfK on 2 June 1896. The goal was the advantages of larger scale and limiting competition in the region in order to focus on expansion to other markets. The founding members were some of the wealthiest and prominent businessmen in the region and counted among them Hans Broge, Otto Mønsted and Harboe Meulengracht from Aarhus and Johan Ankerstjerne from Randers.

The silo complex in the Port of Aarhus was heavily damaged during the Second World War when a German ammunition barge exploded on 4 July 1944. The complex had to be rebuilt almost from scratch but that also meant the branch in Aarhus entered to post-war years with modern facilities. The complex was heavily expanded around 1960 with new large silos but since the company stopped in 2002 many have been demolished to make room for new developments.

In the decades following the establishment the company grew to have branches across the country. In 1913 KfK went public and up to the 1970s it was dominated by many minor stockholders. Until 1968 individual branches acted as independent entities for their local areas while the main office in Aarhus coordinated imports of press cakes and the international business. In 1968 the administration was centralized and moved to a new office building in Viby J. The following years Norsk Hydro bought increasingly larger shares of stock which eventually grew to some 62,5%. In 2002 KfK was put up for sale and a consortium of 8 companies headed by Dansk Landbrugs Grovvareselskab (DLG) bought all activities related to agriculture.

The remaining business was renamed Treka A/S consisting of two separate companies; BioMar A/S, producing fish feed, and EcoNordic, producing biofuels in the form of wood pellets. EcoNordic was sold to Statoil in 2003 where it became the subsidiary Statoil EcoNordic and in 2005 Norsk Hydro sold its controlling share in Biomar to Schouw & Co. In 2012, Biomar had a revenue of 8.2 billion DKK and 1000 employees in production facilities in seven countries.
