= Stykgodspakhuset =

Coordinates: 56.1548°N 10.2132°E

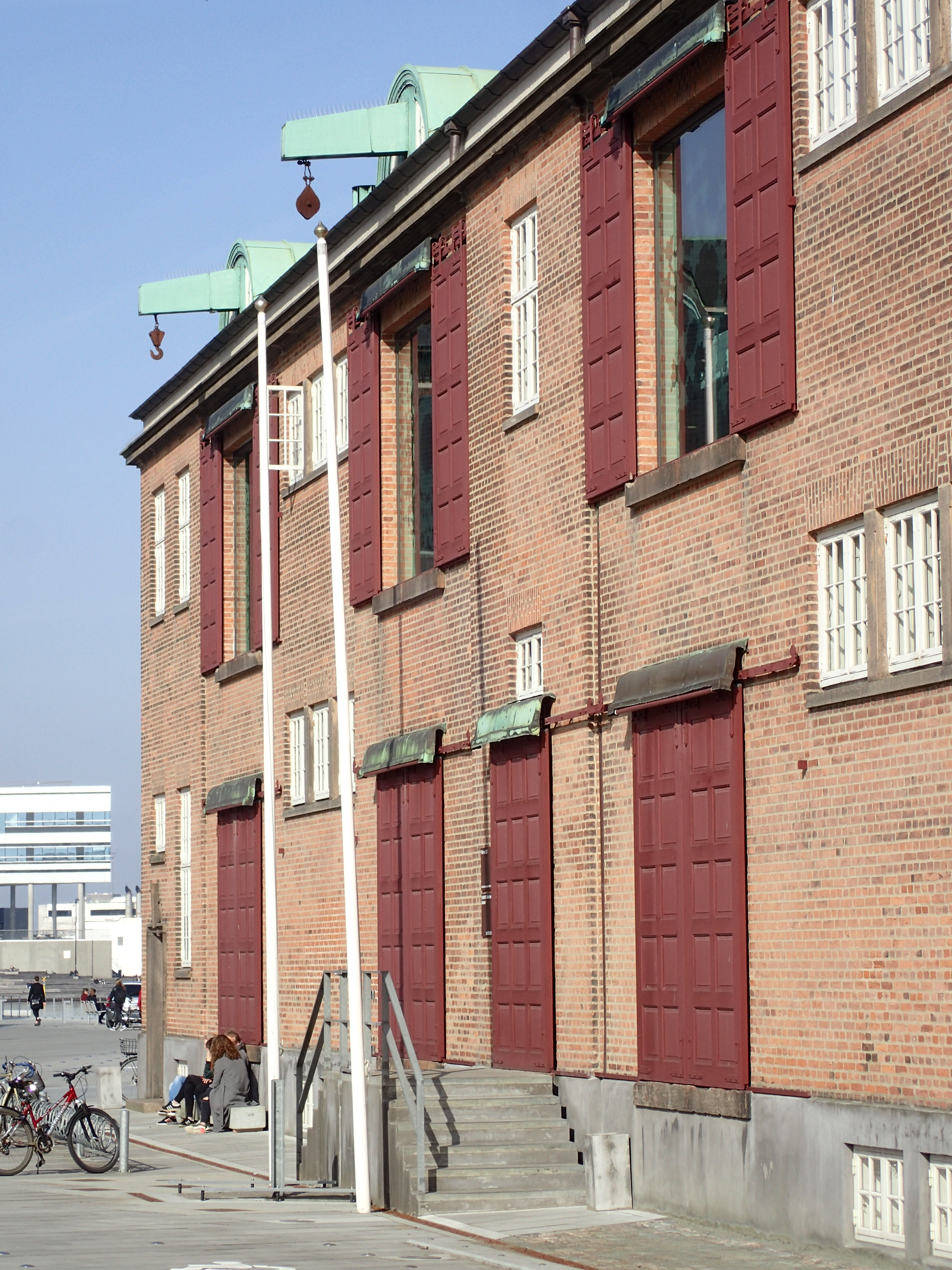
- Interactive map of the Stykgodspakhuset area

General information
- Architectural style: Neoclassical
- Location: Aarhus, Denmark
- Construction started: 1923
- Completed: 1926

Technical details
- Floor count: 2
- Floor area: 1,306 m^{2} (14,060 sq ft)

Design and construction
- Architect: Frederik Draiby

Stykgodspakhuset, or Pakhus 13, is a former warehouse and a listed building in Aarhus, Denmark. The warehouse was built in 1926 and was listed in the Danish national registry of protected buildings and places by the Danish Heritage Agency on 4 April 2006. The warehouse is situated on the water front of the Port of Aarhus in the central Indre by neighbourhood next to the Custom House and has functioned as a storehouse for parcels and other small cargo since completion to the mid 20th century. The building is today used for offices after extensive renovation in 2007.

The protected status was given due to the detailed work in an industrial structure. The Heritage Agency emphasizes the large gates and wall areas that give the building gravitas, offset by the small grid windows, gate covers and the copper roof. The interior features large mushroom columns typical of industrial architecture and they give the long store rooms a basilical appearance. The warehouse illustrates the importance of the Port of Aarhus as the largest provincial port in Denmark in the 20th century.

The building is 43 meters long in two stories and constructed of red bricks. The longer sides facing the harbor and Havnegade are not identical but are designed for a common purpose with large gates and grid windows. The doors are made of teak and painted red with intricate carvings and framed by granite blocks. The low hip roof is plated in verdigris green copper plates. The neoclassical architecture interacts with the characteristic national romantic Custom House building from 1898 situated next to it.

The warehouse was designed by the royal building inspector Frederik M. Draiby who also designed the Spanien Public Baths. It was slightly altered in 1963 with the addition of a gate in the north wall and a ramp. In 2007 it was renovated and turned into offices after it was listed as a protected building.

== Gallery ==
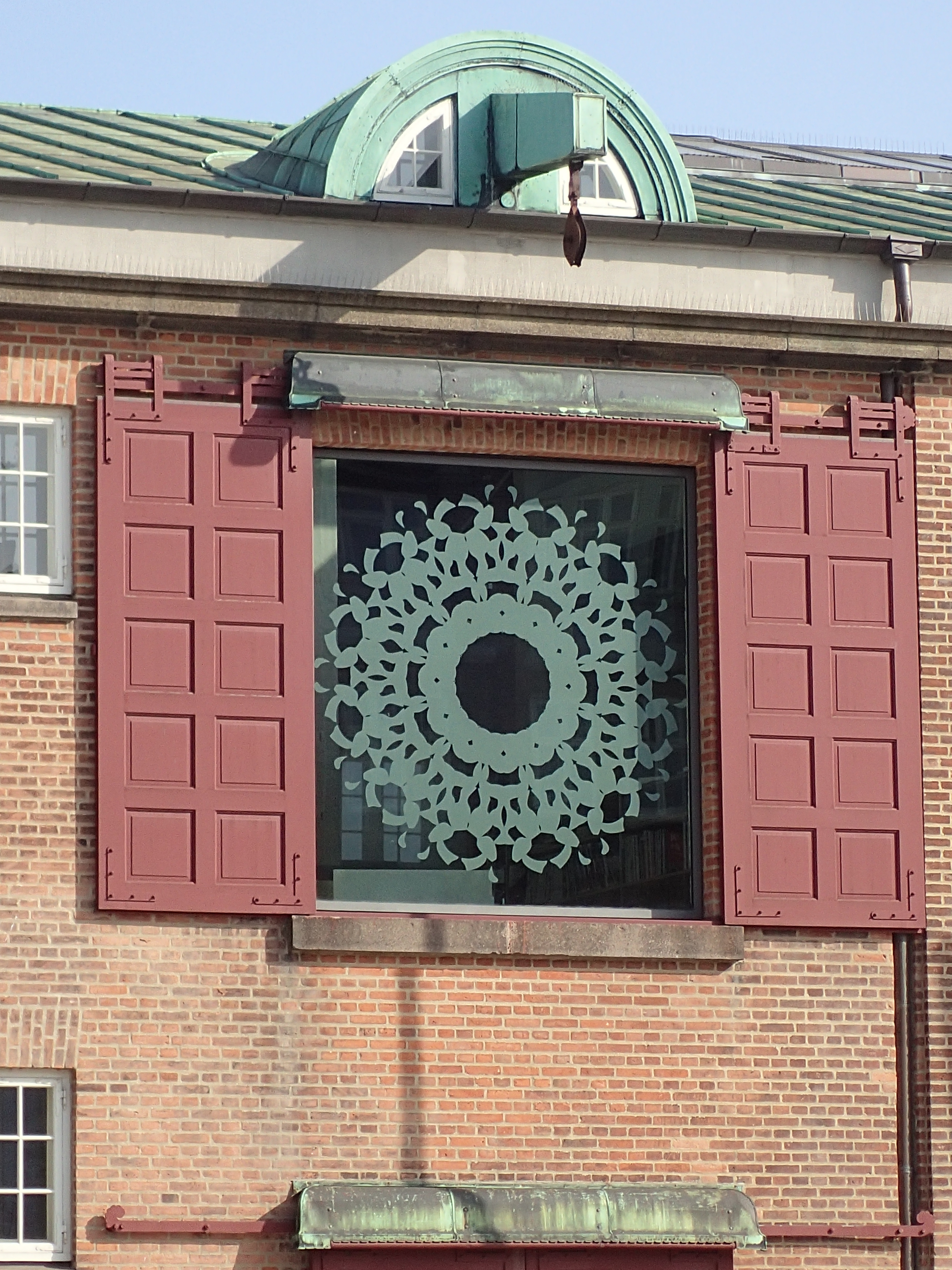
Original copperplated cranes and new sandblasted windows

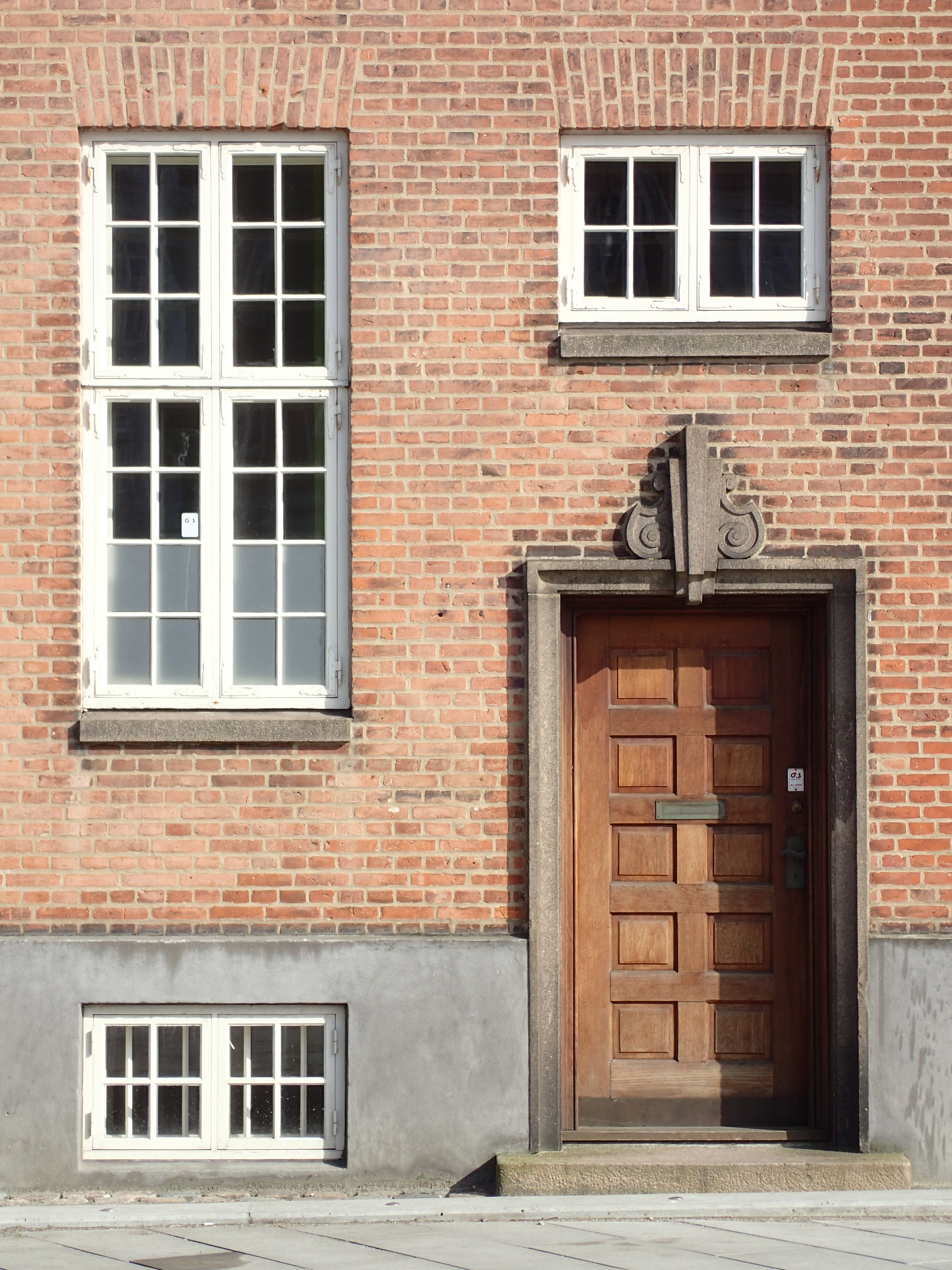
Facade detail

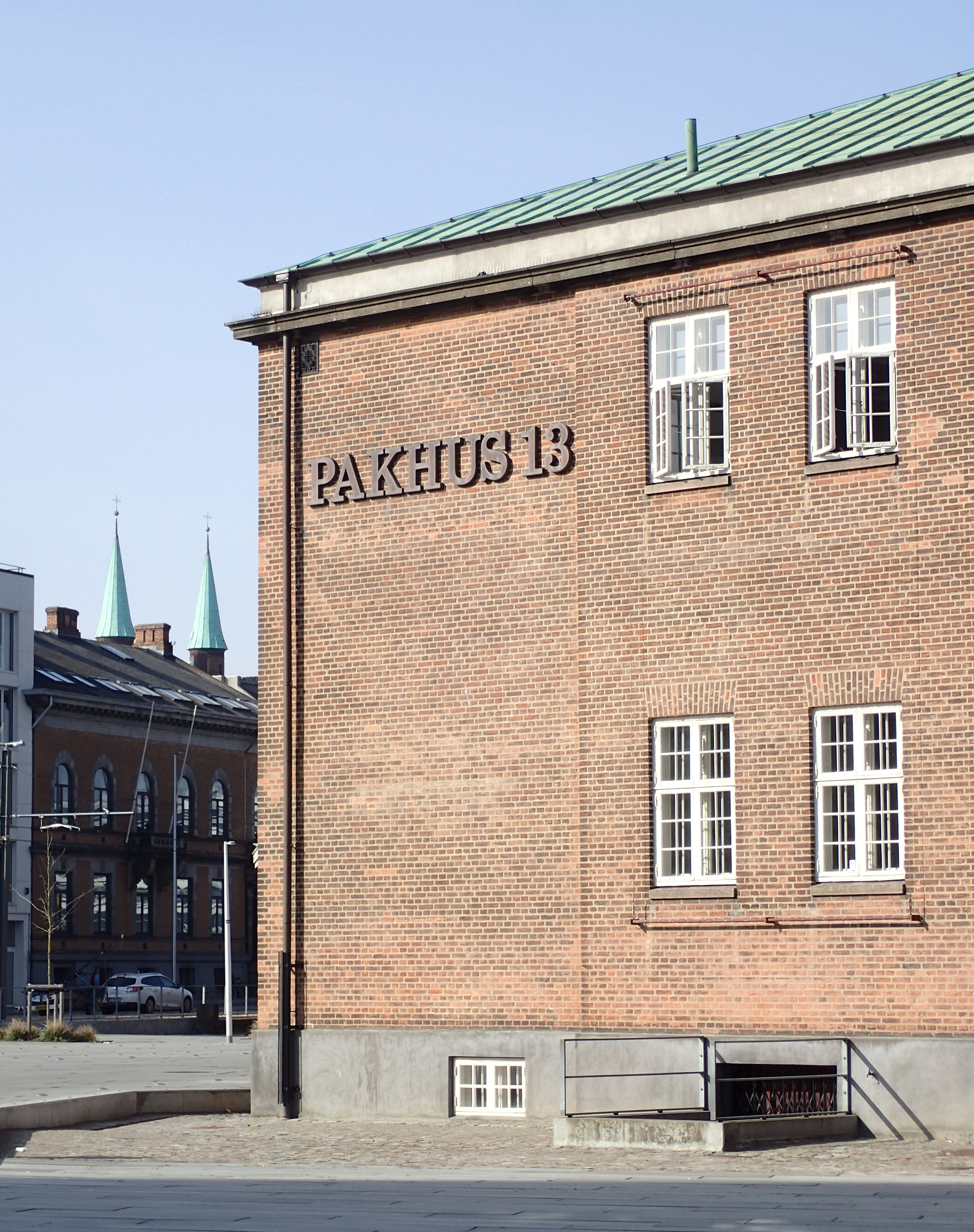
Pakhus 13

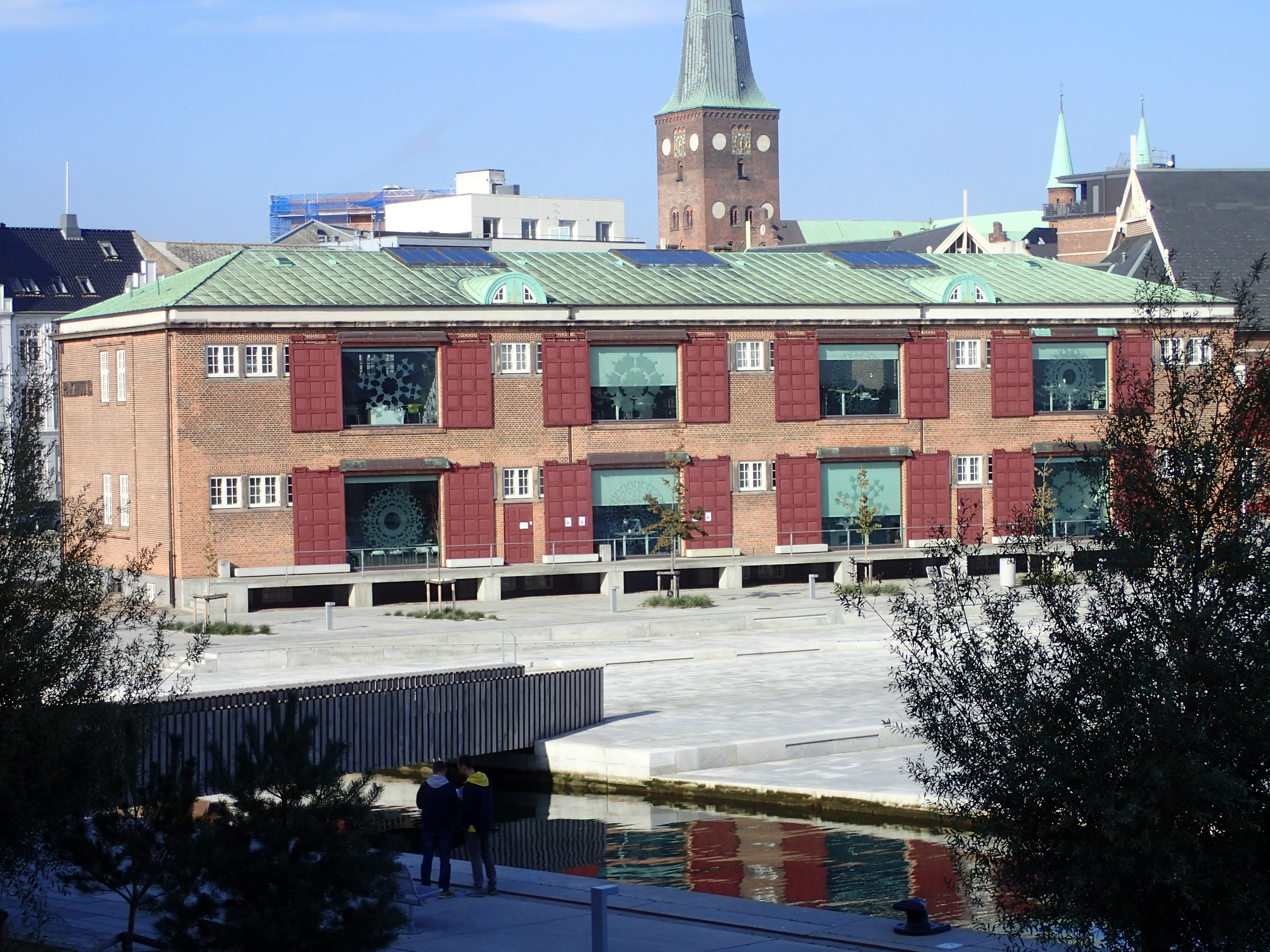
Seaside facade

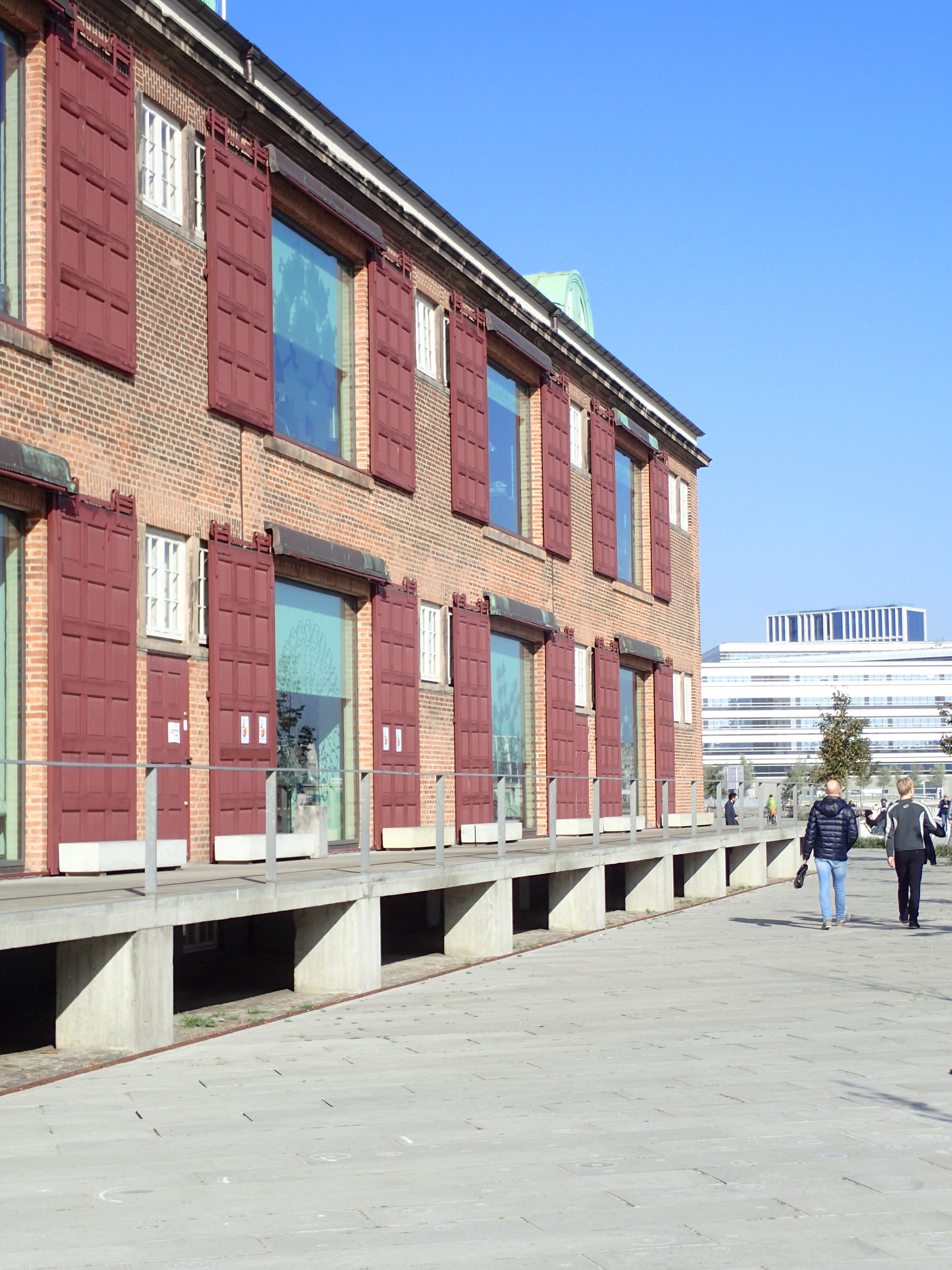
Seaside sundeck

== See also ==
- Listed buildings in Aarhus Municipality
