= Aarhus Oliefabrik A/S =

Company and oil mill in Aarhus, Denmark

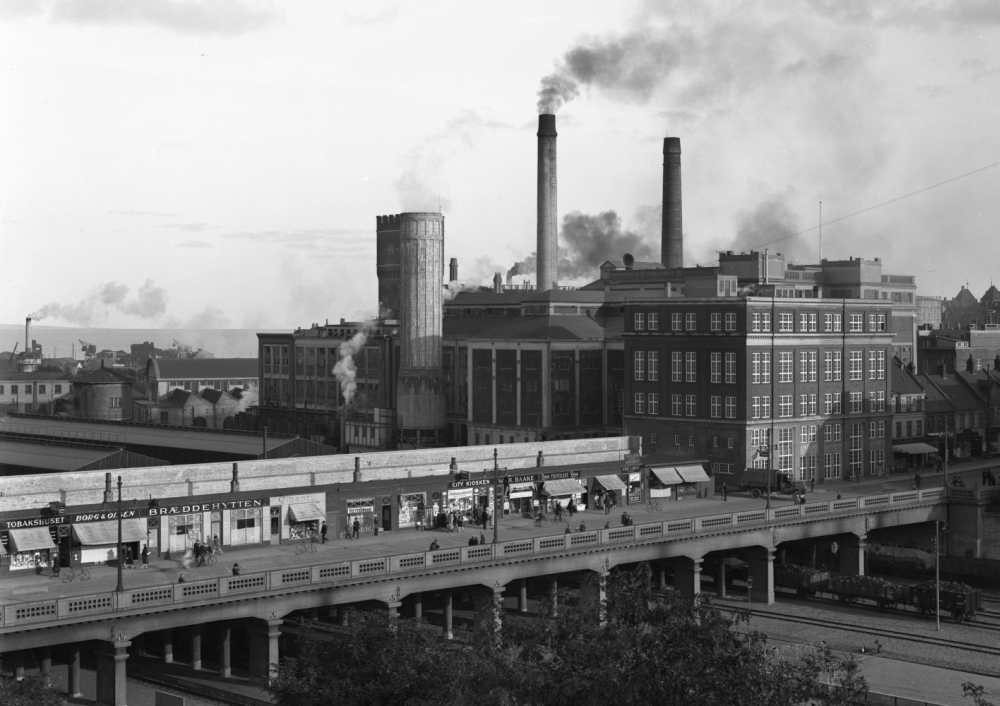
- Aarhus Oliefabrik at M. P. Bruuns Bro, 1935
- Type: Public limited company
- Industry: Manufacturing
- Founded: 1871
- Founder: Otto Mønsted
- Fate: Merged with Karlshamns AB
- Successor: AAK
- Headquarters: Aarhus, Denmark
- Area served: Worldwide
- Products: Vegetable oil, Press cake

Aarhus Oliefabrik A/S (Colloq.: Oliemøllen) was a company and oil mill in Aarhus, Denmark. Established in 1871 it was one of the largest employers and exporters in the city through the late 19th and early 20th centuries.

In 2005, the company merged with the Swedish company Karlshamns AB, forming today's AarhusKarlshamn (AAK).

== History ==
=== Establishment ===
Aarhus Oliefabrik was established in 1871 under the name Aarhus Palmekærnefabrik in the street of Jægergårdsgade. The venture was supported by some of the foremost businessmen at the time, such as Hans Broge and Otto Mønsted. The initial installation produced vegetable oil from palm kernels, seeds, nuts and fruits with press cakes as a byproduct, all sold as animal feed.

=== Expansion and restructuring ===
In the 1880s, the company expanded with a factory in Liepāja, Latvia which was then sold off in 1892, while the factory in Aarhus was restructured to produce margarine oil based on copra, sesame, peanuts and palm kernels. The oil industry at the time was characterized by a few large, international corporations and Aarhus Oliefabrik followed this pattern. The company bought production facilities and established subsidiaries across Europe, especially England, while trade companies and trade posts were established in countries producing the necessary raw materials.

=== Global growth ===
In the early 1900s the company expanded globally, in part through various acquisitions. By the 1940s it accounted for 10% of Denmark's total exports.

In 1942, the oil mill was bombed by the Royal Air Force, when a plane got lost and spotted a target of opportunity in the Port of Aarhus. The pilot attempted to drop five 500 kilogram bombs on German ships, but he missed and the mill suffered extensive damage. The facility was quickly rebuilt and resumed production after the war.

In the 1960s, Aarhus transformed into a leading company for specialty fats and the majority of shares was acquired by Børge Beck-Nielsen in 1978. In the 1980s additional production facilities were built.

=== Merger ===
In 2003, the company and its subsidiaries were reorganized as Aarhus United A/S and in 2005 it merged with Swedish Karlshamns AB to form AarhusKarlshamn AB.

== Company ==
The mill quickly gained a reputation as a welfare oriented company that established social security systems ahead of public legislation and made vacation and free time available for its workers at an unusual rate for the time. With a large number of employees, an active social life and an internal powerplant of its own, Aarhus Oil mill functioned as a small city within the city to some extent. At its height, the mill installation in Aarhus employed one in ten workers in the city.

== Products ==
Aarhus Olie produced vegetable oil and press cakes for agricultural consumption, with large export markets in Russia. Its products made up a third of exports through the Port of Aarhus and a quarter of rail exports.

While the company had started with a focus on the processing of palm kernels, it later added the production of specialty fats for chocolates. Aarhus became a specialist in the processing of shea kernels and the extraction of shea butter, which today is widely used in cosmetics as a moisturizer, salve or lotion.
