= 1944 explosion in Aarhus =

Disaster in Denmark

1944 Aarhus explosion
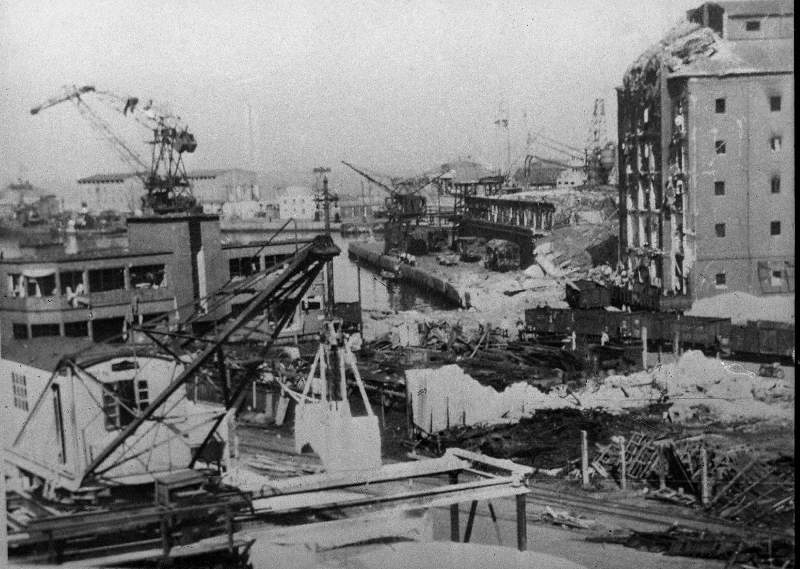
- Harbor area after explosion
- Date: 4 July 1944
- Time: 13:47 (~14:47 UTC)
- Venue: Port of Aarhus
- Location: Aarhus, Central Region, Denmark; 56.160572°N 10.215247°E
- Type: Explosion
- Cause: Unknown
- Deaths: 39
- Injuries: 250

The 1944 explosion in Aarhus or the 4 July Disaster (Danish: 4 Juli Katastrofen) was an explosion in the city of Aarhus, Denmark when a barge loaded with ammunition exploded in the harbor, killing 39 people and injuring another 250.

The explosion occurred in conjunction with the occupation of Denmark during the Second World War. Aarhus had become an increasingly important transport hub for German supplies and troops to occupied Norway, by virtue of a large port in the Kattegat and a railway connection to Germany. Supplies arrived by rail from Germany and were loaded from rail cars to barges in the harbor by Danish dock workers, often by hand. Officials from the Aarhus municipal government had prior to 4 July approached German authorities with safety concerns since accidents with ammunition had previously occurred in Norway; specifically the 1943 Filipstad explosion and the 1944 explosion in Bergen. Discussions were underway about the possibility to move transhipment to a less populated area but by July 1944 no decision had yet been made.

== The explosion ==
The barge was anchored at basin III close to the Korn- og Foderstof Kompagniet silos. At 13:47 on 4 July 1944 it detonated with 150 tonnes of ammunition, sending a kilometer-high column of water into the air, which lingered for several minutes. The explosion could be heard 20 kilometers away in Femmøller on Djursland, in Trige the earth could be felt shaking, in Risskov plaster fell off houses, and in Riis Skov people ran for cover from the beaches.

The barge was flung onto a rail car on the pier and the rail car, entangled with barge, was then launched on to the roof of a nearby storehouse. Buildings and cranes in the area collapsed and large fires broke out in three store houses. 2000 grenades, projectiles and other debris rained over large sections of the city up to a kilometer from the site. The German ship Scharhörn, loaded with another 300 tonnes of ammunition, was anchored 20 meters from the explosion and caught fire, but the tugboat Hermes managed to tow it into the Bay of Aarhus and extinguished the fire.

Thirty-three Danes, primarily dock workers, were killed and another 250 were wounded, 50 seriously. German authorities claimed six Germans killed, which was highly doubted at the time. Postwar studies after the war have concluded that this claim was likely accurate.

== Aftermath ==
The German authorities conducted an investigation and concluded communist sabotage was to blame for the explosion, a claim Danish labor unions contested and vigorously protested against but the investigation was never resumed. The Aarhus Cathedral hosted a memorial service to the victims and in December 1945, after the war, a monument was erected in Vestre Cemetery. Twelve victims could not be identified and were buried in a mass grave. Donations to the families of the victims from across the country amounted to 522,000 kroner.

== Gallery ==
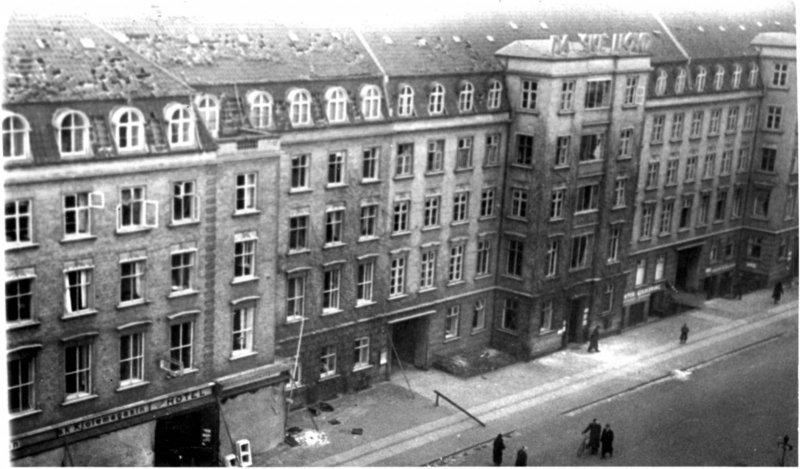
Buildings around the Aarhus Central Station with roofs damaged from falling debris

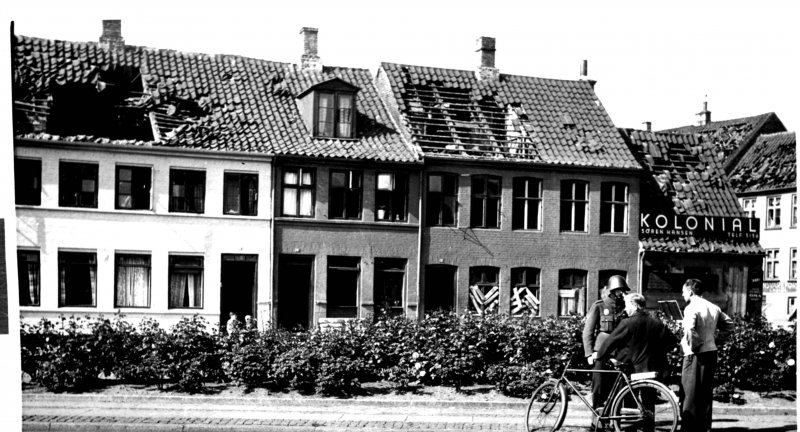
Damaged houses close by the harbor

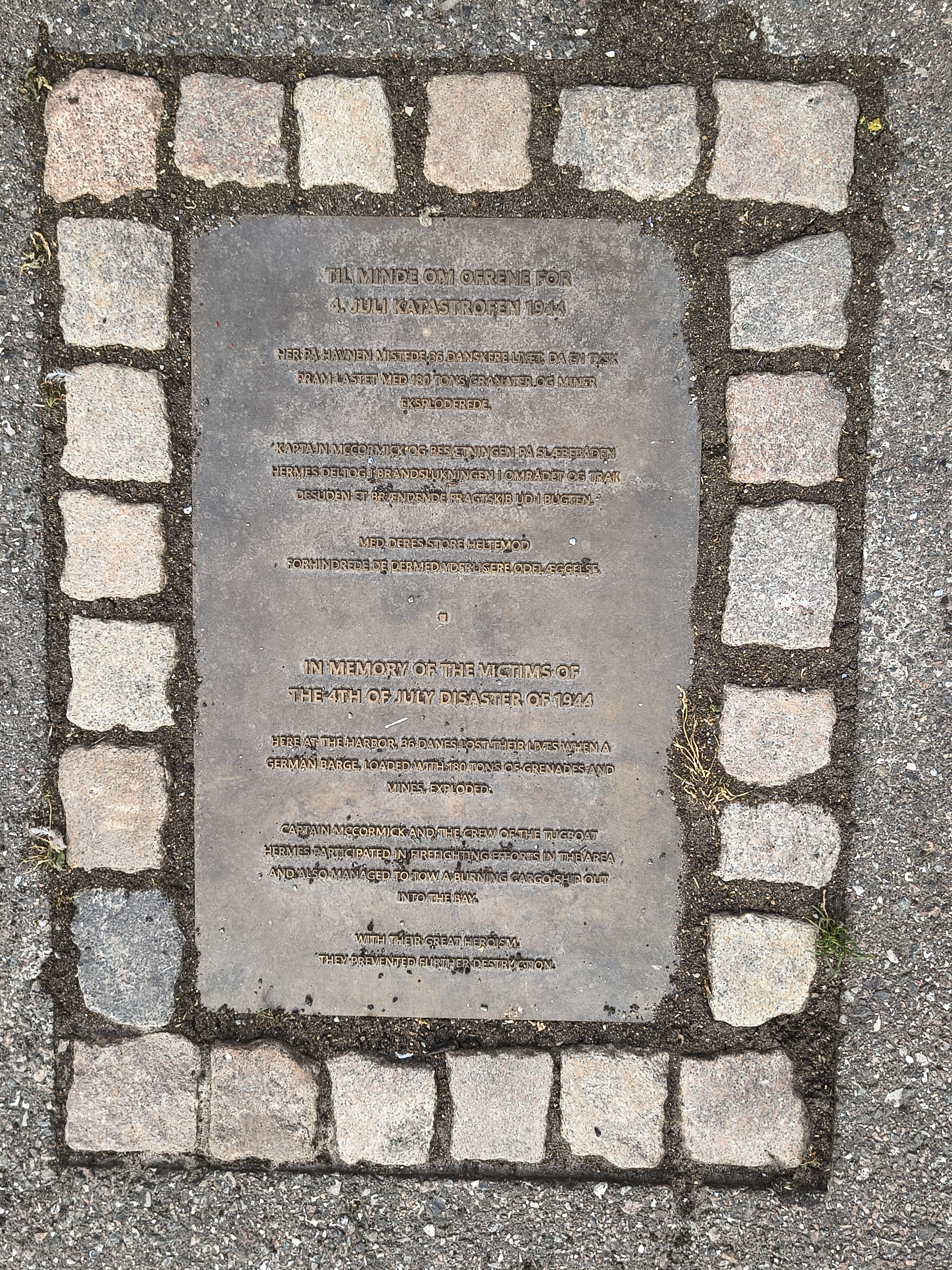
Commemorative plaque on the location ("In memory of the victims of the 4th of July disaster of 1944")
