= Hans Broge =

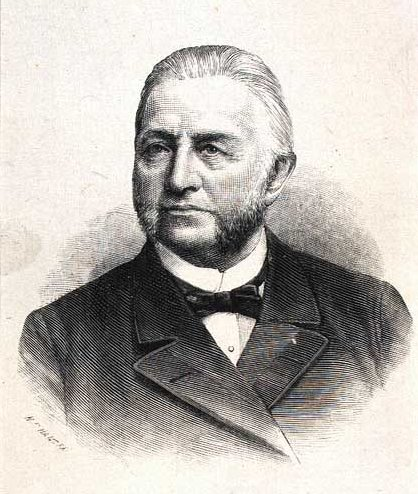
- Hans BRoge c. 1880s
- Born: 4 December 1822; Grenå, Denmark
- Died: 25 March 1908 (aged 85); Aarhus, Denmark

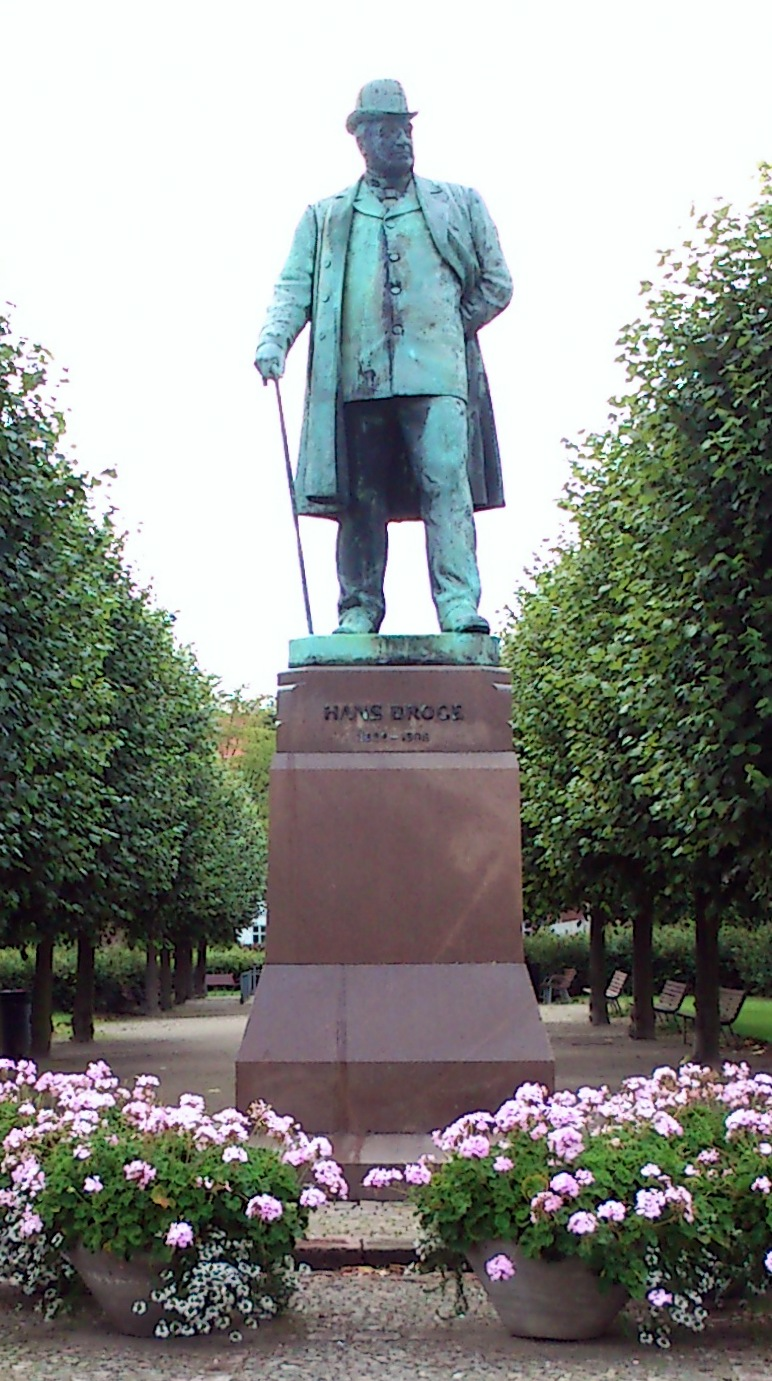
Hans Broge statue on Tietgens Plads

Hans Broge (4 December 1822 – 25 March 1908) was a Danish merchant, politician, Commander of the Order of the Dannebrog and recipient of the Danish Medal of Merit. He became one of the most prominent Danish businessmen of his time and helped establish companies that became major and long-lasting enterprises. Broge particularly affected the city of Aarhus as a major employer and philanthropist and through his tenure on the city council but he also served on the Council of the State for a short period. Broge greatly expanded exports to England and did significant work in training and educating farmers to produce higher quality products. Hans Broge became known as "King Hans" or "King of the Jutes" (Danish: Jydernes Konge) due to his dominant position in the economy of Jutland.

== Politics ==
Hans Broge was active in politics. In 1865 he was elected to the Danish Riksråd and was a member until it was abolished the following year and he was a member of Aarhus City Council from 1857 to 1869. In addition to public office he was a member of the board of Aarhus Handelsforening (Aarhus Trade Association) for many years and became an honorary member of Aarhus Landboforening.

After officially leaving politics Broge remained active in local matters. When the city council had to re-negotiate the contract with the English-owned Det danske gaskompagni (The Danish Gas Company), which operated the gasworks in the city, an agreement could not be reached and the company representative returned to England. While the city council started working on establishing a public gas company instead Hans Broge boarded the same ship as the English negotiator and en route to England bought the gasworks. Subsequently, he offered the gasworks to the city council for the same price or to run it personally. The city council accepted the offer and purchased it. In 1880 a dispute over unpaid taxes erupted between Broge and the city council. On 5 May 1881 the city council received a letter from Broge stating that the condition for paying the disputed amount was that two projects had to be realized. One was the construction of Sct. Clement's Bridge over the Aarhus River by Sct. Clement's Cathedral and the other was a rail line to Odder. In exchange Broge agreed to pay the 14.000 Danish Kroner in taxes along with a donation of 10.000 for the construction of the bridge. The city council accepted his offer and both bridge and rail line was inaugurated in 1884,

== Business ==
15 years old he became an apprentice at the prominent merchant Harboe Meulengracht in Aarhus. After completing his apprenticeship he worked as a salesman in Randers before moving to Hamburg where he worked for a German company. In 1847 Broge returned to Aarhus where he established his own business in Mindegade in what is today known as Hans Broge's House. Due to his connections in Germany and his brother who worked as a merchant in Hamburg he was able to continue trading during the German sieges of Denmark in 1849 and 1864 which proved a substantial advantage. In 1866 Hans Broge had become the largest taxpayer in the city.

In 1864 Broge had turned his attention to England and started exports of agricultural products, especially butter, in return for coal and other raw materials. Prior to Hans Broge much of the butter in Jutland was bought by Kieler merchants and then sold on to England but Broge gradually set up exports directly to England. The butter export became a major success for Danish agriculture and spurred the early agricultural co-operatives. Broge also co-founded Aarhus Palmekærnefabrik and Korn- og Foderstof Kompagniet which became major employers in the city and owned a number of smaller businesses such as 2 brickyards, 3 farms and 4 merchant ships. In addition to trade Broge was active in a number of transport companies. He co-founded the Jysk-Engelsk Dampskibsselskab (Jut-English Steamship Company) and Dampskibsselskabet Aarhus-København (Aarhus-Copenhagen Steamship Company) with routes to Newcastle and Copenhagen respectively. In 1877 he helped establish the rail line to Ryomgård and later another to Odder, which is still in operation today.

== Agriculture reform ==
Butter became the chief export but initially suffered from poor quality. Hans Broge, along with his son-in-law Otto Mønsted, started various projects to educate farmers in order to heighten quality of their products. In 1868 they introduced winter-butter at a large agricultural exhibition in Aarhus which was followed by many other exhibitions and trade shows, often attended by other prominent merchants of the time such as Johan Ankerstjerne from Randers and Levy from Horsens. Broge also agitated strongly for increased malt production as a better animal feed and himself started importing better feed so more and better butter could be produced year-round. Broge also worked to establish an Agricultural School in Malling which is today a part of the Centre for Agriculture.

The effect on local agriculture was significant and led to an export boom and the effect on the agricultural community was substantial and Broge was awarded an honorary membership of the Aarhus Agricultural Association (Århus landboforening).

== Personal life ==
Hans Broge was born in Grenå in 1822 to Niels and Anna Sofie Broge. When he was six-years old his father died in a drowning accident leaving his mother alone with 4 children. Broge was married to Inger Kirstine Brock on 10 October 1849 and the couple had 6 children; 3 daughters and 3 sons. Their daughter Anna Sophie married Otto Mønsted and Severine married Christian Rømer. Inger Kirstine Broge died on 26 May 1894 due to an accidental fall and Hans Broge died on 25 March 1908.

== Legacy ==
Hans BRoge's funeral procession from Aarhus Cathedral to the family grave on Søndre Kirkegård (Søndre Cemetery) was attended by a large number of people. Søndre Cemetery has since been closed and the grave moved to Nordre Kirkegård where it remains today.

Hans Broge's significance was realized while he was still alive. In the 1860s the nickname "King Hans" is seen for the first time and during 25th wedding anniversary in October 1874 flags were raised across the city. In 1901 at the age of 78 Hans Broge had a newly established road on Frederiksbjerg named after him. It runs from St. Paul's Church to Dalgas Avenue. In 1910, 2 years after his death, a statue of Broge by the sculptor Axel Hansen was unveiled on Tietgen's Square, overlooking Hans Broge's Street. In Brabrand the area formerly occupied by his summer residence is today known as Hans Broge's Bakker (Hans Broge's Hills) and the road that led to his house is named Hans Broge's Road. The passenger ferry between Aarhus and Copenhagen was named for Hans Broge between 1939 and 1969,
