= AAK (company) =

Producer of Vegetable Oils and Fats

AAK AB
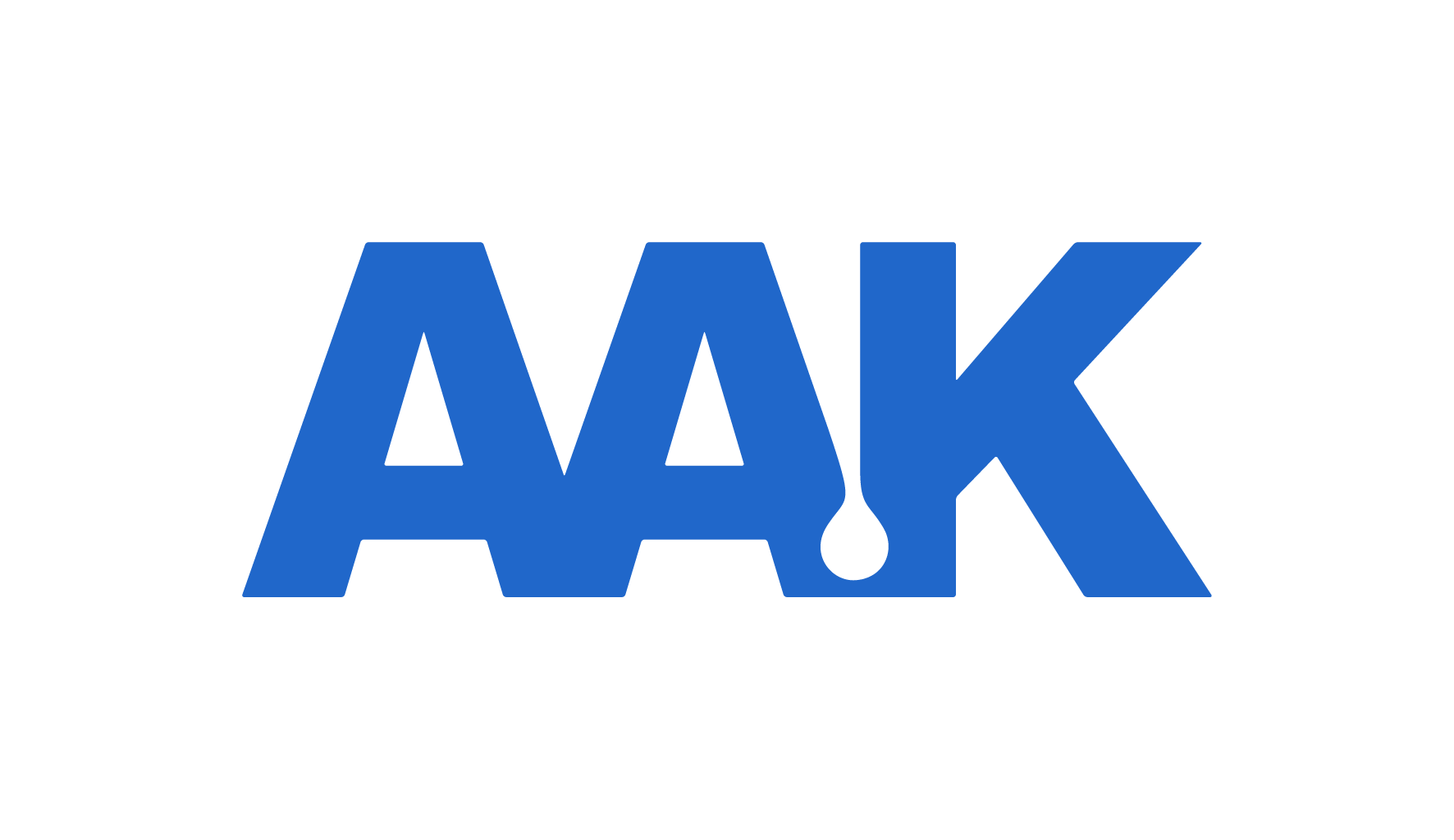
- Company type: Public
- Traded as: Nasdaq Stockholm: AAK
- Industry: Vegetable Oils and Fats
- Founded: 2005; 21 years ago
- Headquarters: Malmö, Sweden
- Key people: Georg Brunstam (chairman of the board); Johan Westman (president and CEO)
- Revenue: ▲SEK 35,452 million (2021)
- Operating income: ▲SEK 2,393 million (2020)
- Number of employees: 4,013 (2021)
- Website: www.aak.com

AAK AB, formerly AarhusKarlshamn, is a global Sweden-based company and producer of vegetable oils and fats.

== History ==
The company, formerly known as AarhusKarlshamn, was founded in 2005 through the merger of Karlshamns AB (founded 1918 in Karlshamn, Sweden) and Aarhus United A/S (founded 1871 in Aarhus, Denmark).

== Company ==
The company has been listed, as the current legal entity, on the Stockholm Stock Exchange (OMX) since 2005 and had a total market cap of about 50,2 billion SEK, as of April 30, 2021. As of December 31, 2021, the group had a total turnover of 35,452 million SEK, an operating profit of 2,393 million SEK, and 4,013 employees globally.

=== Production facilities ===
The group has production facilities in numerous countries with its main production units situated in:

- Runcorn, United Kingdom
- Villavicencio, Colombia
- Louisville, United States
- Jundiaí, Brazil
- Zhangjiagang, China
- Richmond (CA), United States
- Khopoli, India
- Aarhus, Denmark
- Hull, United Kingdom
- Karlshamn, Sweden
- Montevideo, Uruguay
- Morelia, Mexico
- Newark (NJ), United States
- Zaandijk, The Netherlands
- Merksem, Belgium
- Dalby, Sweden
- Hillside (NJ), United States
- Rotterdam, The Netherlands
- St Leonards-on-Sea, United Kingdom

== Products ==
The company's products are used in a wide variety of applications in the food, confectionery, pharmaceutical, cosmetic, chemical and animal feed industries.

== Awards and recognitions ==
In 2021, AAK was named world's second top specialty oil company by the Chinese food media FoodTalks.

== See also ==
- List of Swedish companies
