= Frederik Draiby =

Danish architect

Frederik Marius Draiby
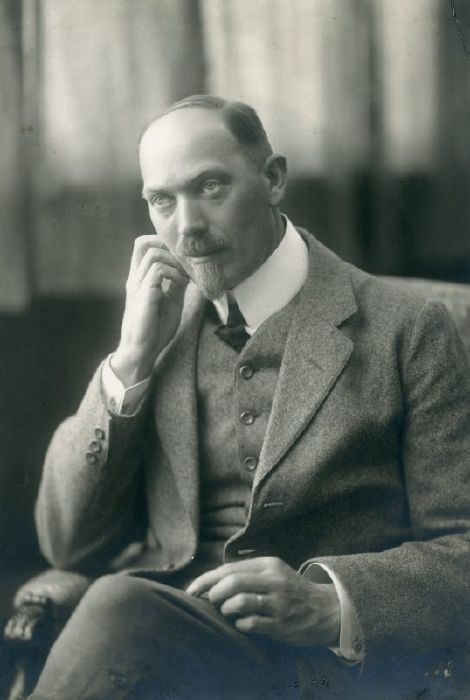
- Born: 28 April 1877; Kirke Helsinge, Denmark
- Died: 16 April 1966 (aged 88); Aarhus, Denmark
- Education: Royal Danish Academy of Fine Arts
- Occupation: Architect
- Buildings: Spanien Public Baths; Stykgodspakhuset

Frederik Marius Draiby (28 April 1877 in Kirke Helsinge on western Zealand — 16 April 1966 in Aarhus) was a Danish architect and the first city engineer of Aarhus. Until his retirement in 1943 Frederik Draiby impacted the architecture in Aarhus through his job where he approved building designs and with several notable buildings of his own designs. The municipal Spanien Public Baths, the harbor warehouse Stykgodspakhuset and Store Kapel (Great Chapel) on Vestre Cemetery are his best known works although he also worked on urban planning designs.

== Background ==
Frederik Draiby was born in Kirke Helsinge where his father worked as a master builder. Draiby moved to Copenhagen to study at the Technical School. He graduated as a mason and was then admitted to the Royal Danish Academy of Fine Arts architecture school in 1898. From 1898 to 1900 he worked for the architect Vilhelm Dahlerup. In 1901, Draiby travelled to Cape Town in South Africa where he was employed by the architect Herbert Thomas Jones and in 1903, he became a partner in the company. The following year he was appointed director of the department in Johannesburg. In 1905, Draiby married a Swedish woman and started preparing to move back to Denmark. In 1907 he was back in Denmark where he was hired at the city engineer's office in Copenhagen. In 1919, the office of city engineer was established in Aarhus and Draiby was hired for the position on 1 October 1919.

== Works ==
Draiby's primary contribution as city engineer was creating architectural uniformity within neighborhoods such as the Stadion Allé borough in Frederiksbjerg. He also created a number of works of his own such as the terraced houses on Poul Martin Møllers Vej, twin houses in Marienlund and two apartment blocks at Søndre Ringgade and Trepkasgade. The two apartment blocks are also on Frederiksbjerg and the largest one is considered among the finest examples of neoclassical architecture in Aarhus. For Vestre Cemetery he built the Great Chapel and by the harbor the Functionalist Spanien Public Baths.

- Spanien Public Baths
- Great Chapel Vestre Cemetery
- Terraced houses on Poul Martin Møllers Vej
- Twin houses in Marienlund (1926)
- Two apartment blocks at Søndre Ringgade and Trepkasgade
- Den Permanente
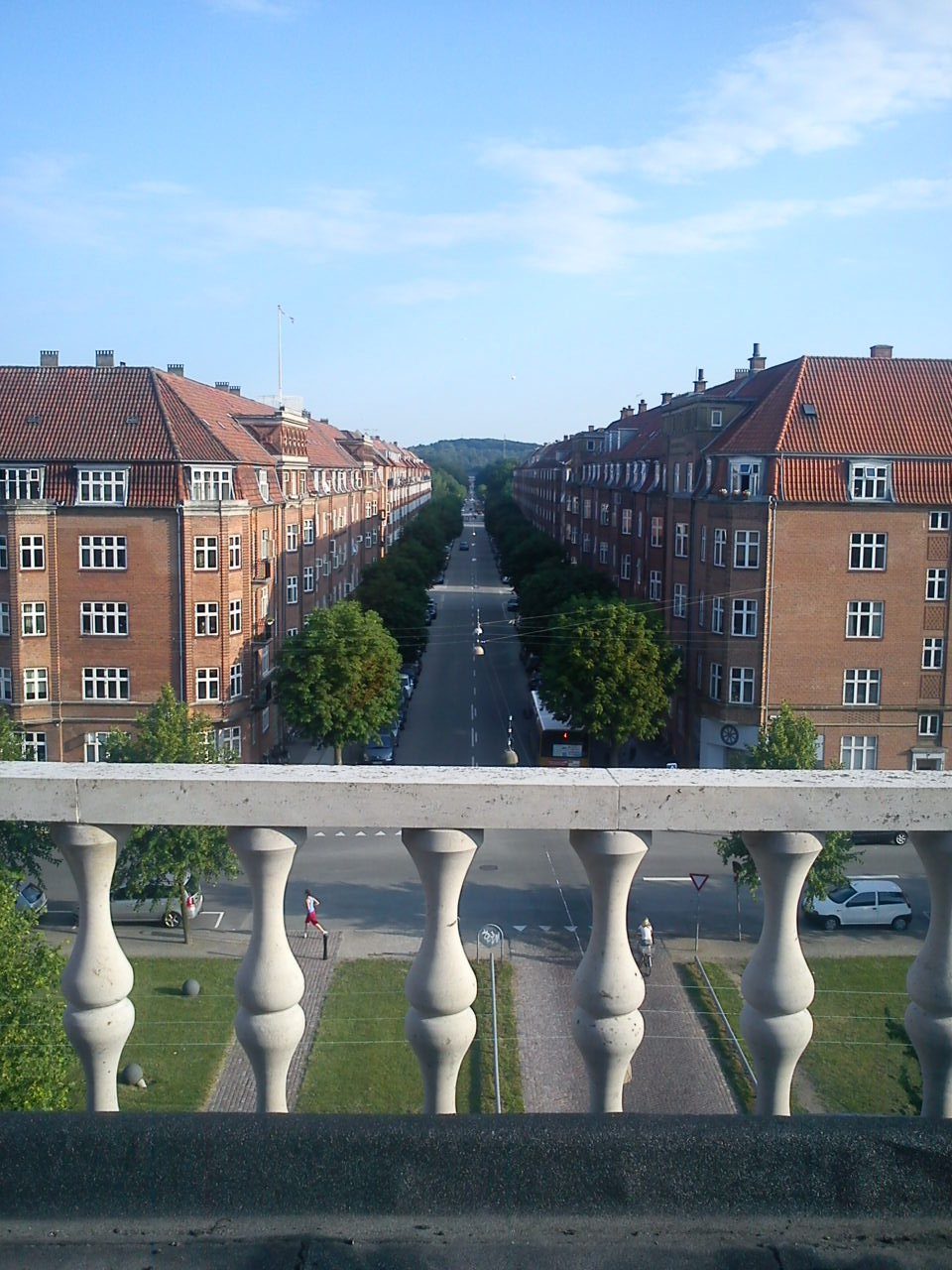
City planning (Stadion Allé, around 1920)

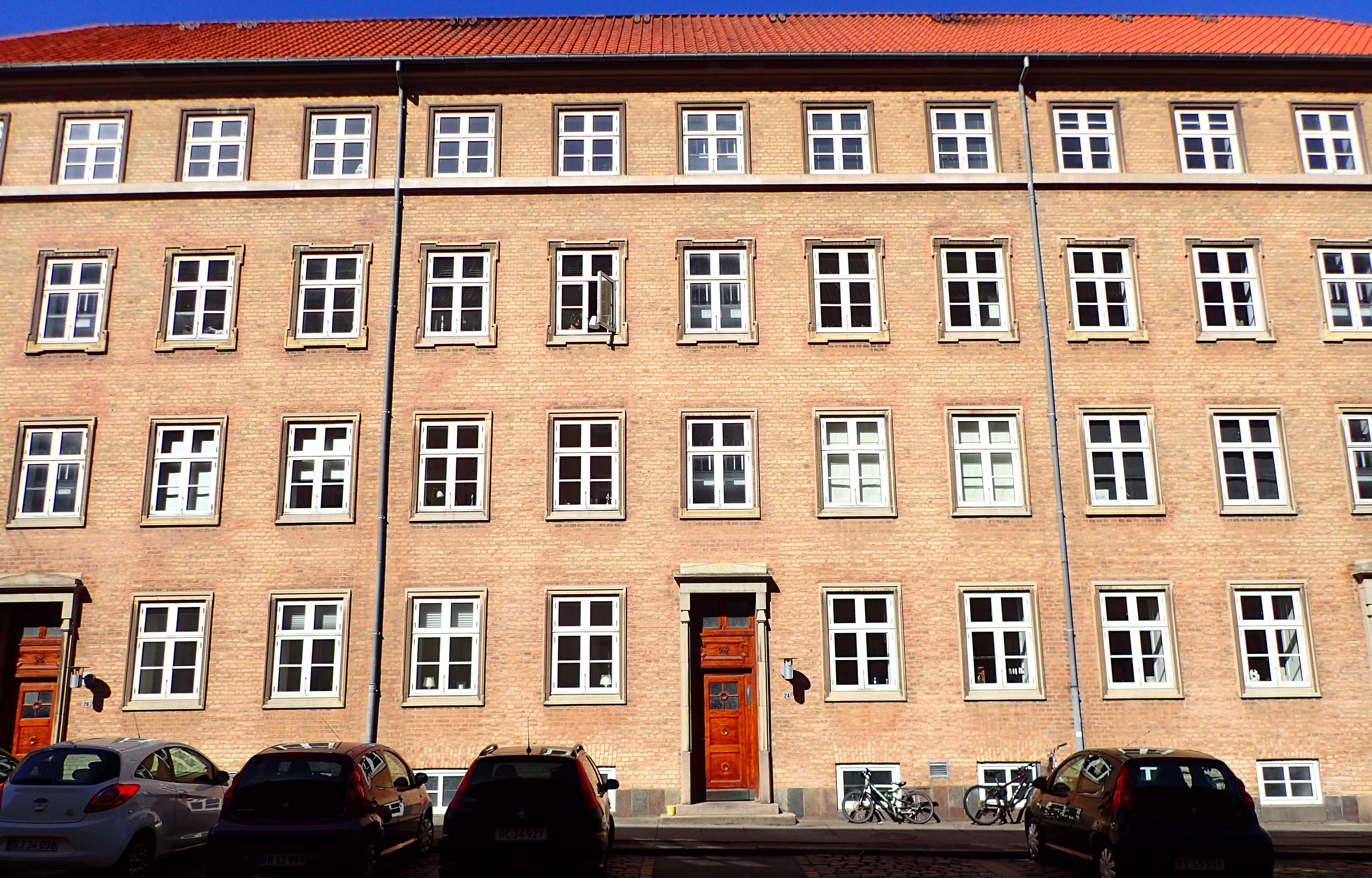
Frederiksbjerg-bo (1926, Trepkasgade)

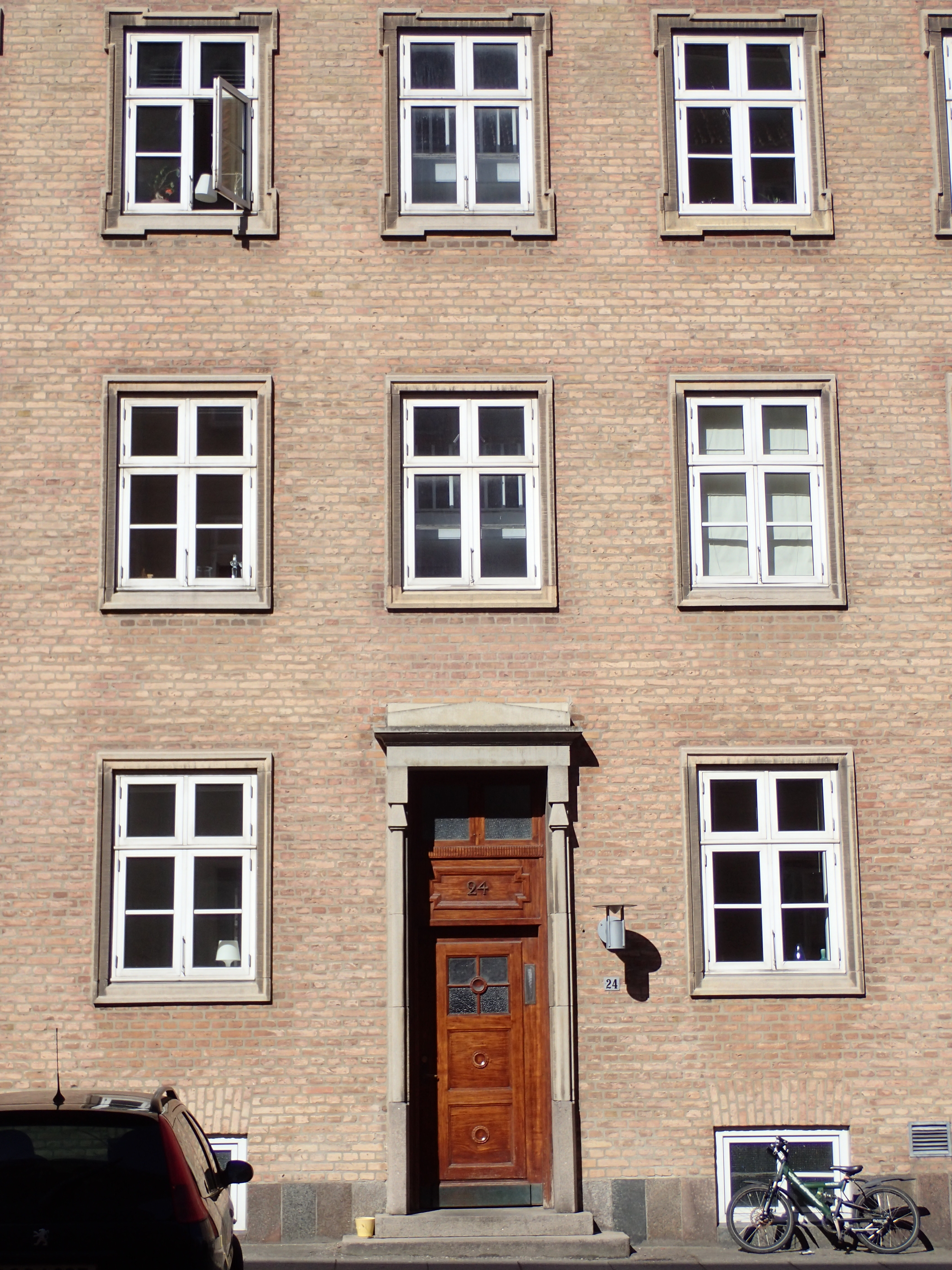
Frederiksbjerg-bo (detail)

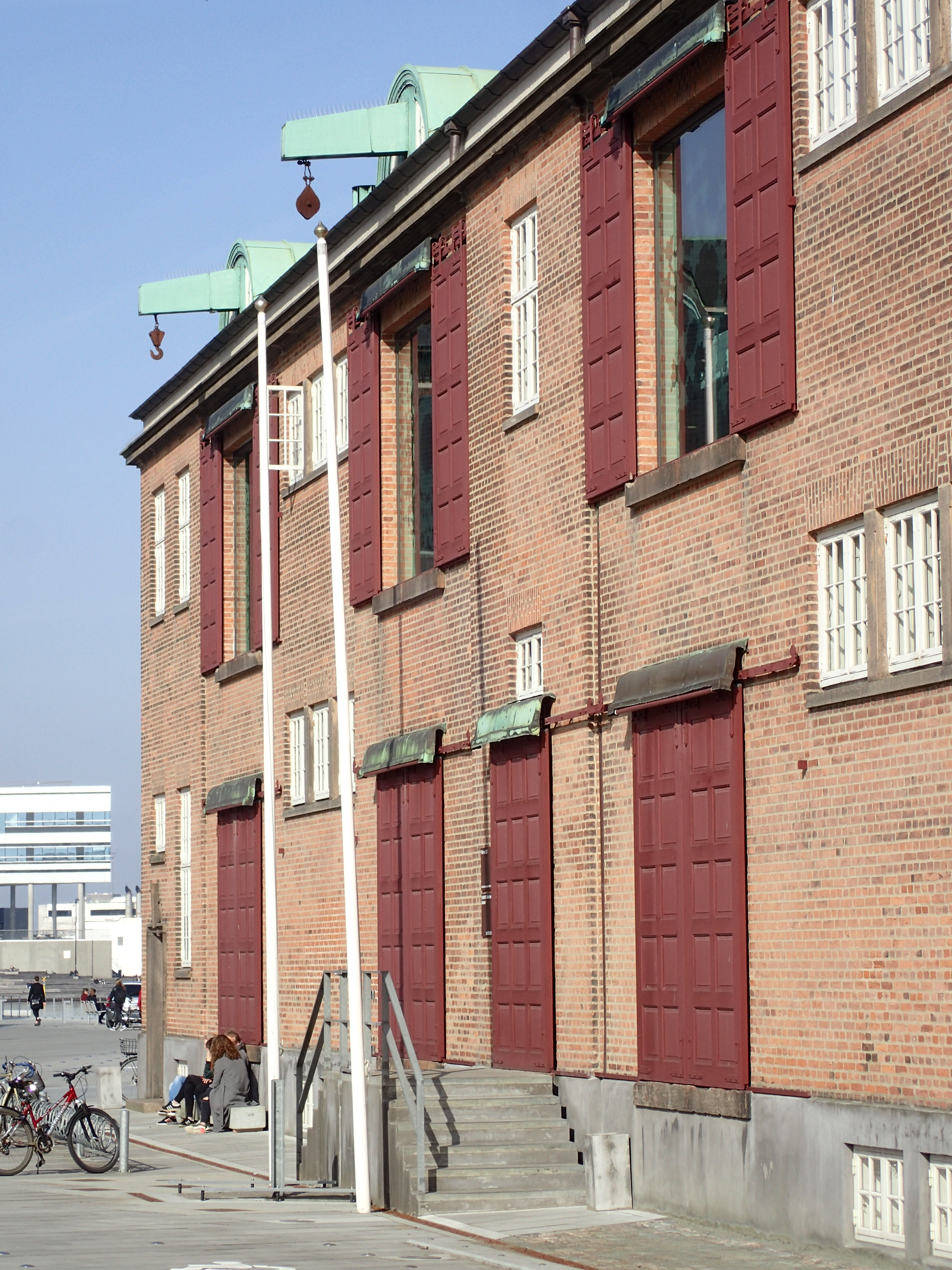
Pakhus 13 (1926)

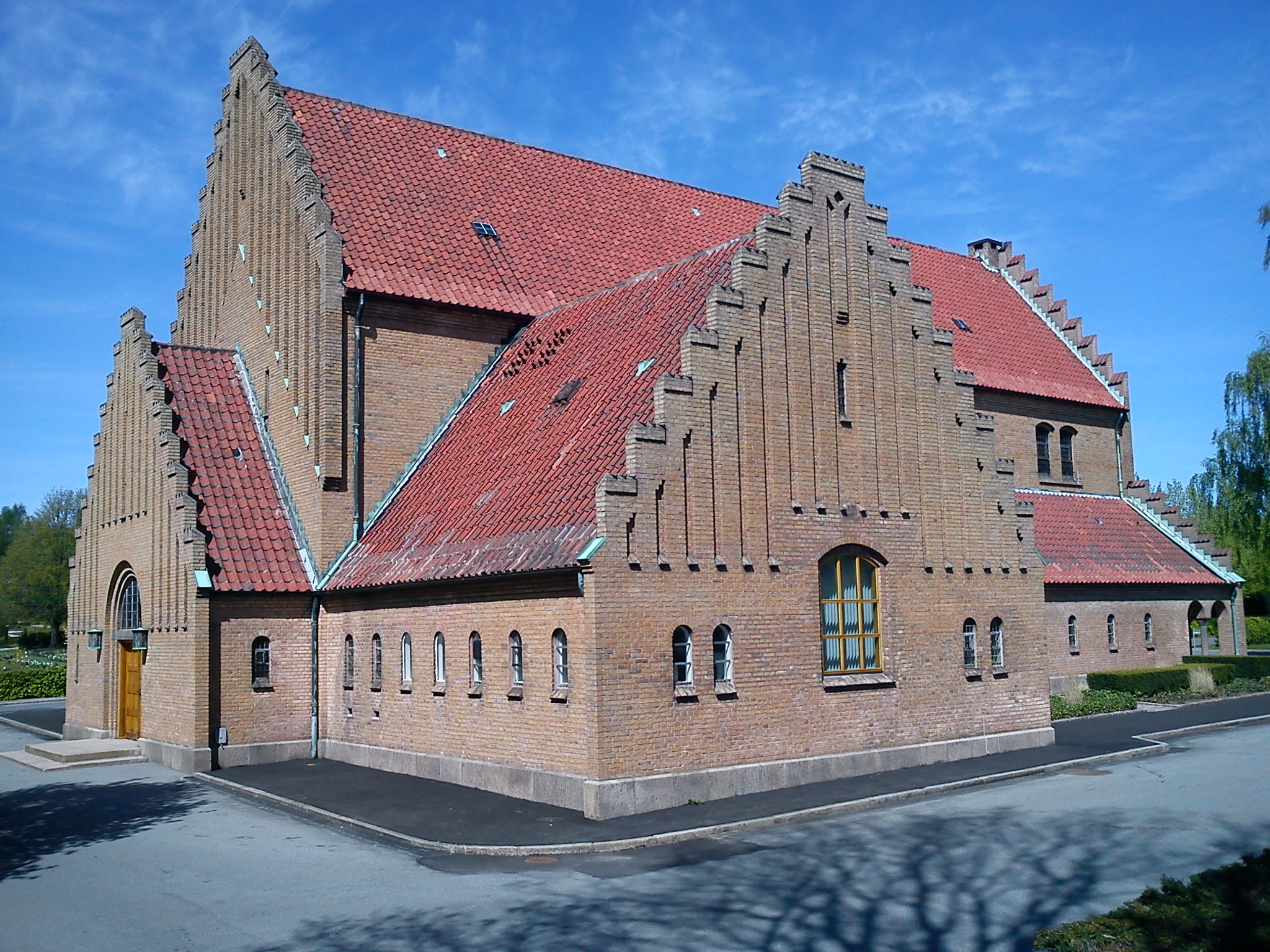
Great Chapel (1927)
