= Spanien Public Baths =

Coordinates: 56.1517°N 10.2110°E

- Badeanstalten Spanien
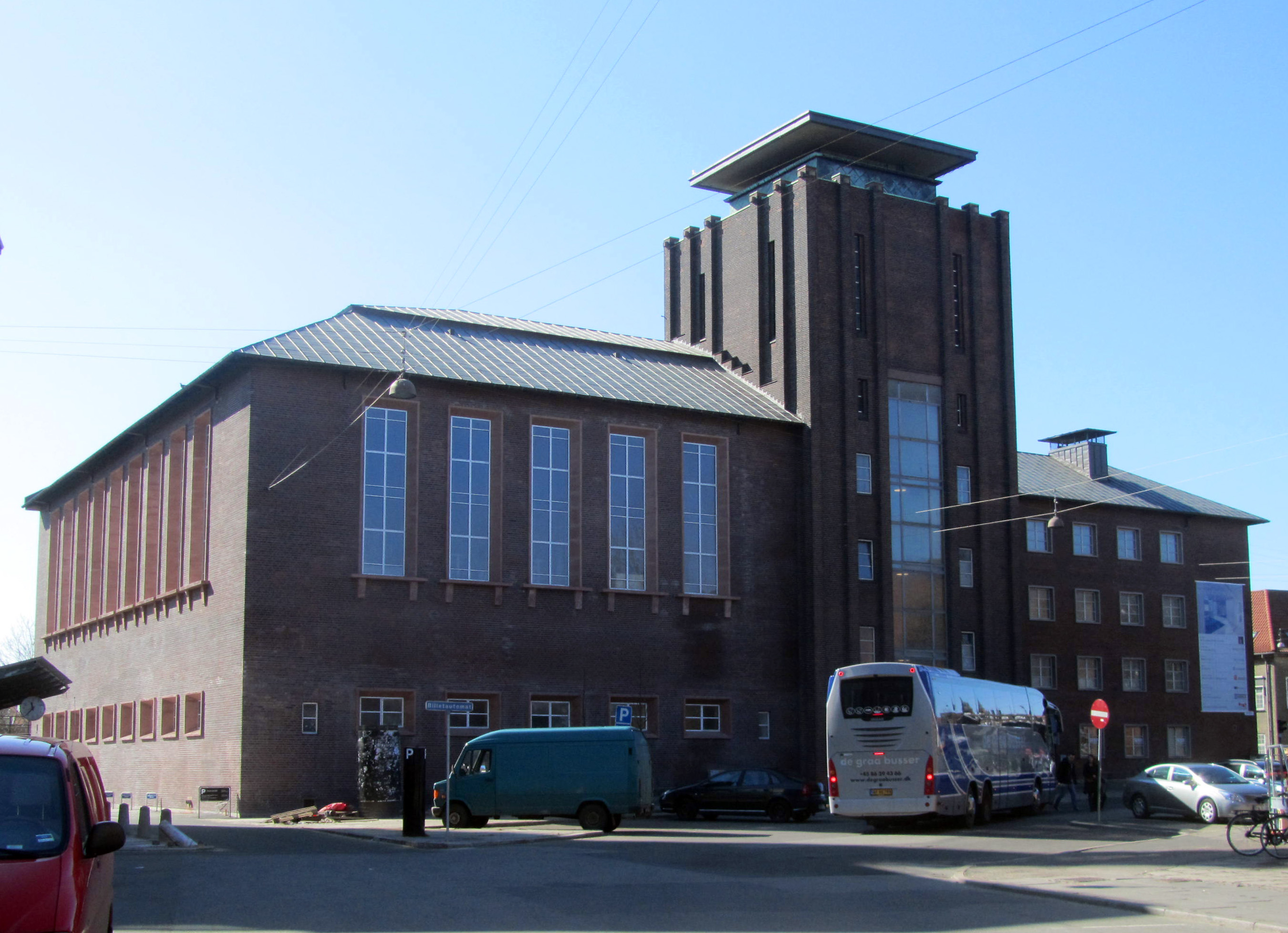
- Badeanstalten Spanien
- Interactive map of the Spanien Public Baths area

General information
- Architectural style: Functionalism
- Location: Aarhus, Denmark
- Construction started: 1931
- Completed: 1933
- Inaugurated: 15 September 1933

Technical details
- Floor count: 4
- Floor area: 5,984 m^{2} (64,410 sq ft)

Design and construction
- Architect: Frederik Draiby

Website
- Aarhus Municipality Website for Spanien

Spanien Public Baths (Danish: Badeanstalten Spanien), colloquially known simply as Spanien, is a public bath house and a listed building in Aarhus, Denmark. The bath house was completed in 1931 and was listed on the Danish national registry of protected buildings and places by the Danish Heritage Agency on 15 February 1989 as a fine example of the Nordic funkis style. The building was thoroughly renovated in 2010–12.

The name Spanien (Spain) refers to the harbour district street where the bath house is situated. In Denmark, harbour district streets are normally named after foreign destinations.

== History ==
In 1926, the at the time only public bath house in Aarhus closed and it was decided that a new one was to be built on an available lot on the street of Spanien. The project was budgeted at 750,000 Danish Kroner. Construction commenced in 1931 and was completed in 1933 but at a cost twice as high as initially projected. The finished building included an Olympic-size swimming pool, public showers on the ground floor, a luxury department on the 3rd floor, restaurant, hairdresser and other facilities.

Spanien was constructed with the newest technology in mind. There was a system to create artificial pine-scented rain, underwater lighting, heated floors surrounding the pools, seawater was piped from the condensers of the nearby power plant, in the saunas chairs made of steel pipes were water cooled and every department had a phone line. The technological solutions drew much attention at the time and some 60,000 visitors, mainly from Jutland, came to see the new state of the art bath house and pool.

In the 1930s, the swimming pool was frequently used for international competitions and numerous world records were set here. Prominent local swimmers at the time was Kirsten Busch-Sørensen, Fritze Nathansen og Eva Arndt.

== Architecture and design ==
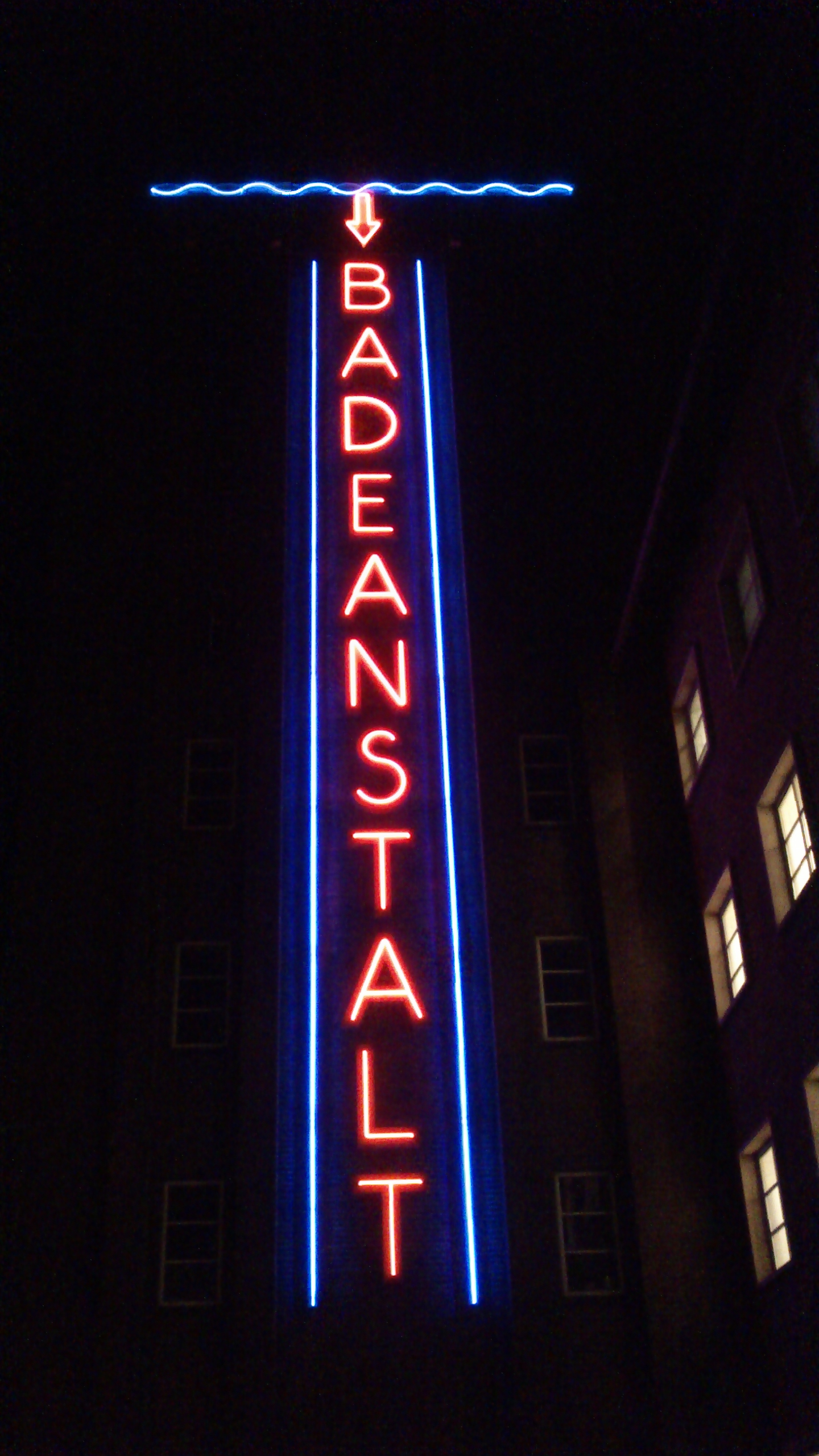
The large outside neon signs by night

Spanien Public Baths was designed by city engineer Frederik Draiby and is a good example of Nordic functionalist architecture, commonly referred to as Nordic "funkis". It is a massive four-story building with a six-story tower, all in red brick and topped with plated copper hip roofs. Brick and copper are typical Danish building materials. The whole building has a spartan, clean style in the spirit of functionalism. The large main building is mostly free of decorations but the tower features flat brick columns reminiscent of classical pilastres. Classical Greek elements can also be found in some architectural details inside the swimming hall itself. The interior of the building is painted very colorful, breaking stylistically with the simple exterior and communicating the purpose of various areas and spaces, a characteristic feature of Nordic funkis. Marble, sandstone and polished stainless steel is used extensively inside the bathhouse and the railings and architectural glazing, both featuring prominently throughout, are other tell-tale signs of this particular architectural direction.

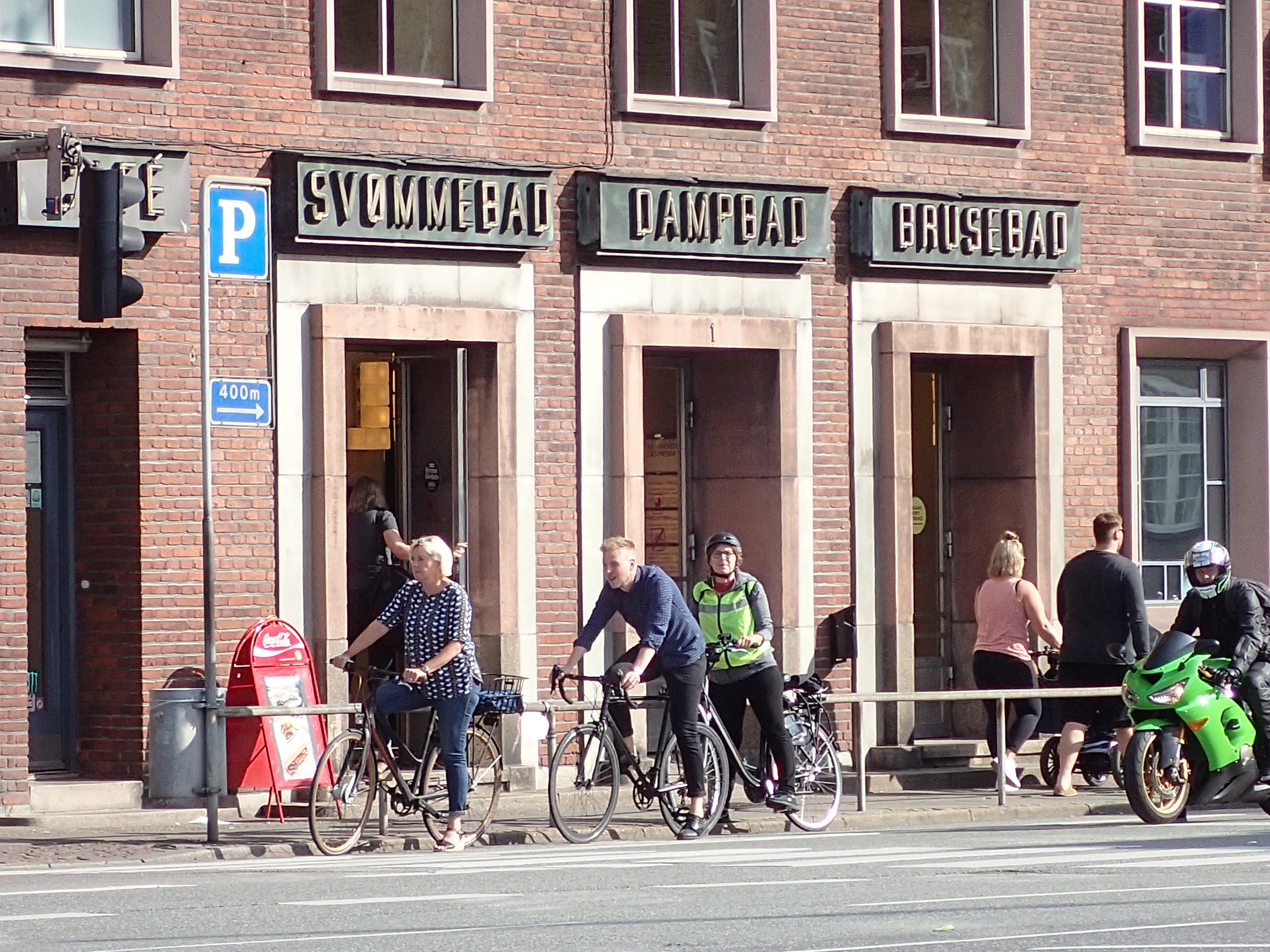
Main entrances

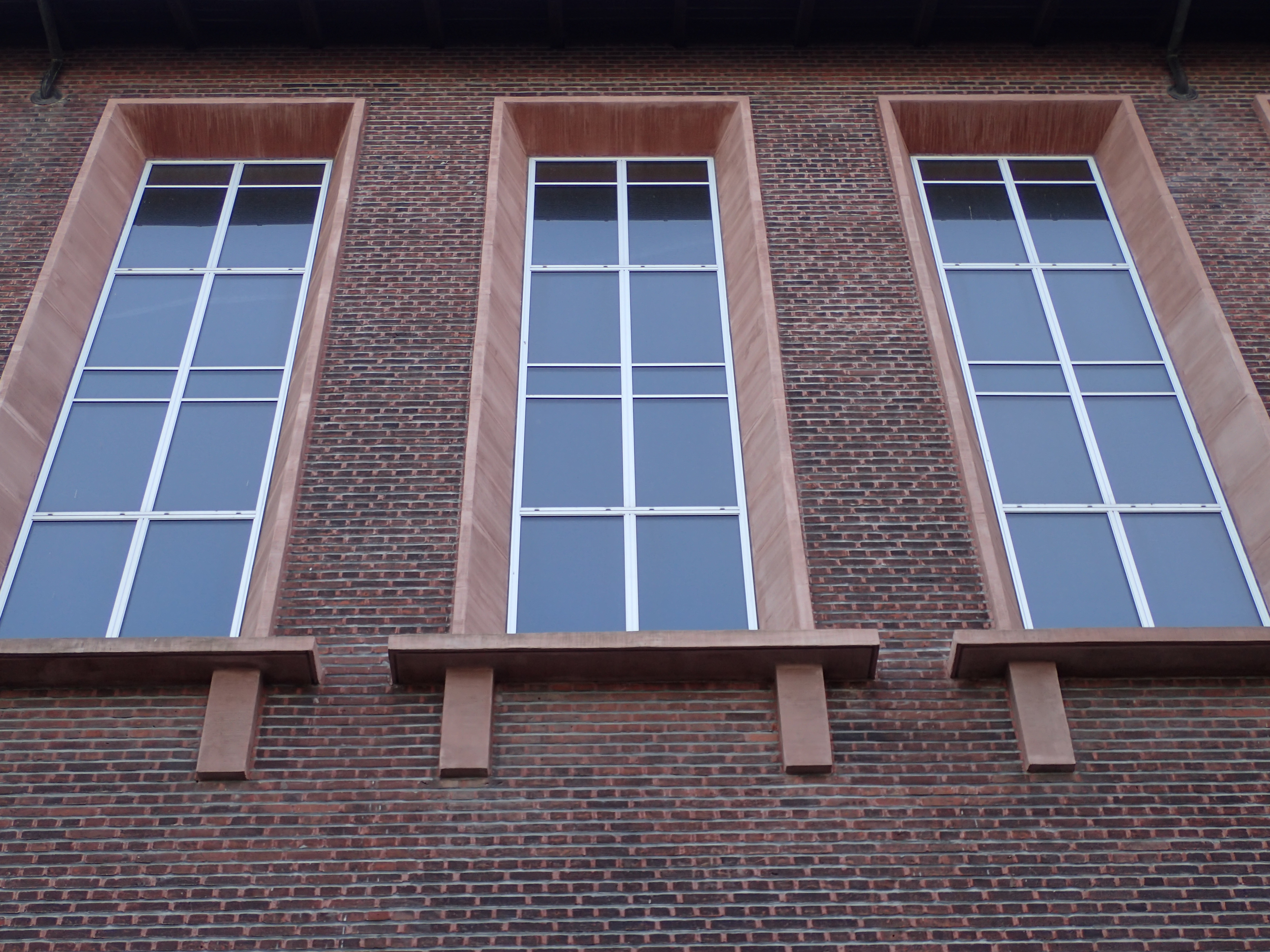
Windows

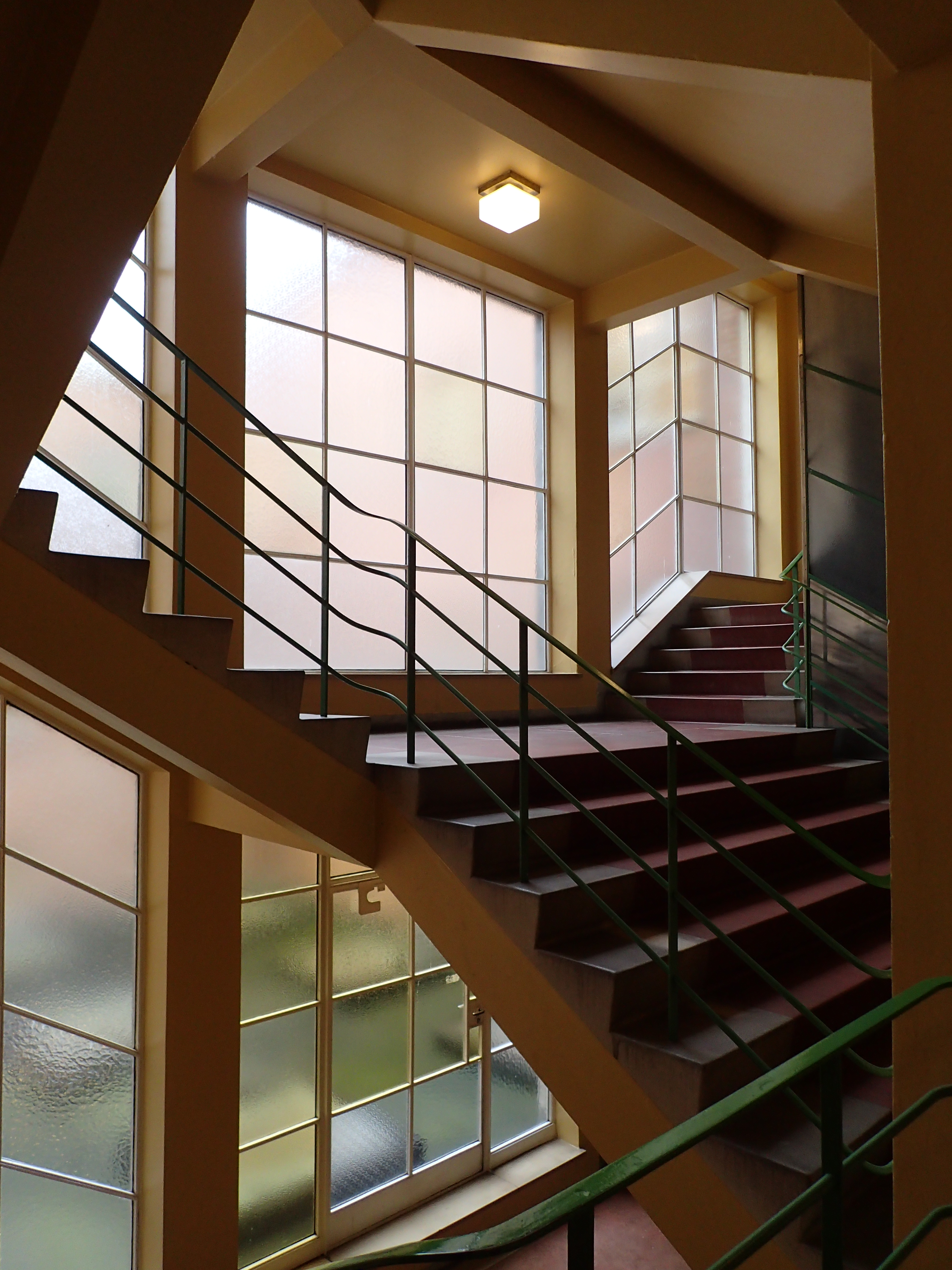
Entry stairwell and architectural glazing

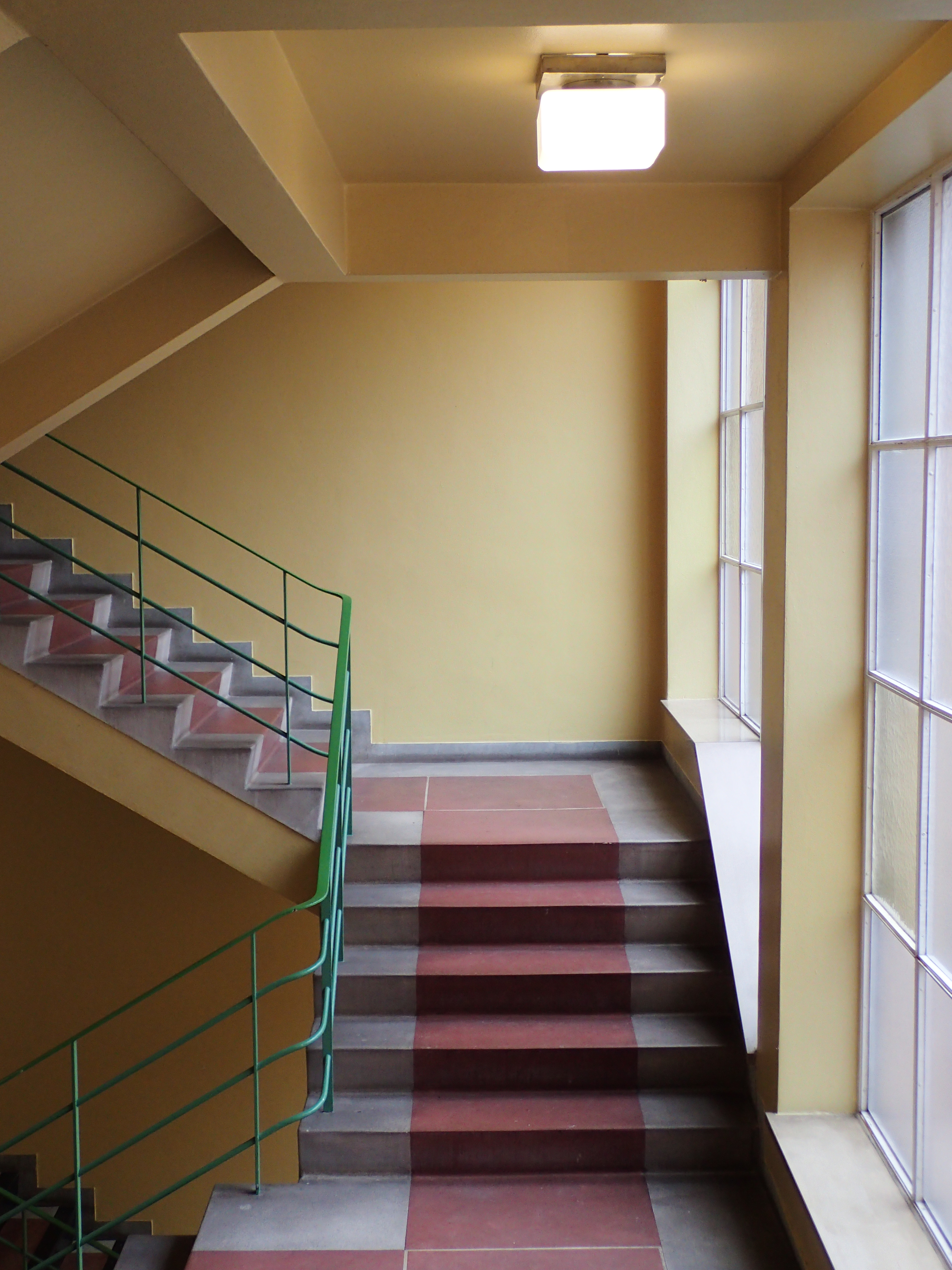
Entry stairwell, detail

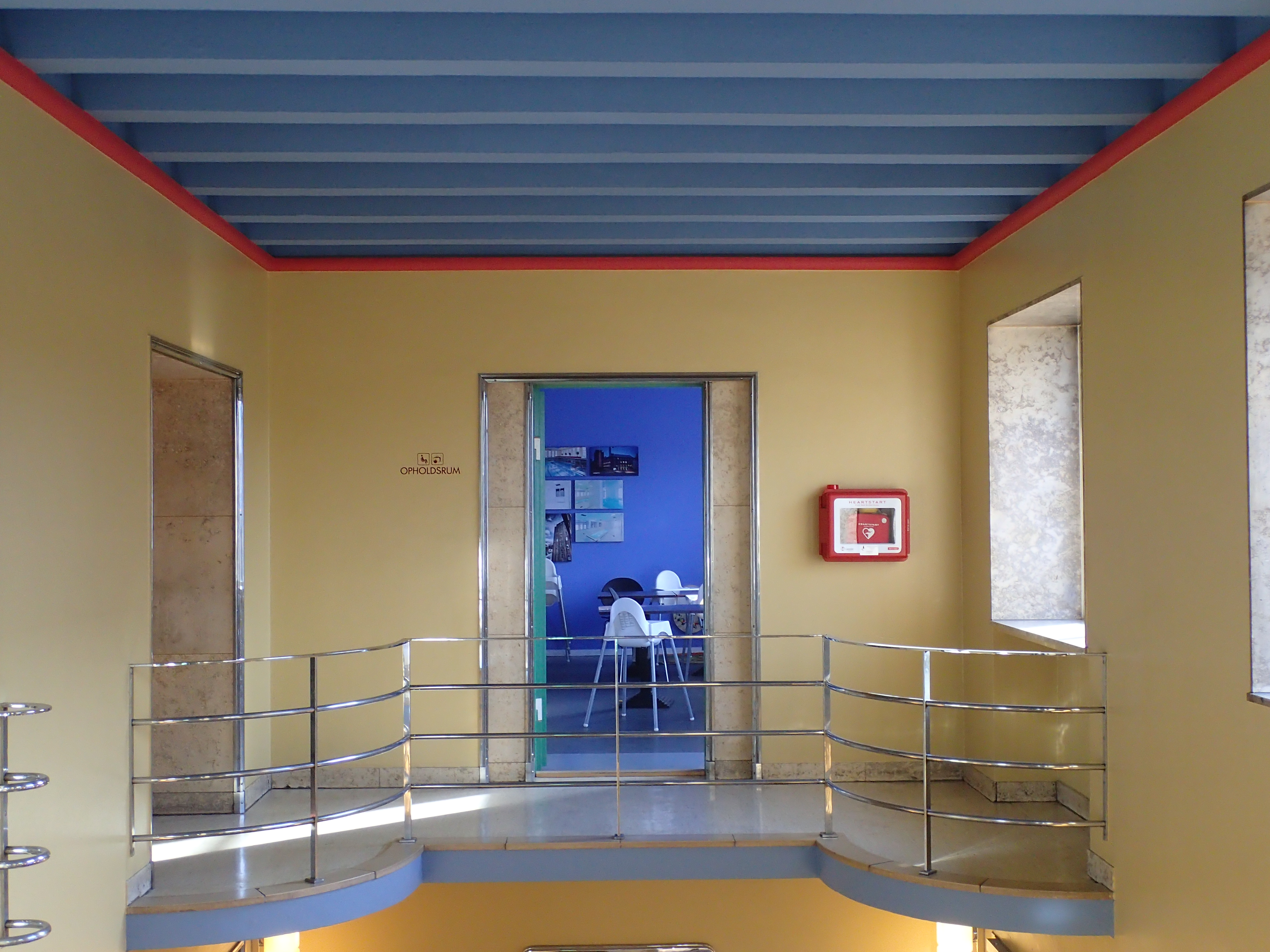
First floor details

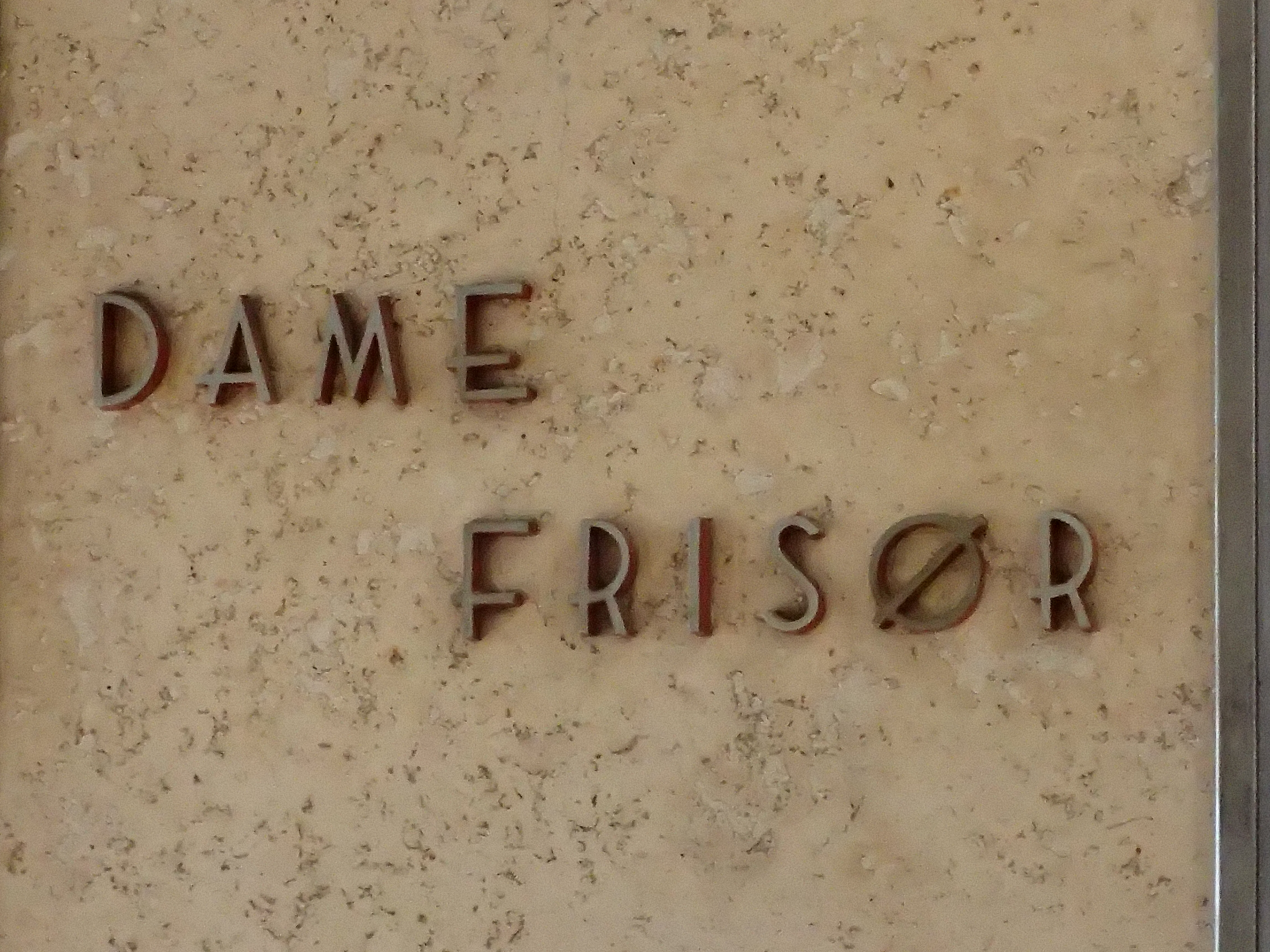
Detail. Hairdresser signage.

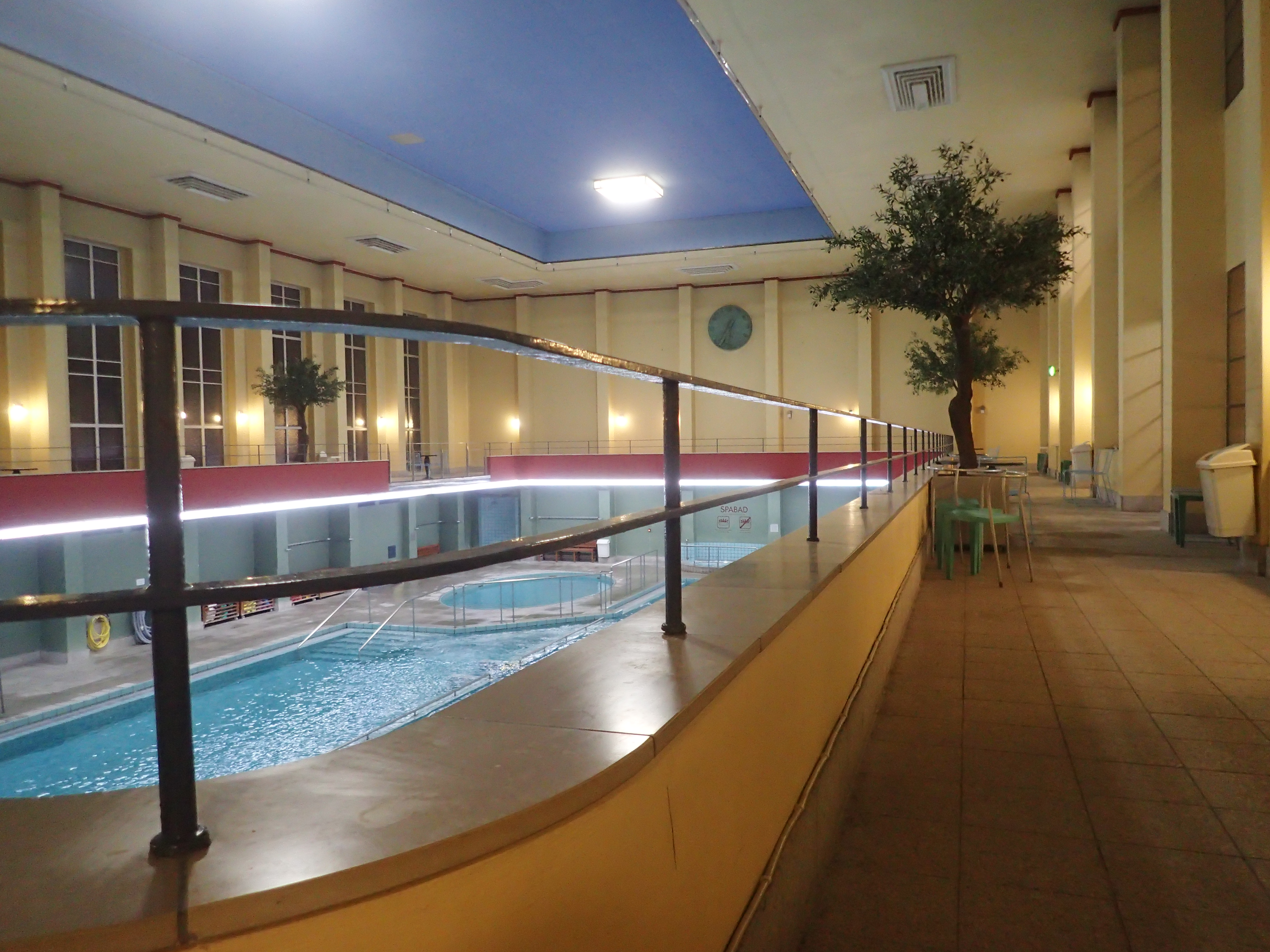
The swimming hall. From the 1st floor balcony.

== Facilities ==
The facilities were initially designed both to cater to the needs of the many working class citizens who lived without heated water and bathrooms in their city homes, and as a wellness facility for wealthier citizens. In modern times, there is no longer the same imminent need to cater for basic hygienic needs of the citizens so it was decided to repurpose larger parts of the interior in combination with a thorough renovation of the whole building. This project was realised between 2012 and 2014.

Today the swimminghall holds a 25 meter exercise and fitness pool, a play area, a shallow hot water pool, a spa and showers. The large changing room departments offers sauna. The 3rd floor contains a wellness unit with several special facilities, most notably sauna, an ice water pool, steam baths, spa baths and massage pools.

As originally, the complex is still home to a number of commercial leases and offers a small café, hairdresser, acupuncture, craniosacral therapy and zone therapy. The first floor and basement is home to a fitness club.

== See also ==
- Listed buildings in Aarhus Municipality
