= Malthe Conrad Lottrup =

Danish merchant, politician and brewer

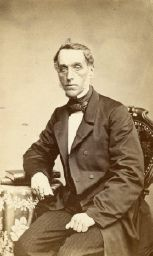
- Malthe Conrad Lottrup
- Born: 12 May 1815; Holmegaard, Denmark
- Died: 21 November 1870 (aged 55); Aarhus, Denmark

Malthe Conrad Lottrup (12 May 1815 – 21 November 1870) was a Danish merchant, politician and brewer.

== Biography ==
Malthe Conrad Lottrup was born on 12 May 1815 in Holmegaard, Skals Parish, Viborg County. His father was proprietor Ole Lottrup and his mother was Ingeborg Azor Jacobsen. Conrad Lottrup became one of the wealthiest Danes at his time; he co-founded and later owned the Ceres brewery which would exist for 150 years and he was active in philanthropy and local politics through the Aarhus city council and many local political organizations.

Conrad Lottrup was employed by the merchant N.H. Beck in his store in Vestergade until Beck died in 1843. He married Beck's widower Maren Wissing Beck (1801–1872), daughter of the priest Oluf Nielsen Bech and his wife Ane Mørch Galthen, and on 30 Jan 1844 took citizenship in Aarhus where he took over the store. Over the next decade Conrad Lottrup built many different businesses in imports, manufacturing and brewing. In 1857 he sold off the store and lumber yard to some of his business partners and focused on the steam distillery he owned in Vestergade. In 1856 he co-founded, with two business partners, the Ceres brewery which at the time was one of seven breweries in the city. The brewery became the first in Denmark to make Bavarian beer and it grew to become the largest in the city.

The factory soon expanded with large factory buildings outside Vesterport. In 1857 Conrad Lottrup bought the remaining shares of the brewery and became the sole owner. Lottrup was also active in politics. Between 20 January 1858 and 31 December 1867 he was a member of the Aarhus city council. In 1865 he sat on the Commission on Health and 1869 he was a member of the socialite club Polyhymnia.

== Death ==
Malthe Conrad Lottrup died on 21 November 1870, 55 years old, and was buried at Søndre Cemetery in Aarhus. His gravestone still stands in the City Hall Park.
