= Ceres Brewery =

Beer and soft drink facility in Århus, Denmark

Ceres Bryggeriet A/S
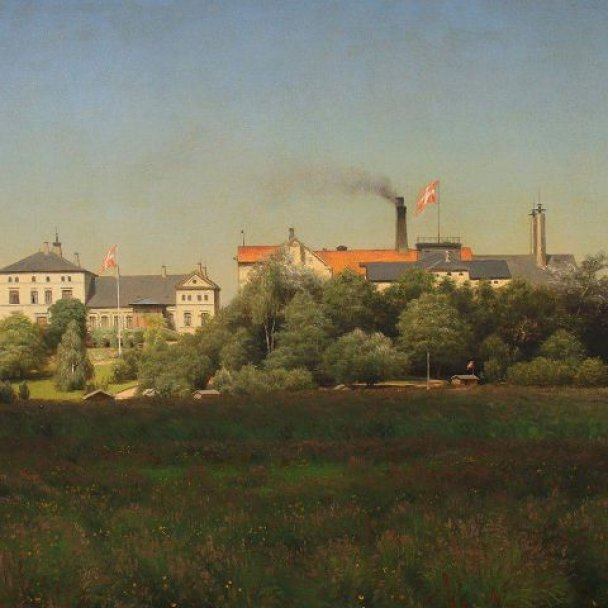
- Painting of the old Ceres breweries (1893)
- Industry: Alcoholic beverage
- Founded: 1856
- Founder: Malthe Conrad Lottrup
- Defunct: 2008
- Headquarters: Århus, Denmark
- Products: Beer
- Owner: Royal Unibrew

The Ceres Brewery was a beer and soft drink producing facility in Århus, Denmark, that operated from 1856 until 2008. Although the brewery was closed by its owner Royal Unibrew, the Ceres brand continues, with the product brewed at other facilities. The area where the brewery stood is being redeveloped for residential and commercial use and has been named CeresByen (Ceres City).

== History ==
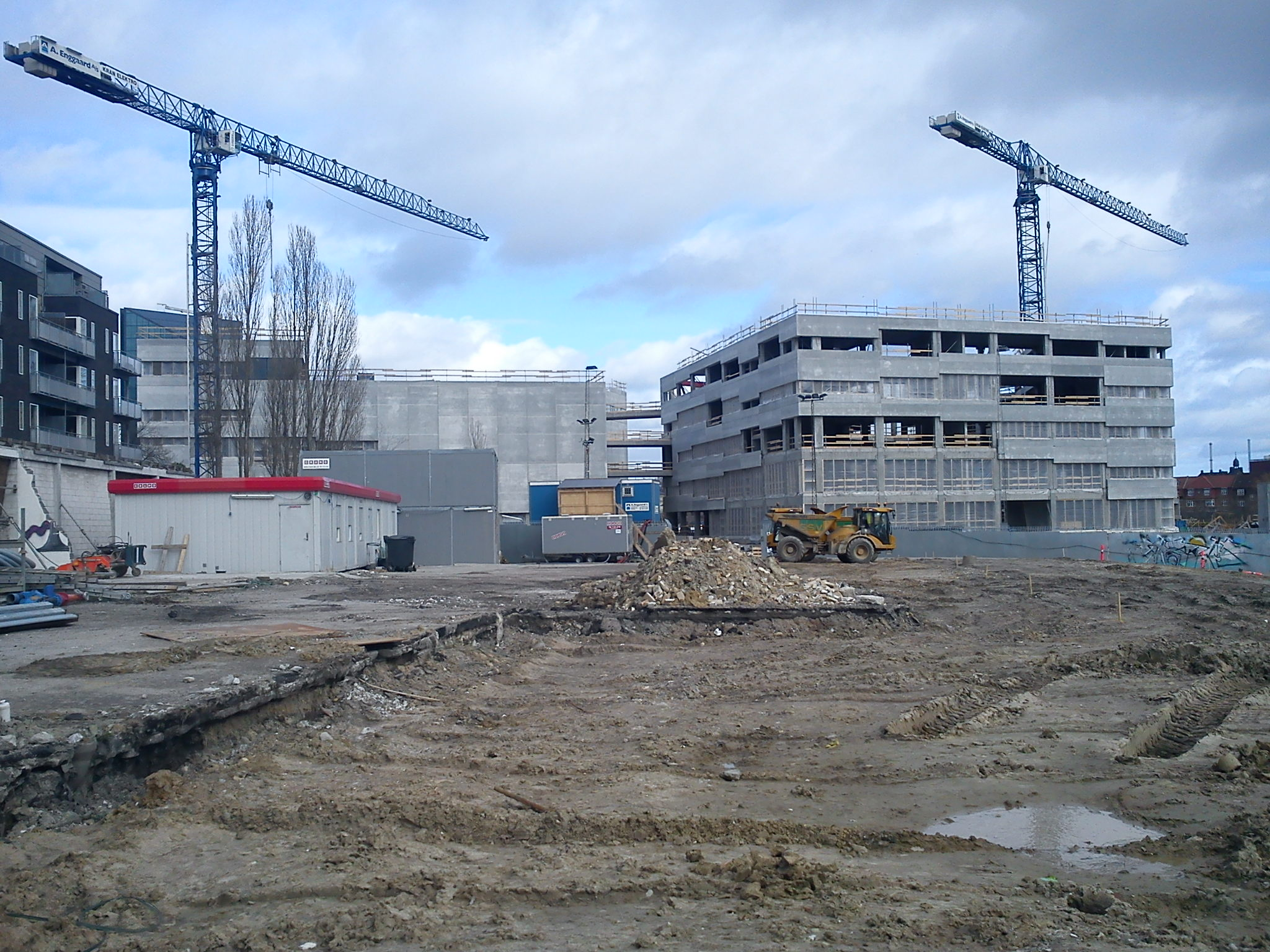
Redevelopment of the site of the former Ceres brewery in 2014

"Ceres Brewery" was founded in 1856 by Malthe Conrad Lottrup, a grocer, with chemists "A. S. Aagard" and "Knud Redelien", as the city's seventh brewery. It was named after the Roman goddess Ceres, and its opening was announced in the local newspaper, Århus Stiftstidende.

Lottrup expanded the brewery after ten years, adding a grand new building as his private residence.

He was succeeded by his son-in-law, Laurits Christian Meulengracht, who ran the brewery for almost thirty years, expanding it further before selling it to "Østjyske Bryggerier", another brewing firm.

The Ceres brewery was named an official purveyor to the "Royal Danish Court" in 1914.
