= Vestre Cemetery (Aarhus) =

Cemetery in Aarhus, Denmark

Vestre Kirkegård
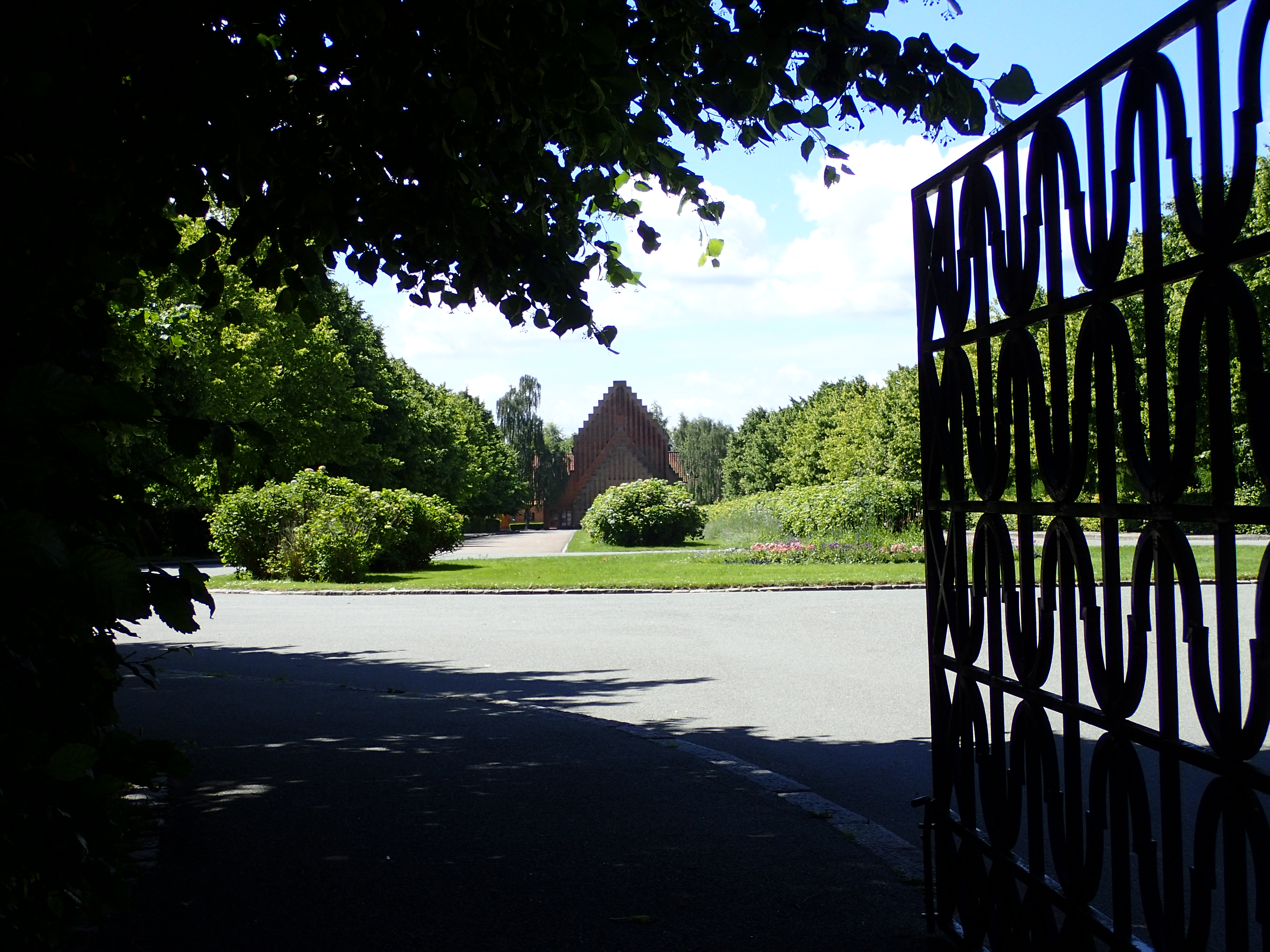
- Vestre Kirkegård in Aarhus
- Interactive map of Vestre Kirkegård

Details
- Established: 1927
- Location: Aarhus
- Country: Denmark
- Coordinates: 56°9′34.92″N 10°10′48.74″E
- Type: Public
- Owned by: Aarhus Municipality
- Size: 16.9 ha (42 acres)
- Website: Official website
- Find a Grave: Vestre Kirkegård

Vestre Kirkegård (Western Cemetery), established in 1927, is one of two large municipal cemeteries in Aarhus, Denmark with Nordre Kirkegård being the other. The cemetery was inaugurated in 1927 when Nordre Kirkegård was filled up. Originally, the cemetery was 5 hectares, but it has been expanded several times, until its present size of 16.9 hectares.

Vestre Kirkegård contains two chapels. Store Kapel (Big Chapel) by Frederik Draiby originates from the opening of the cemetery and contains 252 seats. The other, Lille Kapel (Little Chapel) designed by Henning Larsen is from 1969 and contains 50 seats. Lille Kapel in addition features a crematorium. Henry From and Christian Frederik Møller is interred in Vestre Kirkegård.

== World War II ==
The second world war left a notable impact on Vestre Kirkegård. There are 17 protected graves belonging to resistance fighters who died in the Neuengamme concentration camp and a memorial wall has been erected by Aarhus Municipality to commemorate 15 of its citizens that died in German concentration camps and were buried elsewhere. There is a grave site and memorial for 13 victims of a 1944 explosion in Aarhus harbor who could not be identified. Finally there is a memorial for two Soviet prisoners, grave site and memorial for 11 British soldiers, grave site for 299 German soldiers who died in 1945 and a grave site for 619 German refugees that died in 1945.

== Notable interments ==
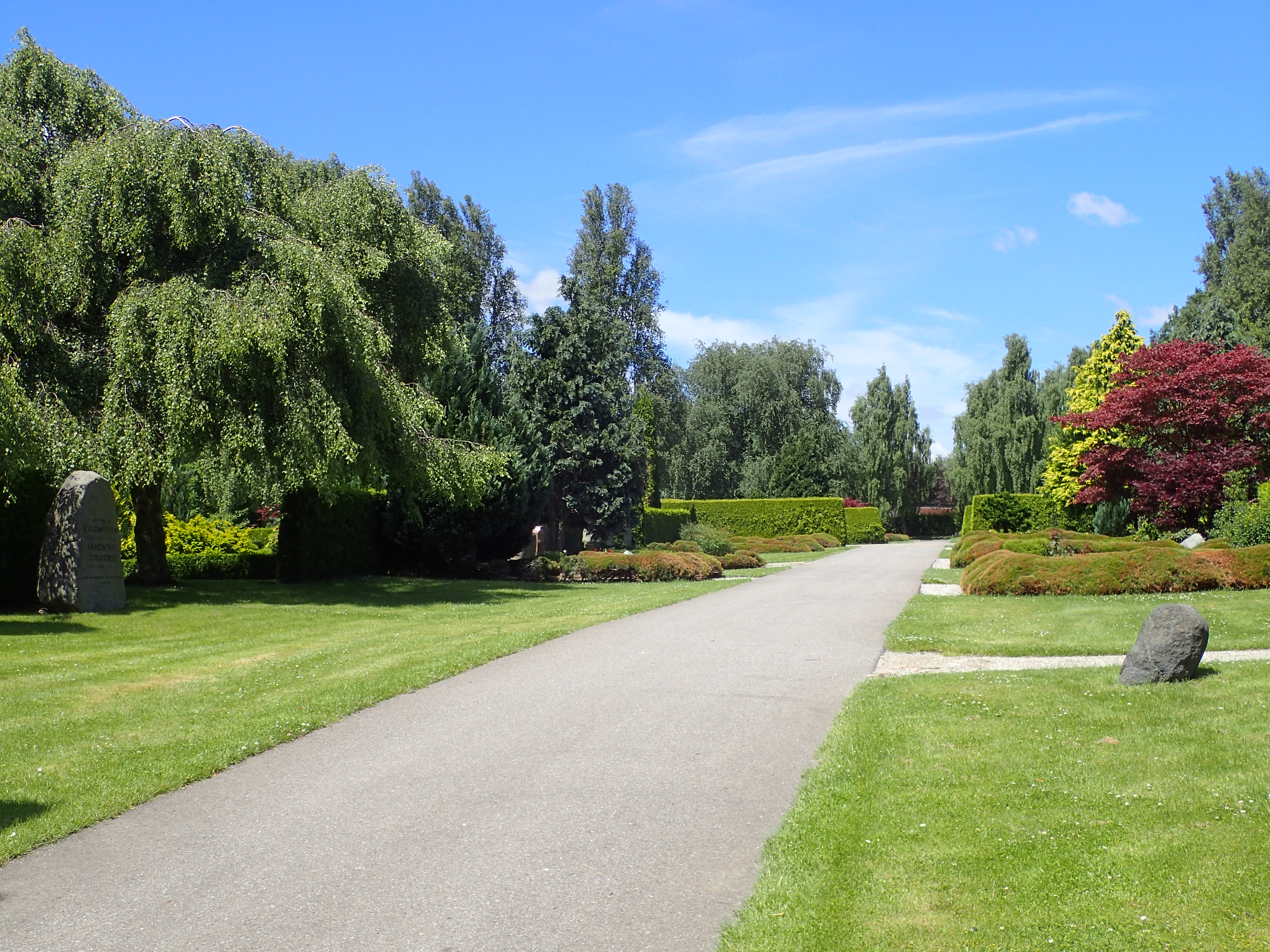
The gravefields. Former mayor H.P. Christensen and his wife are buried at the birch tree on the left.

- Hans Peder Christensen, mayor of Aarhus (1933–1941)
- Henry From, footballer (1926–1990)
- Olaf Jonas Hansen, writer and teacher (1870–1932)
- Orla Hyllested, mayor of Aarhus (1971–1981)
- C. F. Møller, architect and teacher (1898–1988)
- Harald Salling-Mortensen, architect (1902–1969)
- Tage Skou-Hansen, writer (1925–2015)
- Einar Stecher Christensen, mayor of Aarhus (1942–1945)
