= Otto Mønsted =

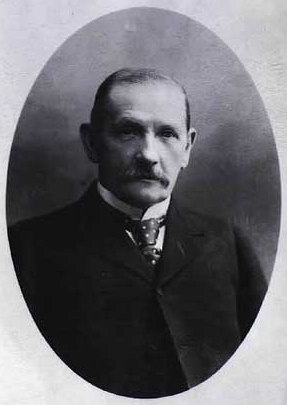
Otto Mønsted

Rasmus Otto Mønsted (23 November 1838 - 4 September 1916) was an industrialist and margarine manufacturer from Denmark.

Born at the rural family manor of Lyngsbækgård on Mols near Ebeltoft, Otto Mønsted became a wholesaler of butter, grain and feed in the town of Aarhus in 1865 after some trading experience in Grenå, Roskilde and Copenhagen. In 1876, he founded a large business exporting butter in hermetically sealed containers to places like England, China and Africa. Although the butter company was successful, he diversified into manufacturing margarine, and in 1883 opened the first margarine factory in Denmark. He followed five years later with a factory in Godley, near Manchester, England, and in 1894 he built a vast margarine works in Southall, London. Mønsteds butter company was renamed to Otto Mønsted Aarhus in 1909 - usually just shortened to OMA - and the OMA margarine brand became very familiar in Denmark, as he introduced innovative marketing techniques for his time. He also tried to gain a foothold on the Russian market with margarine, but lost a great deal of money as a consequence of World War I and the Russian Revolution.

In Aarhus, he was very active in the city's economic life and was a member of the city council from 1885 to 1891. He led the establishing of the first local telephone company of Århus Telefonselskab and donated a large sum of money to the establishment of Aarhus Theatre and financed the interior artistic decorations as well.

Mønsteds' contributions was not limited to the town of Aarhus though and he was made a Knight of the Dannebrog. He built himself a villa in 1896-97, Kristianiagade 5 in Copenhagen, designed by the architect Vilhelm Dahlerup. The building is now the Russian Embassy. When Mønsted died, he was one of Denmark's richest men. The Otto Mønsted Foundation was created, which contributes to the development of the Danish business community. In 1956, the Otto Mønsteds College in Valby was endowed. The factories and production of OMA existed until 1981 when the brand was sold to Unilever. Since then, Otto Mønsted A/S has been an investment company, and the dividends from this are the basis for the Otto Mønsted Foundation's distributions. OMA remains a popular brand in Denmark, now being distributed by Flora Food Denmark A/S in Herlev.

== Sources ==
- Jesper Strandskov, Peter Sørensen & Kurt Pedersen, Otto Mønsted : sig navnet -, Systime, 1998. ISBN 87-616-0024-5 (in Danish)
- Jesper Strandskov, et al.: "Otto Mønsted and the early margarine industry: alliance capitalism a century ago". The Scandinavian economic history review, Vol. 48, nr. 3 (2000) 0358-5522, p. 57-71
- Danmarkshistorien.dk: Otto Mønsted (1839-1916) Aarhus University (in Danish)
- Aarhus Municipality: "Rasmus Otto Mønsted" Mayors department (30 August 2012) (in Danish)
