= Schröder =

Schröder (Schroeder) is a German surname often associated with the Schröder family. Notable people with the surname include:

- Anna-Konstanze Schröder (born 1980), German politician
- Arthur Schröder (1892–1986), German actor
- Atze Schröder, stage name of German comedian Hubertus Albers
- Bernd Schröder (born 1942), German football manager
- Björn Schröder (born 1968), German and Swiss curler and coach
- Björn Schröder (born 1980), German cyclist
- Bob Schroder (born 1944), American baseball player
- Brigitte Schröder (1917–2000), German politician
- Carly Schroeder (born 1990), American actress
- Christa Schroeder (1908–1984), Adolf Hitler's personal secretary
- Christian Mathias Schröder (1778–1860), German politician
- Corina Schröder (born 1986), German footballer
- Dennis Schröder (born 1993), German basketball player
- Diana Schröder (born 1975), German artistic gymnast
- Dominik Schröder (1910–1974), German ethnologist
- Doris Schröder-Köpf (born 1963), German journalist
- Edward Schröder (1858–1942), German Germanist and mediaevalist
- Ernst Schröder (1841–1902), German logician and mathematician
- Flora-Elisa Schröder (born 1988), German politician
- Florian Schröder (born 1975), German politician
- Frank Schröder (born 1962), East German skier
- Friedrich Schröder (1910–1972), German composer
- Friedrich Ludwig Schröder (1744–1816), German actor
- F.W. Schröder-Schrom (1879–1956), German actor
- Gerhard Schröder (disambiguation)
  - Gerhard Schröder (1910–1989), German politician
  - Gerhard Schröder (1921–2012), German radio and television executive
  - Gerhard Schröder (born 1944), German politician, Chancellor of Germany
- Gerco Schröder (born 1978), Dutch show jumping equestrian
- Greta Schröder (1892–1967), German actress
- Gustav Schröder (1885–1959), German sea captain who in 1939 attempted to save 937 German Jewish passengers on his ship, MS St. Louis, from the Nazis
- Gustaviana Schröder (1701–1763) Swedish singer
- Han Schröder (1918–1992), Dutch architect
- Hans Schröder (disambiguation)
  - Hans Schröder (1906–1970), German international footballer
  - Hans Schröder (1931–2010), German sculptor and painter
- Harold M. Schroder (1923-2013), American professor of psychology
- Heinrich G. F. Schröder (1810–1885), German natural scientist
- Horst Schröder (1938–2022), German politician
- Iwona Karolewska (née Schröder; born 1974), Polish politician and civil servant
- Jaap Schröder (1925–2020), Dutch violinist
- Jan Schröder (1941–2007), Dutch cyclist
- Jan-Christian Schröder (born 1998), German chess grandmaster
- Johann Heinrich Schröder (1784–1883), German-British banker
- Johannes Schröder (born 1991), German organist, composer and Catholic church musician
- John Schroder (born 1961), American businessman
- Jürgen Schröder (disambiguation)
  - Jürgen Schröder (born 1940), German politician (CDU)
  - Jürgen Schröder (born 1940), German rower
  - Jürgen Schröder (born 1960), German water polo player
- Karl Schröder (disambiguation)
  - Karl Schröder I (1816–1890), German violinist
  - Karl Schröder II (1848–1935), German cellist, composer and conductor
  - Karl Schröder (1884–1950), German communist politician
  - Karl Schröder, West German canoeist
  - Karl Ludwig Schröder, (1877–1940) German screenwriter, director, agent
- Katrin Schröder (born 1967), East German rower
- Kristina Schröder (born Köhler 1977), German politician
- Kurt Schröder (1888–1962), German composer
- Magdalena Schröder (born 1990), Swedish politician
- Marianne Schroeder (born 1949), Swiss pianist and composer
- Marianne Schröder (born 1977), Norwegian model
- Marianne Schröder (chess player) (1937–1970), German chess master
- Marie Schröder (1845–1917, Marie Hanfstängl), German singer
- Martin Schröder (disambiguation)
  - Martin Schröder (born 1931), Dutch pilot and businessman
  - Martin Schröder (born 1954), British chemist
- Matthias Schröder, German Paralympic athlete
- Michael Schröder (born 1959), German footballer
- Nic Schröder (born 1980), Swedish singer and actor
- Ole Schröder (born 1971), German politician
- Otto Schröder (Assyriologist) (1887–1928), German Ancient Near East scholar, primarily Assyriologist
- Otto Schröder (fencer) (1902–1975), German fencer
- Rainer M. Schröder (born 1951), German novelist
- Rayk Schröder (born 1974), German footballer
- Richard Schröder (1921–20??), Nazi German military officer
- Richard Schroeder (born 1961), American swimmer
- Ricky Schroder (born 1970), American actor
- Rudolf Alexander Schröder (1878–1962), German poet
- Simone Schröder (born 1964), German contralto and academic teacher
- Sophia Schröder (1712–1750), Swedish singer
- Sophie Schröder (1781–1868), German actress
- Soren Schroder, American businessman, CEO of Bunge Limited
- Stefan Schröder (born 1983), German politician
- Thomas Schröder (born 1961), East German sprinter
- Thomas D. Schroeder (born 1959), American lawyer
- Truus Schröder-Schräder (1889–1985), Dutch socialite
- Ursula Schröder-Feinen (1936–2005), German singer
- Walther Schröder (1902–1973), German politician
- Wilfrid Schroder (1946–2013), Associate Justice of the Kentucky Supreme Court
- Wilhelm Schröder (1896–1979), German military officer
- Wilhelmine Schröder-Devrient (1804–1860), German singer
- Wilhelmine Schröder, (1839–1924), Swedish writer
- Willi Schröder (1928–1999), German footballer
- Willy Schröder (1912–1990), German discus thrower
- Wim Schröder (born 1971), Dutch show jumping equestrian

== Fictional characters ==
- Colonel Schröder from The Good Soldier Švejk
