= Schreder =

Schreder or Schréder is a surname. Notable people with this name include:

- Ariane Schréder, French writer
- Ernst Schreder (1892–1941), German general during the Second World War
- Richard Schreder (1915–2002), American naval aviator and sailplane developer

== See also ==
- Schrader
- Schraeder
- Schreider
- Schreuder
- Schroeder
- Schroedter
- Schröder
- Schrøder
