= Hans Schröder =

Hans Schröder may refer to:

- Hans Schröder (footballer) (1906–1970), German international footballer
- Hans Schröder (artist) (1931–2010), German sculptor and painter

== See also ==
- Schröder
- Han Schröder (1918–1992), Dutch architect and educator
- Hans Schrader (1869–1948), German archaeologist and art historian
- Johann Samuel Schroeter (1753–1788), German pianist and composer
- Johann Samuel Schröter (1735–1808), German pastor, conchologist, mineralogist and palaeontologist
- Johann Hieronymus Schröter (1745–1816), German astronomer
- Hans Wilhelm Schrøder (24 June 1810 – 14 April 1888), Danish architect
