= Schroder (disambiguation) =

Schroder may refer to:

- Schröder, German surname
- Schrøder, Danish surname
- C. M. Schröder, Russian piano company
- FV J. F. Schröder, German ship
- Restaurant Schrøder

== See also ==
- Schroeder
- Shroder
- Schroders
