= Carl Schroeder =

Carl Schroeder may refer to:

- Karl Schröder II (1848–1935), or Carl Schroeder, German cellist, composer, and conductor
- Carl Schroeder (composer), American composer
- Carl Schroeder (pianist), American pianist

== See also ==
- Carly Schroeder (born 1990), American actress and Army officer
