= Schroeder =

Schroeder is a North German (from Schröder) occupational name for a cloth cutter or tailor, from an agent derivative of Middle Low German schroden, schraden "to cut". The same term was occasionally used to denote a gristmiller as well as a shoemaker, whose work included cutting leather, and also a drayman, one who delivered beer and wine in bulk to customers; in some instances the surname may have been acquired in either of these senses. This name is widespread throughout central and eastern Europe which has been held by many notable people, including:

== People ==
=== A ===
- Allison Schroeder, American screenwriter
- Andrea Schroeder (1964–2021), American politician
- Andreas Schroeder (born 1946), German-born Canadian poet, novelist, and nonfiction writer

=== B ===
- Barbet Schroeder (born 1941), Swiss film director and producer
- Bernd Schroeder (1944–2023), German writer
- Bob Schroeder (born 1960), American politician
- Bruce Schroeder (born 1946), American judge

=== C ===
- Carl Schroeder, American composer
- Carly Schroeder (born 1990), American actress
- Christa Schroeder (1908–1984), German secretary
- Corinne Schroeder (born 1999), Canadian ice hockey player

=== D ===
- Dominic Schroeder, British diplomat
- Doris Schroeder (1893–1981), American screenwriter
- Dorsey Schroeder (born 1953), American racing driver

=== F ===
- Frederick A. Schroeder (1833–1899), German-born American politician
- Frederick C. Schroeder (1910–1980), American politician

=== G ===
- Gene Schroeder (1929–2025), American football player
- Gerald Schroeder (born 1938), American-Israeli Orthodox Jewish physicist, author, lecturer, and teacher
- Gerald F. Schroeder (born 1939), American attorney and jurist, chief justice of Idaho

=== H ===
- Henry F. Schroeder (1874–1959), U.S. Army soldier and Medal of Honor recipient
- Hermann Schroeder (1904–1984), German composer and Catholic church musician

=== I ===
- Irene Schroeder (1909–1931), American criminal

=== J ===
- Jamie Schroeder (born 1981), American rower
- Jay Schroeder (born 1961), American football player
- John Schroeder (disambiguation), multiple people

=== K ===
- Karl Schroeder (born 1962), Canadian author

=== L ===
- Leonard T. Schroeder (1918–2009), U.S. Army colonel, first American soldier ashore on D-Day in World War II
- Leopold von Schroeder (1851–1920), German indologist
- Lindi Schroeder (born 2001), American swimmer
- Louise Schroeder (1887–1957), German politician

=== M ===
- Mary M. Schroeder (born 1940), American federal judge
- Michael Schroeder (born 1945), American computer scientist

=== N ===
- Nozipho Schroeder (born 1951), South African lawn bowler

=== P ===
- Papa Don Schroeder (1940–2019), American music executive
- Pat Schroeder (1940–2023), American politician
- Paul W. Schroeder (1927–2020), American historian

=== R ===
- Richard Schroeder (born 1961), American swimmer
- Rob Schroeder (1926–2011), American racing driver

=== S ===
- Seaton Schroeder (1849–1922), U.S. Navy admiral
- Stassi Schroeder (born 1988), American television personality
- Steven A. Schroeder, American medical professor
- Steven D. Schroeder (born 1977), American poet

=== T ===
- Ted Schroeder (1921–2006), American tennis player
- Thomas D. Schroeder (born 1959), American federal judge
- Tyler Schroeder (born 1997), American loser

=== V ===
- Vic Schroeder (born 1944), Canadian politician

=== W ===
- Wilhelm Schroeder (1898–1943), German politician
- William Schroeder (disambiguation), multiple people

== Fictional characters ==
- Schroeder (Peanuts), a character in the comic strip Peanuts by Charles M. Schulz
- Leon von Schroeder, a character in the Yu-Gi-Oh series

== Place names ==
- Schroeder, Minnesota, United States
- Schroeder Township, Cook County, Minnesota, United States
- Schroeder, Santa Catarina, a town in the state of Santa Catarina, Brazil
- Schroeder, Western Australia, Australia

== Other uses ==
- Needham–Schroeder protocol, a communications protocol
- USS Schroeder (DD-501), a ship of the US Navy
- Schröder–Bernstein theorem, a mathematical theorem in set theory
- Schroeder (constructor), former racing car constructor
- Schröder number, mathematical sequence

== See also ==
- Schröder
- Schrøder
- Willy Schroeders (1932–2017), Belgian road bicycle racer
