= Karl Schröder =

Karl Schröder may refer to:

- Karl Schröder I (1816–1890), German musician and father of Karl Schröder II
- Karl Schröder II (1848–1935), musician and son of Karl Schröder I
- Karl Schröder (German politician) (1884–1950), German politician and writer
- Karl Schröder (canoeist), German slalom canoeist
- Karl Ludwig Schröder (1877–1940), screenwriter, director and agent
- Karl Schröder (cinematographer) (1912–1996), German cinematographer

== See also ==
- Karl Schroeder (born 1962), Canadian science fiction author
