= Schreuders =

Schreuders is a Dutch occupational surname. See "Schreuder" for its origin. Notable people with the surname include:

- Claudette Schreuders, South African sculptor and painter
- Mikel Schreuders, Aruban swimmer

== See also ==
- Schreuder
