= String Quartet in B-flat major (Sibelius) =

String quartet by Jean Sibelius (1890)

String Quartet in B♭ major
- by Jean Sibelius
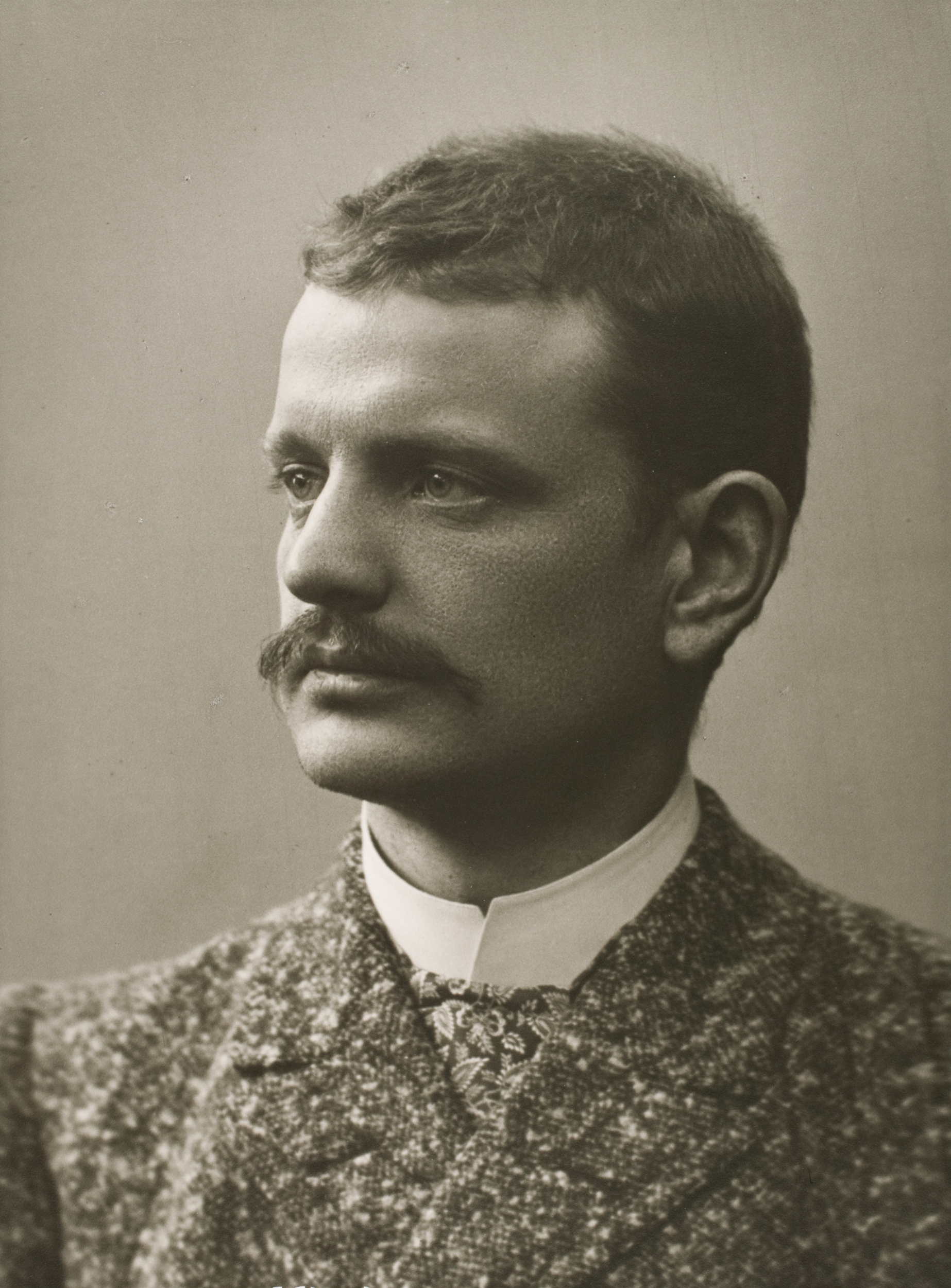
- The composer (c. 1891)
- Opus: 4
- Composed: 1889–1890
- Publisher: Fazer (1991)
- Duration: 31.5 mins.
- Movements: Four

Premiere
- Date: 13 October 1890
- Location: Helsinki, Grand Duchy of Finland
- Performers: Johan Halvorsen (violin); Wilhelm Santé (violin); Josef Schwartz (viola); Otto Hutschenreuter (cello)

The String Quartet in B♭ major, Op. 4, is a four-movement chamber piece for two violins, viola, and cello written from the summer of 1889 to September 1890 by the Finnish composer Jean Sibelius. It is the third of Sibelius's four string quartets. Musicologists have speculated: first, that the Adagio in D minor (JS 12) may have been intended as a slow movement for the Op. 4 quartet; and second, that the Allegretto in B♭ major (without catalogue designation) may be an abandoned sketch.

Sibelius began composing the piece before attending a course in Berlin with Albert Becker. The regime at the Berlin training institute was much stricter than that in Helsinki, to which he was accustomed. As a result, this composition was not completed until his return to Loviisa, Finland (September 1890) after the course. It seems the Berlin course had little influence on his composition. The work appears to be a continuation of his Adagio in D minor, which he composed shortly after his return from Berlin. The quartet includes a passage in which Sibelius specifies pizzicato, a technique he later used extensively in his Second Symphony.

The B♭ major Quartet received its premiere in Helsinki on 13 October 1890 at the Helsinki Music Institute (now the Sibelius Academy); the Norwegian composer Johan Halvorsen was the first violinist, joined by Wilhelm Santé (violin II), Josef Schwartz (viola), and Otto Hutschenreuter (cello).

In February 1894, Sibelius arranged Movement III for strings and titled it Presto (also known as Scherzo). This version received its premiere on 17 February 1894 in Turku, with Sibelius conducting the Orchestra of the Turku Musical Society.

== Structure ==
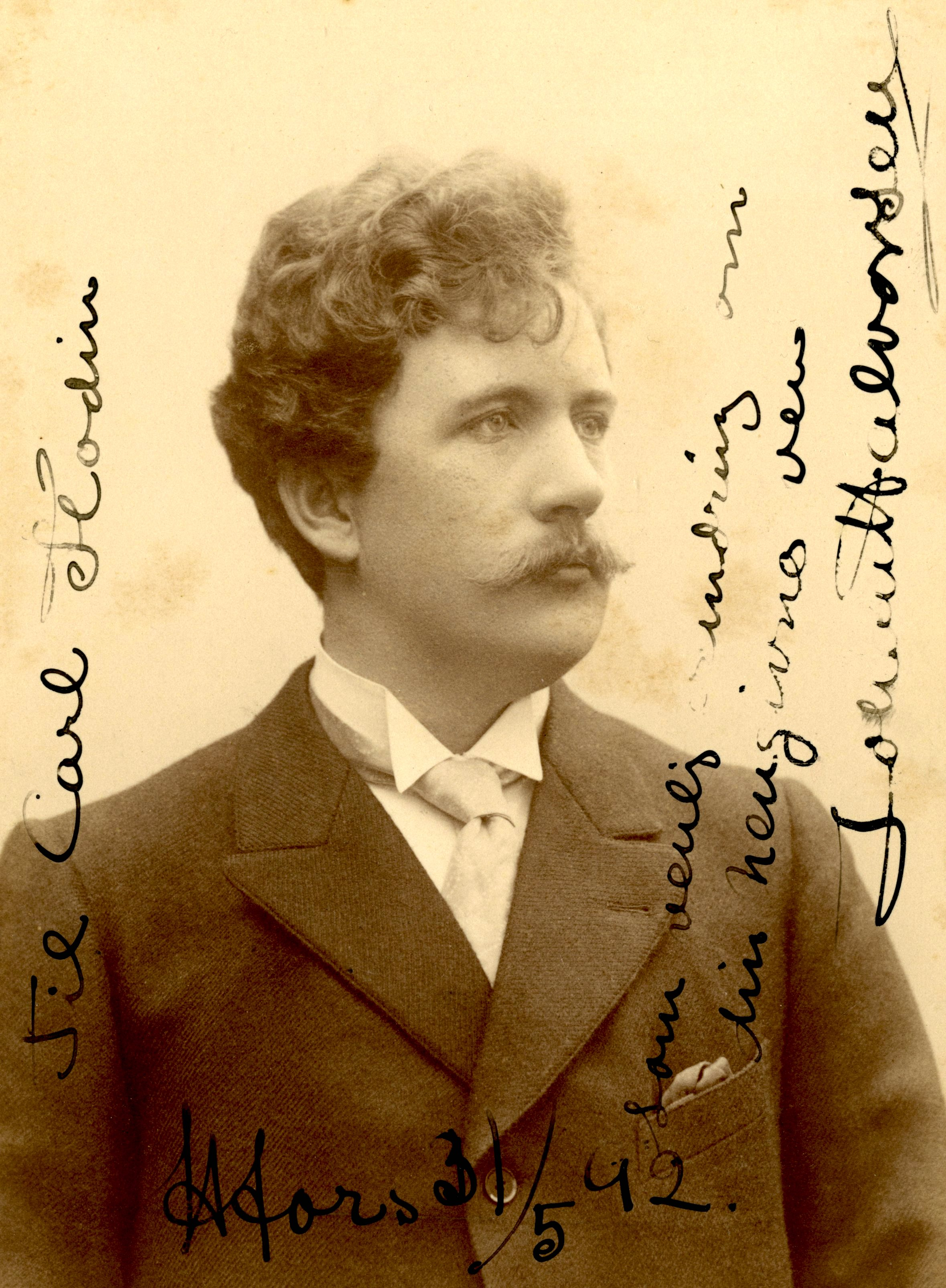
The Norwegian composer Johan Halvorsen played first violin at the premiere.

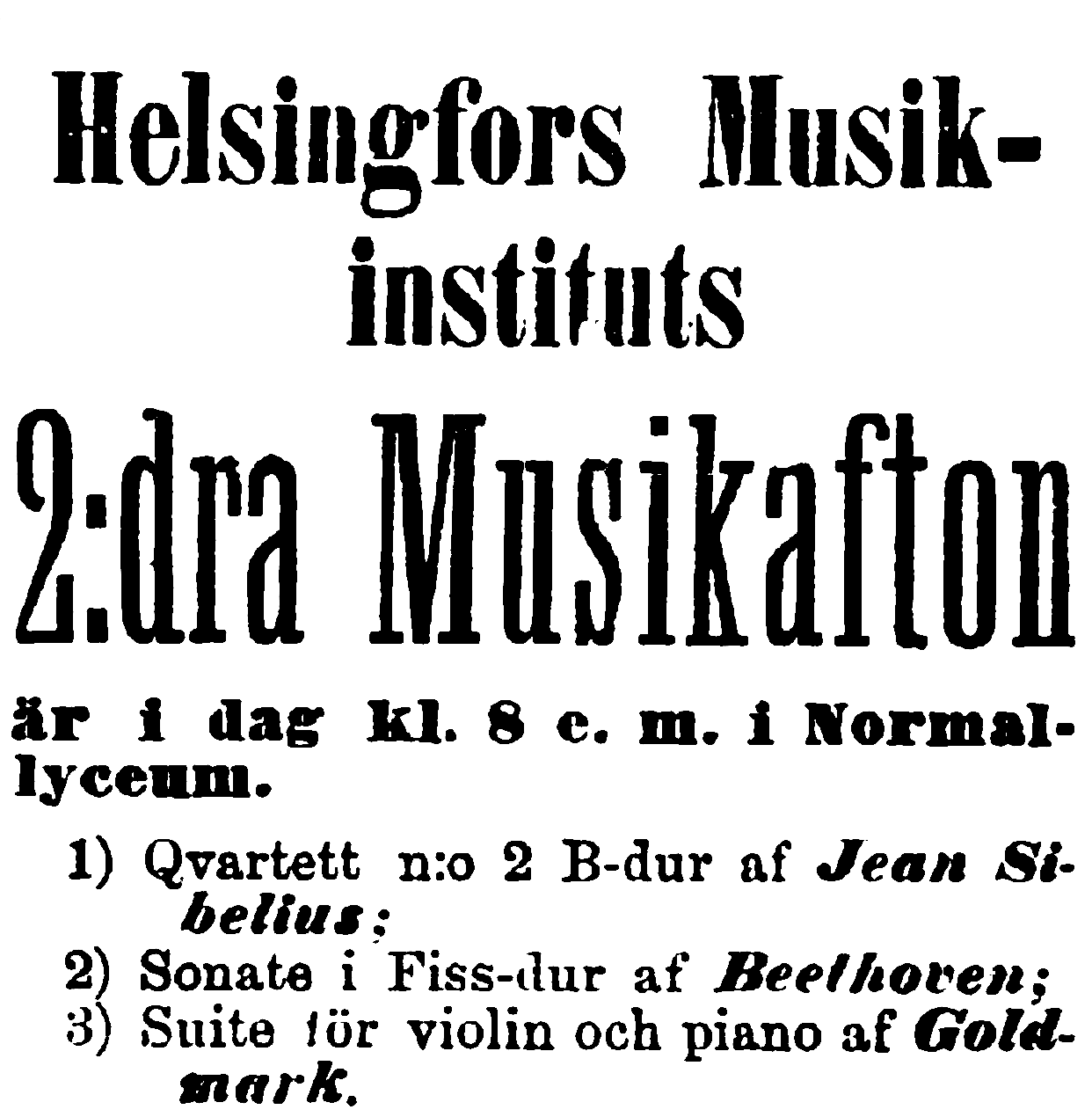
An 13 October 1890 ad promoting the premiere of Sibelius's B-flat major Quartet

The quartet is in four movements:

1. Allegro
2. Andante molto
3. Presto
4. Allegro

The piece was published posthumously in 1991 by Fazer Music.

The first movement, marked Allegro, is in 2/2 time; it has a duration of about nine minutes.

The second movement, marked Andante molto, is in 2/4 time; it has a duration of about 7.5 minutes.

The third movement, marked Presto, is in 3/4 time; it has a duration of about six minutes.

The fourth movement, marked Allegro, is in 4/4 time; it has a duration of about nine minutes.

== Discography ==
The Sibelius Academy Quartet made the world premiere studio recording of the B♭ major Quartet for Finlandia in 1985. The table below lists this and other commercially available recordings:

No.	Quartet	Violin I	Violin II	Viola	Cello	Runtime (Note: All runtimes are official, as printed on CD or LP liner notes.)	Rec. (Note: Refers to the year in which the performers recorded the work; this may not be the same as the year in which the recording was first released to the general public.)	Recording venue	Label	Ref.
1	Sibelius Academy	Seppo Tukiainen	Erkki Kantola	Veikko Kosonen	Arto Noras	31:28	1984	Convent Church, Naantali	Finlandia	(Note: Name Quartet–Label (4509–95851–2) 1992)
2	Tempera	Laura Vikman	Silva Koskela	Tiila Kangas	Ulla Lampela	29:42	2004	Länna Church, Uppland	BIS	(Note: Tempera–BIS (CD–1466) 2007)

The Finnish conductor Pekka Helasvuo and the Finlandia Sinfonietta made the world premiere studio recording of Presto in 1985 for Finlandia. (Note: The musicologist Fabian Dahlström, in his 2003 catalogue of Sibelius's works, credits the Estonian-American conductor Neeme Järvi and the Gothenburg Symphony Orchestra with the world premiere studio recording of Presto. However, according to liner notes, this recording was made in 1987 for BIS, about two years after the 1985 recording by Helasvuo and the Finlandia Sinfonietta.) The table below lists this and other commercially available recordings:

No.	Conductor	Ensemble	Rec. (Note: Refers to the year in which the performers recorded the work; this may not be the same as the year in which the recording was first released to the general public.)	Time	Recording venue	Label	Ref.
1	Pekka Helasvuo	Finlandia Sinfonietta	1985	6:41	Laurentius Hall	Finlandia	(Note: P. Helasvuo–Finlandia (FACD 354) 1986)
2	Neeme Järvi	Gothenburg Symphony Orchestra	1987	6:41	Gothenburg Concert Hall	BIS	(Note: N. Järvi–BIS (CD–384) 1987)
3	Juha Kangas (1)	Ostrobothnian Chamber Orchestra (1)	1994	6:00	Kaustinen Church	Finlandia	(Note: J. Kangas–Finlandia (4509–98995–2) 1996)
4	Osmo Vänskä	Lahti Symphony Orchestra	2004	6:45	Sibelius Hall	BIS	(Note: O. Vänskä–BIS (CD–1485) 2006)
5	Juha Kangas (2)	Ostrobothnian Chamber Orchestra (2)	2011	5:57	Snellman Hall, Kokkola	Alba	(Note: J. Kangas–Alba (ABCD 344) 2012)

== Notes, references, and sources ==
Notes

Sources

- Barnett, Andrew (2007). Sibelius. New Haven: Yale University Press. ISBN 978-0-300-11159-0.
- Dahlström, Fabian [in Swedish] (2003). Jean Sibelius: Thematisch-bibliographisches Verzeichnis seiner Werke [Jean Sibelius: A Thematic Bibliographic Index of His Works] (in German). Wiesbaden: Breitkopf & Härtel. ISBN 3-7651-0333-0.
