= Otto Hutschenreuter =

German cellist

Otto August Ferdinand Hutschenreuter (24 April 1862 – 9 October 1944) was a German cellist and music teacher.

== Life ==
The son of a merchant, Otto Hutschenreuter was born in Königssee and studied piano from the age of five, then switched to the cello. From 1881 to 1883, he studied at the Leipzig Conservatory with Karl, then Alwin Schröder, and Julius Klengel. From 1883 to 1884, he completed his studies in Berlin under Louis Lübeck.

From 1885 to 1892, he worked in Helsinki as a soloist with the Helsinki Orchestral Society. On 5 May 1890, he participated in the premiere of Jean Sibelius's Piano Quintet (with Ferruccio Busoni, Johan Halvorsen, Karl Fredrik Wasenius, and violist Josef Schwarz). He also taught in Helsinki, where his students included Georg Schneevoigt and Ossian Foström.

Returning to Germany, he spent a year developing his skills as a soloist and ensemble player in Berlin with Robert Hausmann and Joseph Joachim. From 1893 to 1894, he taught at the Stern Conservatory. From 1895 to 1898, he was a soloist with the orchestra in Homburg. He then returned to Helsinki and afterwards to Berlin. He was one of the co-founders of the Berlin Chamber Music Society and, for a time, directed the Schwanzer Conservatory (several years after the death of its founder, Hugo Schwanzer). From 1903, he directed the youth orchestra in Charlottenburg and then in Berlin. In 1906, he became director of the Western Conservatory (Konservatorium des Westens), which had existed before the outbreak of World War I and had been founded a decade earlier by Hermann Gens. At the same time, he continued to give concerts in Berlin as an ensemble player.

In the postwar years, he was the music director of the town of Woltersdorf, Brandenburg; he died there on 9 October 1944.
