= Mindegade, Aarhus =

Street in Aarhus, Denmark

Mindegade
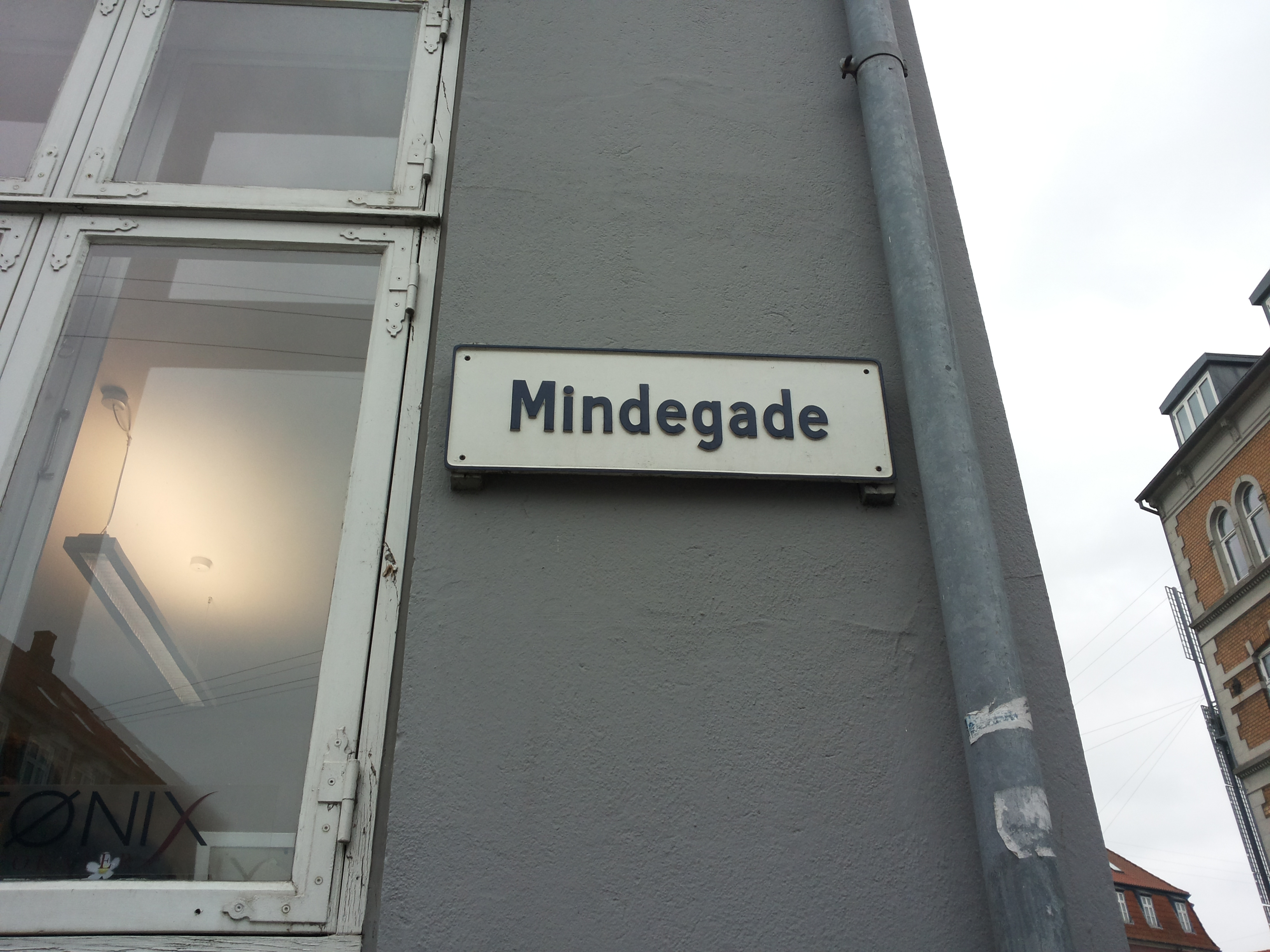
- Mindegade
- Length: 120 m (390 ft)
- Location: Indre By, Aarhus, Denmark
- Postal code: 8000
- Coordinates: 56°09′13.5″N 10°12′40.6″E

Mindegade is a 120 meters long street in Aarhus, Denmark, situated in the historic Indre By neighborhood. Mindegade runs from north to south from Fiskergade to Dynkarken and the square Europaplads. Mindegade gradually evolved from around 1606 as the city slowly extended southwards as the harbor was expanded and the river was covered up. The name is from some time before 1796 and refers to the nearby outlet of the river; the word "minde" is an old Danish world for river mouth and "gade" means street. Mindegade is fairly narrow and is a one-way street going from north to south. *The street contains two listed buildings; Trods Katholm and Hans Broge's House.

== History ==
The city gate Mindeport was originally situated at the end of Mindegade and is first mentioned in the 1500s. Mindeport was the gate travelers coming from the south had to come through. After coming through the gate one had to move over the bridge Mindebroen to cross the Aarhus river and move on into Skolegade and the city proper. In 1690 the city gate was moved further south to Dynkarken by Ridderstræde but as the area became more heavily populated it was eventually moved to Sønder Allé. In 1857 the octroi taxes were abolished and Mindeport along with the rest of the gates in the city were torn down.

In 1606 the large mansion »Trods Katholm« was erected at the southern edge of the city by Fiskergade. The area was not especially attractive and new developments tended to mostly happen to the north and west. In 1634 the bridge Mindebroen was built across the Aarhus river south of Trods Katholm and it became possible to develop a new neighborhood by the river mouth. The new neighborhood was initially called "over broen" (Lit. Over the bridge) and later "Mindegade" and "Dynkarken". The harbor saw a series of expansions in the 18th century and the piers were gradually extended into the bay which made Mindegade increasingly attractive and a main thoroughfare to the city center. The proximity to the harbor and the road leading south made it an attractive area for merchants who built many of the buildings in the street, including Hans Broge's House. In the 1930s the river by the coast was paved over and Mindegade lost its significance as a thoroughfare.
