= Kneisel Quartet =

American string quartet, 1885 to 1917

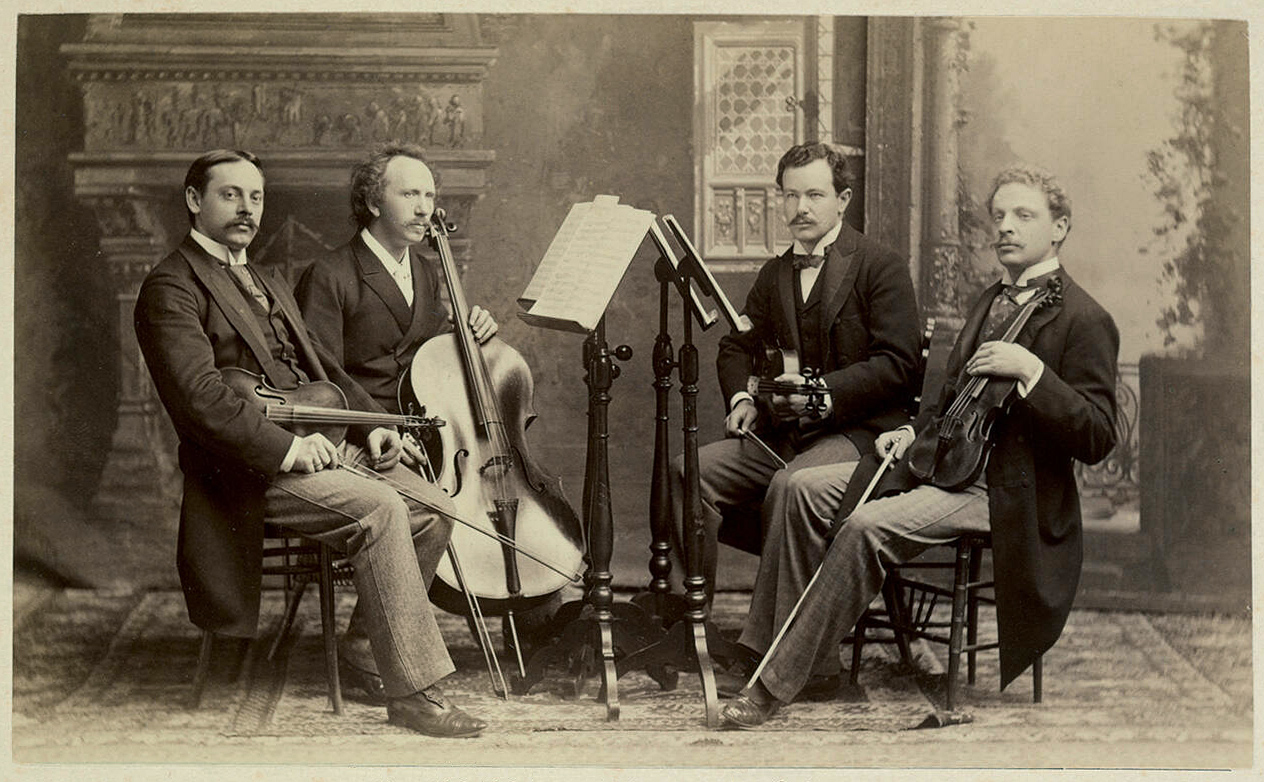
The Kneisel Quartet between 1891 and 1899. From left to right: Franz Kneisel (first violin), Alwin Schroeder (cello), Louis Svećenski (viola), Otto Roth (second violin).

The Kneisel Quartet was a string quartet founded in 1885 by violinist Franz Kneisel, then concertmaster of the Boston Symphony Orchestra. It continued to perform until 1917, and was generally considered the leading string quartet of its time in the United States.

== Origin and history ==
The Kneisel Quartet was founded in 1885, soon after Franz Kneisel arrived in Boston as concertmaster of the Boston Symphony Orchestra. The original members of the quartet were all members of the Boston Symphony Orchestra, and this remained true, in spite of changes in personnel, until 1903, when the players resigned from the orchestra in order to devote their time and energy exclusively to chamber music. In 1905 they moved from Boston to New York City, where Kneisel had accepted a position at the recently created Institute of Musical Art (now the Juilliard School of Music). The quartet gave its final performance on 3 April 1917 in New York. In a statement announcing their retirement, Kneisel explained that henceforth he planned to devote himself to teaching and he wanted to avoid any decline in the quality of their performances.

== Personnel ==
First Violin:

- Franz Kneisel (1885–1917)

Second violin:

- Emanuel Fiedler (1885–1887)
- Otto Roth (1887–1899)
- Karel Ondříček (1899–1902)
- Julius Theodorowicz (1902–1907)
- Julius Röntgen (1907–1912)
- Hans Letz (1912–1917)

Viola:

- Louis Svećenski (1885–1917)

Cello:

- Fritz Giese (1885–1889)
- Anton Hekking (1889–1891)
- Alwin Schroeder (1891–1907)
- Willem Willeke (1907–1917)

== Repertoire and reputation ==
The Kneisel Quartet played an important role in the growth of appreciation for chamber music in the United States, and in the spread of European standards of performance and programming. The quartet adopted an uncompromisingly serious approach in their playing and choice of repertoire, making "no concessions to public ignorance". In place of the popular selections and excerpts from larger works that many audiences were familiar with, they regularly played complete quartets by Haydn, Mozart, and Beethoven, and they introduced to American audiences many compositions that are now part of the classical repertoire, but were then new and unfamiliar, including works by Brahms, Dvořák, Smetana, Franck, Debussy, Ravel, and Schoenberg. They also played many contemporary works by American composers, such as Edward MacDowell, Arthur Foote, and George Chadwick, and were exceptionally supportive of the work of women composers and musicians, such as Amy Beach and Bertha Tapper, with whom they sometimes performed. The quartet toured widely and gave concerts in small towns across North America that had rarely, if ever, heard a professional instrumental ensemble playing serious works from the chamber repertoire. It was occasionally criticized for not playing more accessible music, and even in Boston and New York its concerts were not always well attended, but by the time of its retirement the Kneisel Quartet was widely credited with having created a more educated and appreciative audience for chamber music in the United States. As the New York critic Richard Aldrich wrote in 1917,

The interest in chamber music, the appreciation of the highest possibilities of its performance, the knowledge of many of the greatest compositions in this form of art were cultivated to the highest point by the Kneisel Quartet. There were earlier workers in the field, pioneers to whom honor and credit are due, and who shall not be forgotten. But the Kneisel Quartet reached a higher level than was attained by any of them, and has exercised a correspondingly greater influence. It has been one of the greatest forces for good in the musical history of this country.

=== Selected first performances ===
- Brahms, String Quintet No. 2. First American performance, 6 November 1891.
- Loeffler, String Sextet. World premiere, 15 December 1893, New York,
- Dvořák, String Quartet no. 12 ("American"). World premiere, 1 January 1894, Boston (followed by the first New York performance on 13 January).
- Debussy, String Quartet. First American performance, 10 March 1902, Boston.
- Ravel, String Quartet. First American performance, 4 December 1906, Boston.
- Schoenberg, Verklärte Nacht. First American performance, 2 March 1915, New York (followed by first performances in Boston, Philadelphia, and Chicago).
