= Piano Quintet in G minor (Sibelius) =

Piano quintet by Jean Sibelius (1890)

- by Jean Sibelius
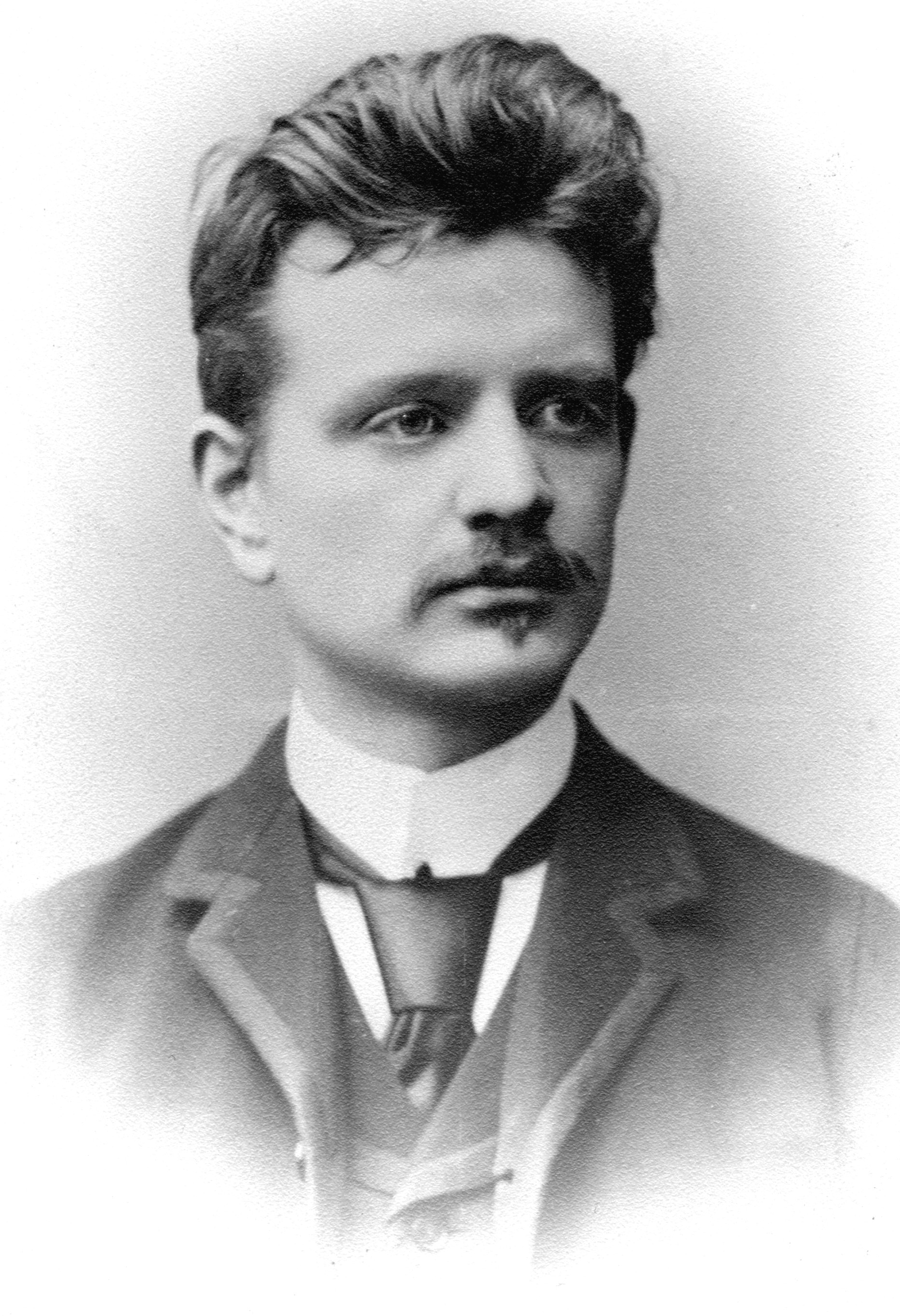
- The composer in 1889
- Catalogue: JS 159
- Composed: 1890
- Publisher: Hansen (1993)
- Duration: 36.5 mins.
- Movements: 5

Premiere
- Date: 5 May 1890 (Movements I, III)
- Location: Helsinki, Grand Duchy of Finland
- Performers: Johan Halvorsen (violin); Karl Wasenius (violin); Josef Schwartz (viola); Otto Hutschenreuter (cello); Ferruccio Busoni (piano)

The Piano Quintet in G minor, JS 159, is a five-movement chamber piece for two violins, viola, cello, and piano written in 1890 by the Finnish composer Jean Sibelius. When composing the piece, Sibelius replaced the original Movement IV (marked Vivace) with a scherzo (Vivacissimo); the earlier Vivace is extant.

== History ==
Movements I and III of the Piano Quintet premiered in Helsinki on 5 May 1890 at the Music Institute (now the Sibelius Academy); the performers included the Norwegian composer Johan Halvorsen (violin) and the Italian composer Ferruccio Busoni (piano), as well as Karl Wasenius (violin), Josef Schwartz (viola), and Otto Hutschenreuter (cello). Movements II and IV had their premieres a half-year later on 11 October the first four movements were performed in Turku; among the soloists was Sibelius's close friend, the playwright Adolf Paul, who played piano, as well as Richard Hagel on first violin.

At neither of the two 1890 concerts was Movement V played. As a result, Sibelius rescued themes from the finale by reusing them for the Rondo in D minor (JS 162, 1893) for viola and piano duo, as well as the first of the Six Impromptus (Op. 5/1, 1893) for solo piano. In 1965, Movement V was played for the first time when the quintet in its entirety was premiered properly on 24 May at the Turku Concert Hall; the instrumentalists were as follows: Tuomas Haapanen (violin), Pekka Kari (violin), Mauri Pietikäinen (viola), Erkki Rautio (cello), and Liisa Pohjola (piano).

== Structure ==
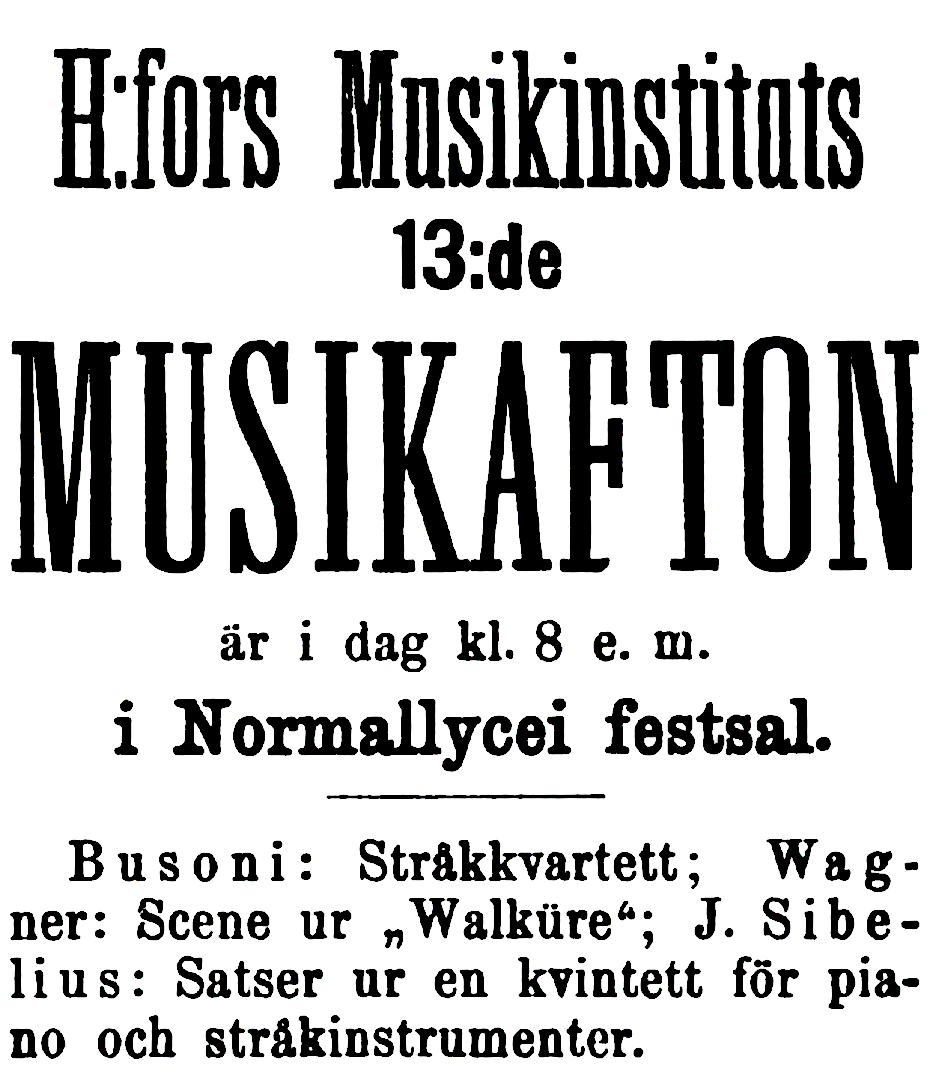
A 5 May 1890 ad promoting the premiere of Sibelius's G minor Quintet (Movements I and III only; II and IV premiered in October, and V in 1965.)

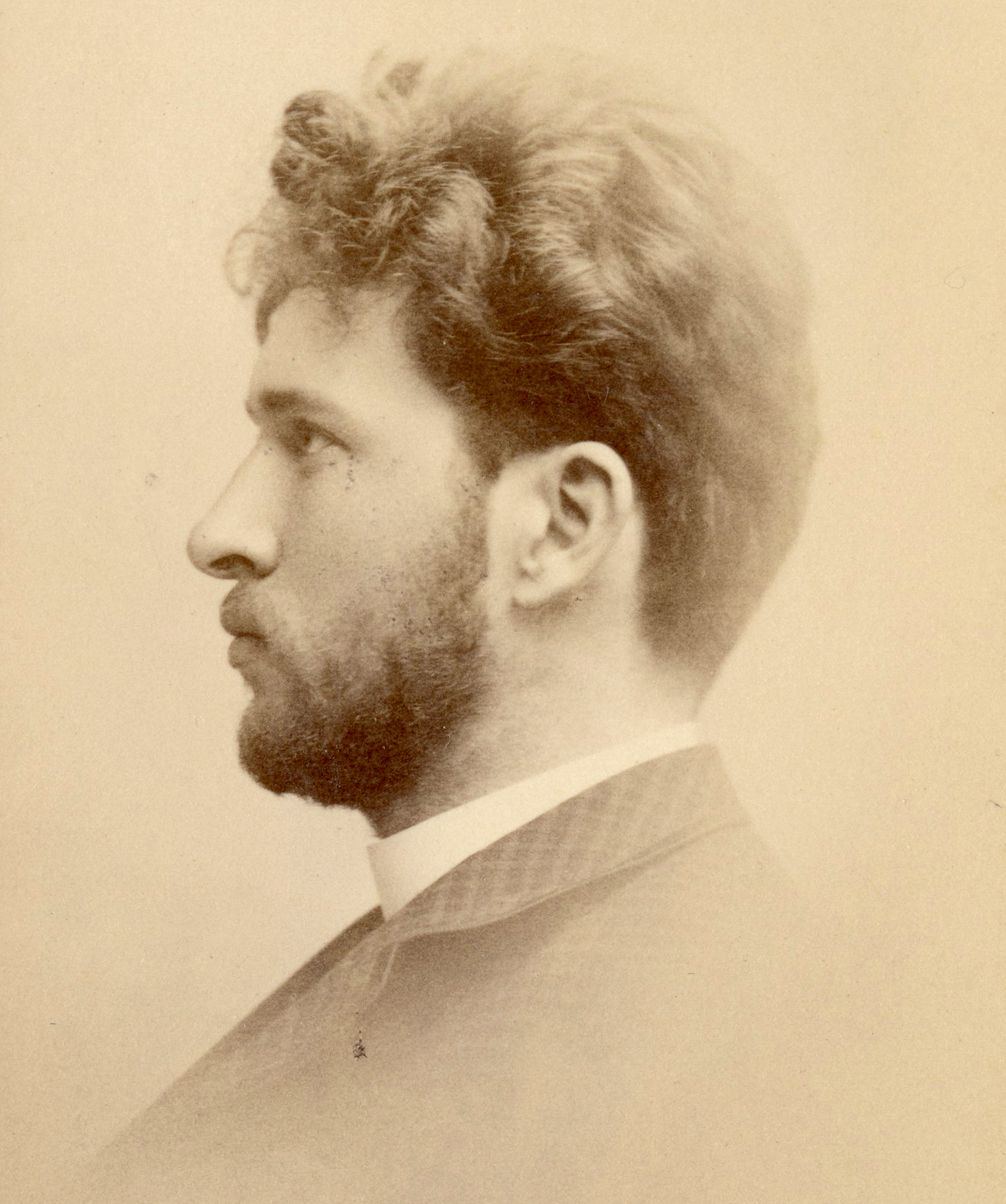
The Italian composer Ferruccio Busoni played the piano at the premiere; he taught at the Helsinki Music Institute and was a friend of Sibelius's.

The G minor Quintet is in five movements, as follows:

1. Grave – Allegro
2. Intermezzo. Moderato
3. Andante
4. Scherzo. Vivacissimo
5. Moderato – Vivace

The piece was published posthumously in 1993 by Edition Wilhelm Hansen.

The first movement, marked Grave – Allegro, is in 3/2 time; it has a duration of about 10 minutes.

The second movement is an intermezzo; marked Moderato and in 4/4 time, it has a duration of about 4.5 minutes.

The third movement, marked Andante, is in 2/4 time; it has a duration of about nine minutes.

The fourth movement is a scherzo; marked Vivacissimo and in 3/4 time, it has a duration of about 3.5 minutes.

The fifth movement begins Moderato in 4/4 time before switching to 6/8 for the Vivace. It has a duration of about 9.5 minutes.

== Discography ==
The Finnish pianist Erik T. Tawaststjerna and the Sibelius Academy Quartet made the world premiere studio recording of the G minor Quintet for Finlandia in 1985. The table below lists this and other commercially available recordings:

| No. | Violin I | Violin II | Viola | Cello | Piano | Runtime (Note: All runtimes are official, as printed on CD or LP liner notes.) | Rec. (Note: Refers to the year in which the performers recorded the work; this may not be the same as the year in which the recording was first released to the general public.) | Recording venue | Label | Ref. |
|---|---|---|---|---|---|---|---|---|---|---|
| 1 | Seppo Tukiainen | Erkki Kantola | Veikko Kosonen | Arto Noras | Erik T. Tawaststjerna | 36:15 | 1985 | Roihuvuoren kirkko | Finlandia | (Note: Sibelius Academy Quartet, Tawaststjerna–Finlandia (FACD 375) 1989) |
| 2 | John Georgiadis | Brendan O'Reilly | Ian Jewel | Keith Harvey | Anthony Goldstone | 39:35 | 1989 | Snape Maltings Concert Hall | Chandos | (Note: Gabrieli Quartet, Goldstone–Chandos (CHAN 8742) 1989) |
| 3 | Götz Bernau | Antti Meurman | Ulla Kekko | Juha Malmivaara | Ella & Jaakko Untamala | 37:30 | 1994 | [Unknown], Kuopio | Edition Abseits | (Note: Pihtipudas Quintet–Edition Abseits (EDA 007–2) 1994) |
| 4 | Jaakko Kuusisto | Laura Vikman | Anna Kreetta Gribajcevic | Joel Laakso | Folke Gräsbeck | 38:53 | 2005 | Järvenpää Hall | BIS | (Note: Kuusisto, Vikman, Gribajcevic, Laakso, Gräsbeck–BIS (CD–1412) 2007) |
| 5 | Roger Coull | Philip Gallaway | Gustav Clarkson | Nicholas Roberts | Martin Roscoe | 37:16 | 2008 | St Paul's Church, Birmingham | Somm | (Note: Coull Quartet, Roscoe–Somm (SOMMCD 096) 2010) |

== Notes, references, and sources ==
Notes

Sources

- Barnett, Andrew (2007). Sibelius. New Haven: Yale University Press. ISBN 978-0-300-11159-0.
- Dahlström, Fabian [in Swedish] (2003). Jean Sibelius: Thematisch-bibliographisches Verzeichnis seiner Werke [Jean Sibelius: A Thematic Bibliographic Index of His Works] (in German). Wiesbaden: Breitkopf & Härtel. ISBN 3-7651-0333-0.
