= Hans Broge's House =

Coordinates: 56.1537°N 10.2111°E

- Hans Broges Gård
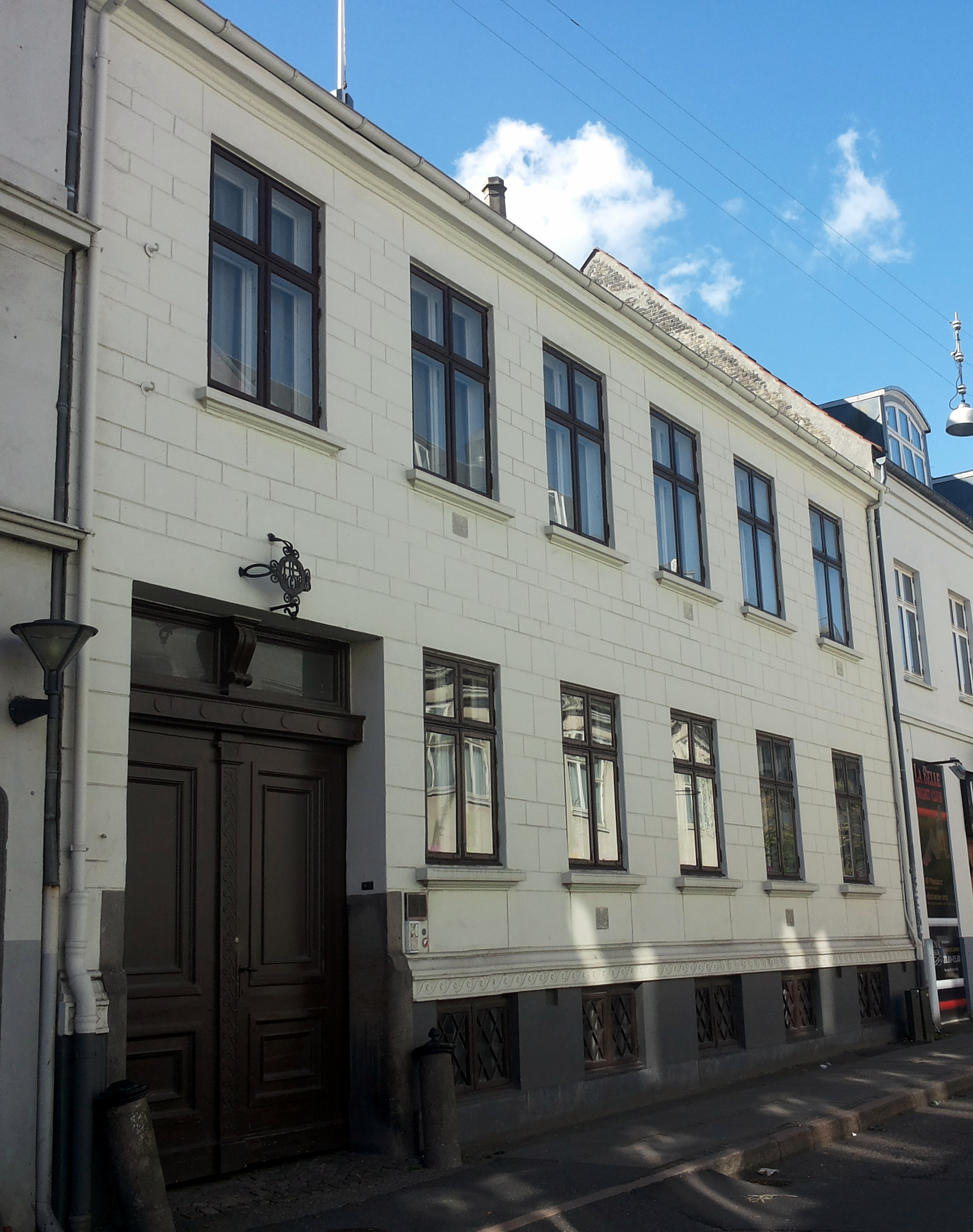
- Interactive map of the Hans Broge's House area

General information
- Architectural style: Classicism, Empire
- Location: Aarhus, Denmark
- Construction started: 1849
- Completed: 1850

Technical details
- Floor count: 2
- Floor area: 492 m^{2} (5,300 sq ft)

Design and construction
- Architect: Hans Wilhelm Schrøder

Hans Broge's House (Danish: Hans Broges Gård) is a house and a listed building in Aarhus, Denmark. The house was built in 1850 and was listed on the Danish registry of protected buildings and places by the Danish Heritage Agency on 6 September 1987. The house is situated in the historic Indre by neighborhood on Mindegade close to the harbor and the Port of Aarhus.

Hans Broge's House was constructed by the prominent businessman and politician Hans Broge who was active in the port expansions and emerging industrial factories at the nearby harbor front at the time. The building is in classicist style and a simplified version of empire style. It is a two-story building, which was typical in the city at the time, with cornice bands below the windows, a prominent base and shadow joints. The building material is brick with plastered facades and a tiled pitched roof. in. Architecturally the building is characterized by exact symmetrical measurements of the individual elements.
