= Schrøder =

Schrøder is a Danish surname, a variant of Schröder. Notable people with this surname include:

- Abel Schrøder (c. 1602–1676), Danish woodcarver
- Caspar Schrøder (5 December 1905 – 25 April 1989) was a Danish fencer
- Christian Schrøder (13 July 1869 – 10 December 1940), Danish film actor, screenwriter and director
- Frederik Carl Gram Schrøder (19 July 1866 – 13 August 1936), Danish civil servant, Governor of Danmarks Nationalbank
- Hans Wilhelm Schrøder (24 June 1810 – 14 April 1888), Danish architect
- Helge Muxoll Schrøder (27 November 1924 – 2 March 2012) was a Danish rower
- Kay Schrøder (1 July 1877 – 25 April 1949) was a Danish fencer
- Knud Schrøder (28 July 1903 – 15 December 1976) was a Danish film actor
- Martha Schrøder (11 September 1918 – 27 September 2009) was a Norwegian politician
- Søren Wølck Schrøder (born 1962/63) is a Danish businessman
