= Schreider =

Schreider is a Northern American and German family name. Notable people with the surname include:

- Helen Schreider (b. 1926), American explorer
- Gary Schreider (1934–2011), Canadian football player
- Frank Schreider (1924–1994), American explorer

== Fictional people ==
- Schreider (or Shredder), a character of Log Horizon

== See also ==
- Schröder
- Schreiter
