= Gerhard Schröder (disambiguation) =

Gerhard Schröder (born 1944) is a former German Social Democratic Party politician who served as Chancellor of Germany from 1998 to 2005.

Gerhard Schröder may also refer to:

- Gerhard Schröder (1910–1989), was a German Christian Democratic Union politician, who served as Federal Minister of the Interior from 1953 to 1961, then as Federal Minister of Foreign Affairs from 1961 to 1966 and later as Federal Minister of Defence from 1966 to 1969.
- Gerhard Schröder (1921–2012), was a German radio and television executive, who was the director of Norddeutscher Rundfunk and Radio Bremen.
