= Alwin Schroeder =

German-American cellist

Alwin Schroeder (15 June 1855, Neuhaldensleben – 17 October 1928, Boston) was a German-American cellist. He was well known for playing with the Boston Symphony Orchestra (BSO first cellist from 1891 to 1903 and from 1910 to 1912, and section cellist member from 1918 to 1925). He was the cellist of the Kneisel Quartet from 1891 to 1907.

== Biography ==
Alwin was the youngest of four sons of Carl Schroeder (Karl Schröder I, 1816–1890 or 1823–1889), the music director in Neuhaldensleben. He had three older brothers that were also musicians: Hermann Schroeder (1843–1909) became a composer and violin professor in Berlin, Germany; Carl II (Karl Schröder II, 1848–1935) became a cello professor in the Leipzig Conservatory before being appointed as court conductor to the Prince of Sondershausen in 1881; and Franz (born before 1855 – ?) would work as a conductor in St. Petersburg, Russia. Alwin was seven years old when he began his music studies, he received piano lessons from his father and violin lessons from his eldest brother. Later, he studied the piano with J. B. Andre at Ballenstedt and attended the Berlin Hochschule fur Musik, studying violin with De Ahna and music theory with Tappert.

It was during his tenure at the Leipzig Conservatory that he had the idea for a progressively ordered compilation of etudes by various cellists. He published it many years later in the United States as the three-volume and called it 170 Foundation Studies for Violoncello. Among Schroeder's publications during the Leipzig years were his Neue Tonleiter-Studien and Technische Uebungen for the development of left-hand technique for cellists and his edition of the six solo cello suites by J. S. Bach.

In the 1946 biographical book "The Islanders" by Elizabeth Foster (1905-1963) which detailed her childhood with her grandfather, Frederick Stoever Dickson (1850-1925) at the family summer home on Rangeley Lake in Maine, Alwin Schroeder was described as a frequent summer visitor to the Dickson home. Foster recalled that whenever her grandfather would invite Schroeder, “he would accept promptly, adding ‘And I will bring my ‘toothbrush.’ The ‘toothbrush’ was his pet name for his cello. [Dickson] never asked him to play, feeling that it was more tactful not to, but he always did.” On these visits, “Schroeder's cello was too large to go through the tiny door of the parlor car, and too valuable to make the journey in the baggage car, so it was always placed on the rear platform where Schroeder could watch it and stop the train immediately if by some dreadful chance it fell off.” Foster also recalled that “Schroeder's best friend was an Austrian musician who was also an excellent shot. He taught him how to shoot and Schroeder, who had for the most part led a sedentary life indoors, became wildly enthusiastic about this manly pursuit and arrived one summer at the island with his cello and a shotgun. [Dickson] told him that game birds were out of season, but this did not upset him in the least. [...] Each evening he would return to the island with a surprising assortment of wild fowl and small animals. He was extremely proud of his aim, and insisted upon having his trophies stuffed by the village taxidermist so he could take them home and show the Boston Symphony what a remarkable Nimrod he was. To his chagrin, he discovered that taxidermy was quite expensive, but that deterred him only momentarily. He went on shooting everything within range, and by the end of his visit he had a collection worthy of a natural history museum. He packed them all in wooden boxes, and was as fussy about them as though they had been Stradivari.” Foster concludes with a humorous recollection of Schroeder growing so concerned with packing his fowl collection on the train for his return to Boston that he forgot to pack his cello, and subsequently had to call for the train to be stopped so he could retrieve it.
