= Schreiter =

Schreiter is a German surname. Notable people with the surname include:

- Ida Schreiter (1912–1948), German labor department warden
- Johannes Schreiter (b. 1930), German graphic artist
- Katrin Schreiter (b. 1969), German sprinter

== See also ==
- Schreider
