= Schraeder =

Schraeder or Von Schraeder is a German surname, a variant of Schröder. Notable people with the surname include:

- Eric Schraeder
- Fred J. Schraeder
- Jeanna Schraeder
- Ryan Schraeder

== Fictional characters ==
- Baroness Elsa Schraeder from The Sound of Music (film)
- Griffin Schraeder from Movie 43
- Helmut Von Schraeder, the protagonist from Twist of Fate (1989 TV series)
- Joseph von Schraeder from Working Girls (1931 film)
- Kurt Schraeder from Teen Idol (novel)
- Martin Schraeder from Night Watch (1995 film)

== See also ==
- Schaeder
