= Hans Wilhelm Schrøder =

Danish architect

- Born: 24 May 1810; Kalundborg, Denmark
- Died: 14 April 1888 (aged 77); Copenhagen, Denmark
- Education: Royal Danish Academy of Fine Arts
- Occupation: Architect

Hans Wilhelm Schrøder (24 June 1810 – 14 April 1888) was a Danish architect.

== Biography ==
Schrøder was born in Kalundborg, Denmark. He was the son of Carl Gram Schrøder and Anna Marie Margrethe Born Kihl. He attended the Royal Danish Academy of Fine Arts from 1837 to 1839 before he graduated with a degree in architecture. He was privately tutored by Theophilus Hansen and worked for architects Jørgen Hansen Koch and Frederik Ferdinand Friis.

Schrøder established himself in Aarhus as a carpenter and architect in 1844 and went into partnership with a design school. He was the first architect with an academic degree to establish himself in the city and in the following decades he introduced Neoclassical architecture across the city with many buildings carrying his signature: the 3-parted facade with a retracted middle and two side wings with triple windows.

In 1860, he assumed the position of temporary royal building inspector for Jutland and Fuenen during the illness of Ferdinand Thielemann. Schrøder's tenure notably saw him solve a complicated problem in the Dominican Priory in Viborg where a vault in the nave was at risk of collapse.

== Personal life ==
About 1843, he married Ermotte Charlotte Schrøder (1814–1896). In 1870, the Schrøder family relocated to Copenhagen where he died in 1888. He was buried at Frederiksberg Ældre Kirkegård.

== Selected works ==
- Renovation and remodeling of Aarhus Cathedral School, (1847, later changed by Hack Kampmann 1905)
- Studsgade 10 (1847)
- Mejlgade 7 (1849)
- Hans Broge's House (1849)
- Fredenstorv 6 (1849)
- Housing, Jægergårdsgade.
- Raae's Gård (1858, with Ferdinand Thielemann)
- Worked on defences at Dannevirke and Dybbøl during the Second Schleswig War (1864) as a master carpenter.
