= Dominican Priory, Viborg =

Church building in Viborg Municipality, Denmark

Coordinates: 56°26′57.6″N 9°24′39.2″E

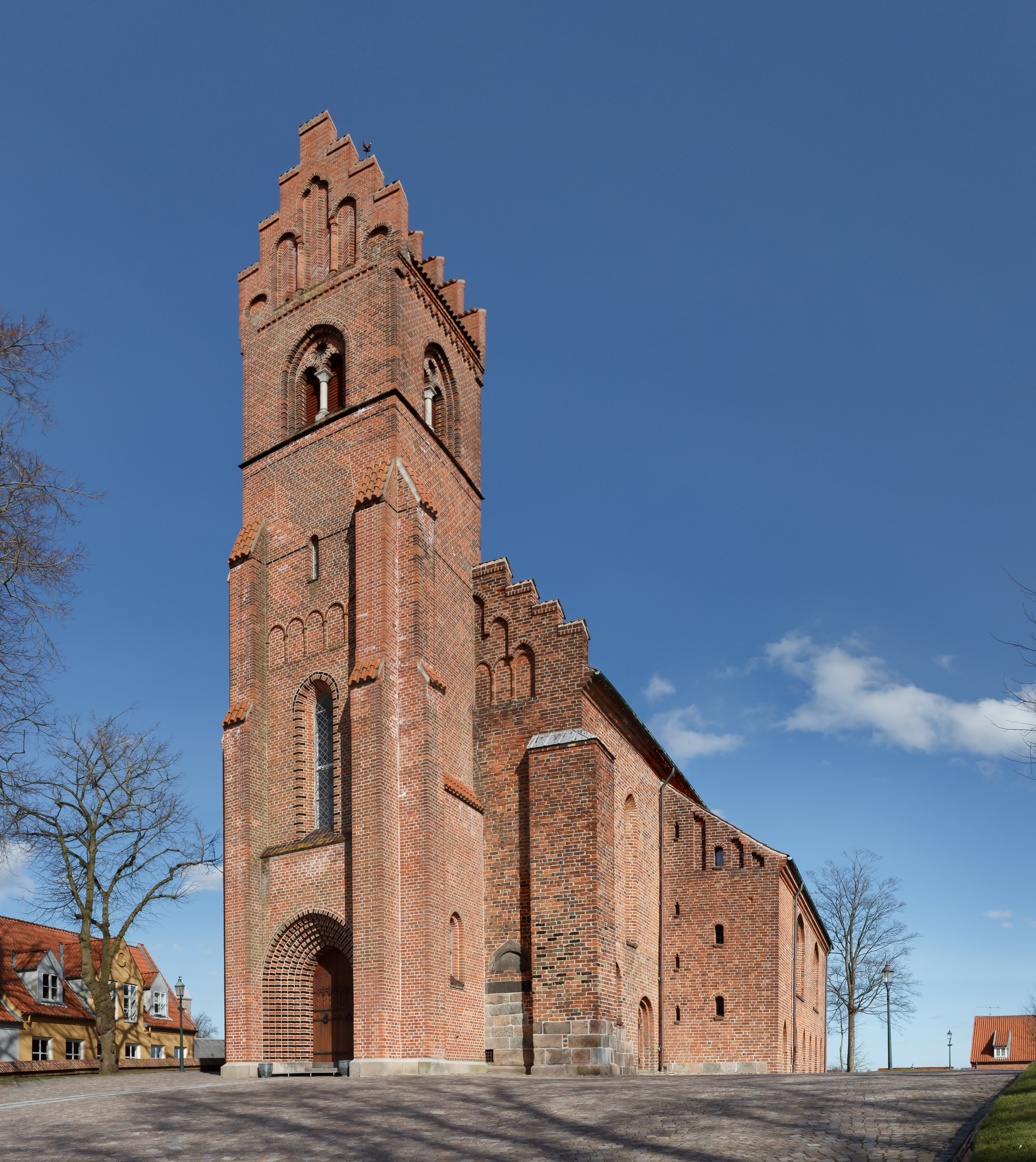
Former Dominican Priory church, Viborg, now the Sortebrødre Kirke

The Dominican Priory, Viborg, or Blackfriars (Sortebrødrekloster) was an important Dominican monastery in Viborg, Denmark, during the Middle Ages.

== History ==
The Dominicans were a mendicant order which relied on the gifts of local people for their day to day sustenance. Their work was teaching and a rigorous daily schedule of prayers, meditation, and study. The order was introduced into Denmark by Brother Solomon from Aarhus in the 1220s.

Viborg Priory was established perhaps as early as 1227 by Bishop Gunnar of Viborg. It is first mentioned in the church annals in 1246 when donations to the priory are listed.

The priory church was completed towards the end of the 13th century in red brick in the Gothic style and consisted of a choir, sacristy, and central nave. It was located on the north of the priory so as to be near the town. Women were excluded from the church except during church holidays. It was unusual in that preaching was in the Danish language from 1254.

The priory complex consisted of four ranges built in a rectangle around a central courtyard. One of the wings was a dormitory which had individual cells for the friars and places for novices and lay brothers. The Dominican custom was to sleep fully clothed, including footgear, so that they would be ready to travel at a moment's notice.

The chapter room was used for meetings and for receiving important guests. The refectory was used as a communal dining hall connected to the bakery, brewery, and storage areas. The friars had a modest library and study hall. Another wing was for guests and a hospital. Over time, through the gifts of local residents, the priory acquired land, farms and a brickworks, worked by servants, lay brothers or compulsory work owed by local farms.

A wall encircled the entire priory, and the entrances were so narrow that they prevented anyone from riding or driving into the open courtyard.

Few of the priors' names are known as written records are scarce. Prior Adam is mentioned in 1353. Prior Niels Jepsen is named in the transfer of a farm to Bishop Erik Kaas in 1516. The last prior was Niels Vinoldsen, named in the dissolution of the priory in 1529.

== Dissolution ==
The Reformation brought an end to the priory in Viborg and to the Dominicans in Denmark. Both Franciscans and Dominicans felt the effects of the religious reforms which swept through Denmark in the early 16th century. Many Danes felt that the tithes, fees, and work due to religious houses were a burden on a generally poor country. Dominicans and Franciscans, as mendicant orders, added to that burden by requiring constant donations of food, fuel, drink, and services from the local population. Frederick I and Christian III, both of whom were reform-minded kings, received letters of complaint about the mendicant orders and in 1527 began granting local requests to close monasteries. Force was used to shut down religious houses in 27 town in Denmark, including Viborg. In a letter dated 23 February 1529 the king ordered that the priory should be dissolved, that the church was to become a parish church, and that citizen Jens Hvas was to take possession of the priory buildings as personal property.

A fire damaged the priory buildings in 1552 and it appears they were pulled down and the materials used in other houses and businesses in Viborg. The church continued to serve as the parish church for the southern part of Viborg (whence it was known as the Søndre Sognkirke, or "southern parish church"). A narrow tower was added to the front of the priory church in 1696-1701 with funds raised by Christen Erichsøn, the local parish priest.

The town fire of 1726 weakened the remaining structure so badly that church officials decided to demolish the church and to combine the "priory parish" with the "cathedral parish" until it could be rebuilt. Construction began immediately using the groundplan of the original medieval church in the same style of red brick. Work was substantially completed in 1728. The tower had a high narrow spire on top.

King Frederick IV donated an altarpiece, constructed in Antwerp in 1520 by Mogens Christian Thrane, with dozens of pictures depicting scenes from the New Testament, from Christianborg Palace chapel in Copenhagen. It is the pride of the modern church.

== Current use ==
The church was restored in 1876, and the tower spire replaced with a stepped brick top which reflects the usual Danish parish tower architecture. In 1912-1917 the church underwent an even more extensive restoration which is the church that may be still seen today.

In the tower hang three bells: the two oldest from 1729 cast by Caspar Kønig, and the most recent cast by De Smithske and added to the tower in 1929.

The church features a large pipe organ by Danish builder Christensen, built in 1985, in a mixed baroque-romantic style. Its full disposition is as follows:

Great (Hovedværk)
Gedakt	16'
Principal	8'
Spidsfløjte	8'
Oktav	4'
Traversfløjte	4'
Quint	2 2/3'
Oktav	2'
Tertz	1 3/5'
Mixture	V-VI
Fagot	16'
Trompet	8'

Choir (Brystværk)
Gedakt	8'
Quintatøn	8'
Principal	4'
Rørfløjte	4'
Spidsfløjte	2'
Nasat	1 3/5'
Sesquialtera	II
Scharf	III
Krumhorn	8'
tremblant

Swell (Svelleværk)
Bordun	16'
Rørfløjte	8'
Fugara	8'
Voce celeste	8'
It. principal	4'
Blokfløjte	4'
Spidsquint	2 2/3'
Waldfløjte	2'
Tertz	1 3/5'
Mixtur	VI
Trompet harmonique	8'
Obo	8'
Clairon	4'
tremblant

Pedal
Principal	16'
Subbas	16'
Oktav	8'
Gedaktbas	8'
Koralbas	4'
Rauschquinte	VI
Basun	16'
Trompet	8'
