= Anna-Konstanze Schröder =

German politician (born 1980)

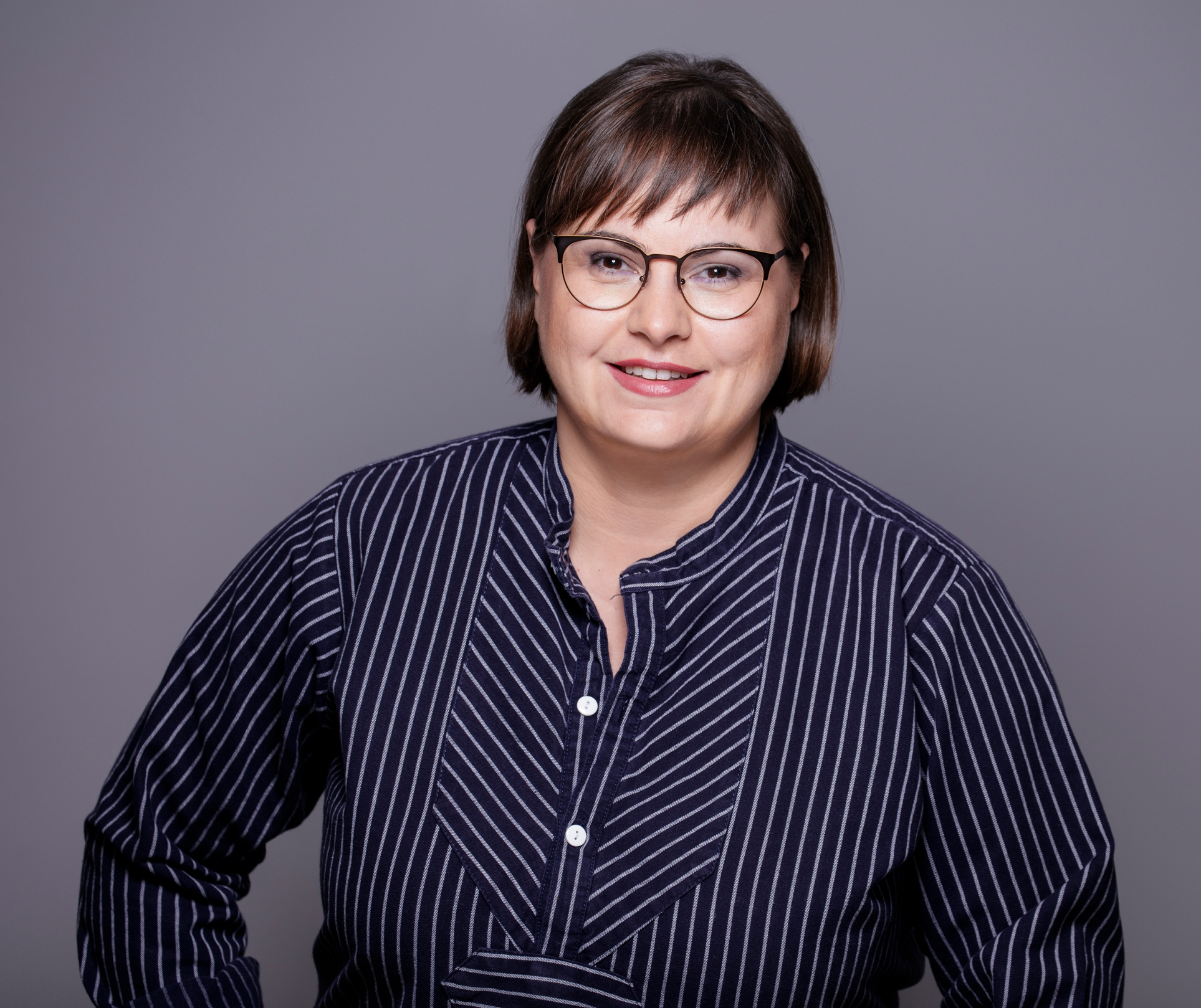
- Schröder in 2020

Member of the Landtag of Mecklenburg-Vorpommern
- Incumbent
- Assumed office 8 December 2021
- Preceded by: Jochen Schulte

Personal details
- Born: 9 December 1980 (age 45)
- Party: Social Democratic Party (since 2018)

Anna-Konstanze Schröder (born 9 December 1980) is a German politician serving as a member of the Landtag of Mecklenburg-Vorpommern since 2021. From 2018 to 2021, she served as managing director of the Heimatverband Mecklenburg-Vorpommern.
