= Jan-Christian Schröder =

German chess player

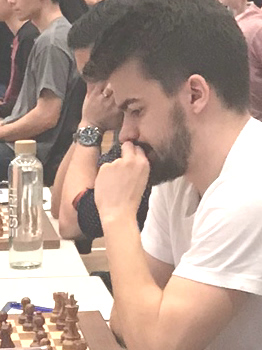
- Schröder at the 2019 Grenke Chess Open

Personal information
- Born: 31 January 1998 (age 28) Limburg an der Lahn, Germany

Chess career
- Country: Germany
- Title: Grandmaster (2015)
- FIDE rating: 2536 (July 2026)
- Peak rating: 2584 (February 2019)

Jan-Christian Schröder (born 31 January 1998) is a German chess grandmaster.

== Chess career ==
Born in 1998, Schröder earned his international master title in 2014 and his grandmaster title in 2015.
