= Martin Schröder =

Martin Schröder may refer to:

- Martin Schröder (chemist) (born 1954), professor of inorganic chemistry
- Martin Schröder (aviator) (1931–2024), founder of Martinair
