= William Schroeder =

Bill, Willy or William Schroeder or Schröder may refer to:

== Sports ==
=== American football ===
- William E. Schroeder, American football coach during 1914–16
- Bill Schroeder (halfback) (1923–2003), American football halfback for the AAFC's Chicago Rockets; also a professional basketball player for the Sheboygan Red Skins
- Bill Schroeder (wide receiver) (born 1971), American football wide receiver

=== Other sports ===
- W. R. Bill Schroeder, American co-founder of 1936 Helms Athletic Foundation
- Willy Schröder (1912–1990), German discus thrower in 1936 Olympics
- Bill Schroeder (baseball) (born 1958), American platoon / bench player; later TV broadcaster

== Government ==
- William A. Schroeder (1889–1961), American attorney and legislator in Wisconsin
- Wil Schroder (born 1982), American politician in Kentucky
- Wilfrid Schroder (1946–2013), American judge

== Others ==
- William Howard Schröder (1851–1892), South African artist, cartoonist and publisher
- William Charles Schroeder (1895–1977), American ichthyologist
- Willy Schröder, German silent film actor in 1924's Comedians of Life
- William J. Schroeder (1932–1986), American recipient of artificial heart
- William R. Schroeder, American philosopher; author of 1984's Sartre and His Predecessors
- William Knox Schroeder (1950–1970), American student killed during Kent State shootings

== See also ==
- Willy Schroeders (1932–2017), Belgian professional road bicycle racer
