= John Schroeder =

John Schroeder may refer to:

- John H. Schroeder, chancellor of University of Wisconsin–Milwaukee from 1991 to 1998
- John Schroeder (golfer) (born 1945), American golfer
- John Schroeder (musician) (1935–2017), British pop and easy listening composer, arranger, songwriter
