= Flora-Elisa Schröder =

German politician (born 1988)

Member of the Landtag of Saarland
- Incumbent
- Assumed office 25 April 2022

Personal details
- Born: 1988 (age 37–38)
- Party: Social Democratic Party (since 2010)

Flora-Elisa Schröder (born 1988) is a German politician serving as a member of the Landtag of Saarland since 2022. She has been a city councillor of Sulzbach since 2024.
