= Trods Katholm =

Coordinates: 56.1539°N 10.2107°E

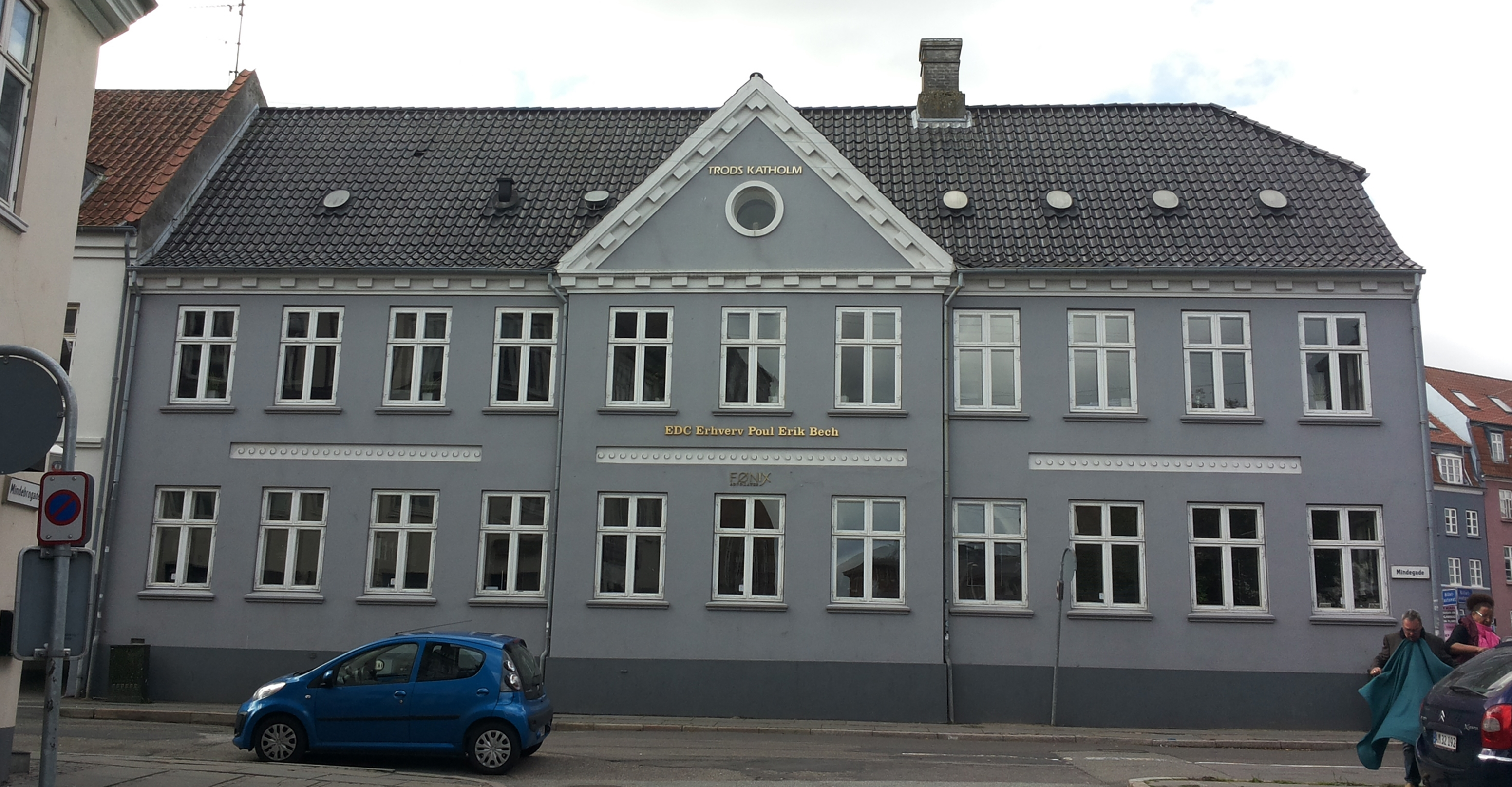
- Interactive map of the Trods Katholm area

General information
- Architectural style: Classicism
- Location: Aarhus, Denmark
- Completed: 1606

Technical details
- Floor count: 3
- Floor area: 1,654 m^{2} (17,800 sq ft)

Trods Katholm is a former manor house and a listed building in Aarhus Municipality, Denmark. The house was built in 1606 and was listed by the Danish Heritage Agency on 2 September 1994. The building complex is situated in the central Indre By neighbourhood on Fredens Torv by the Aarhus River. It is one of the oldest preserved buildings in the city with a history of many different uses. The listing includes the main building of the former manor built in 1606 and an adjacent former warehouse building from 1850.

== History ==
The building was built in 1606 for Christence Bryske, the widow of Thomas Fasti of the Katholm Castle manor. Christence Bryske died in 1639 and the family of her brother, Karl Bryske, inherited the house. In 1663 King Christian V bought the estate in order to turn it into a granary. In the early 1700s the buildings were bought by royal surveyor of provisions Christen Wegerslev for 1040 rigsdaler. The next owner was assessor Jørgen Pedersen Westergaard who owned a merchant estate in Vestergade 49 and a number of small half-timbered houses in Fiskergade. In 1761 Trods Katholm was owned by Westergaard's widow and the ground floor was used as a private residence while the upper floor was used for storing grain. In 1764 manager of Aarhus County Jens Thygesen bought Trods Katholm on auction.

In 1801 tax registers show the estate covers a main building 14 beams wide in two stories with 8 iron stoves. Compared to the registers of 1791 the building is 6 beams shorter and two floors lower. In 1801 a smaller outbuilding with rooms and kitchen and a number of other buildings for stables, wash rooms, scullery and servants quarters was noted. Another larger one story outbuilding 24 beams long contained various rooms, study and 7 iron stoves. In the garden there was a hexagonal brick pavilion.

In the mid-1800s Trods Katholm was owned by a company owned by three men; distiller Søren Thomsen, the owner of Moesgård Thorkild Christian Dahl and procurator Jens Christian Hee. In 1853 Thomsen bought Trods Katholm for himself and sold off the garden on which Fredens Torv was subsequently established. Thomsen incidentally also built Stykgodspakhuset from 1847 which is also a listed building today.

In 1857 Edwin Friedleif Rahr bought Trods Katholm and 40 years later his son Viggo Ludvig Rahr inherited it. In 1900 Rahr put the buildings through an extensive renovation and in 1911 he sold it to state attorney Kier who later gave it to his sons Wilhelm and Aage Kier. In 1975 the brothers sold Trods Katholm to the company Bruun & Sørensen. In 1988 the building was owned by an insurance company that eventually sold it off in apartment units. Trods Katholm was listed in 1994.

== Architecture ==
Trods Katholm is an example of classical architecture with a strong symmetry. It is believed to be the first brick building south of the Aarhus River, built on the edge of the city as it was expanding towards the coast. Originally the building was both longer and taller and today only the two bottom floors are preserved.

Inner courtyard:

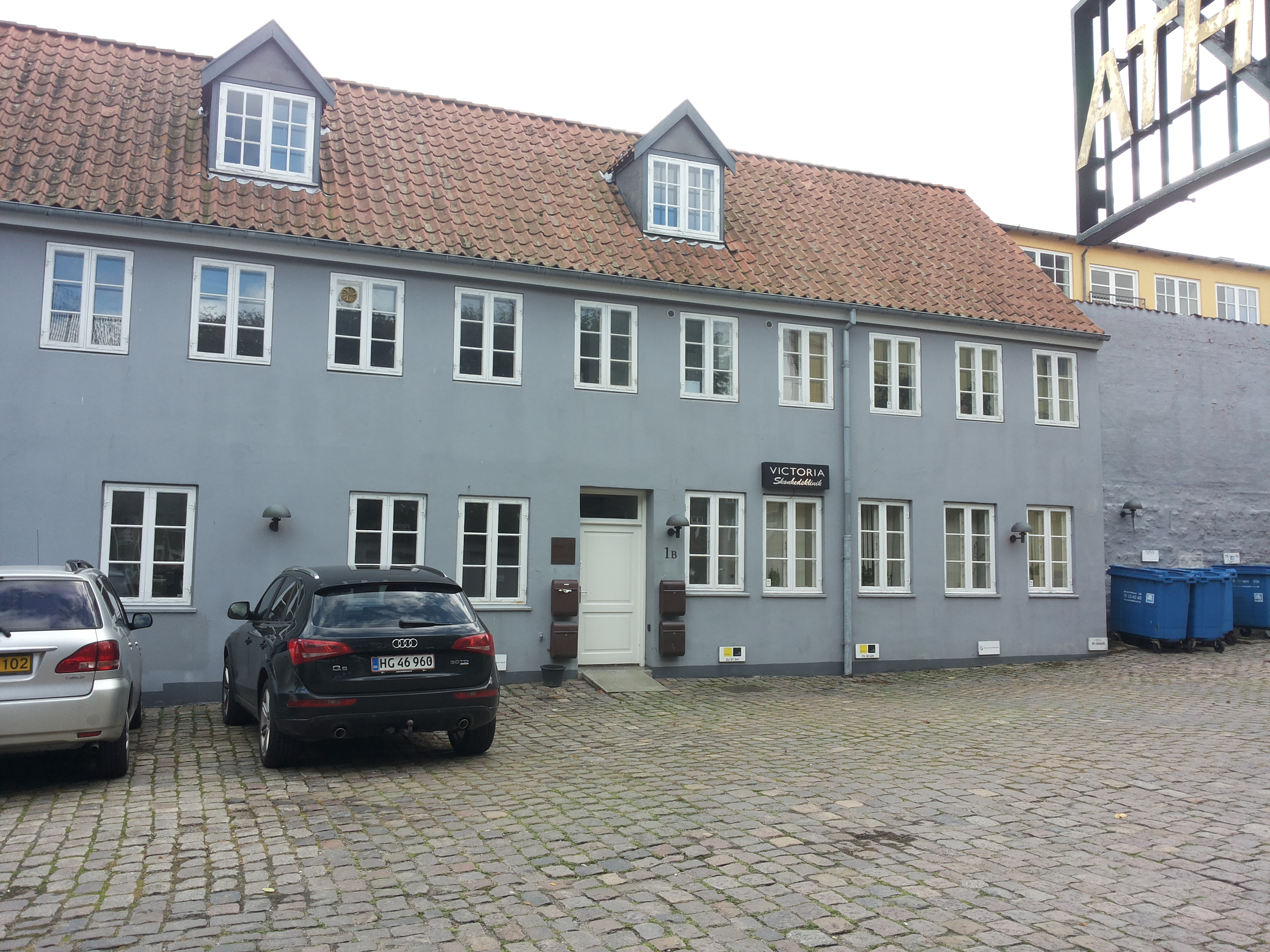

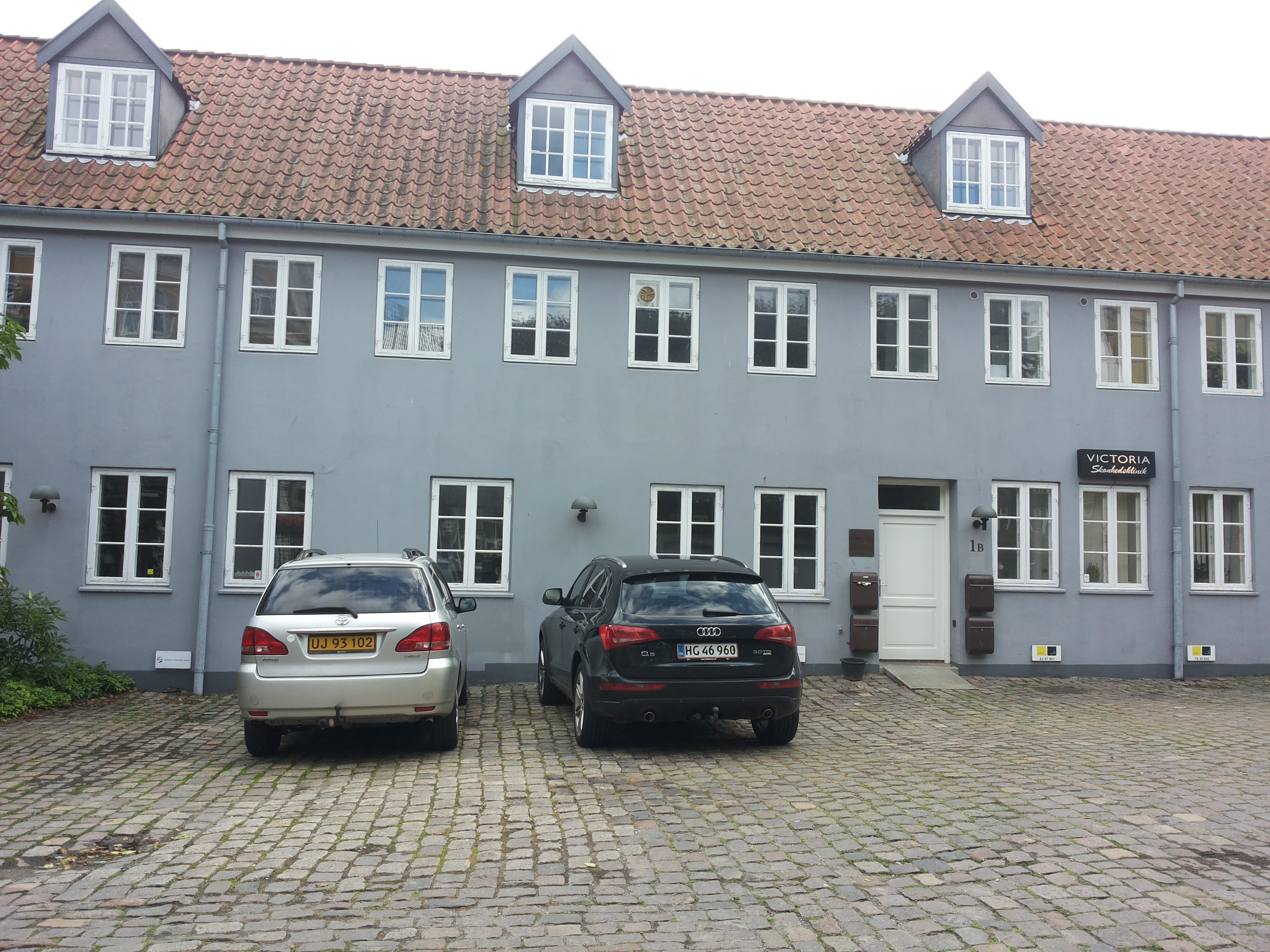

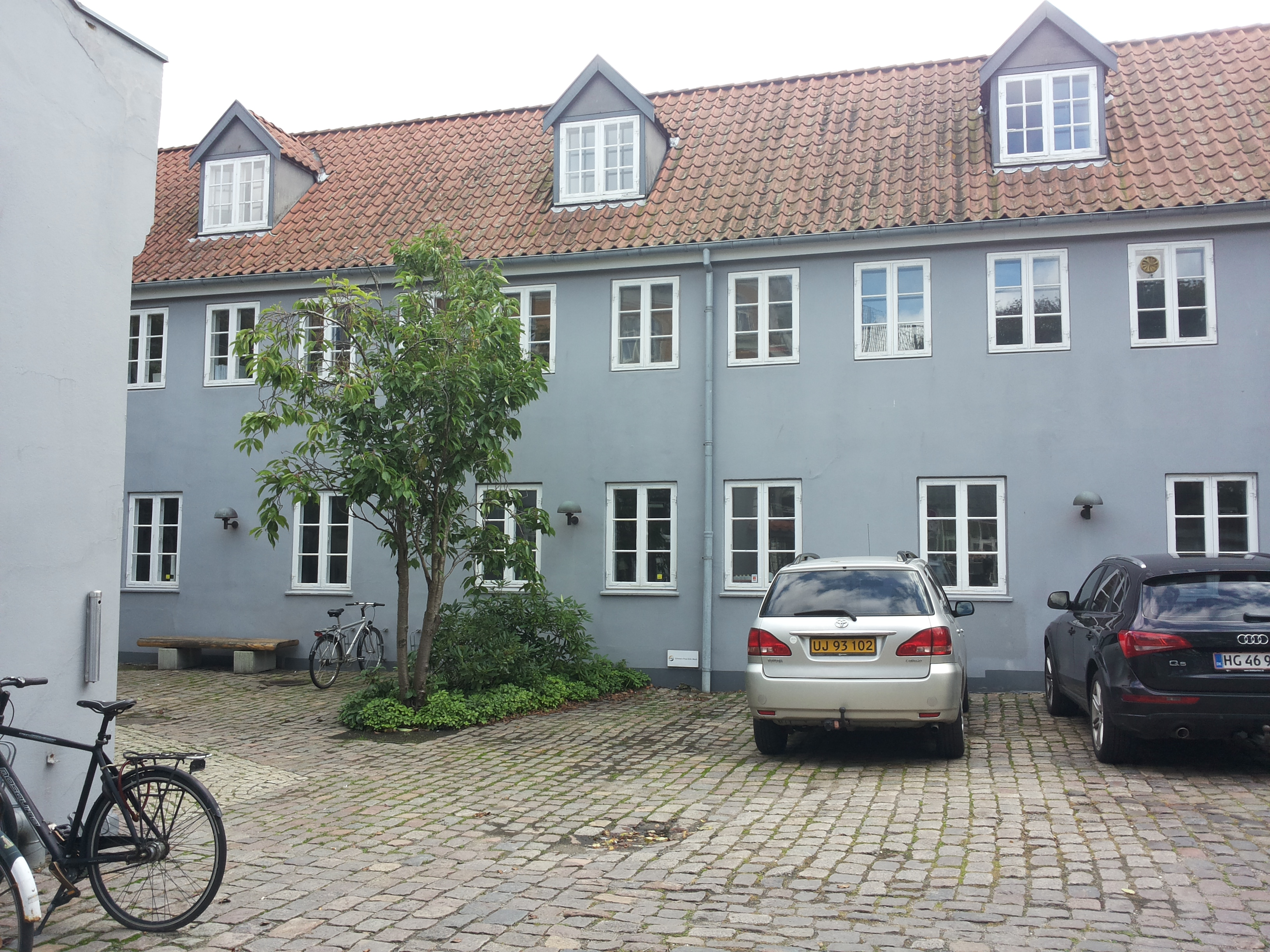

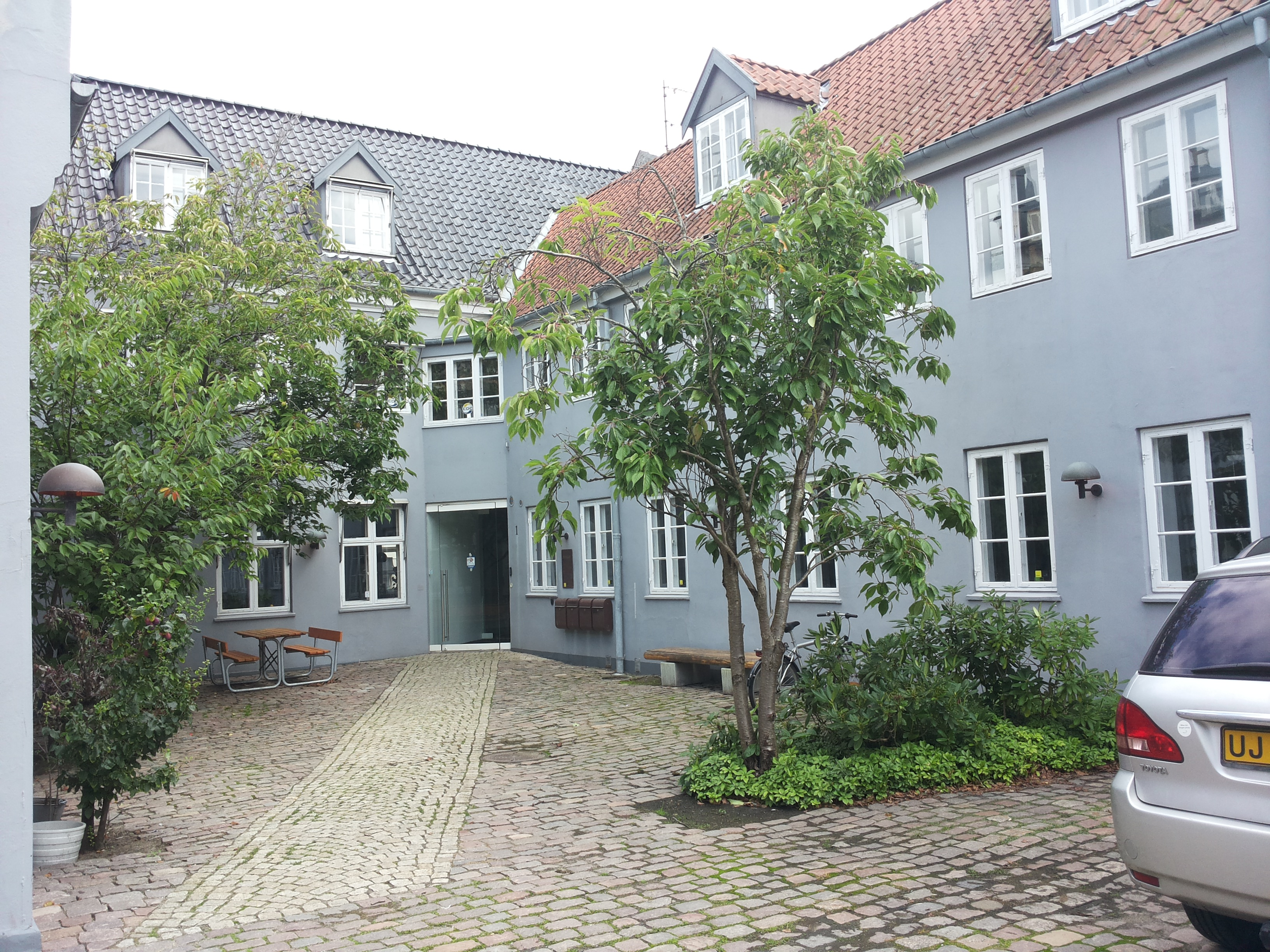

== See also ==
- Listed buildings in Aarhus Municipality
