= Harold M. Schroder =

American psychologist and academic

- Born: February 19, 1923; Australia
- Died: December 24, 2013 (aged 90); Lansing, Michigan
- Education: University of Sydney; Ohio State University
- Scientific career
- Fields: Psychology
- Workplaces: Princeton University
- Thesis: The Development and Maintenance of the Value of a Reinforcement (1954)
- Doctoral advisor: Julian Rotter

Harold Martin Schroder (February 19, 1923 – December 24, 2013) was professor of psychology at Princeton University who conducted research into the so-called 'High Performance Leadership Competencies'.

Their validation across public and private organisations was carried out by Schroder and his colleagues initially while he was Professor of Management at the University of South Florida and later in American and British corporations, including RBS.

Many leadership development consultancies utilize the so-called 'Schroder framework' he described as an objective measure of leadership behaviour critical for managing complexity and change.

His book Managerial Competence: The Key to Excellence was featured in Personnel Today's seven must-read books in 2006.

== Books ==
- Schroder, H. M. (1989). Managerial Competence: The Key to Excellence : A new strategy for management development in the information age. Dubuque, Iowa: Kendall/Hunt. ISBN 0-8403-5540-8.
- Croghan, John H.; Lake, Dale G.; Schroder, Harry M. (1983). Identification of the Competencies of High-performing Principals in Florida. Florida Council on Educational Management.
- Schroder, H. M.; Karlins, Marvin; Phares, Jacqueline O. (1973). Education for Freedom. New York: Wiley. ISBN 0-471-76330-6.
- Schroder, H. M.; Driver, M. J.; Streufert, S. (1967). Human Information Processing. New York: Holt, Rinehart & Winston. OCLC 204254.
- Harvey, O. J.; Hunt, David E.; Schroder, Harold Martin (1961). Conceptual Systems and Personality Organization. New York: Wiley. OCLC 9334443.

== Other publications ==
- Schroder, H. M. (1975). "The Development of Information Processing Capability". In Krohne, H. W. (ed.). Fortschritte der pädagogischen Psychologie [Advances in Educational Psychology]. Munich: Ernst Reinhardt. ISBN 3-497-00760-9.
- Cockerill, T.; Hunt, J.; Schroder, H. (1995). "Managerial Competencies: Fact or Fiction?". Business Strategy Review. 6 (3): 1–12. doi:10.1111/j.1467-8616.1995.tb00095.x.
