= Schroedter =

Schroedter or Schrödter is a German-language surname. Notable people with the surname include:

- Adolf Schrödter (1805–1875), German painter and illustrator
- Erich Schroedter (1919–1994), German World War II soldier
- Elisabeth Schroedter (born 1959), German politician
- Fabian Schrödter (born 1982), German water polo player
- Franz Schroedter (1897–1968), German art director
