= Karl Schröder (canoeist) =

Sport
- Sport: Kayaking
- Event: Folding kayak
Medal record
Men's canoe slalom
Representing West Germany
World Championships
Bronze medal – third place	1957 Augsburg	Folding K-1 team

Karl Schröder is a retired West German slalom canoeist who competed from the mid-1950s to the mid-1960s. He won a bronze medal in the folding K-1 team event at the 1957 ICF Canoe Slalom World Championships in Augsburg.
