= Hans Schröder (artist) =

German artist

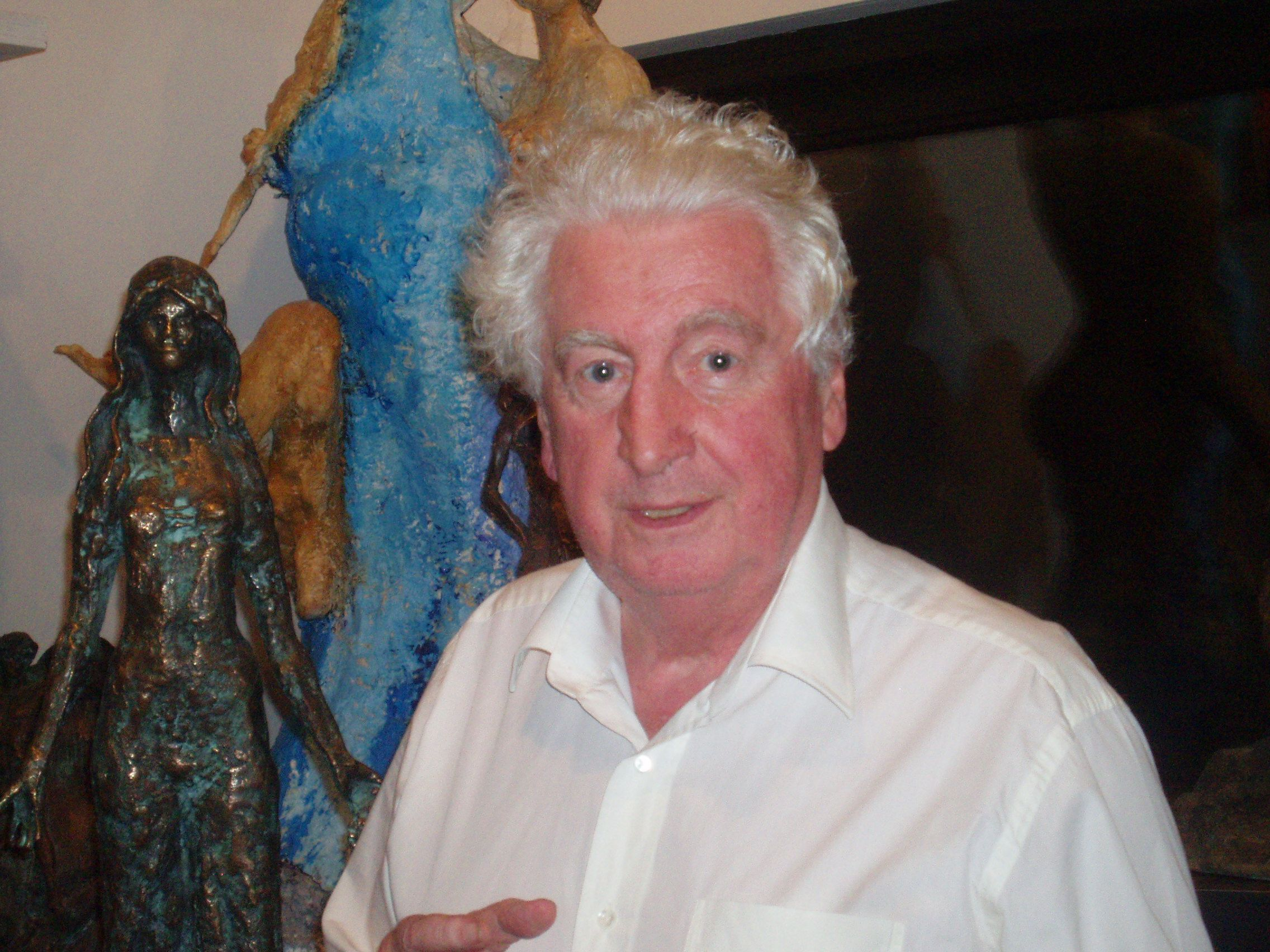
Schröder in 2007

Hans Schröder (28 July 1931 – 6 April 2010) was a German sculptor and painter. He was born in Saarbrücken.

== Awards ==
- 1953 Auszeichnung des Hanauer Goldschmiedehauses
- 1958 Ehrenpreis der École Française
- 1982 Albert-Weisgerber-Preis für Bildende Kunst der Stadt St. Ingbert
- 2001 Saarländischer Verdienstorden

== Literature ==
- Hans Schröder. Plastiken und Graphiken 1970 – 1980. München: Wolf, ca. 1980. 84 S., Abb.
- Hans Schröder. [Ausstellungskat. Moderne Galerie des Saarland-Museums]. Dillingen: Krüger, 1982. 131 S., zahlr. Abb.
- Hans Schröder – Plastiken, Zeichnungen, Fotocollagen u. Gemälde 1950–1988. Freren: Luca Verlag, 1989. 272 S., zahlr. Abb. ISBN 3-923641-15-X
- Hans Schröder [Mit einem Vorwort des Künstlers]. o.O., Verl. u. Jahr. 47 S., zahlr. Farbabb.
