= Schreuder =

Schreuder is a Dutch occupational surname. Schreuder, from early Middle Dutch scrodere, is an archaic term for either a taylor or a porter (dock-worker, barrow-man). People with this surname include:

- Alfred Schreuder (born 1972), Dutch footballer
- Dick Schreuder (born 1971), Dutch footballer
- Frances Schreuder (1938–2004), American murderer
- Hans Paludan Smith Schreuder (1817–1882), Norwegian missionary
- Hein Schreuder (1951–2023), Dutch economist and strategist
- Hinkelien Schreuder (born 1984), Dutch swimmer
- Jan Schreuder (1704–1764), Dutch governor of Ceylon
- Louis Schreuder (born 1990), South African rugby player
- Morné Schreuder (born 1979), Namibian rugby player
- Pieter Meindert Schreuder (1912–1945), Dutch World War II resistance leader
