= Soren Schroder =

Danish businessman

- Born: Søren Wølck Schrøder; 1962 or 1963 (age 63–64); Aarhus, Denmark
- Education: Connecticut College
- Occupation: businessman
- Title: CEO, Bunge Limited
- Term: June 2013-
- Predecessor: Alberto Weisser

Søren Wølck Schrøder (born 1962/63) is a Danish businessman, the CEO of Bunge Limited, a global agribusiness and food company, since June 2013.

== Early life ==
Søren Wølck Schrøder was born in Aarhus in Denmark, but moved to the United States to study at Connecticut College, where he received a bachelor's degree in economics.

== Career ==
After finishing his bachelor's degree, Schroder worked for Continental Grain for more for than ten years and then transferred to Cargill for a shorter period. From 1997 to 2000, Schroder was a board member of the Danish company Scanola, but otherwise he has worked exclusively abroad.

He has worked for Bunge since 2000, initially as Protein Director at Bunge Global Markets. From 2010 to 2013 he was CEO of Bunge North America. He became CEO of Bunge Limited in June 2013, succeeding Alberto Weisser. On December 10, 2018, Bunge announced Soren will be stepping down as CEO as soon as a replacement has been found.
