= Hans Schröder (footballer) =

German footballer

Personal information
- Full name: Hans Schröder
- Date of birth: 4 September 1906
- Place of birth: Berlin, German Empire
- Date of death: 6 January 1970 (aged 63)
- Place of death: West Germany
- Position: Forward

Senior career*
Years	Team	Apps	(Gls)
1925–1935	Tennis Borussia Berlin		

International career
1926	Germany	1	(0)
- * Club domestic league appearances and goals

Hans Schröder (4 September 1906 – 6 January 1970), nicknamed Hanne, was a German footballer who played as a forward and made one appearance for the Germany national team.

== Career ==
Schröder earned his first and only cap for Germany on 18 April 1926 in a friendly against the Netherlands. The home match, which was played in Düsseldorf, finished as a 4–2 win for Germany.

== Personal life ==
Schröder died on 6 January 1970 at the age of 63.

== Career statistics ==
=== International ===
Germany
Year	Apps	Goals
1926	1	0
Total	1	0
