= Gerhard Schröder (television executive) =

German media executive (1921–2012)

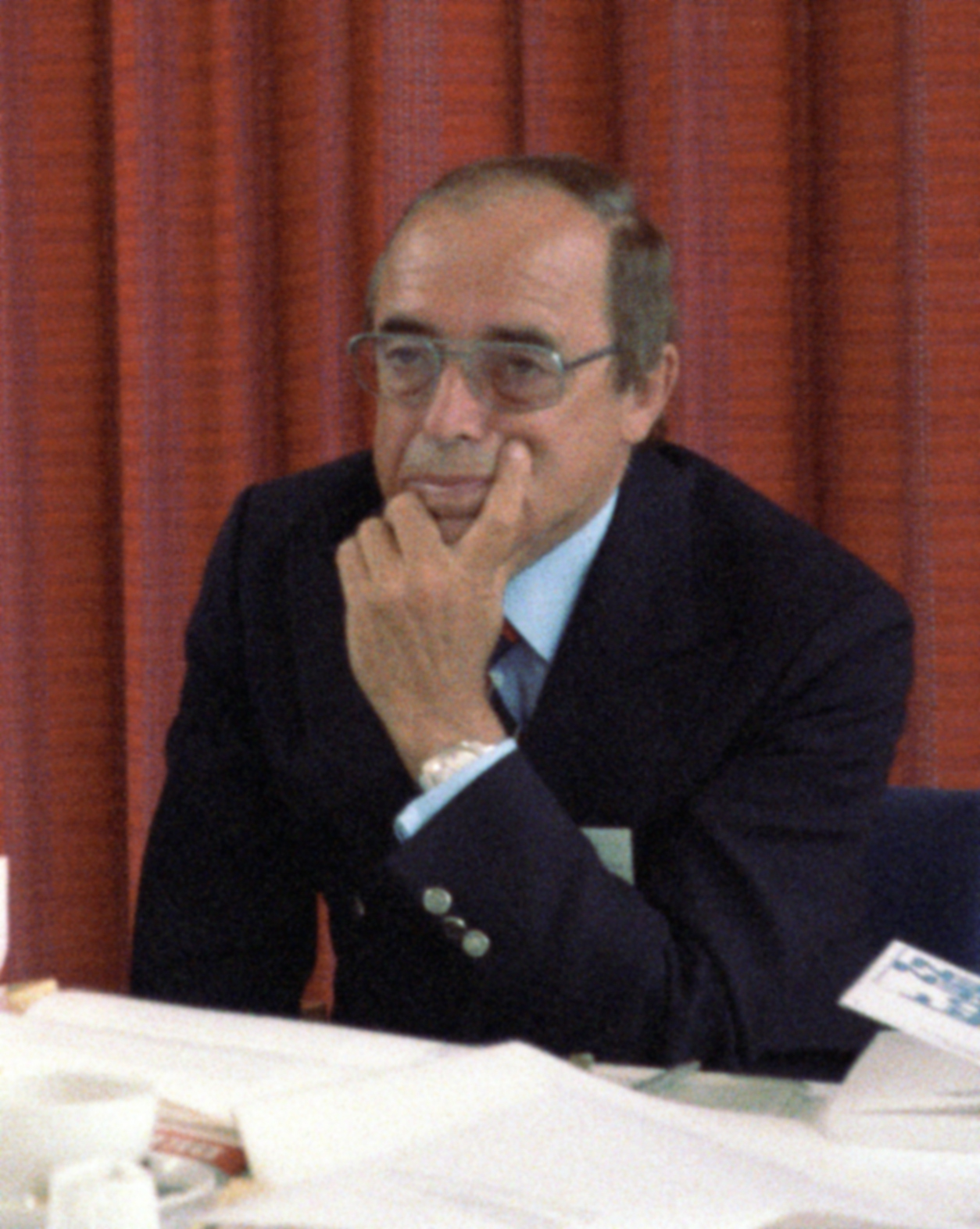
Gerhard Schröder

Gerhard Karl Theodor Hans Schröder (3 March 1921 – 23 January 2012) was a German radio and television executive.

Schröder was born in Bad Wildungen and studied law and political economics in Marburg. After his state examination he worked in the Lower Saxony Ministry of Culture, among other roles as leader of the Art and Culture Department.

From 1961 to 1973 he was director of the Norddeutscher Rundfunk, having been a member of the governing body for six years. As the head of NDR, in 1970–71 he served as chairman of the ARD.

In 1974 he switched to director of Radio Bremen, where he served until 1985. In his time there, among other things, the regional television news magazine Buten un binnen was launched in 1980.
