= Carl Schroeder (composer) =

American composer and writer

Carl Schroeder is an American composer and writer based in Minnesota.

His works of music include "88 Keys," a composition for solo piano using the instrument's 88 keys once each; the orchestral elegy "Christine's Lullaby"; "Two December Carols," a set of two holiday carols for accompanied choir; "Spin," a concert band work inspired by biking trips on the Root River State Trail in southeastern Minnesota; and "Lake Harriet Bandshell Blues," a concert band work that celebrates the outdoor bandshell performance venue at Lake Harriet (Minnesota). He is also the author of two books in the "Fenn and Zorro" series of novels told through correspondence.
