= Karl Schröder I =

German violinist and viola player

Karl Schröder (17 March 1816 Oberbosa, Thuringia – 21 April 1890 Berlin) was a German violinist and viola player. He became first a town musician at Quedlinburg and then music director at Neuhaldensleben. He played the viola until 1866 in the family string quartet which also included his two sons Franz Hermann Schröder and Karl Schröder II. The quartet was extremely popular and toured throughout Europe to critical acclaim.

== Sources ==
- Andrew D. McCredie. The New Grove Dictionary of Opera, edited by Stanley Sadie (1992), ISBN 0-333-73432-7 and ISBN 1-56159-228-5
