= Karl Schröder II =

German cellist and composer

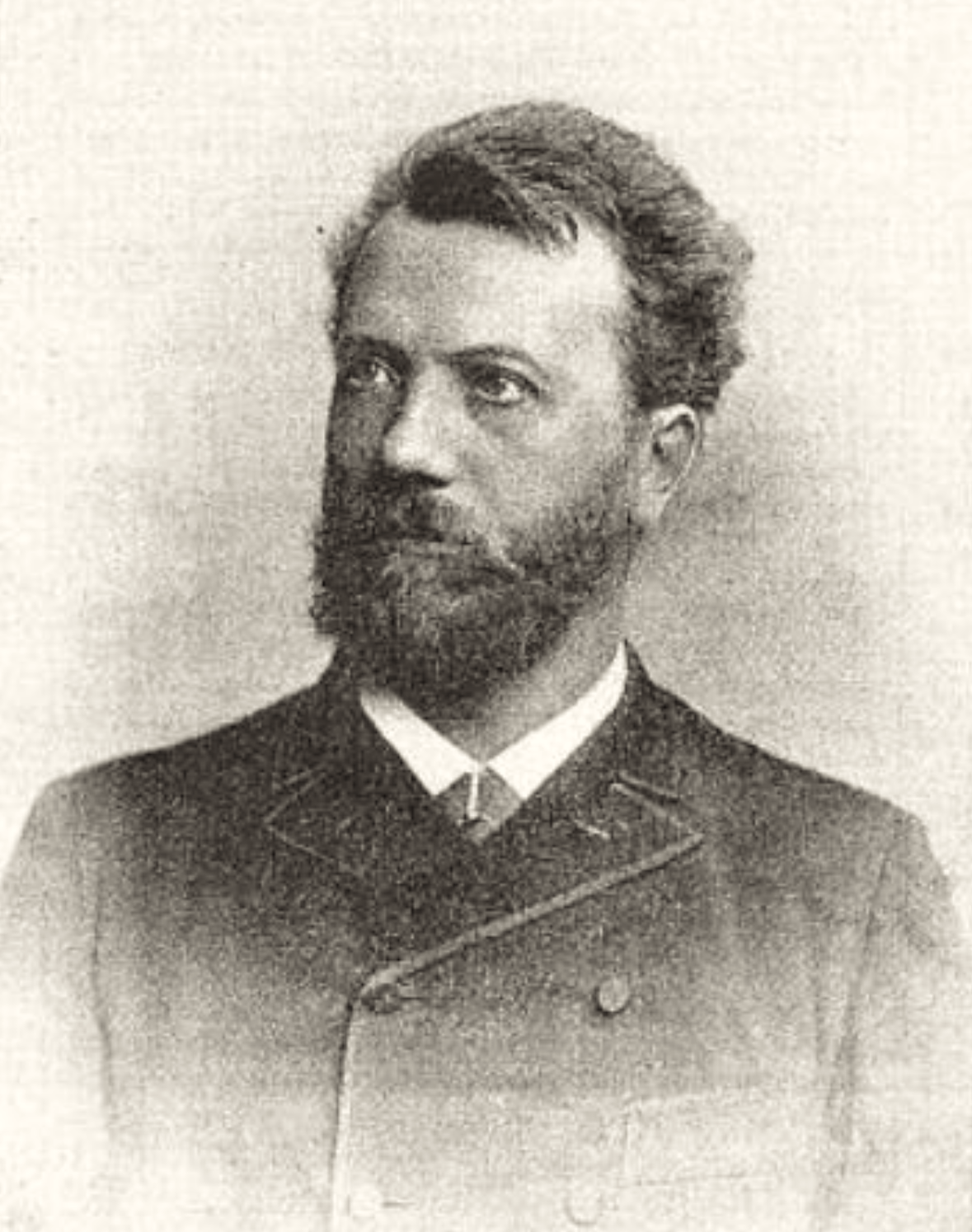
1890 photograph of Carl Schroeder

Karl Schröder II, also given as Carl Schroeder, (18 December 1848, Quedlinburg – 22 September 1935, Bremen) was a German cellist, composer and conductor, and son of violinist Karl Schröder.

He studied as a child with his father and with Karl Drechsler in Dessau. He had three brothers, Carl Hermann Schroeder (1843-1909), who became a composer and violin professor in Berlin, Franz Schröder (before 1855-?) would work as a conductor in St. Petersburg, Russia, and the youngest brother, Alwin Schroeder (1855-1928) was a German-American cellist best known as leading cellist in the Boston Symphony. In his early youth Karl studied with Friedrich Kiel and was appointed to the Sondershausen Hofkapelle at the age of 14. He toured Europe with his family's acclaimed string quartet traveling throughout Germany, Italy, France, Belgium, and even as far as St. Petersburg. In 1872 he was appointed Kapellmeister of the Kroll Oper in Berlin; late that year, the string quartet was disbanded on his appointment to the Brunswick Hofkapelle commencing in 1873. A year later he became solo cellist of the Leipzig Gewandhaus Orchestra and professor at the conservatory. He returned to Sondershausen in 1881, replacing Max Erdmannsdörfer as Hofkapellmeister and founding a music school; this he sold to A. Schultze in 1886 when he was appointed conductor of the Duitse Opera in Rotterdam. He held similar posts in Berlin (1887) and in Hamburg (1888), where he succeeded Joseph Sucher at the Neues Stadt Theater. His former music school having become a state conservatory, he returned to Sondershausen in 1890 as its director, remaining until 1909. In 1911 he took up his last post, as professor at the Stern Conservatory in Berlin, where he remained for more than a decade before retiring to Bremen. Schröder's compositions include symphonic works, chamber music pieces, string quartets, songs for solo instruments, two operas and an operetta. In addition to his compositions and educational works he produced careful editions of Classical cello pieces.

== Sources ==
- The New Grove Dictionary of Opera, edited by Stanley Sadie (1992), ISBN 0-333-73432-7 and ISBN 1-56159-228-5
