= Fuglsø =

Village in Syddjurs Municipality, Denmark

Coordinates: 56°12′N 10°32′E

Fuglsø (Danish for Birds Lake; Danish pronunciation: [fʊlsø]) is a minor town in Denmark placed in the national park of Mols Bjerge. It is mostly visited as a summer house place by people from Germany, Norway and Denmark. The municipality of Fuglsø is Syddjurs Municipality and it lies in the Central Denmark Region

== Settlement ==
Not many people live in Fuglsø due to it being a summer vacation town, although some also spend the winter holidays there. A few farms such as Sølballegaard lie there, but are now for sale. The Fuglsøcenteret (Fulgsø Center) is the only hotel in Fulgsø. The Fulgsøcenteret used to be a gym owned by DGI, but they sold it in October 2011, however the Fuglsøcenteret still has a lot of sport events.

== Attractions ==
Many people go to Ebeltoft by day, because of attractions such as Fregatten Jylland, Glasmuseet Ebeltoft and Ree Park – Ebeltoft Safari. Around Fuglsø lies Trehøje and Tinghulen, but the only attraction Fuglsø has got to offer is the nature and the beach, Fuglsø Strand.
