= Museum ship =

Ship preserved and converted into a museum open to the public

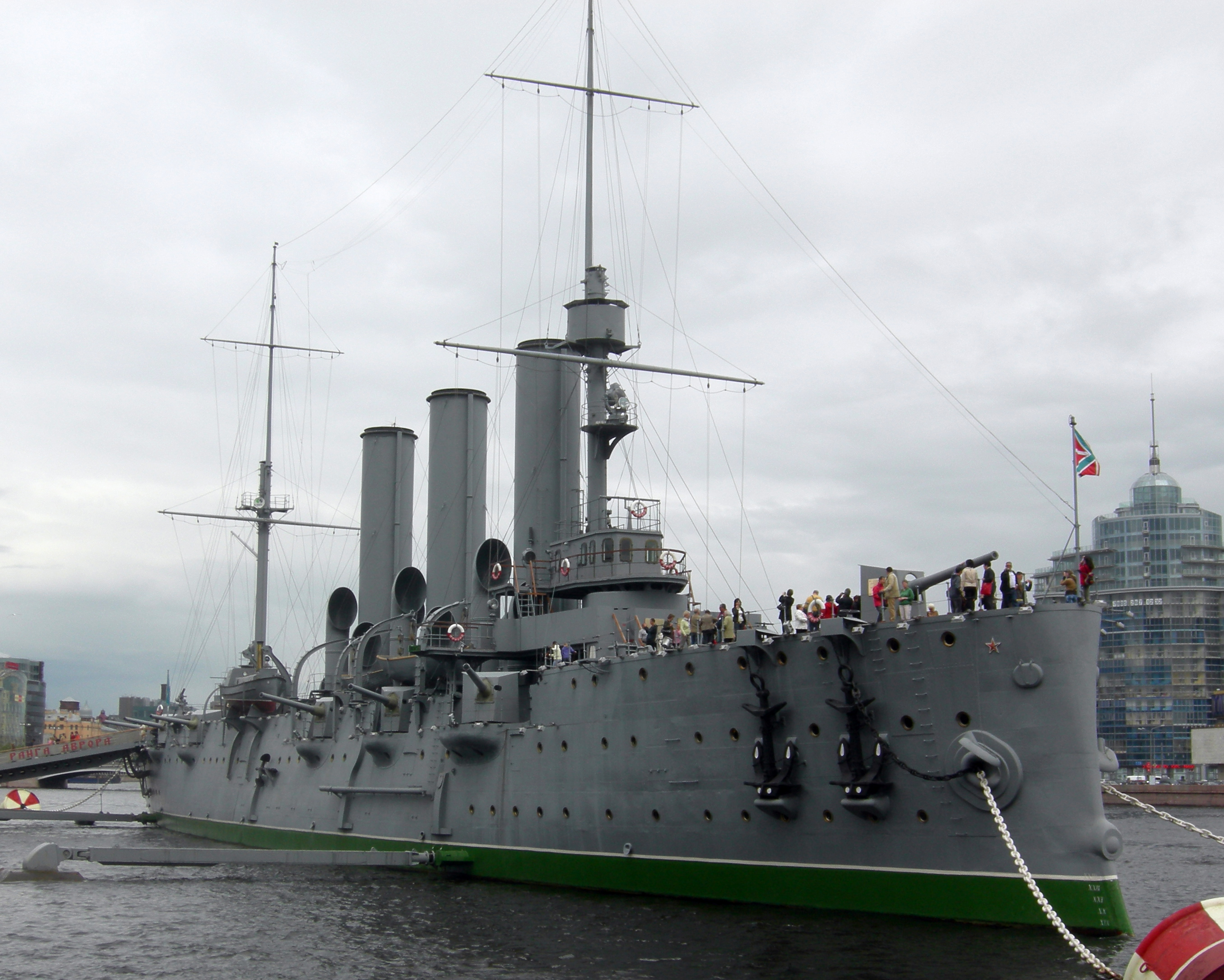
The Russian Aurora, one of the few protected cruisers to be preserved, is one of the world's most visited vessels

A museum ship, also called a memorial ship, is a ship that has been preserved and converted into a museum open to the public for educational or memorial purposes. Some are also used for training and recruitment purposes, mostly for the small number of museum ships that are still operational and thus capable of regular movement.

Several hundred museum ships are kept around the world, with around 175 of them organised in the Historic Naval Ships Association though many are not naval museum ships, from general merchant ships to tugs and lightships. Many museum ships are also associated with a maritime museum.

== Significance ==
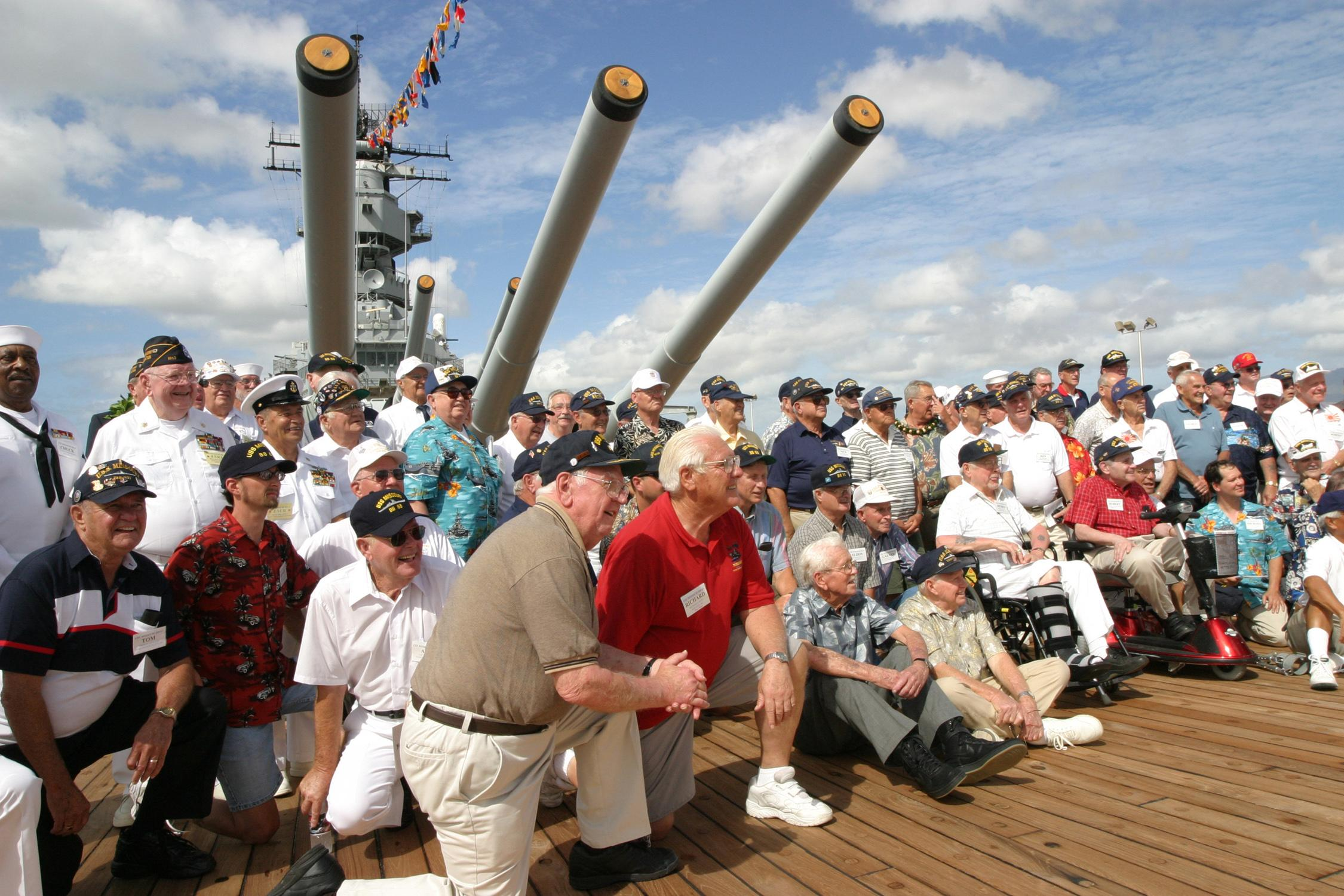
Former crew members of USS Missouri pose for photos after the Anniversary of the End of World War II ceremony in 2003.

Relatively few ships are preserved beyond their useful life, due to the high cost of maintaining them against the ravages of the elements. Most are broken up and sold for scrap, while a relative handful are sunk as naval target practice, scuttled to create artificial reefs, and so on. Some survive because of historical significance, but more often due to luck and circumstance. Since an old ship tied up at dockside, without attention, still decays and eventually sinks, the practice of recent years has been to form some sort of preservation society, solicit donations from governments or private individuals, organize volunteer labor from the enthusiasts, and open the restored ship to visitors, usually for a fee.

For instance, the rigging of sailing ships has almost never survived, and so the rigging plan must be reconstructed from various sources. Studying museum ships allows historians to analyze how life on and operation of the ships took place. Numerous scientific papers have been written on ship restoration and maintenance, and international conferences are held discussing the latest developments. Some years ago, the Barcelona Charter was signed by a variety of international owner organizations of traditional vessels, and provides certain accepted minimum criteria for the restoration and operation of traditional watercraft still in operation.

Another consideration is the distinction between a "real" museum ship, and a ship replica. As repairs accumulate over time, less and less of the ship is of the original materials, and the lack of old parts (or even "appropriate" work tools) may lead to the use of modern "short-cuts" (such as welding a metal plate instead of riveting it, as would be the case during the ships' historical period). Visitors without historical background are also often unable to distinguish between a historical museum ship and a ship replica, which may serve solely as a tourist attraction.

== Museum usage ==
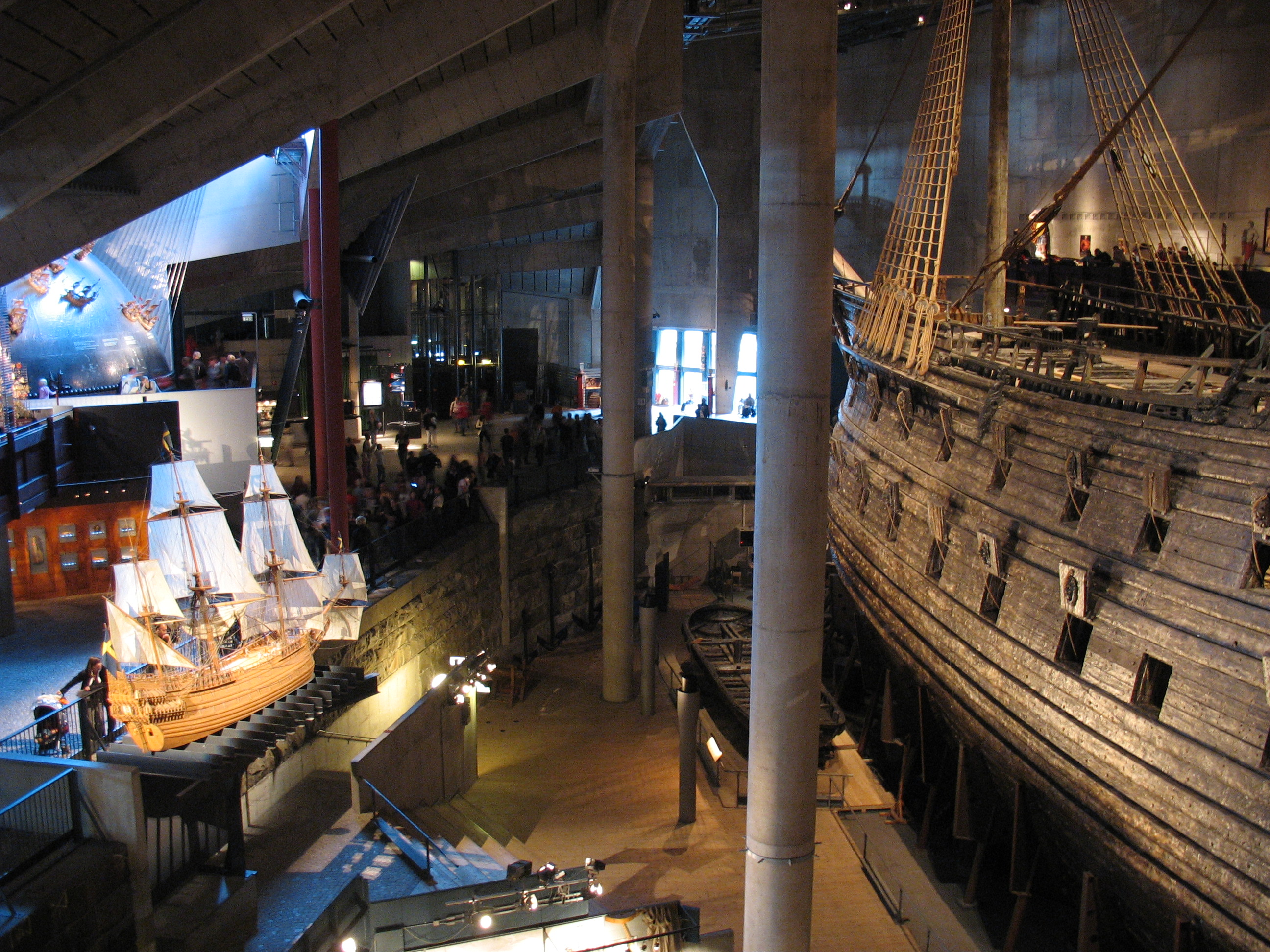
The 17th-century warship Vasa on display in the Vasa Museum

In some cases, the ships radio room has been brought back into use, with volunteers operating amateur radio equipment. Often, the callsign assigned is a variation on the original identification of the ship. For example, the submarine USS Cobia, which had the callsign NBQV, is now on the air as NB9QV. The World War II submarine USS Pampanito, berthed at the San Francisco Maritime National Historical Park, had the active service callsign NJVT and is now on the air as NJ6VT. In other cases, such as USS Missouri, a distinctive call (in this case KH6BB) is used. This radio work not only helps restore part of the vessel, but also provides worldwide publicity for the museum ship.

When the United States Navy turns over one of their ships to a museum, a contract must be signed, stating that the Navy bears no responsibility for the costs of restoration, preservation and maintenance. Also, major pieces of equipment such as engines and generators must be permanently disabled. If the ship requires services such as electricity and water, they must come through shore connections.

A number of the larger museum ships have begun to offer hosting for weddings, meetings, other events, and sleepovers, and on a few ships still seaworthy, cruises. In the United States, this includes USS Constitution's annual "turnaround", when the old ship is towed out into the harbor and brought back in facing the other way, so as to weather evenly. A place on the deck is by invitation or lottery only, and highly prized.

== Gallery ==
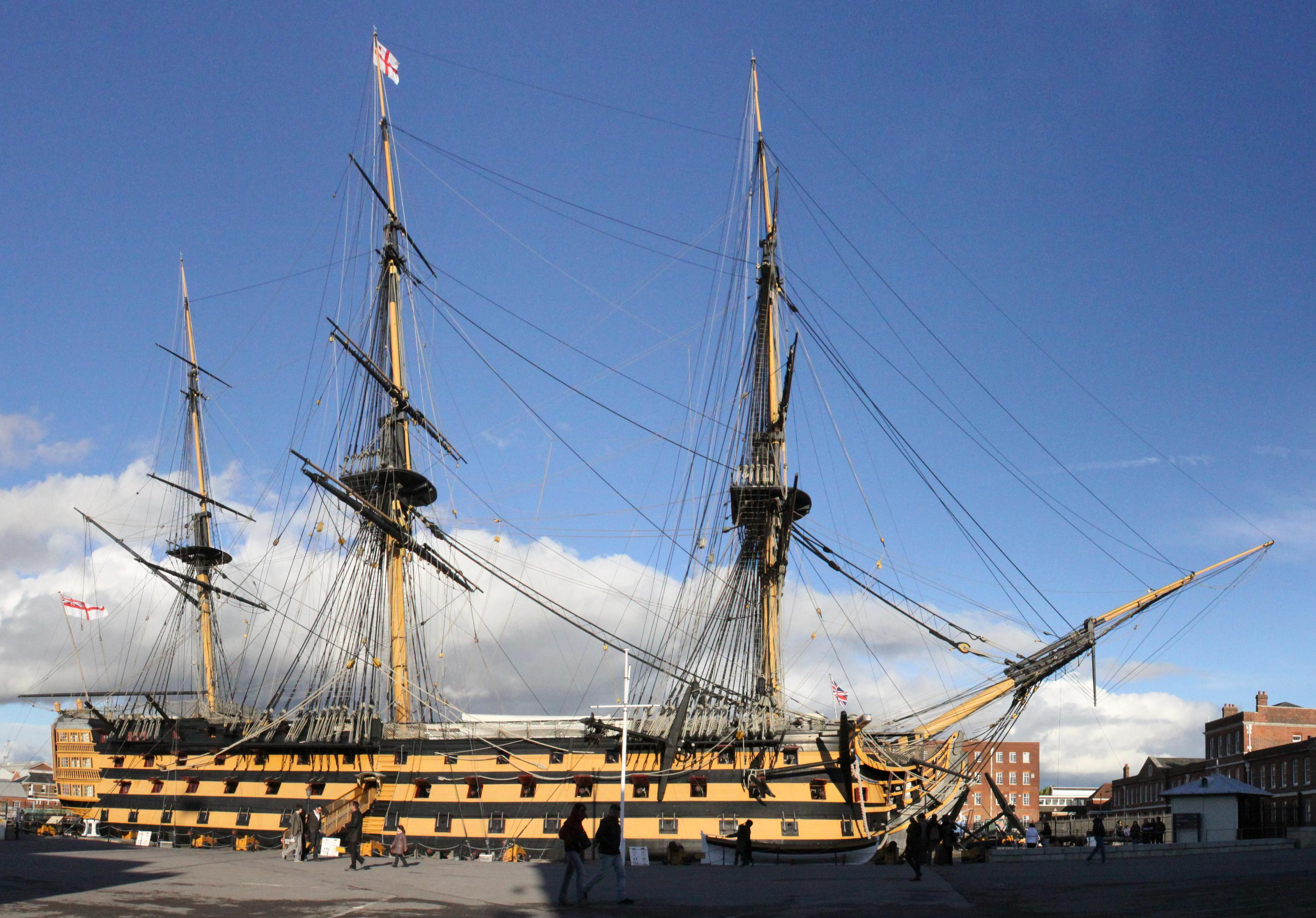
HMS Victory: the only surviving ship of the line, preserved in Portsmouth.

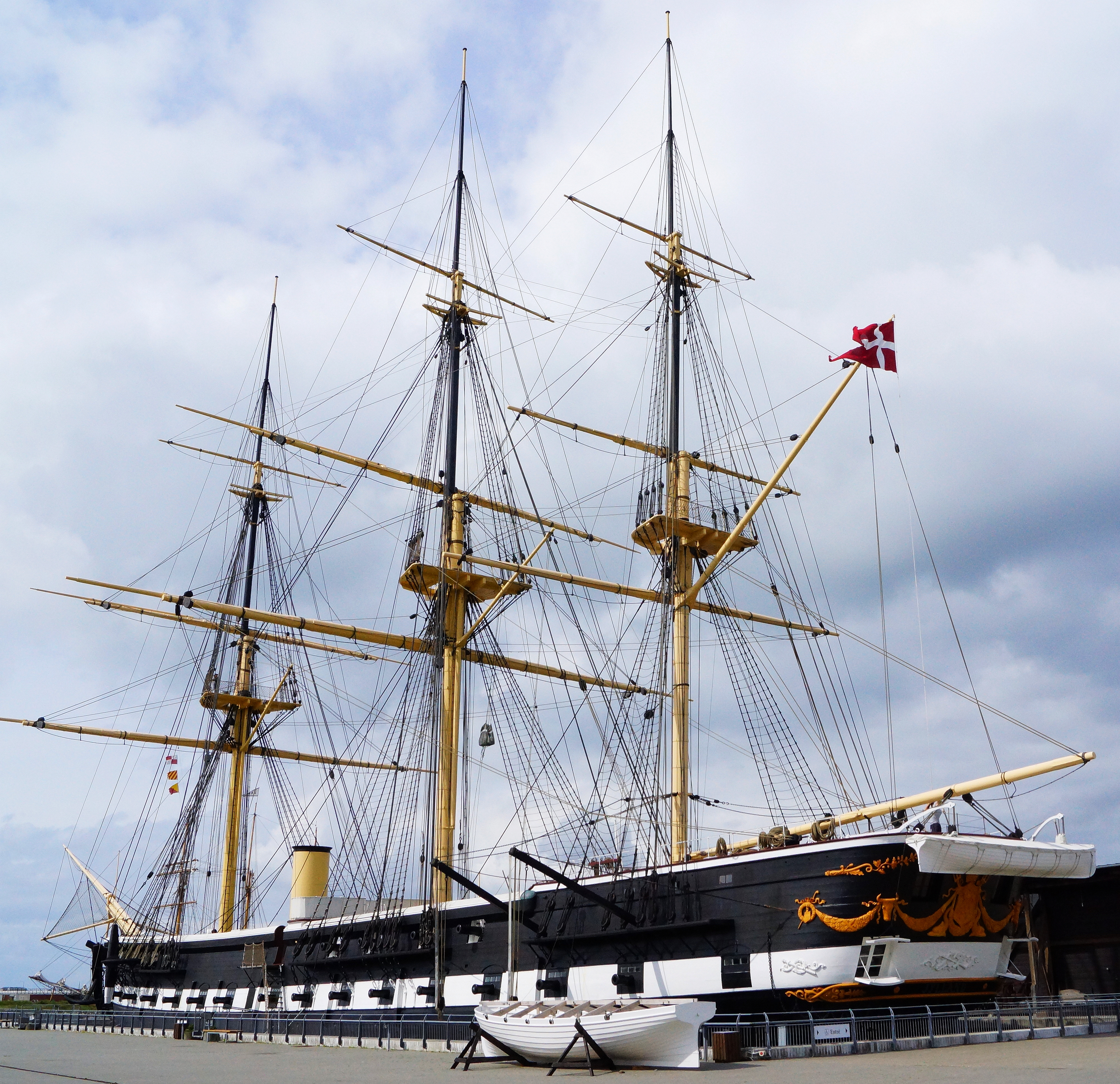
Jylland: the only surviving wooden screw frigate, preserved in Ebeltoft.

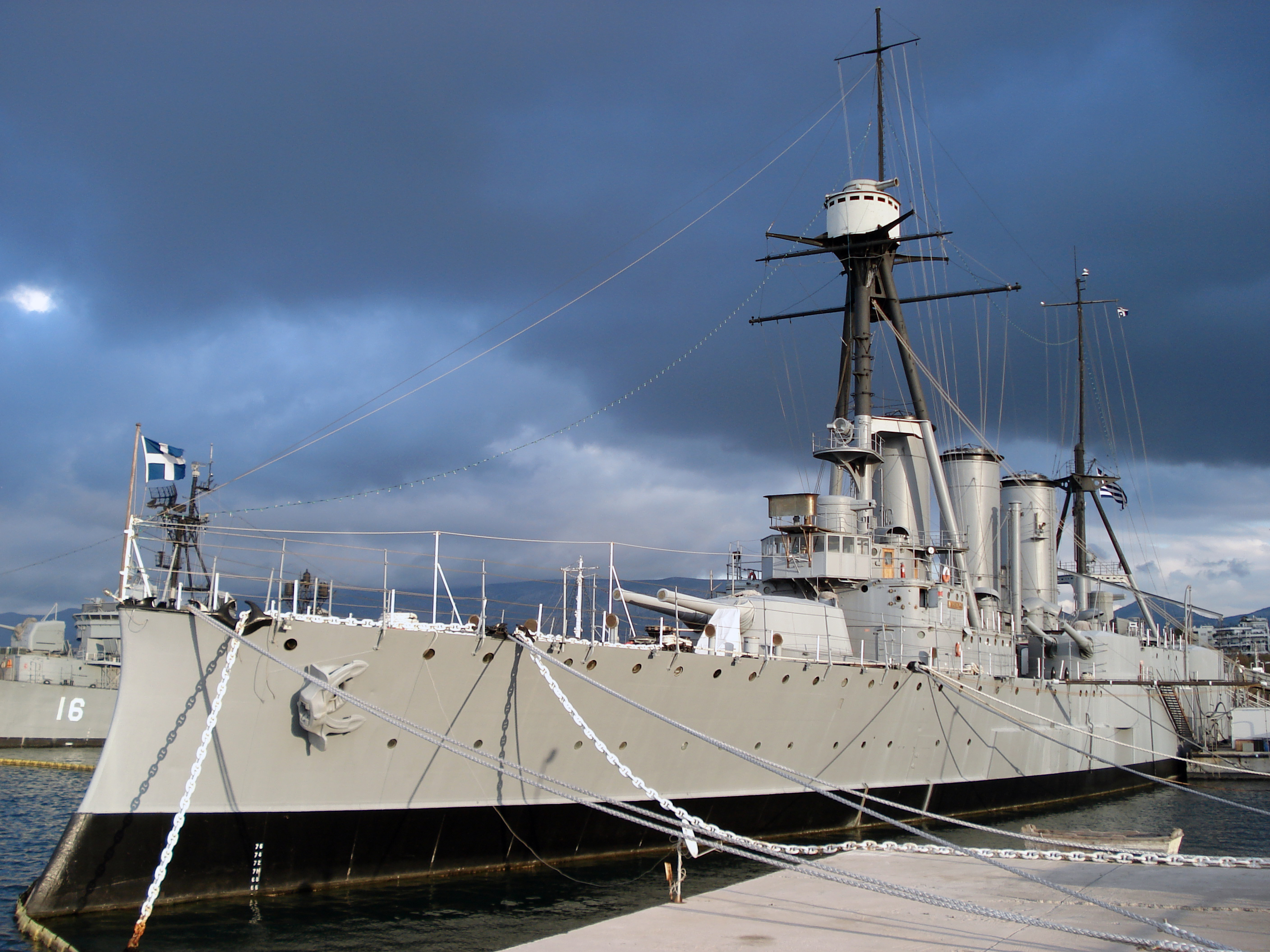
Georgios Averof: the only surviving armored cruiser, preserved in Athens.

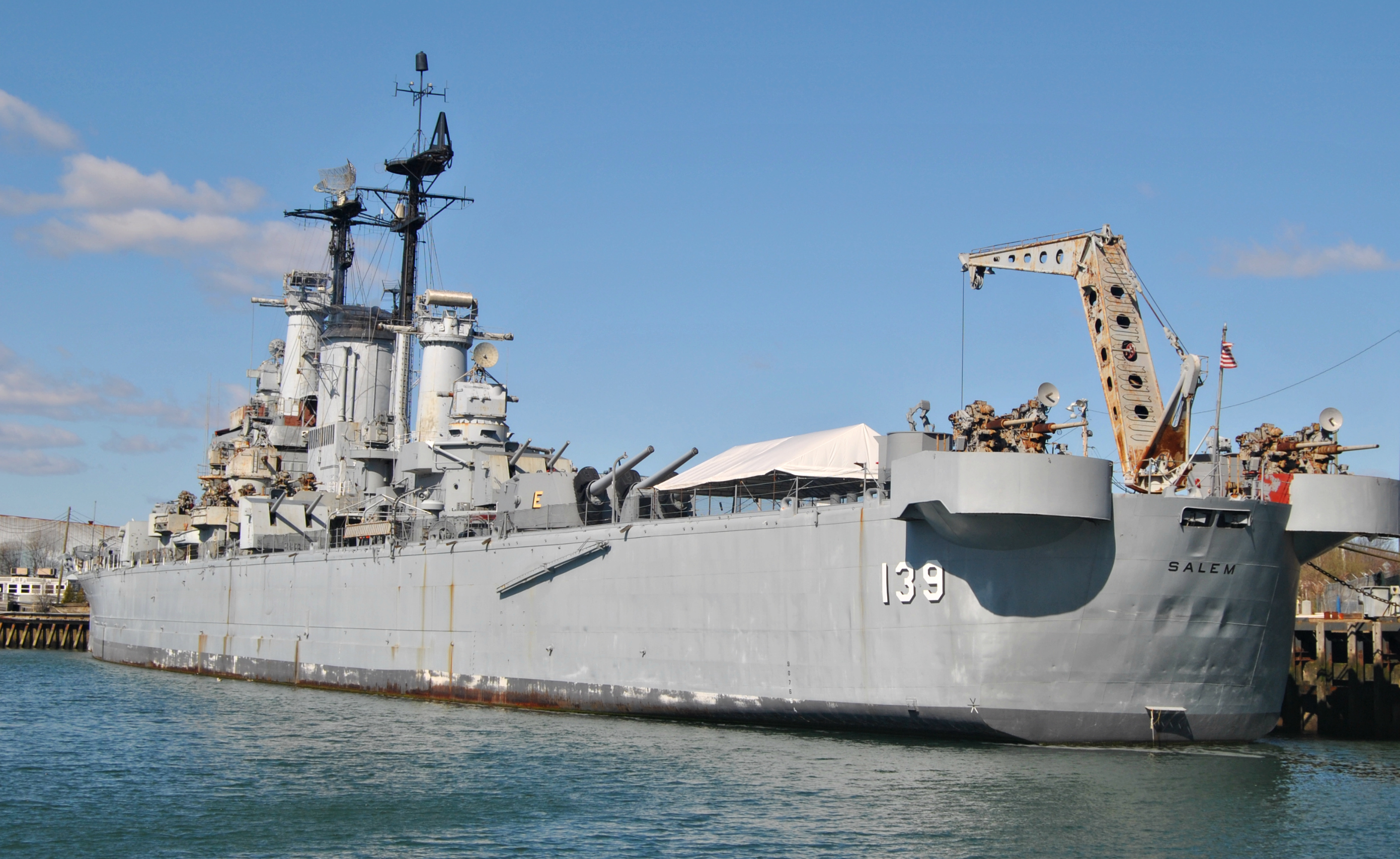
USS Salem: the only surviving heavy cruiser, preserved in Quincy, MA.

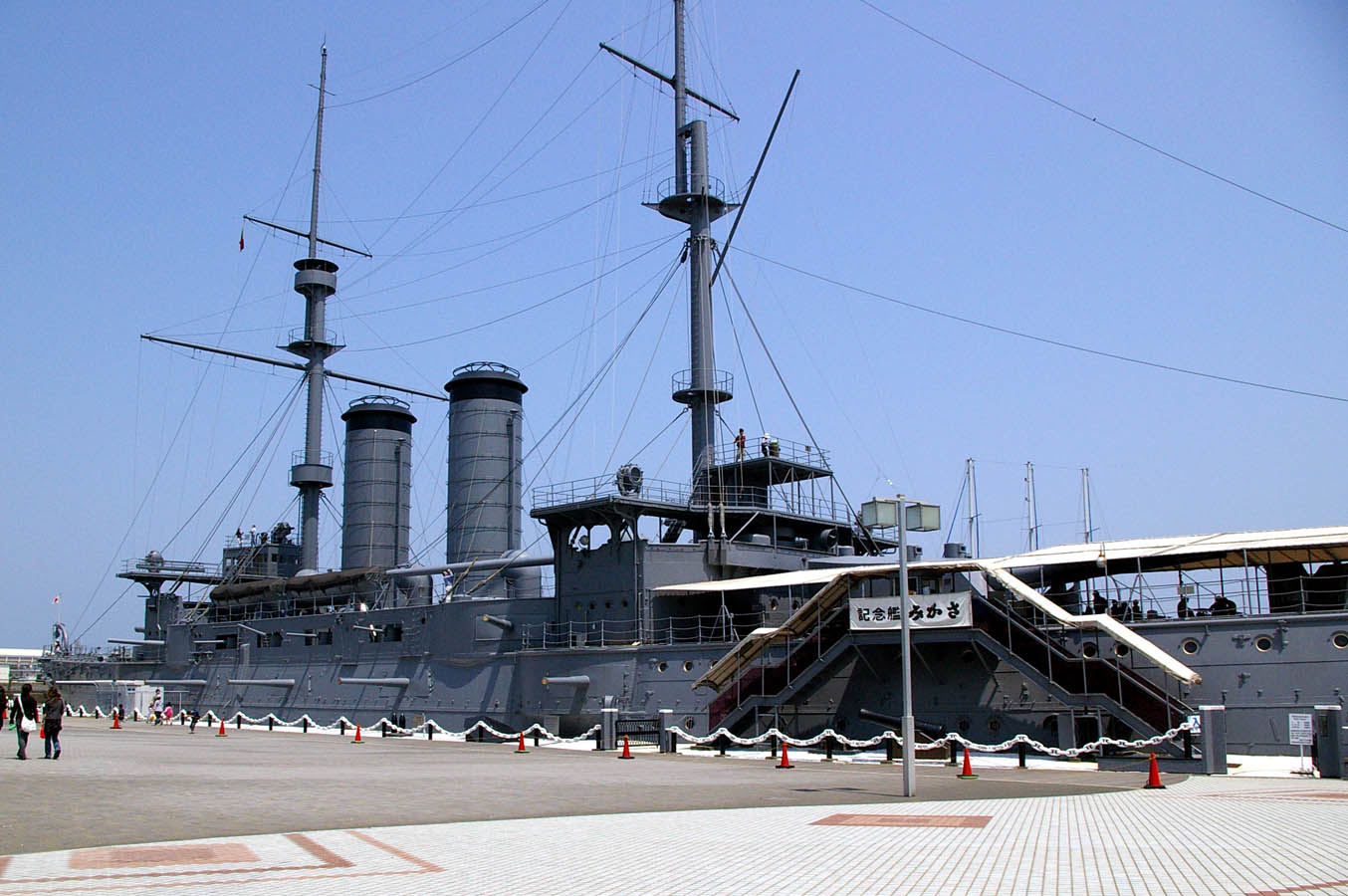
Mikasa: the only surviving pre-dreadnought battleship, preserved in Yokosuka.

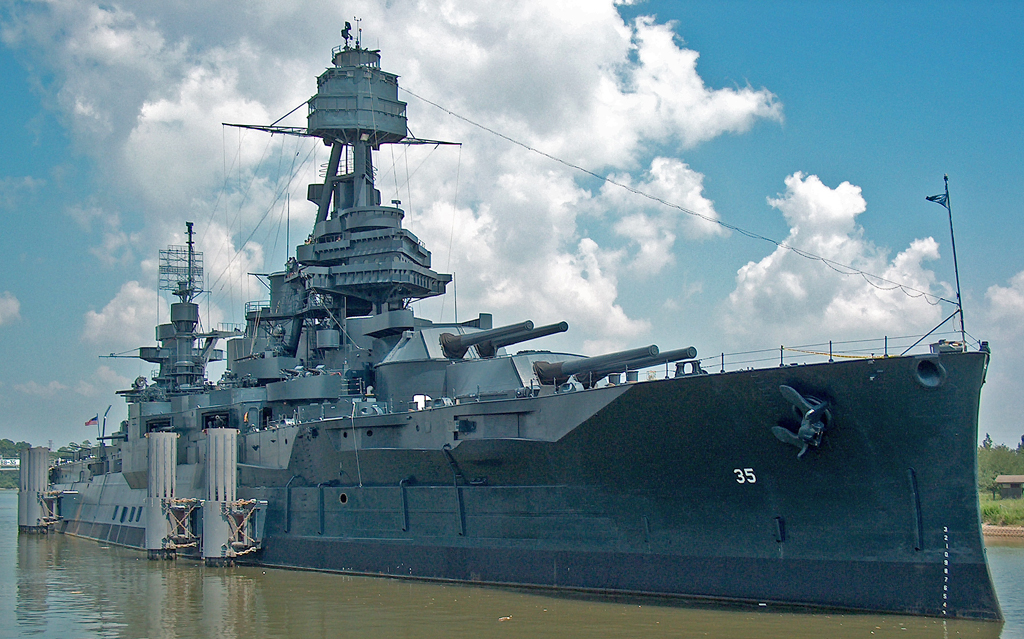
USS Texas: the only surviving dreadnought battleship, to be preserved in Galveston, TX.

U-995: World War II German submarine, preserved in Laboe.

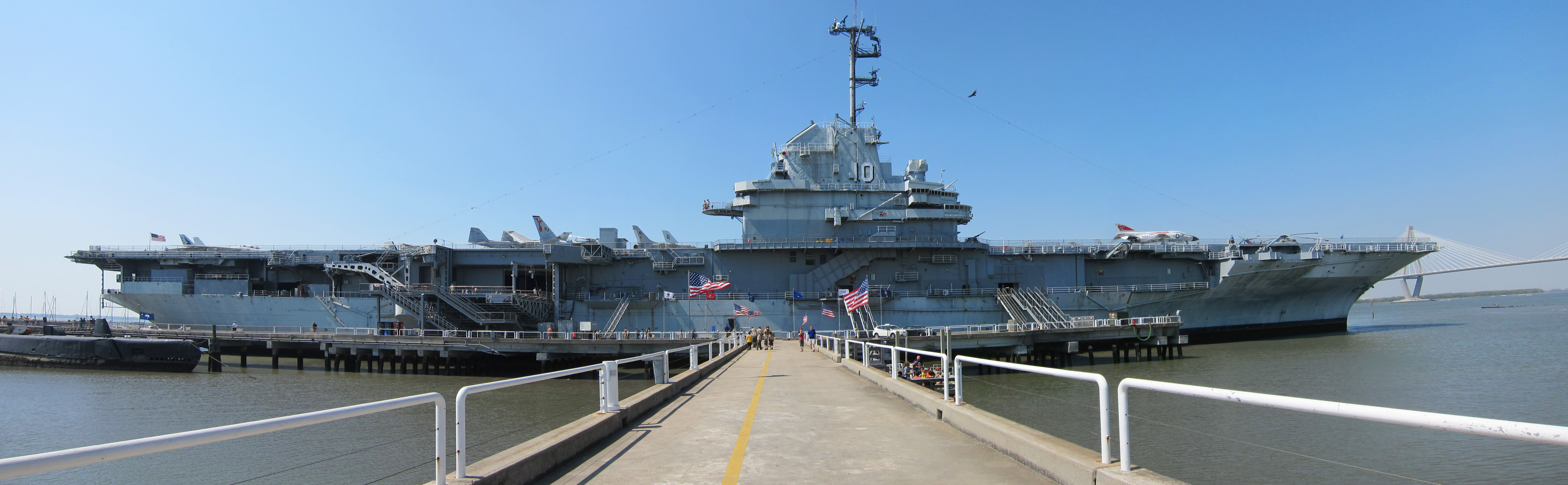
USS Yorktown: the first aircraft carrier converted into a museum, preserved in Charleston, SC.

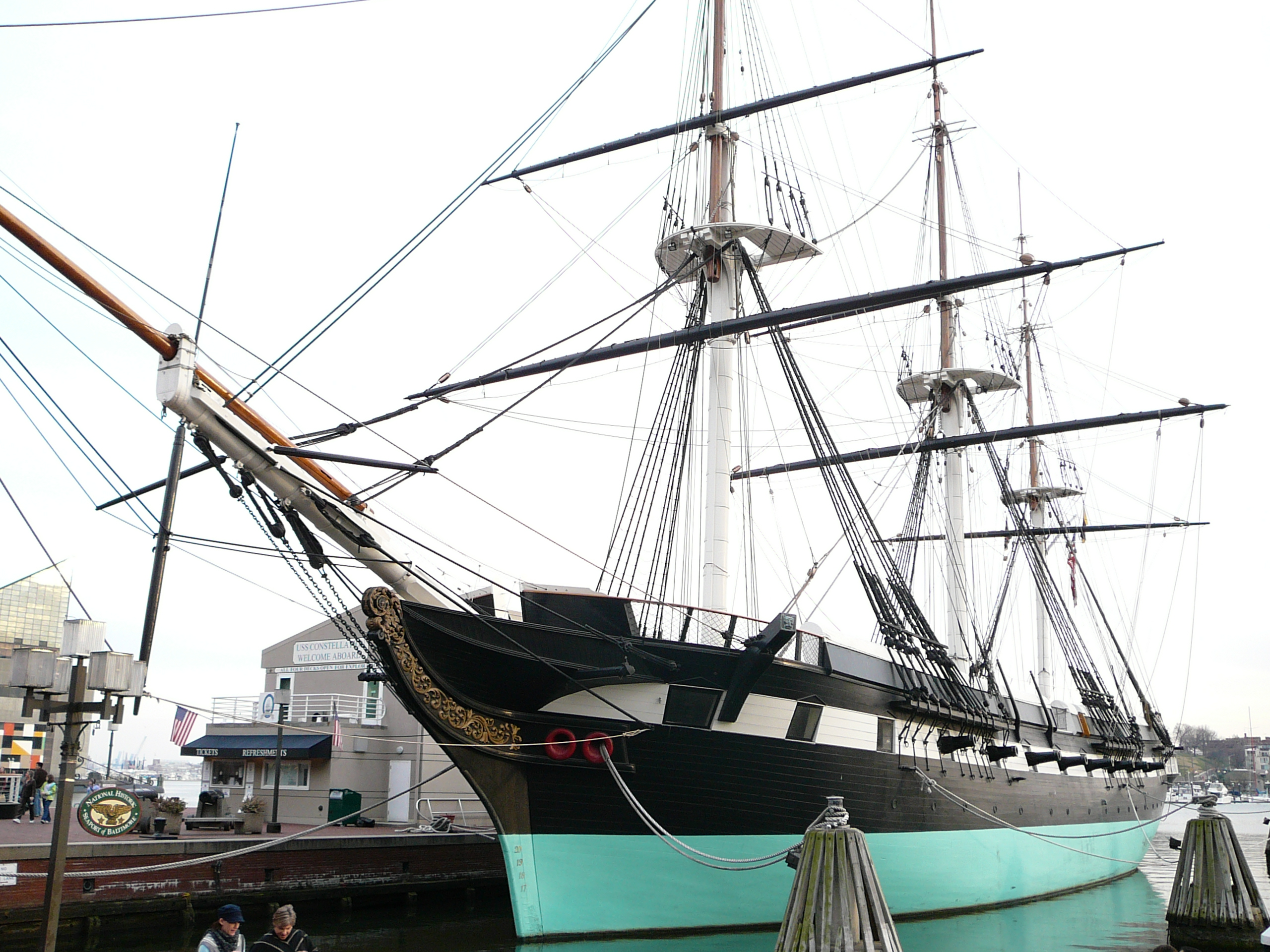
USS Constellation: sloop-of-war, the last sail-only warship designed and built by the United States Navy, preserved as a museum ship in Baltimore, MD.

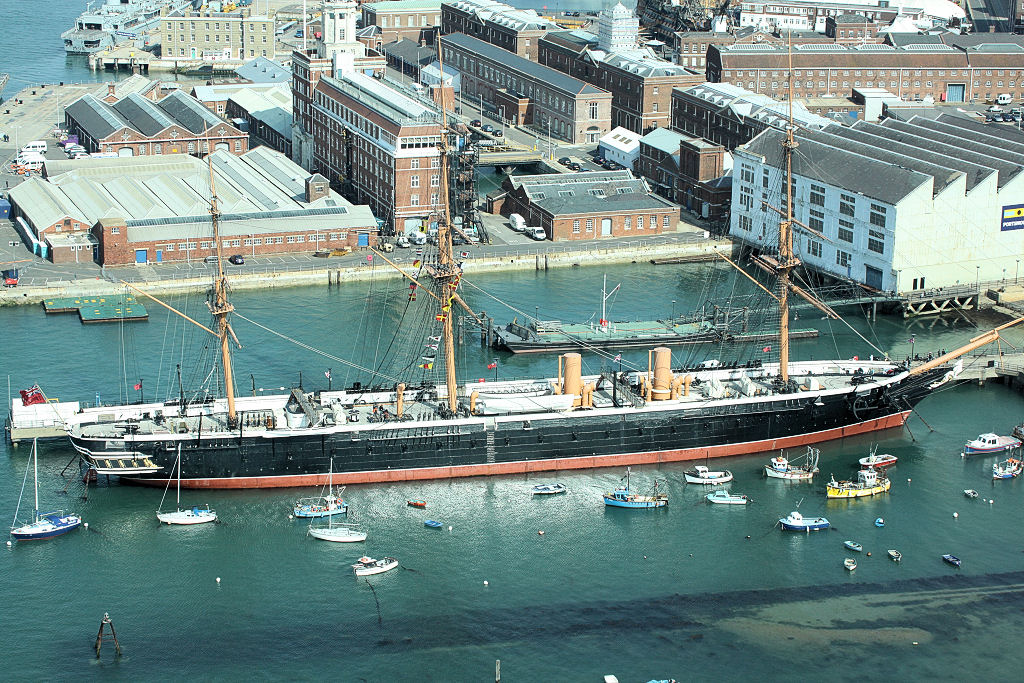
HMS Warrior: the world's first iron-hulled warship, preserved in Portsmouth.

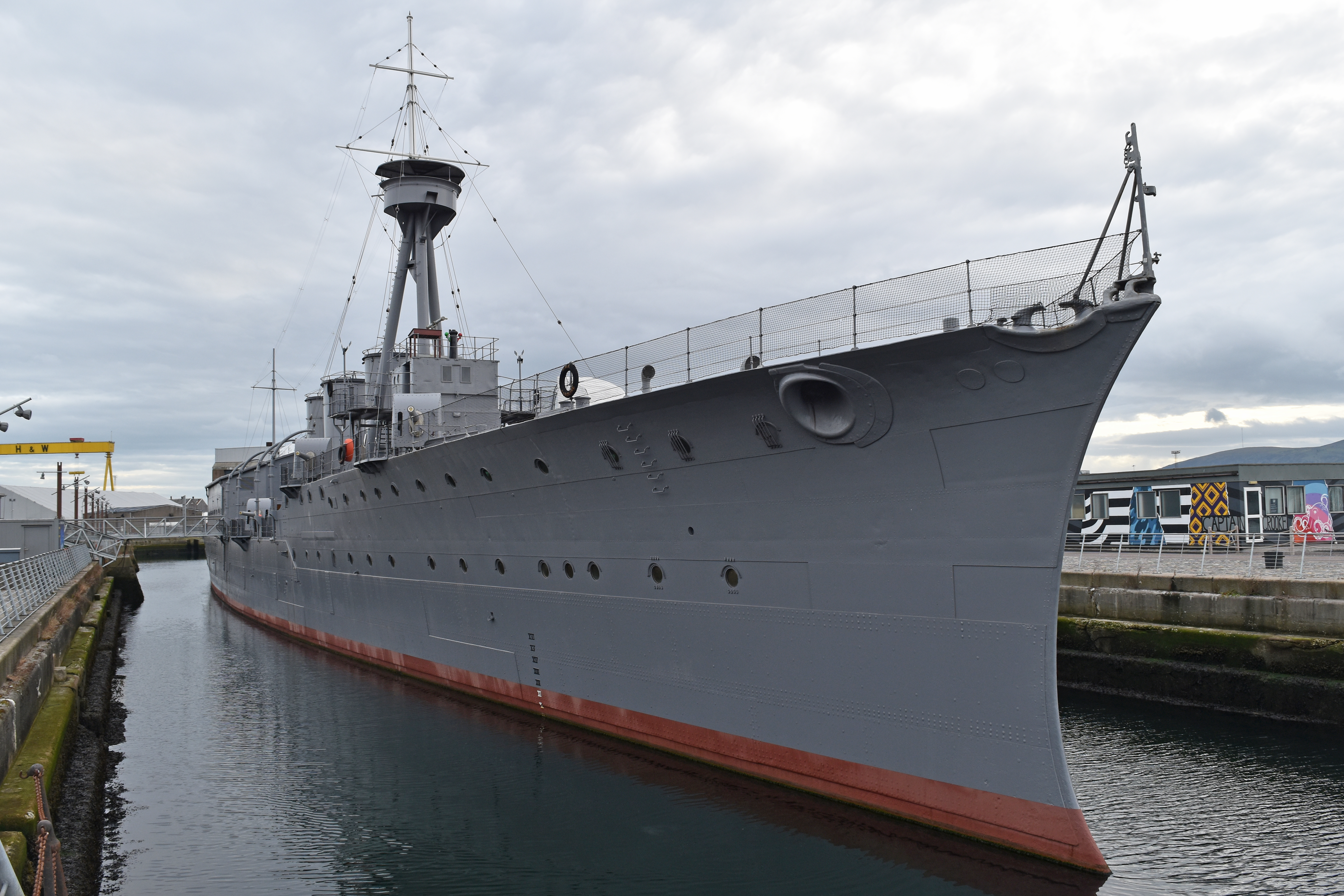
HMS Caroline: WW1 light cruiser, the only surviving ship from The Battle of Jutland, preserved in Belfast.

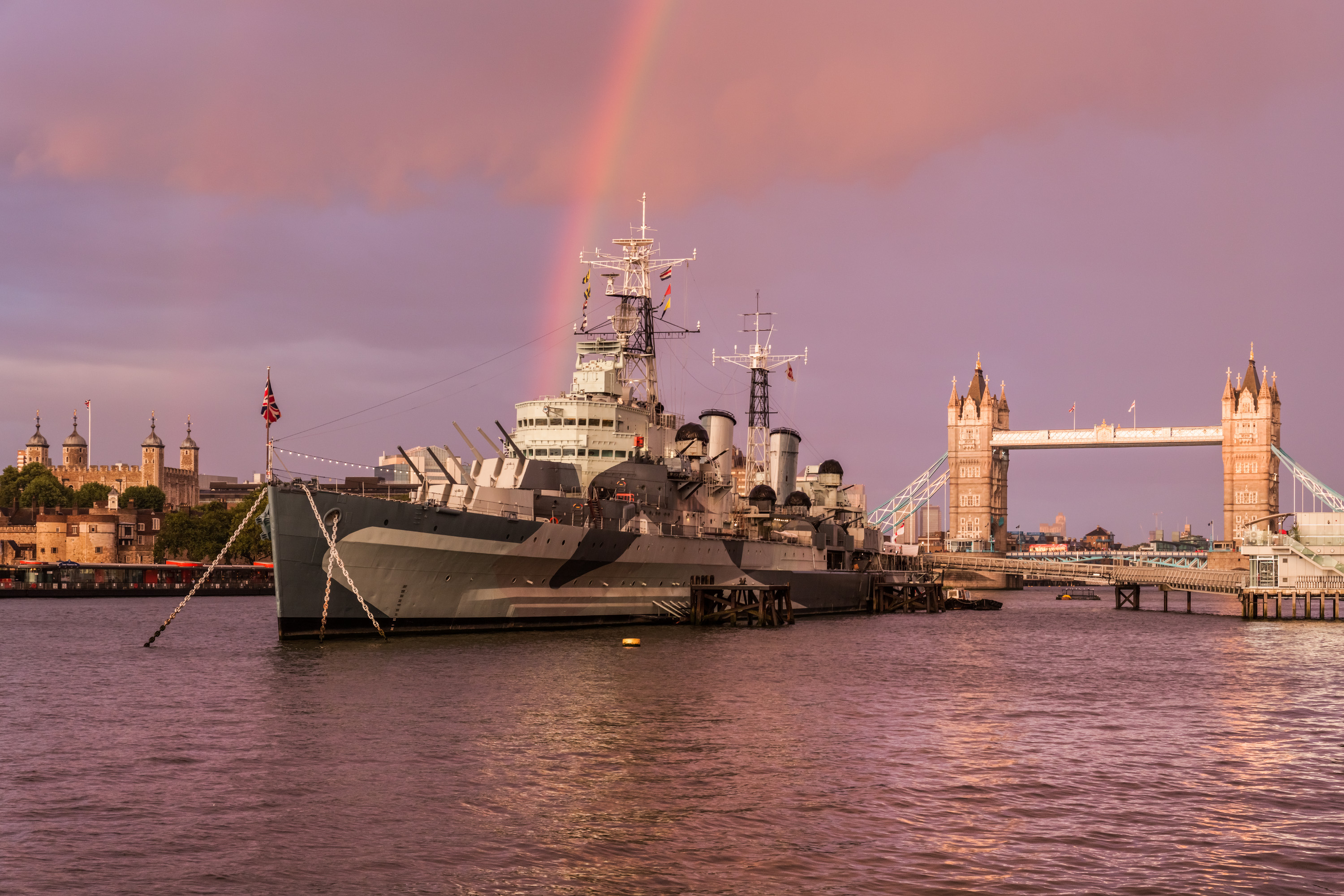
HMS Belfast: WW2 light cruiser, one of only two surviving Royal Navy surface warships from WW2 & one of only two surviving RN Cruisers, preserved in London.

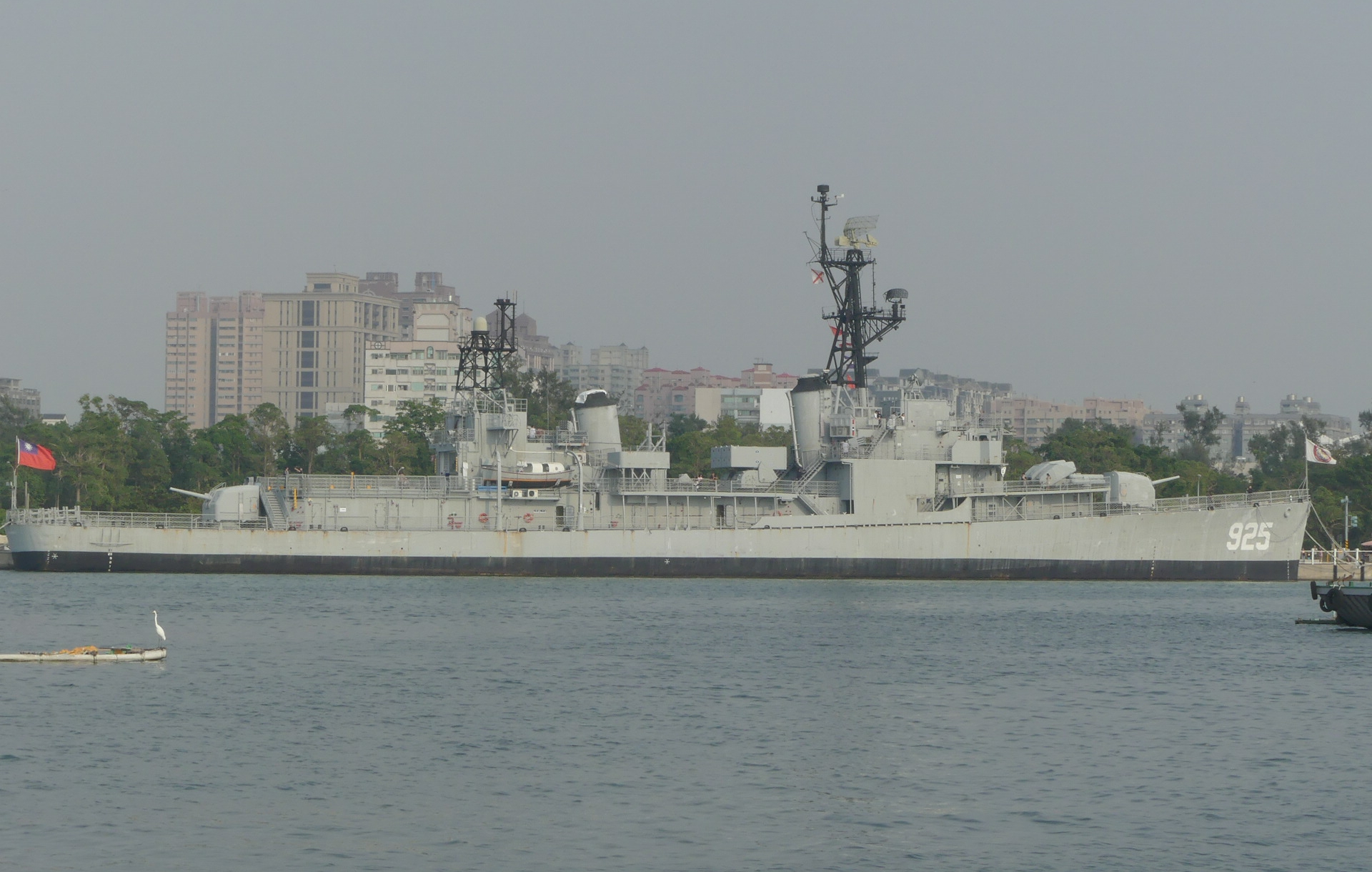
USS Sarsfield: served in the Republic of China Navy as ROCS Te Yang (DDG-925), now preserved in Anping.

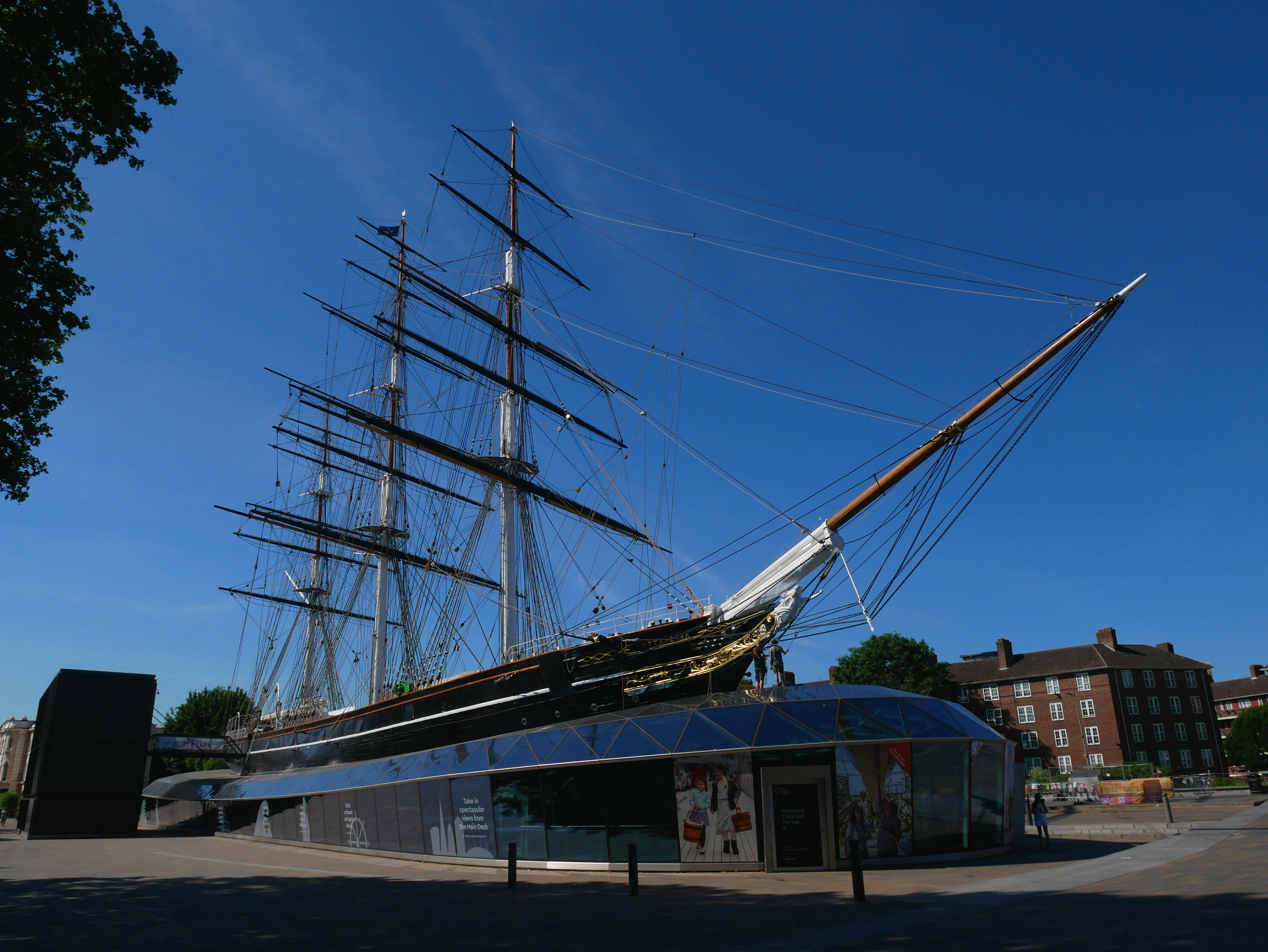
Cutty Sark: 1869 clipper preserved at Greenwich, London.

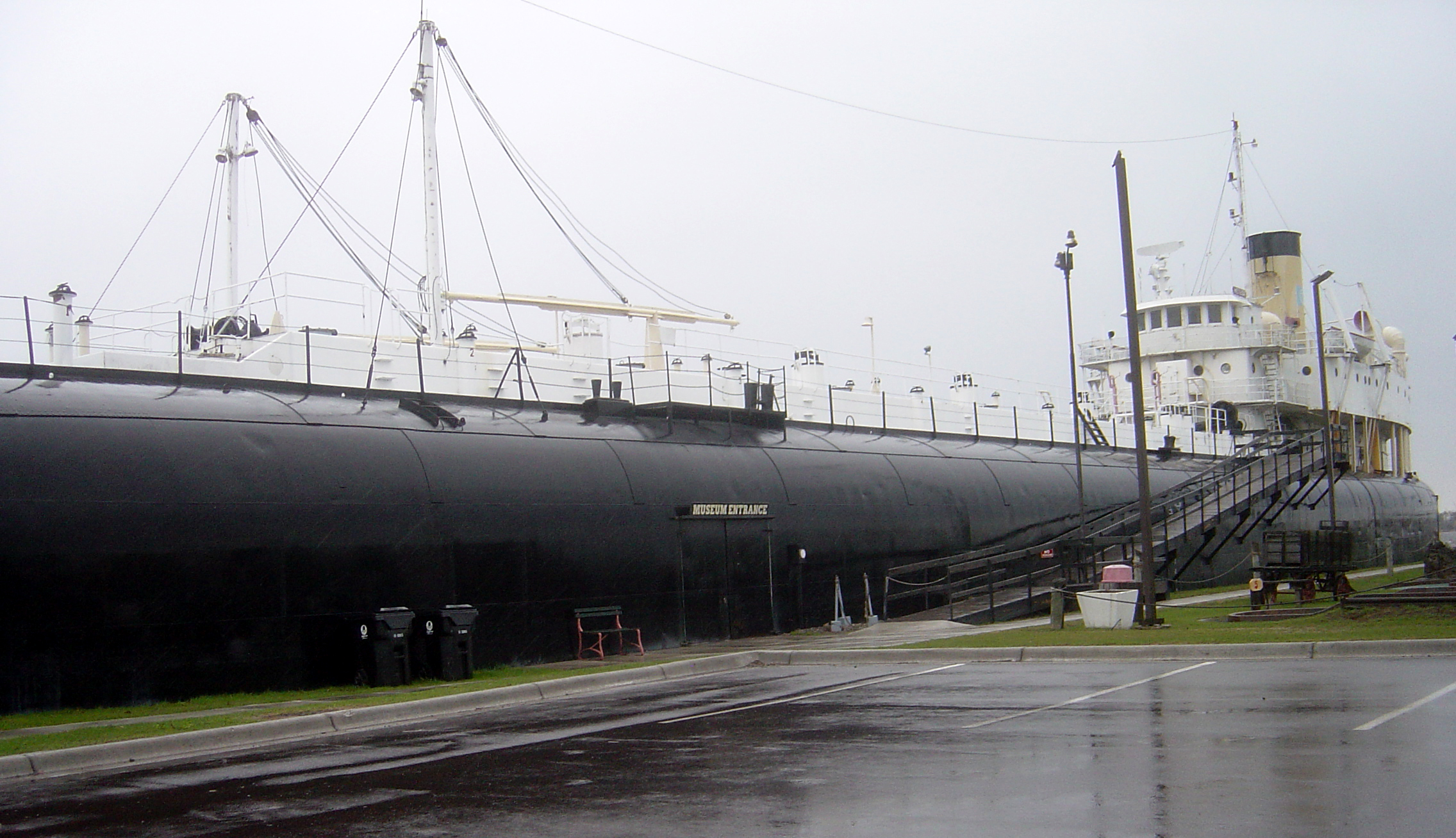
SS Meteor: the only surviving whaleback freighter, on display at Superior, WI.

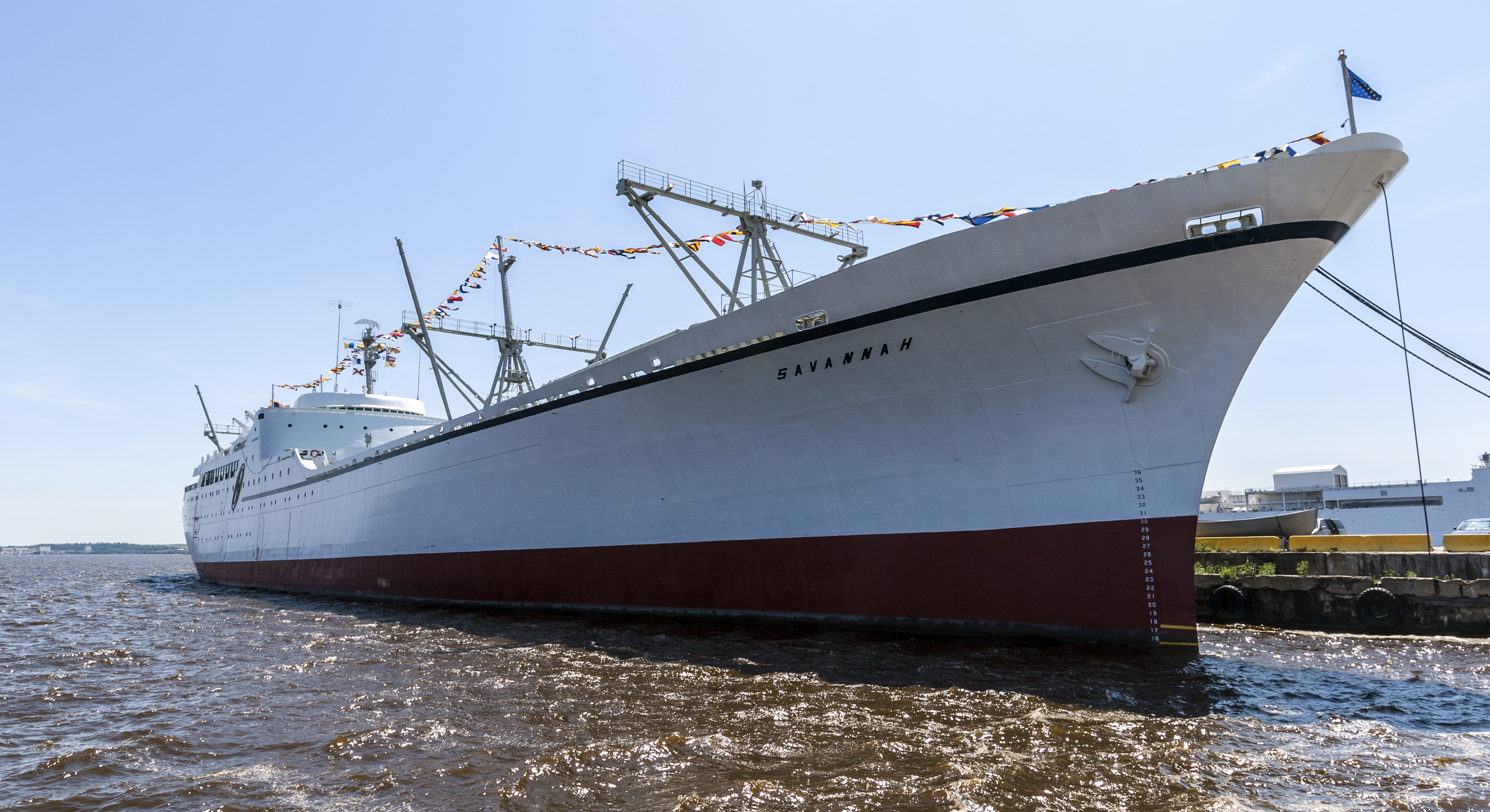
NS Savannah: the world's first nuclear-powered merchant ship, on display in Baltimore.

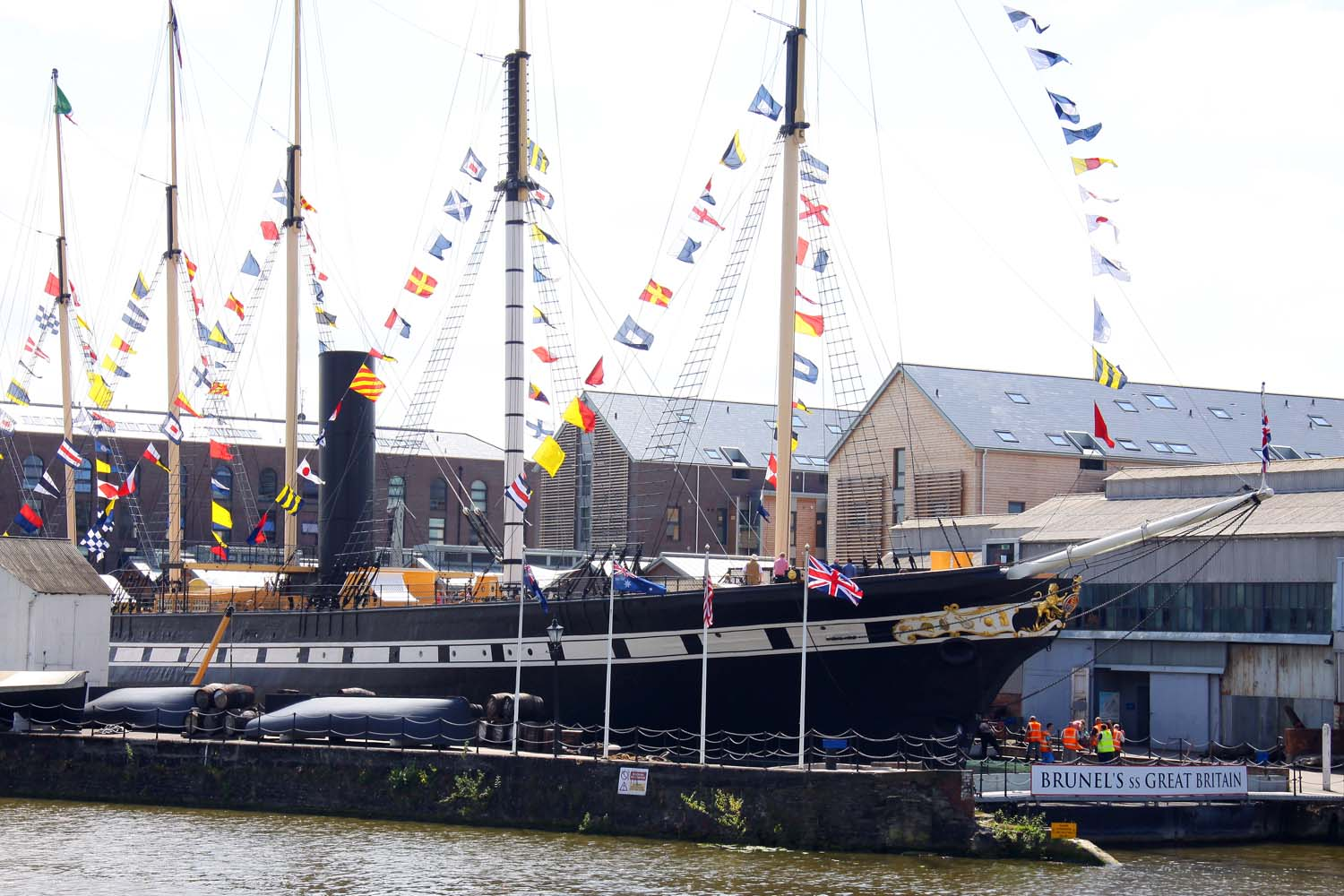
Brunel's 1843 steamship SS Great Britain, widely regarded as the world's first true Ocean Liner, preserved at Bristol.

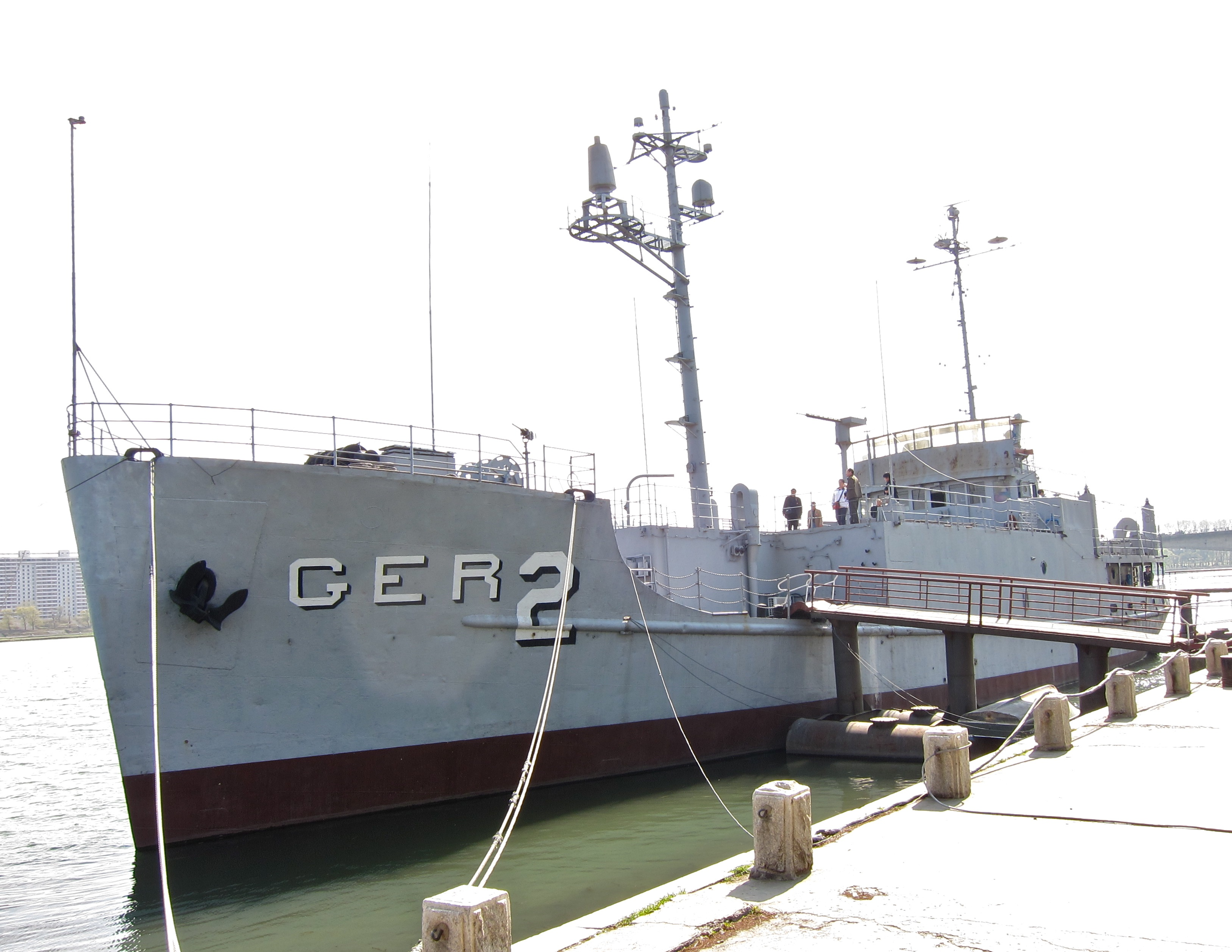
USS Pueblo: captured by North Korea in 1968, preserved as a museum ship in Pyongyang.

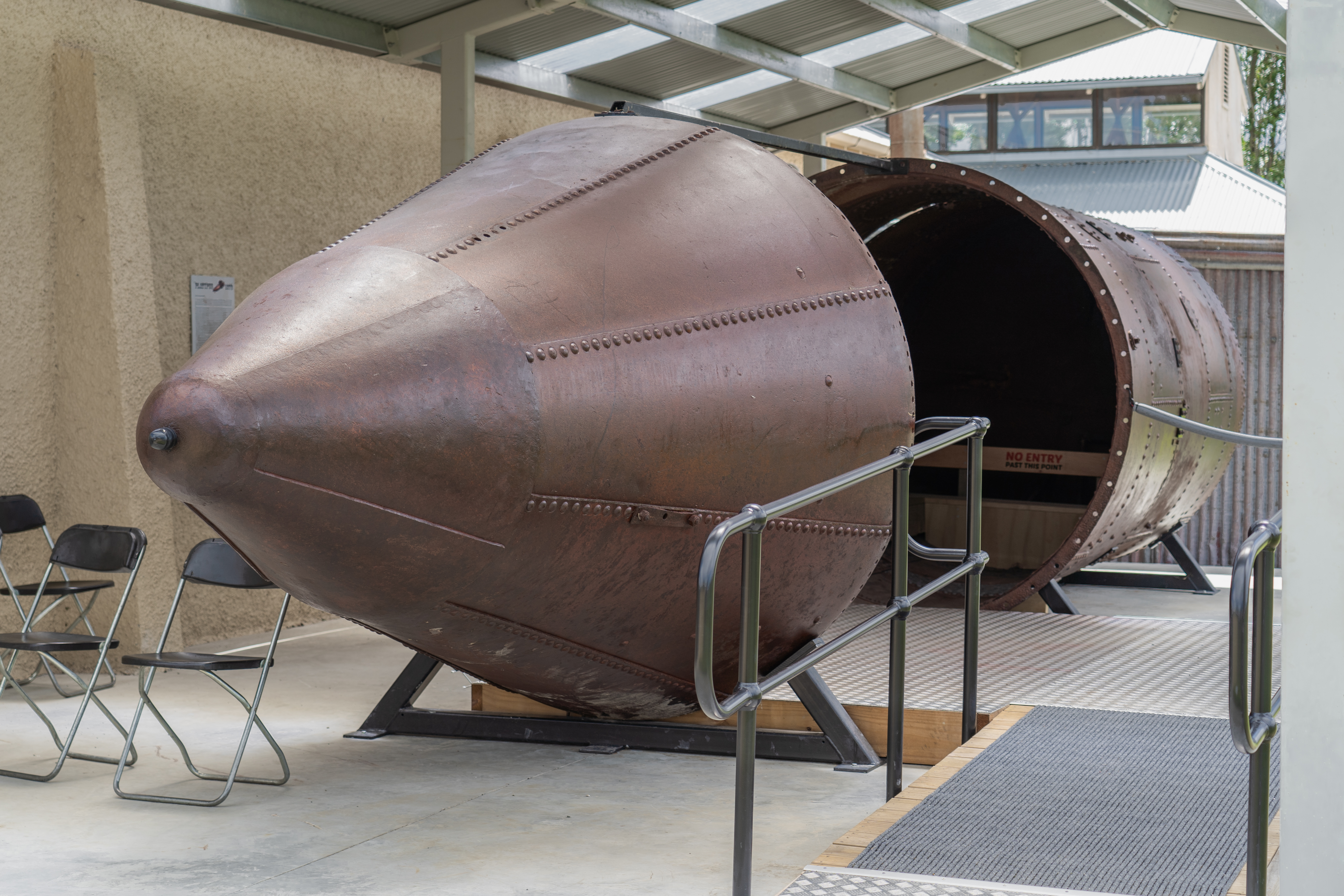
1873 submarine Platypus on display in Middlemarch, New Zealand.

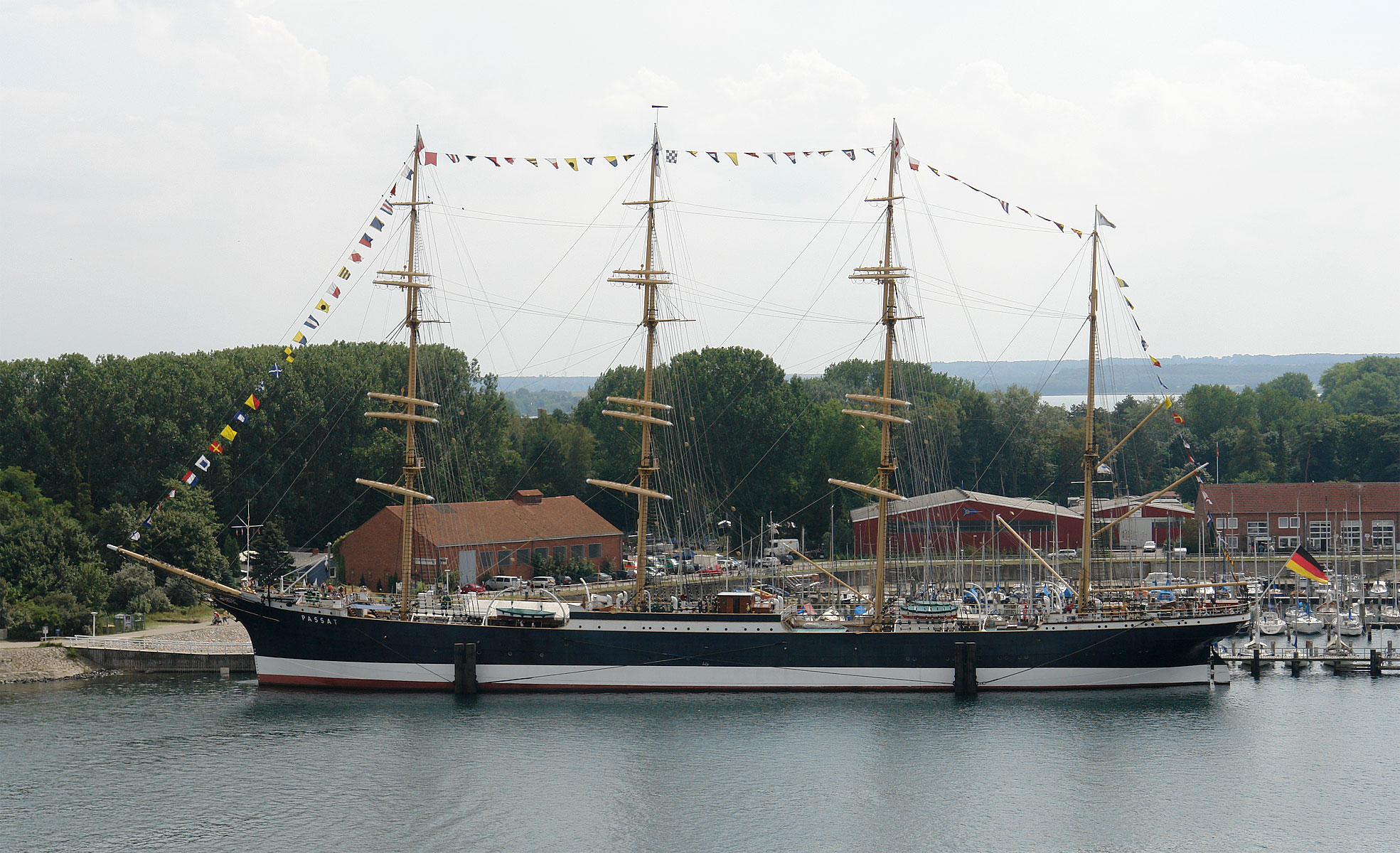
Passat: 1911 German four-masted steel barque, preserved in Travemünde.

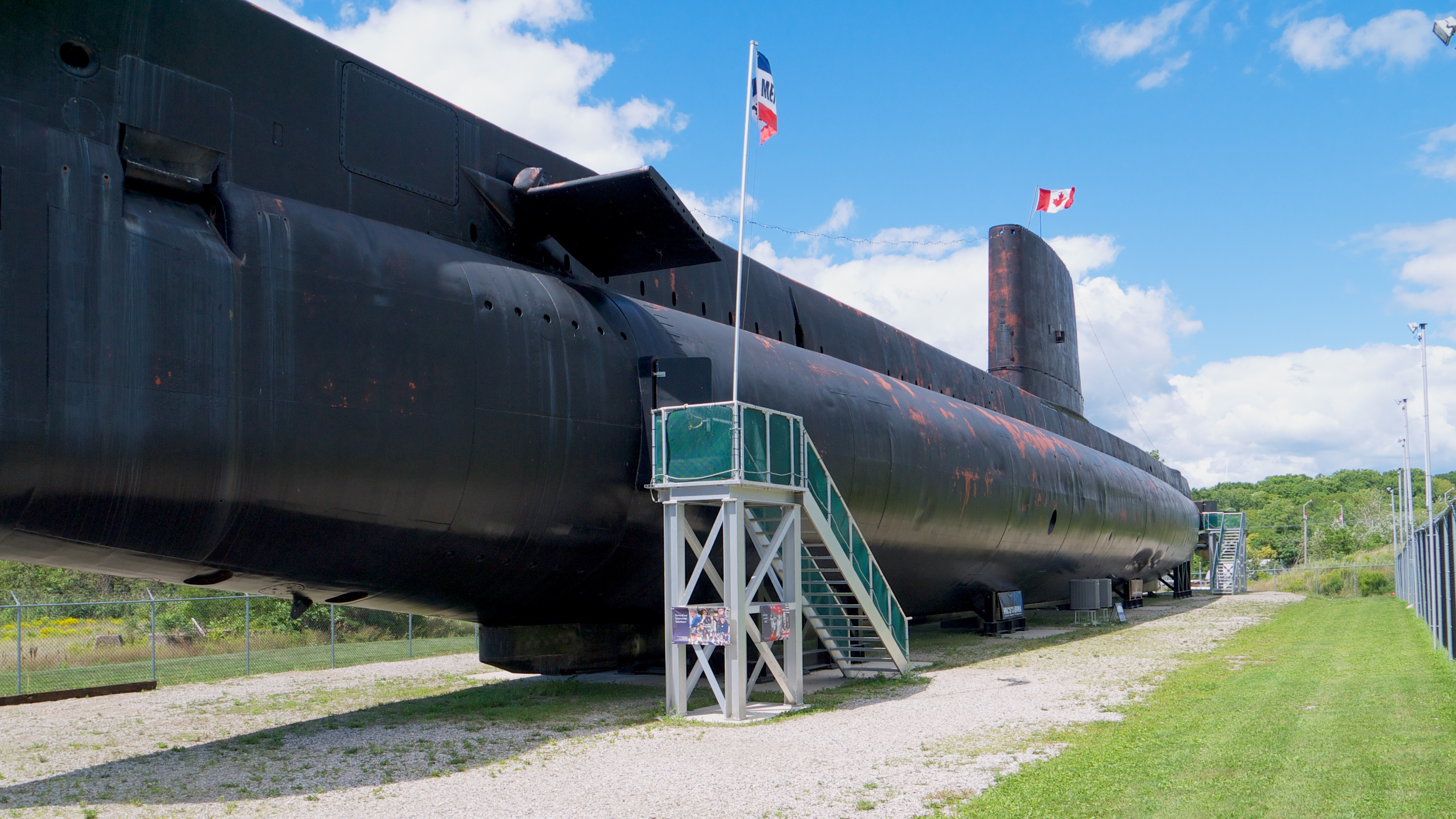
HMCS Ojibwa: an Oberon-class submarine preserved at Port Burwell, Ontario.

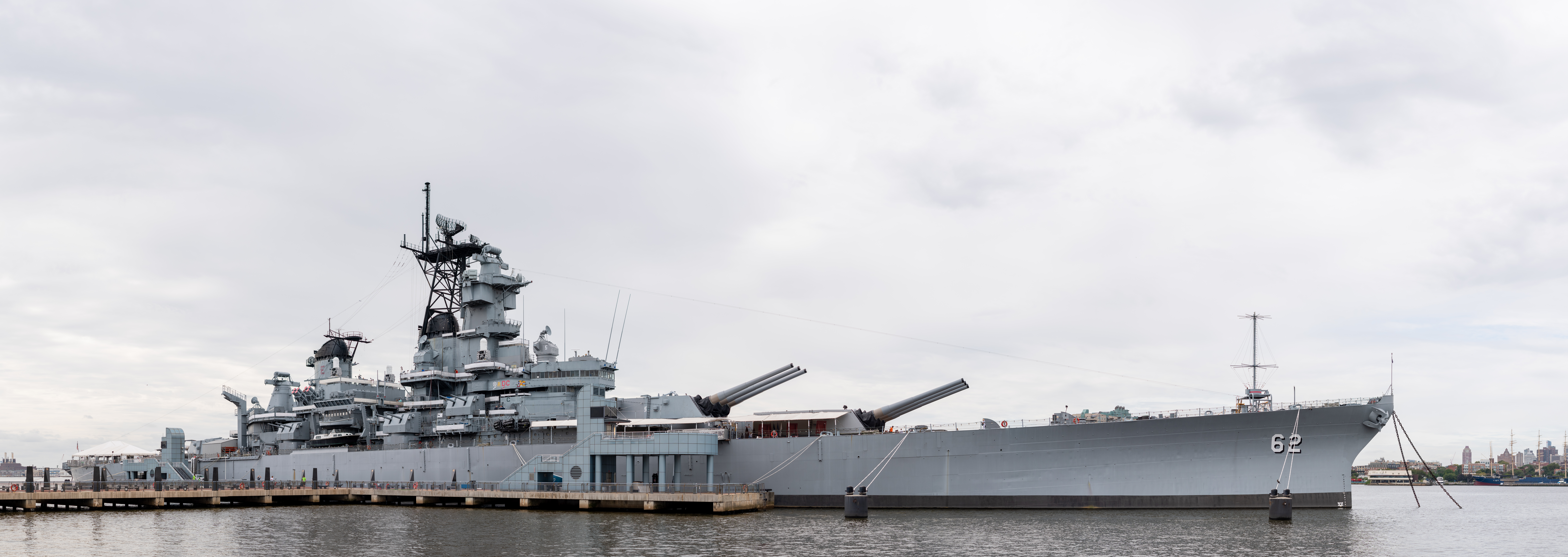
USS New Jersey: an Iowa-class battleship preserved in Camden, New Jersey

== See also ==
- List of museum ships
- List of museum ships in North America
- List of submarine museums
