= Armen Adamjan =

American and Danish YouTuber (born 1989)

Creative Explained
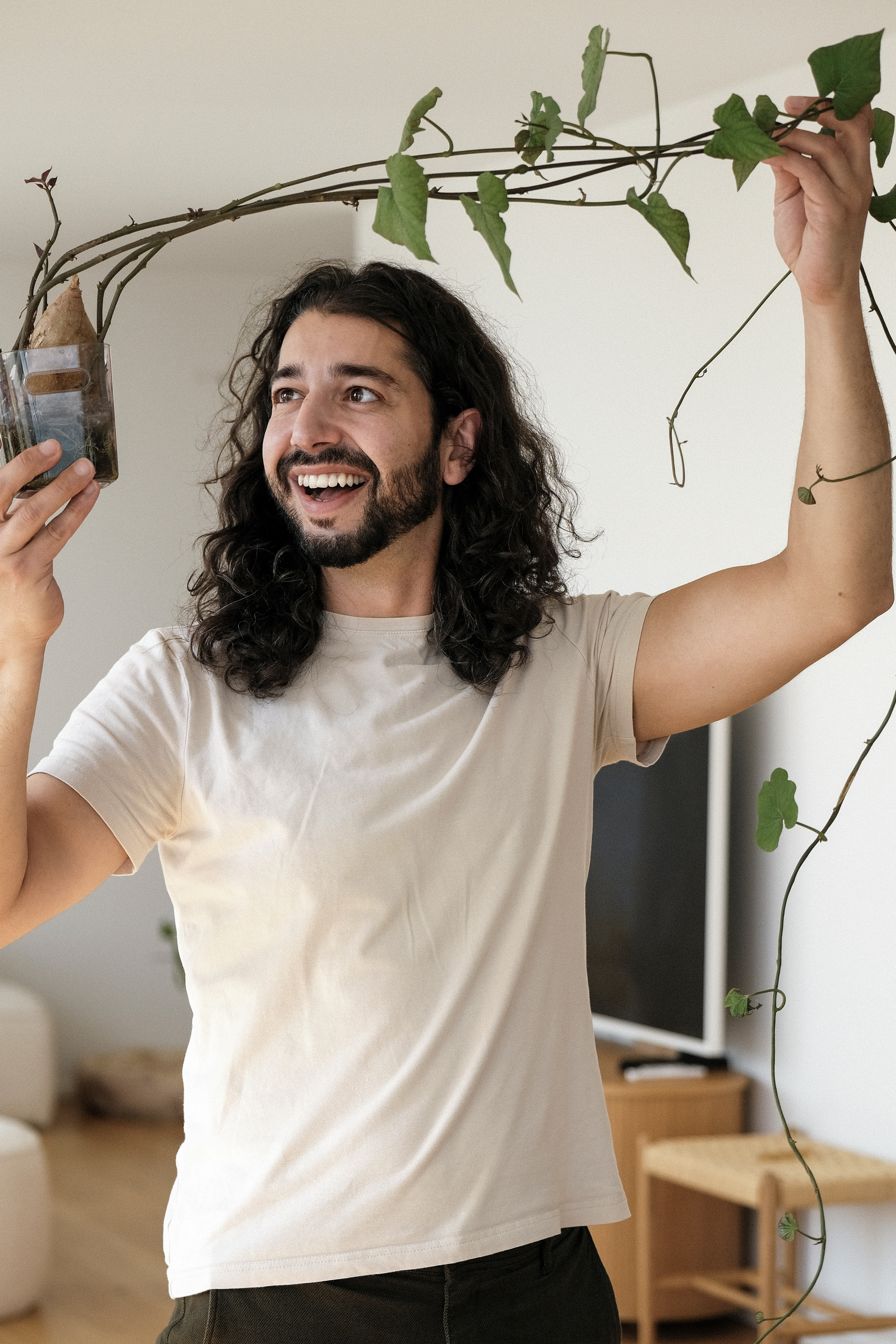
- Armen Adamjan in 2021
- Born: Armen Adamjan; 1989 (age 36–37); Yerevan, Armenia

YouTube information
- Channel: Creative Explained
- Genres: Do it yourself; gardening; life hacks; education; entertainment
- Subscribers: 4.68 million
- Views: 1.46 billion
- Last updated: May 11, 2026
- Website: www.creativeexplained.com

Armen Adamjan (born 1989), also known online as Creative Explained, is an American and Danish YouTuber and TikToker. He is best known for his life hack videos on subjects like plants and cleaning.

== Early life ==
Adamjan was born in Yerevan, Armenia in 1989. He has siblings. When he was three years old, his family fled the country due to the Nagorno-Karabakh conflict, and lived the next ten years in Ebeltoft, Denmark, where he went to school. His interests included martial arts and computer programming. When he was 13, the family moved to Rhode Island, US, where he started high school in 2003. Around 2005 he started to get interested in video and film making.

After high school, he majored in video production and motion graphics, traveled the US and tried to make it as a film maker.

== Social media and other work ==
When the COVID-19 pandemic hit the US in 2020, he got stuck in lockdown with his family in Rhode Island. One day during the lockdown, while chopping scallions, he had the idea to make a short video on how to regrow them and posted it on TikTok. To his astonishment, the next day his video had over 100 000 views. This inspired him to make more videos, generally with a sustainability theme. He says that "The nerd side of me activated and I started researching everything about plants."

Adamjan's videos, published under the handle "Creative Explained", have been noted for his high-energy and enthusiastic style, "enthusiasm bordering on hysteria" according to de Volkskrant. As of early 2025, he has made over a thousand videos, and has a combined twenty-five million followers on TikTok, Instagram and YouTube. His subjects include plants, cleaning, recycling and how to store vegetables. At one point, he discovered that speaking in a louder voice had a positive effect of viewership. One of his suggestions for keeping avocados fresh was criticised by the American Food and Drug Administration (FDA) as being potentially harmful, but many others have been reported to be useful. As of 2024, his most watched YouTube video, on how to grow a cherry seedling, had around 100 million views. He has worked with singer Bryan Adams, actress Jennifer Garner and appeared on The Today Show. As of 2024, he has published two books.

== Personal life ==
As of 2023, he lives in Aarhus, Denmark with his fiancée. They have a daughter, born 2024.

== Recognition ==
He received the Sustainability Influencer of the Year Award in 2022.

== Books ==
- Adamjan, Armen (2020). "Don't Throw it Out": Garden & Plant : Hacks, Tips and Tricks. Armen Adamjan. ISBN 979-8-3789-8116-8.
- Adamjan, Armen (2024). Don't Throw it Out 2!. Armen Adamjan. ISBN 979-8387100062.

== See also ==
- Impact of the COVID-19 pandemic on the arts and cultural heritage
