= Troels Kløvedal =

Danish author, long-distance sailor and lecturer

- Born: Troels Beha Erichsen; 2 April 1943; Copenhagen
- Died: 23 December 2018 (aged 75); Gravlev
- Occupations: Writer, Author
- Children: 5 incl. Mikkel Beha Erichsen
- Relatives: Bjørn Erichsen; Hanne Reintoft; Stine Musse Nielsen; Lise Beha Erichsen
- Writing career
- Period: 1978–2017

Troels Kløvedal (born Troels Beha Erichsen, 2 April 1943 – 23 December 2018) was a Danish author, long-distance sailor and lecturer based in Ebeltoft, Denmark. He and his family are known for their circumnavigation of earth in the steel galleass Nordkaperen, which he and two friends bought in 1967.

== Biography ==
Kløvedal was son of veterinary physician Asbjørn Beha Erichsen (1903–1971) and preschool director Gurli Marie Larsen (1908–1954). Kløvedal was the father of TV host Mikkel Beha Erichsen and film producer and journalist Lærke Kløvedal, and brother of social worker Hanne Reintoft, executive director Lise Beha Erichsen, TV producer Bjørn Erichsen, and sculptor Minea Beha.

In the late 1960s, Kløvedal joined the Svanemølle-collective, which in 1970 was renamed to Maos Lyst. Here he changed his name from Beha Erichsen to Kløvedal, like all other members of the collective, named after the elvish city in Tolkien's The Lord of the Rings.

In 1974 he started his first circumnavigation of earth with Nordkaperen. He circumnavigated the earth three times, and also sailed in waters such as the Aegean Sea, Atlantic Ocean, Pacific Ocean, Polynesia, China Seas and among Indonesian isles.

In the 1970s Kløvedal started to publish his travel experiences in Denmark with photos and text, later followed by travel reports and travel books. In 1977 he married nurse Maiken Junker Kløvedal, with whom he had a daughter. In 1980 they divorced. After that he met Ruth Hagerup Andersen, whom he lived with for 15 years. Together they had two daughters.

In 1978 Kløvedal published his first book, Kærligheden, kildevandet... og det blå ocean, He has since published 17 books, made many movies and held about 2000 talks.

In 2002 Kløvedal married Else Marie Meldgaard, with whom he had a son.

In 2010 he was the narrator and organizer in seven TV programs on national broadcaster DR about the Danish Navy's history, where he, among others, interviewed Queen Margrethe II.

In 2013 the TV program Mit Danmark shown on TV 2 Fri, where Troels Kløvedal travels with Nordkaperen in Denmark and tells about the history, geography, nature, culture and religion of Denmark.

In 2015 Kløvedal sailed with the Nordkaperen to Greece and followed Odysseus's journey. This resulted in the TV 2 program Nordkaperen i Grækenland.

In October 2016 Kløvedal announced that he had been diagnosed with the lung disease bronchiectasis and the rare and aggressive disease ALS, which slowly paralyses the body.

Kløvedal was made Knight of the Order of the Dannebrog in 2016.

In the book 'Alle mine morgener på jorden' fra 2017 Kløvedal told that he, with the help of lawyer Knud Foldschack, had ensured that Nordkaperen could continue to sail after his death. He wrote: "I have bequeathed the ship to my 5 children and 10 young navigators, who all have borrowed Nordkaperen in longer periods, and can board directly and sail in it."

On 1 November 2018 the Danish Natural History Museum in Aarhus opened an exhibition about Troels Kløvedal, which exhibits photos, videos, and cultural and natural historic objects, that he collected on his journeys. In October 2019 the exhibition reopens on M/S Museet for Søfart in Helsingør.

Troels Kløvedal died on 23 December 2018 due to the incurable lung disease bronchiectasia and ALS.

== Bibliography ==
- Kærligheden, kildevandet... og det blå ocean, 1978
- Fra Tahiti til Thyborøn med Nordkaperen, 1980
- Fra mit hjerte, min køjesæk og min græske logbog, 1982
- Med Nordøstpassaten over Atlanten (children's book), 1982
- Sydhavssejlads (children's book), 1982
- Mod indonesiske vulkaner, (children's book) 1983
- Bidevind og blåhvaler, 1984
- Med monsunen hjemover (children's book), 1984
- Grækenland igen, efterårssejlads gennem et slør af vinløvsranker – de ioniske øer i aftenlys (short story), 1984
- Højsommer, 1986
- At synge, at danse og at bede sammen (short story), 1987
- Hvad sang sirenerne, 1989
- Øerne under vinden, 1992
- Til søs med Gurli Marie : en eventyrlig rejse til Polynesien (children's book), 1992
- Den tynde hud : erindringer om en barndom og opvækst, 1994
- Afrodites smil : en rejse fra det Indiske Ocean til Ægæerhavet, 1996
- At være et frit menneske (essays), 1997
- Åbn din dør for din nabo (essays), 2002
- - og den halve verden, 2002
- Kineserne syr med lang tråd: på togt med Nordkaperen op ad Yangtze, 2004
- Med Asbjørn på de store oceaner, 2005
- Fortællinger fra den danske flådes historie gennem 500 år, 2010
- Alle mine morgener på jorden: Mit autodidakte liv, 2017

== Movies ==
- Troels Kløvedal og Nordkaperen i det Indiske Ocean - Op langs Malabarkysten
- Troels Kløvedal og Nordkaperen i det Indiske Ocean - Med nord-øst monsunen til Oman
- Troels Kløvedal og Nordkaperen i det Indiske Ocean - På togt i det Røde Hav
- Troels Kløvedal og Nordkaperen i det Indiske Ocean - På togt i Andamanerhavet
- Rejsen til verdens navle

Kløvedal appeared in the movie Cirkus Ildebrand i 1995.
