= Ebeltoft =

Ebeltoft Ebeltoft
- Port town
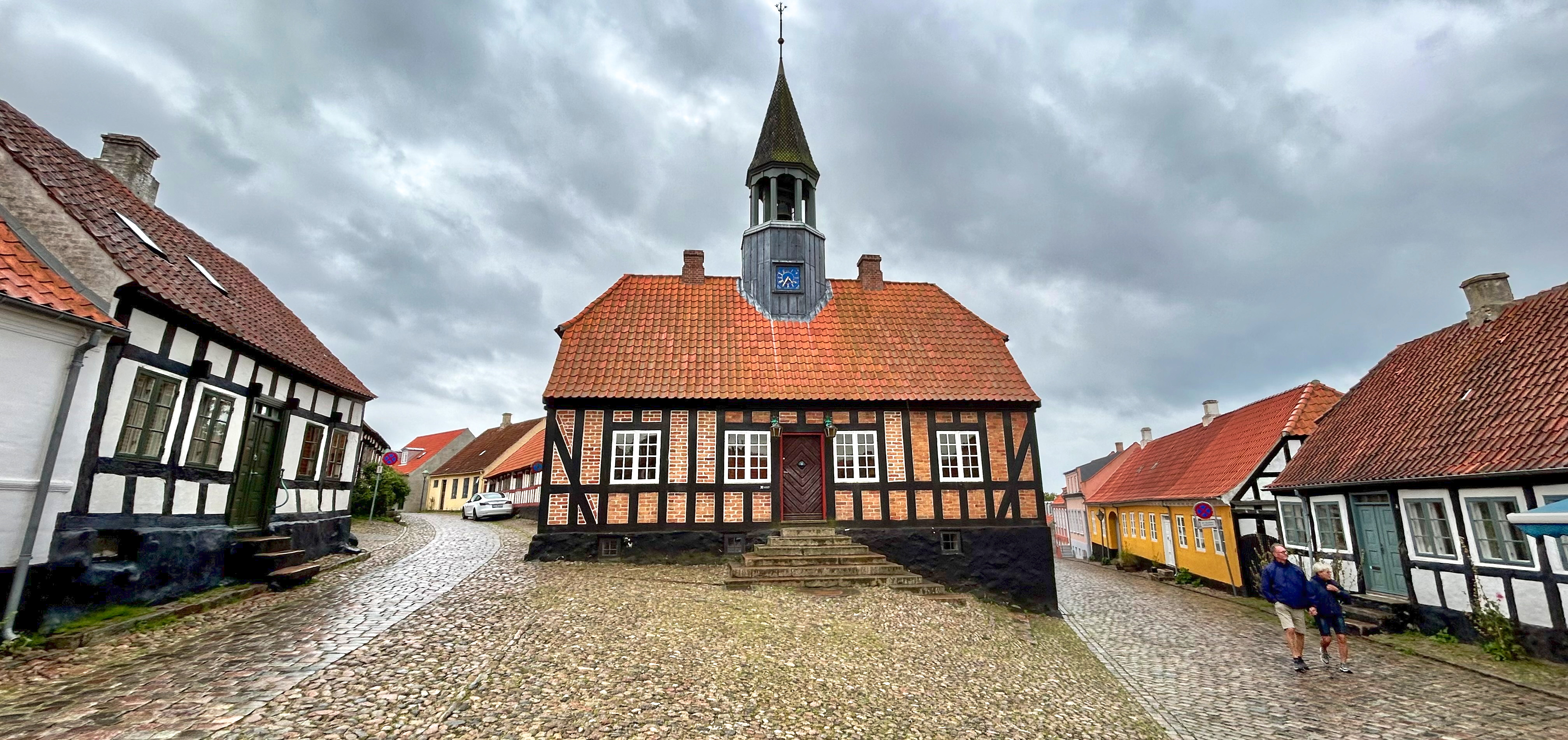
- The former town hall of Ebeltoft

- Coat of arms

- Location in Denmark Ebeltoft (Central Denmark Region)
- Coordinates: 56°11′37″N 10°40′41″E
- Country: Denmark
- Region: Central Denmark (Midtjylland)
- Municipality: Syddjurs

Area
  - Urban: 7.3 km^{2} (2.8 sq mi)

Population (2026)
  - Urban: 7,437
  - Urban density: 1,000/km^{2} (2,600/sq mi)
  - Gender: 3,550 males and 3,887 females
- Demonym: Ebeltofter
- Time zone: UTC+1 (CET)
  - Summer (DST): UTC+2 (CEST)
- Postal code: DK-8400 Ebeltoft
- Website: www.ebeltoftby.dk

Ebeltoft is an old port town on the central east coast of Denmark with a population of 7,437 (1 January 2026). It is located in Syddjurs municipality in Region Midtjylland on the larger Djursland peninsula of Jutland.

Ebeltoft is known for its old town center with cobble-stoned streets and centuries-old half-timbered houses. Plans for the conservation of this peculiar environment, was initiated in the 1960s by the city council and the National Museum of Denmark. Apart from this overall old-village charm, Ebeltoft holds several other notable institutions such as Glasmuseet Ebeltoft, one of the world's first glass museums, Fregatten Jylland, the longest wooden warship in the world and the European Film College, offering short and long courses in film making, especially for young people.

== Tourism ==
Ebeltoft and the surrounding countryside is one of the tourist centres of Denmark, with many summer houses and rentals, a marina, a golf course and many child-friendly beaches. In spite of its relatively small size, Ebeltoft is quite lively, especially in the summer season. The population soars in June, July, and August - but all year round, there are many more people staying here than the official number of inhabitants suggests. This is due to the Danish phenomenon of 'summer houses' (holiday homes): most are made of wood but often quite luxurious, and there are several thousand in this area. The tourism, the old traditions of trade in this harbour town, and the international schools in the area probably explain why most people in this small town are open-minded and friendly towards foreigners. The town is, generally speaking, also well-to-do. Quite a few people work in the city of Aarhus, which is only 50 km away by road and so within commuting distance. The Aarhus Airport is just 15 km by road to the north.

Ebeltoft itself offers fewer and fewer opportunities for employment. Several large companies that used to employ unskilled labour are now closed; traditional trades, such as fishing and farming are diminishing rapidly; and the ferry line, Mols-linien, has moved quite a few of its employees to the ferry port of Aarhus. However, the town is popular with artisans, such as glass workers, potters, painters, and jewellery designers. The Glasmuseet Ebeltoft, which shows contemporary glass art from all over the world, was established in 1985 by Ebeltoft glass artists Finn Lynggaard and his wife, Tchai Munch. The many general stores and supermarkets - as well as hotels, restaurants, and bars - offer opportunities to make a living.

== Surroundings ==
Around Ebeltoft lie few small towns such as Fuglsø and Knebel on the Mols Peninsula. Just south of the town is the holiday resort of Øer. In 2009 the large Mols Bjerge National Park was inaugurated and it includes the town of Ebeltoft.

== Gallery ==
Street view from the old town center of Ebeltoft.

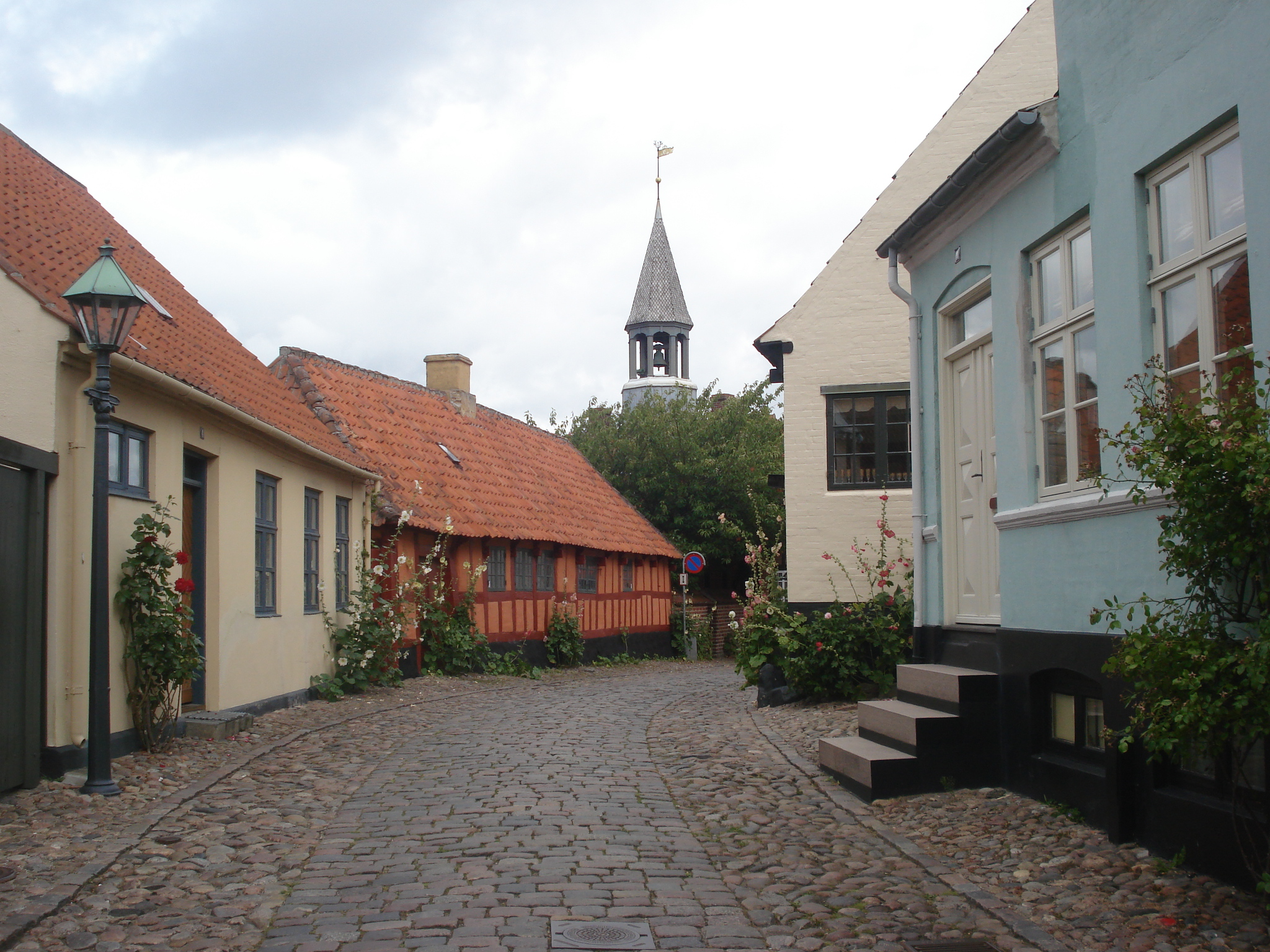
Cobblestone streets and old half-timbered houses.

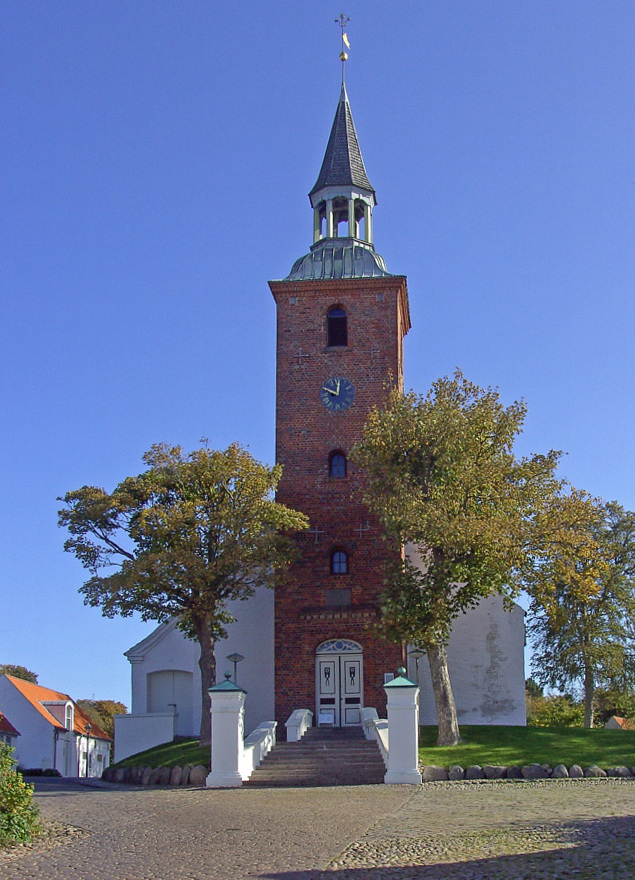
Ebeltoft Church

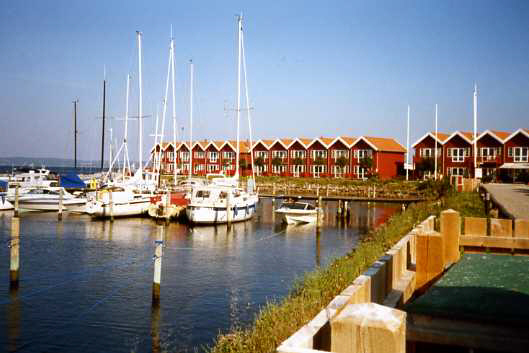
Ebeltoft marina

== Some regional attractions ==
- Djurs Sommerland - outdoor amusement park
- Randers Tropical Zoo
- Kattegatcentret – aquarium, fish, (large) sharks, seals
- Fjord- og Kystcentret / Visit Center at Randers Fjord – exhibitions, guided tours, etc.
- Dansk Motor- og Maskinsamling – The Engine Collection, Scandinavia’s largest stationary engine collection
- Landbrugsmuseet, Gl. Estrup/ The Agriculture Museum at Gl. Estrup - agricultural museum including extensive gardens with traditional vegetables and crops
- Herregårdsmuseet Gl. Estrup/ The Manor Museum, Gl. Estrup
- Munkholm Zoo – zoo aimed at families with small children
- Ree Park – exotic zoo in a hilly countryside
- Skandinavisk Dyrepark/ Scandinavian animal park – zoo, Scandinavian animals
- Glasmuseet – contemporary glass museum.
- Fregatten Jylland – Frigate Jutland – one of world's largest wooden warships
- Kalø Castle – a 700-year-old ruined castle on a peninsula
- Kalø Veteranbiltræf / Kaloe Veteran Car Meet, Tuesdays

== Notable people ==
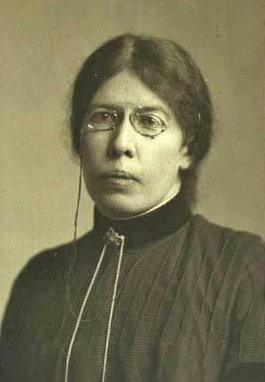
Anna Sophie von der Hude, 1904

- Knud Nielsen Benstrup (born 1692 in Ebeltoft) a Danish naval officer and shipbuilder at the Royal Danish naval shipyards; court martialled and imprisoned
- Otto Mønsted (1838 in Lyngsbækgård on Mols near Ebeltoft - 1916) an industrialist and margarine manufacturer
- Poul la Cour (1846 in Ebeltoft – 1908) a scientist and inventor; did early work on wind power
- Hack Kampmann (1856 in Ebeltoft -1920), architect; best known work is Marselisborg Palace
- Anna Hude (1858 in Ebeltoft – 1934) the first Danish woman to graduate as a historian (1887) and to become a Doctor of Philosophy
- Olga Knudsen (1865 in Følle near Ebeltoft –1947) a politician and women's rights activist
- Prince Viggo, Count of Rosenborg (1893 – 1970 in Ebeltoft) a Danish prince
- Troels Kløvedal (1943–2018) an author, long-distance sailor and lecturer based in Ebeltoft
- Anders Eldrup (born 1948 in Ebeltoft) a businessman and politician, CEO of DONG Energy
- Sally Laird (1956–2010), British writer, editor and translator, moved to Ebeltoft in 1993
- Armen Adamjan (born 1989 or 1990), lived in Ebeltoft between ages 3-13

=== Sport ===
- Troels Rasmussen (born 1961 in Ebeltoft) a former football goalkeeper with 346 club caps and 35 for Denmark
- Peter Degn (born 1977 in Ebeltoft) a former footballer with 222 clubs caps, now owns a pub in Ebeltoft
