= Ree Park – Ebeltoft Safari =

Ree Park Safari

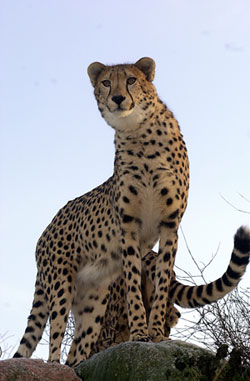
- Cheetah at the park
- Interactive map of Ree Park Safari
- 56°15′49″N 10°44′12″E
- Location: Ebeltoft, Djursland, Denmark
- Land area: 70 hectares (170 acres)
- No. of species: About 80
- Memberships: DAZA and EAZA
- Website: reepark.dk

Ree Park Safari is a safari park in Ebeltoft, Djursland on the Jutland peninsula, Denmark. The safari park is the home of more than 800 animals of 80 species from 5 continents. This popular tourist attraction offers its guests a comprehensive insight into the life and behaviour of animals from Europe, Africa, North America, South America and Asia.

== History ==
The zoo was founded in 1991 by Frans Kilde Hansen and was named Ebeltoft Dyrepark. Ebeltoft Dyrepark was sold in 1993 to Lars Thye and the name was changed to Ebeltoft Zoo. Merete and Henrik Elsass bought the zoo 1998 and changed the name to Ebeltoft Zoo & Safari. In 2006 the zoo was bought by Karsten Ree, and the zoo got its present name.

In 2007 Ree Park became member of DAZA and EAZA.

== Description ==
Welfare of wild animals in captivity is a key value in the vision of the park. This is why all the different species of the park live in surroundings tailored to meet their special needs and instinctive behaviour. The American black bears, for example, have access to both tall trees and lakes in order to facilitate their natural climbing and swimming behaviour. Similarly, the cheetahs live in a hilly bush savannah where these fast predators can spot e.g. antelopes in a different area of the park. This architectural feature of the park evokes instinctive hunting behaviour in the cheetahs even though the animals do not have access to their prey. In their natural African habitat, cheetahs often observe the savannah from hills and rocks enabling them to find their prey from a long distance.

== Focus on endangered species ==
Apart from offering its guests exciting wildlife experiences during the opening season, a major priority of Ree Park – Ebeltoft Safari is an extensive focus on endangered species. And as a member of EAZA (European Association os Zoos and Aquaria), the park has made important achievements within the EEP (European Endangered Species Programme). In 2007, 9 cheetahs were born in the park. This important contribution to species conservation made Ree Park – Ebeltoft Safari one of the largest centres for cheetahs in Northern Europe. Other examples of successful EEP work include the reintroduction of the endangered European bison into the wild, the breeding of the very rare sand cat, and promising work with the endangered African wild dog, one of the world's most endangered carnivores.
