= Gammel Estrup Manor =

Red-brick Renaissance manor house in Jutland, Denmark

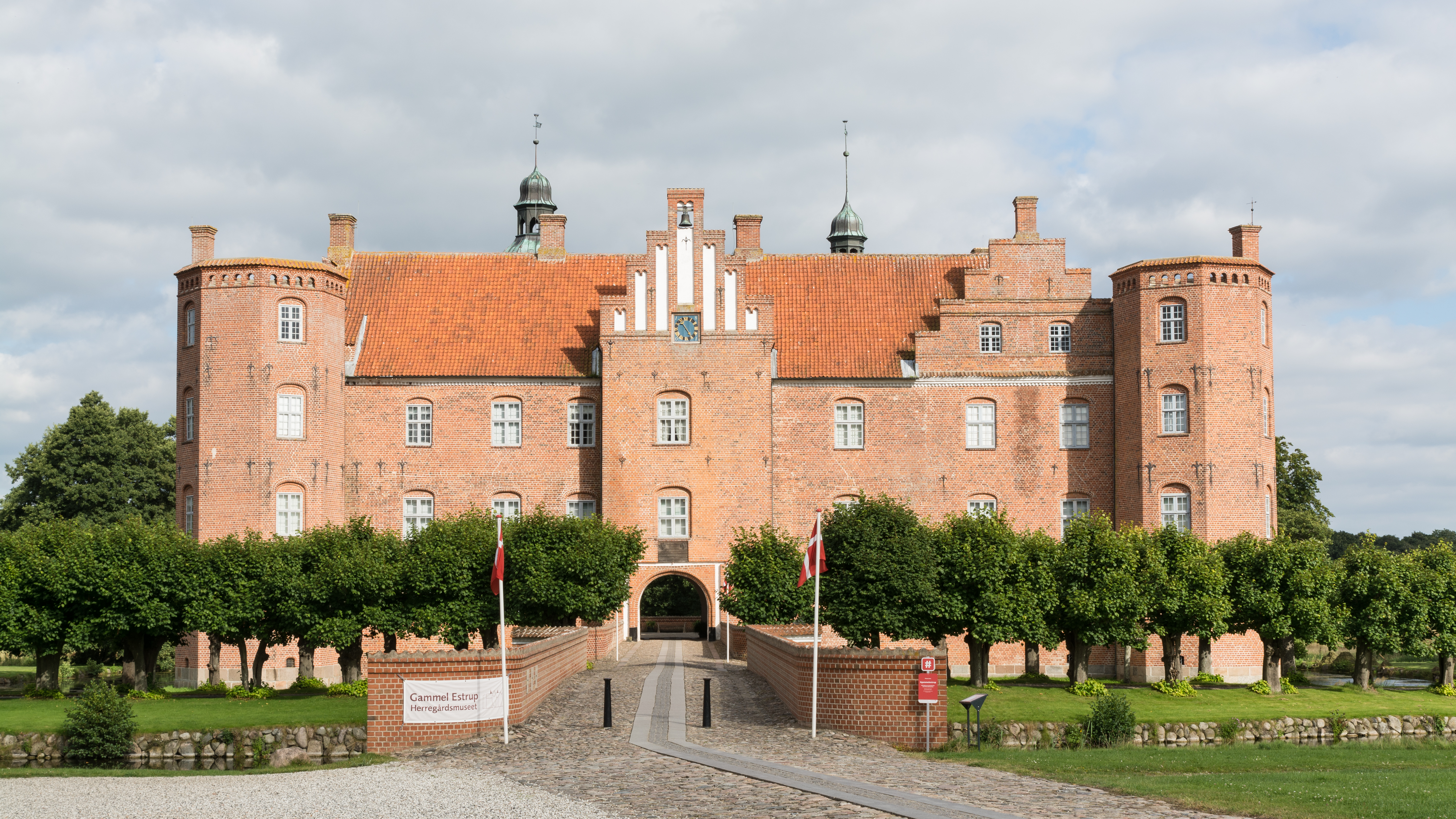
- Interactive map of the Gammel Estrup Manor area

General information
- Architectural style: Renaissance/Gothic
- Location: Randers, Denmark
- Coordinates: 56°26′17.45″N 10°20′38.37″E
- Construction started: 1490
- Client: Eske Brock

Design and construction
- Architect: Mathias Bygmester
- Engineer: Mathias Bygmester

Gammel Estrup Manor (Danish: Gammel Estrup) is a red-brick Renaissance manor house some 20 km (12 mi) east of Randers in Jutland, Denmark. The manor as we know it today can be traced back to 1490. But excavations have revealed evidence of earlier constructions also mentioned in texts under the name Essendrup dating back to 1340.

== History ==
The construction of Gammel Estrup was started around 1490 by nobleman Lave Eskesen Brock (died 1503) who built a moated fortress on the site. But it was his great-grandson, Eske Brock (1560-1625) who rebuilt and modernized the manor. Eske Brock was a nobleman and close friend of King Christian IV to whom he also served as a minister. Through Brock's detailed diaries we know a great deal about how a rich nobleman lived at that time. The Brock family, who owned the manor until 1625, also had a number of other estates in the area. The building then passed into the hands of the equally rich Skeel family who maintained ownership until 1926.

== Museum ==
Since 1930 the manor has been a museum, showing the development of Danish nobility through the ages. The rooms are furnished as they might have been in past centuries. There is also an exhibition depicting the conditions under which the servants and household staff used to live.

The surrounding buildings support the museum, the nearby apple plantation and a horticulture research center.

The museum is open from 10 a.m. to 5 p.m. every day from mid-April to mid-October and on most days the rest of the year except January when it is closed.
