= HDMS Jylland =

Danish steam frigate

Coordinates: 56°11′57″N 10°40′26″E

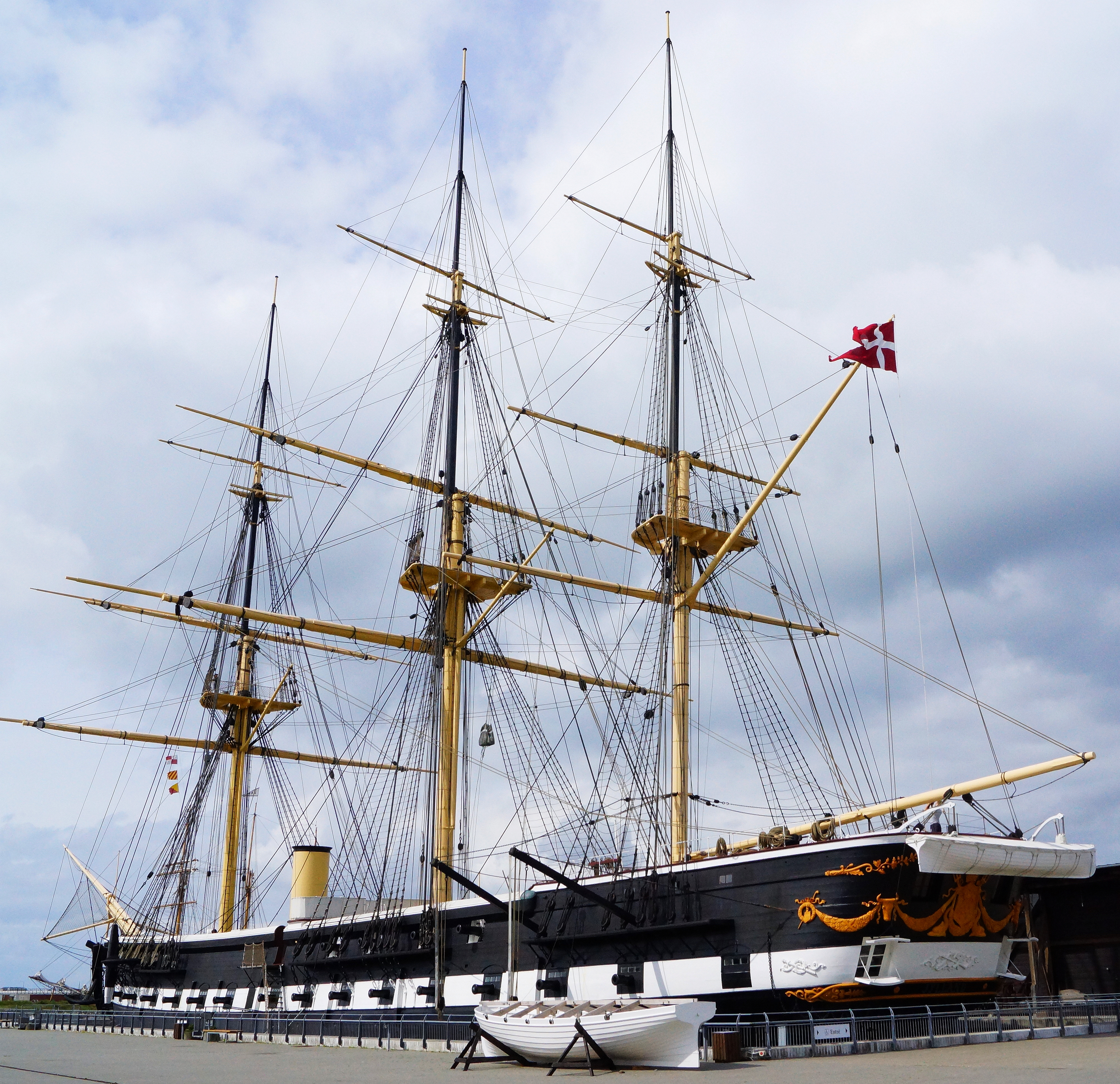
- Jylland in the museum dedicated to it, Ebeltoft, Denmark 2005.

History

Denmark
- Name: Jylland
- Builder: Naval War Yard, Copenhagen
- Laid down: June 11, 1857
- Launched: November 20, 1860
- Commissioned: May 15, 1862
- Decommissioned: 1908
- Status: Museum ship in Ebeltoft, Denmark
- Notes: Designed by Dock Master O. F. Suenson

General characteristics
- Class & type: Niels Juel-class sail- and screw propelled steam frigate
- Displacement: 2456 tons
- Length: 102 m (335 ft)
- Beam: 13.5 m (44 ft)
- Draft: 6 m (20 ft)
- Propulsion: 1300 indicated hp (400 kW nominal) Baumgarten & Burmeister steam engine; 1-shaft with a folding helix
- Sail plan: square-rigged ship
- Speed: 11 kn (20 km/h) on steam; 12 kn (22 km/h) on sail
- Complement: 405–437
- Armament: As built: 30 × 30-pounder 50 cwt. guns (Note: The Danish equivalent of a long hundredweight (112 imperial pounds, 50.8 kg) or quintal is the da:Centnter of 100 Danish pounds (da:Pund (masseenhed), 496 g)); 14 × 30-pounder 40 cwt. guns; In 1864: 32 × 30-pounder guns; 8 × 18-pounder rifled guns; 4 × 12-pounder rifled guns; Later: 20 × 6-inch (Note: The old Danish inch (da:Tomme) measures 2.61545 cm, whereas the imperial inch measures 2.54 cm exactly.) 50 cwt. muzzle loading guns; 6 × 5-inch 28 cwt. breech loading guns; 6 × revolving cannon; 1 × 37 mm breech loading gun; 1 × Mitrailleuse

Jylland is a Danish frigate, and is both a screw-propelled steam frigate and a sailship. It took part in the Battle of Heligoland on 9 May 1864, and is preserved as a museum ship in the small town of Ebeltoft, located on the Djursland peninsula in Denmark.

== Design ==
She was built for the Royal Danish Navy in 1860 as a sailing frigate with an auxiliary screw-drive steam engine and a wooden hull. The figurehead was carved by the sculptor Julius Magnus Petersen and represents the region of Jutland in the form of the shepherd's rod and the fishing net.

== History ==
During the Second Schleswig War, she participated in the naval action against the Austro-Prussian fleet in the Battle of Heligoland on 9 May 1864. Jylland, along with Niels Juel and Heimdall, engaged two Austrian frigates and three small Prussian gunboats, but was unable to maintain the blockade of the Prussian North Sea ports. Jylland sustained considerable damage during the battle.

By 1874, she was in use as a training ship for naval cadets. In the 1890s she was reduced to stationary use and barely escaped scrapping in 1908. She served as a barracks and training ship between 1892 and 1908. It was, however, decided to preserve her and she was towed to Ebeltoft in 1960. The hulked frigate further deteriorated until she was placed in dry dock in 1984. Restoration proved to be a major task; over 60% of the timber had to be replaced in addition to the rigging, armament, engines and loose gear.

In Danish, she is known as simply Fregatten Jylland, although several ships have used this name. The restoration efforts were completed in 1994 and she is on permanent display in dry dock at the town of Ebeltoft, Denmark. A commemorative coin was issued by the National Bank of Denmark. Jylland is the last surviving screw frigate.

== Gallery ==
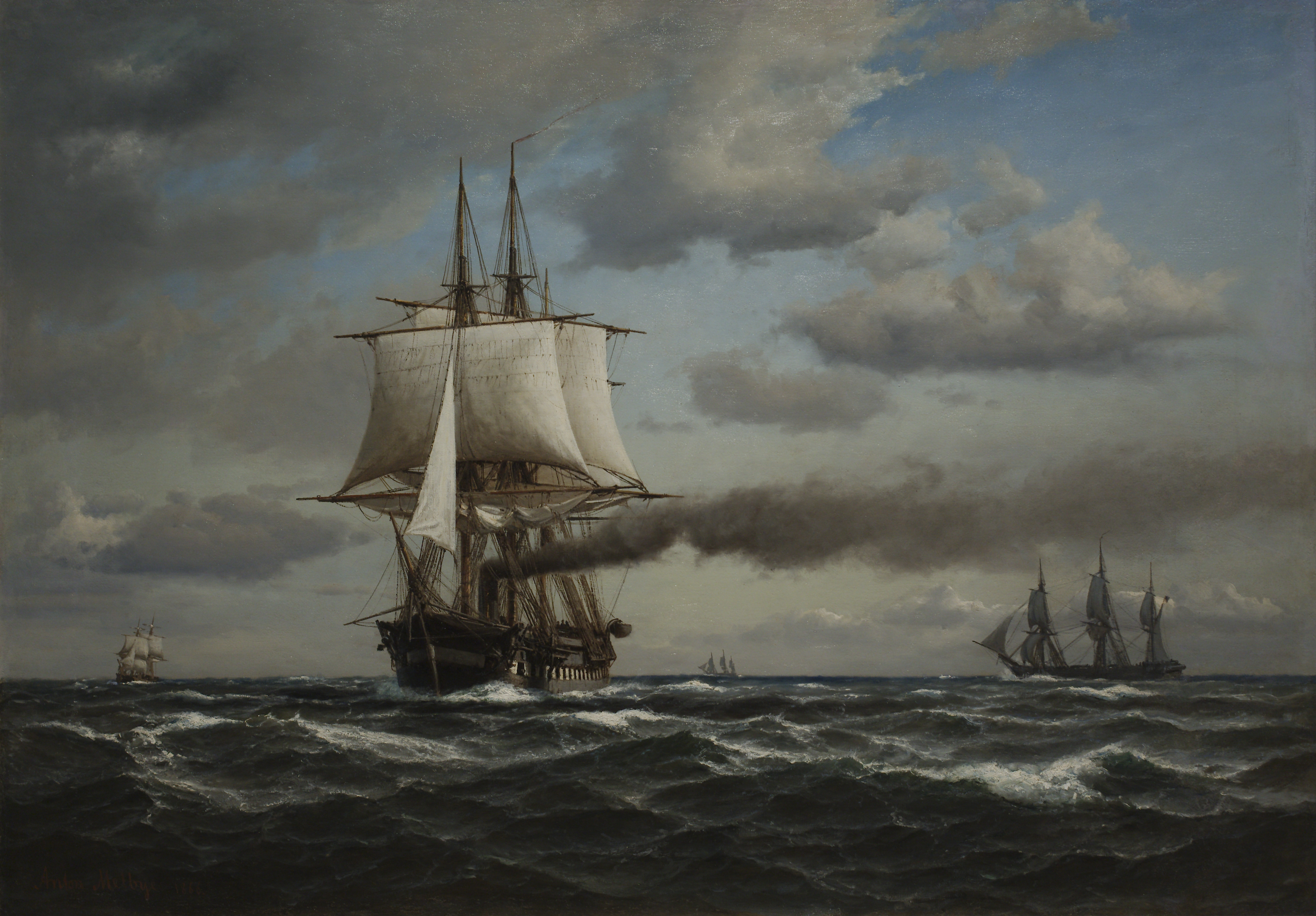
1866 painting of Jylland by Anton Melbye

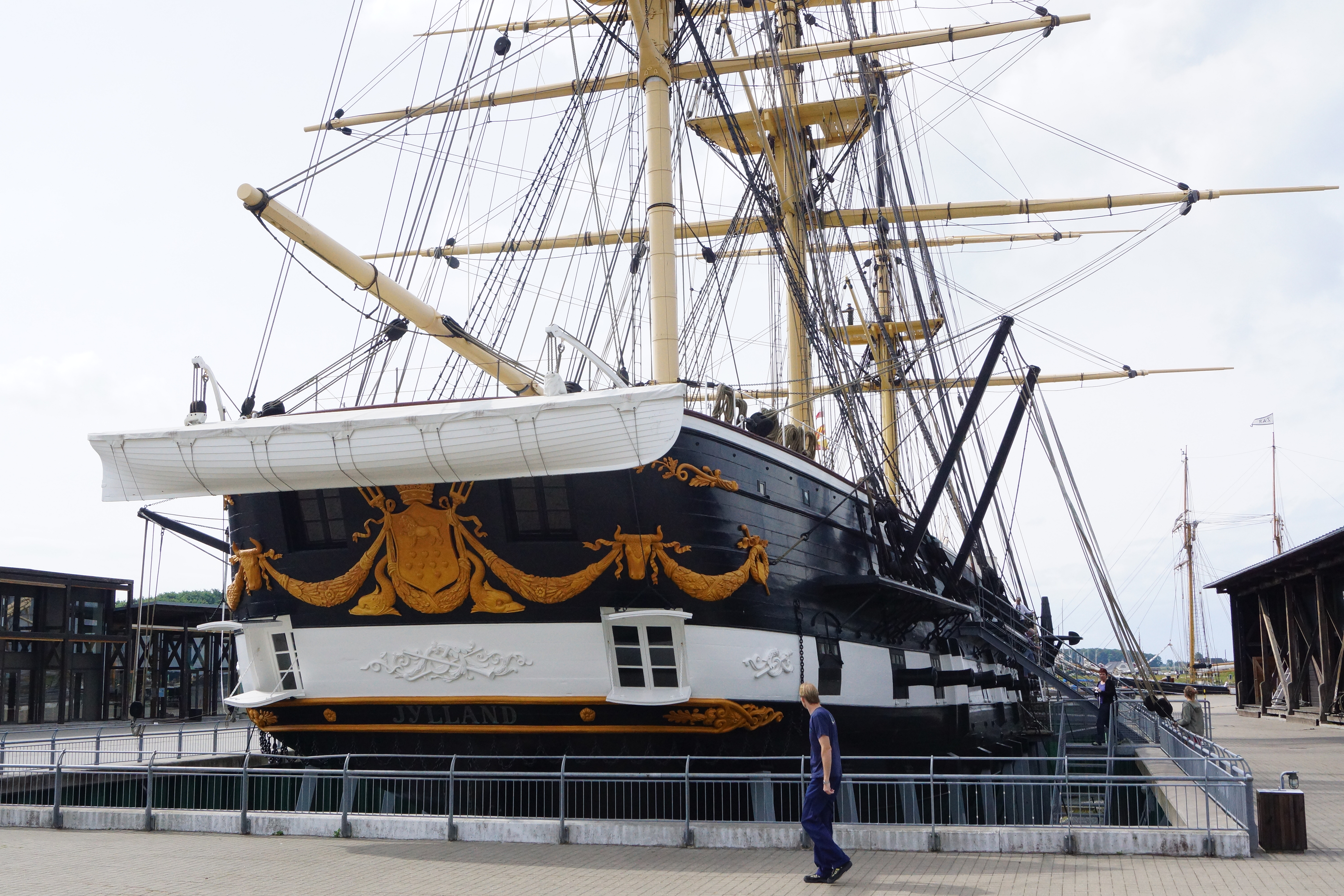
Stern of Jylland in 2013

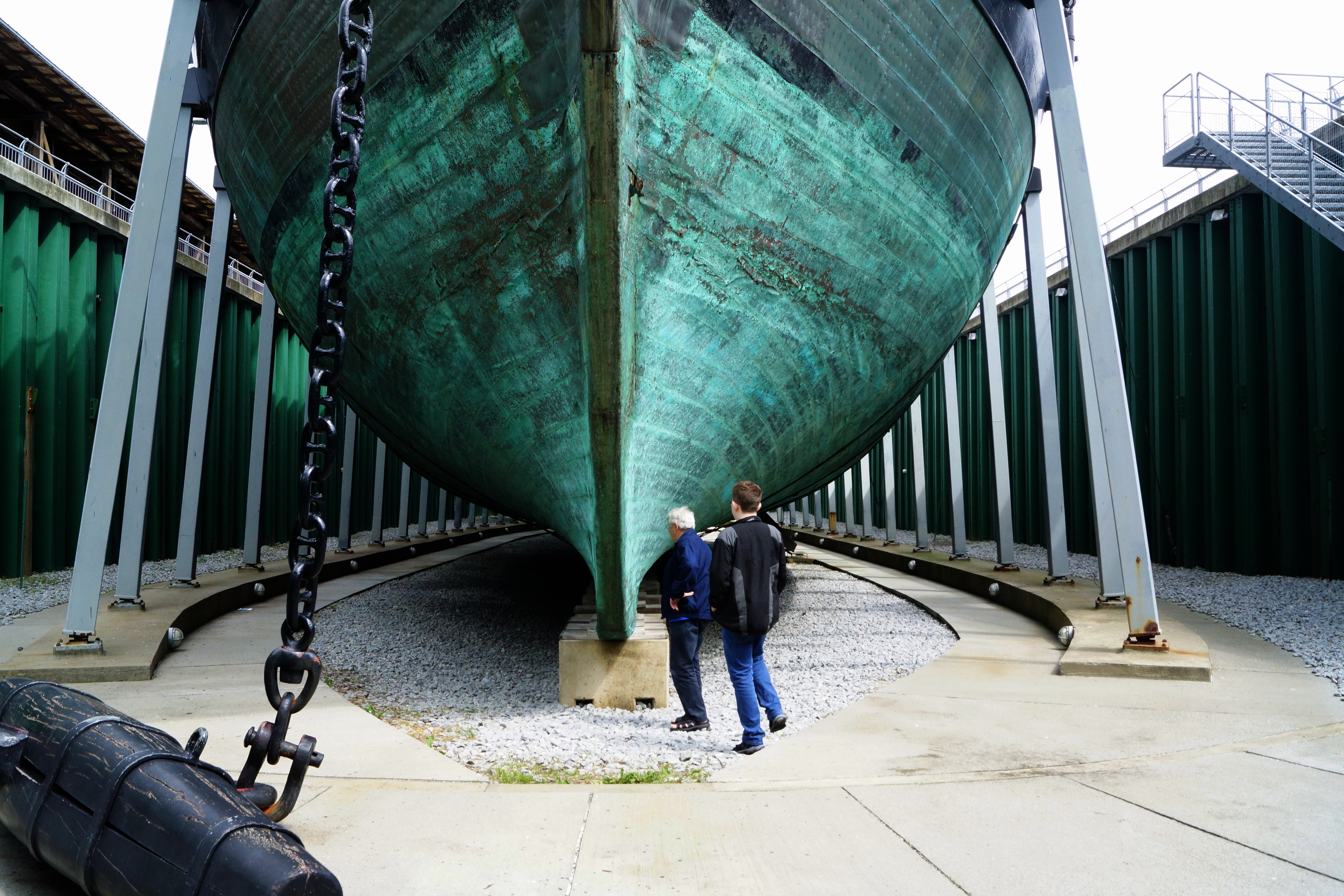
Jylland's hull in dry-dock

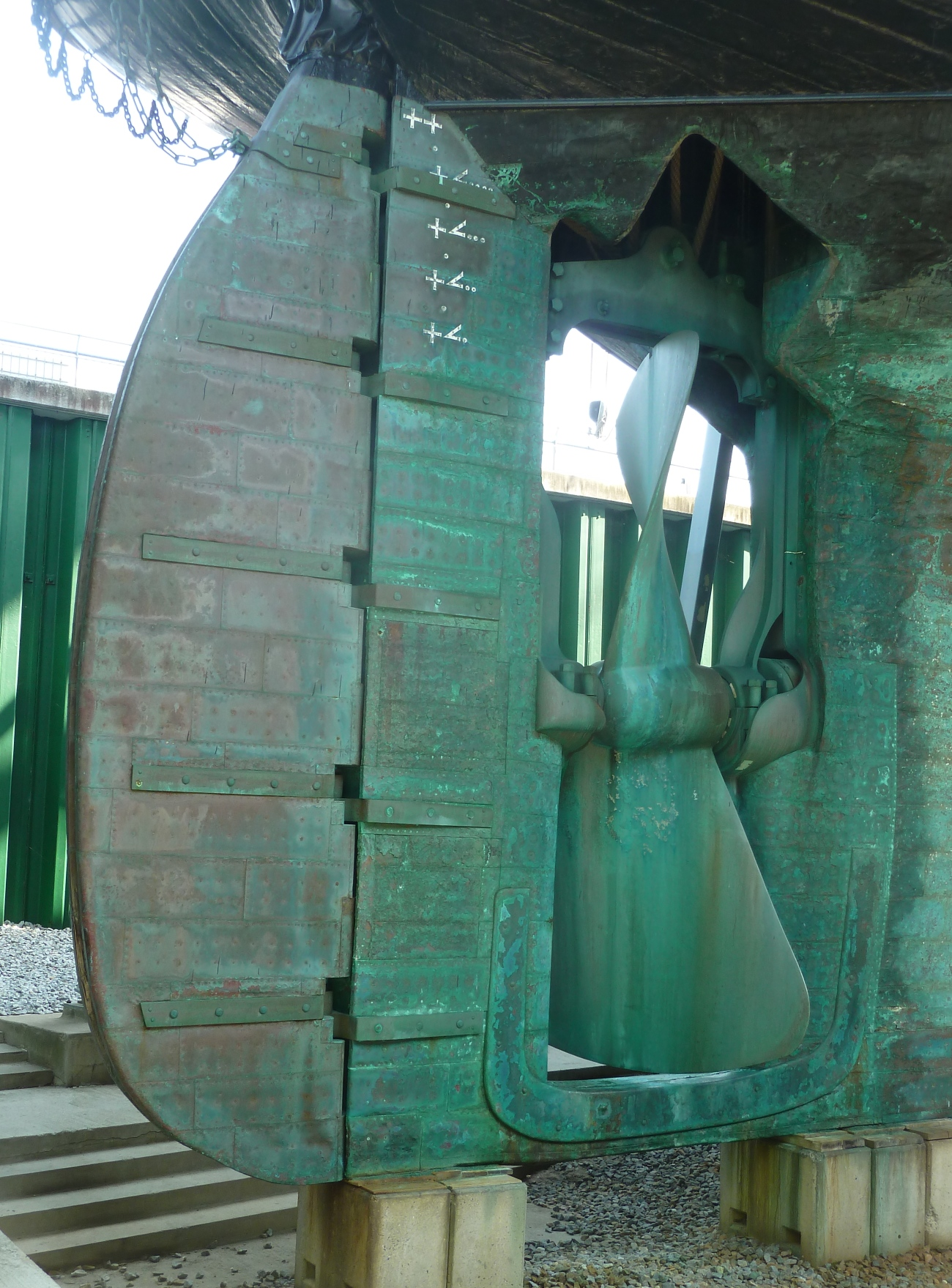
Propeller of Jylland

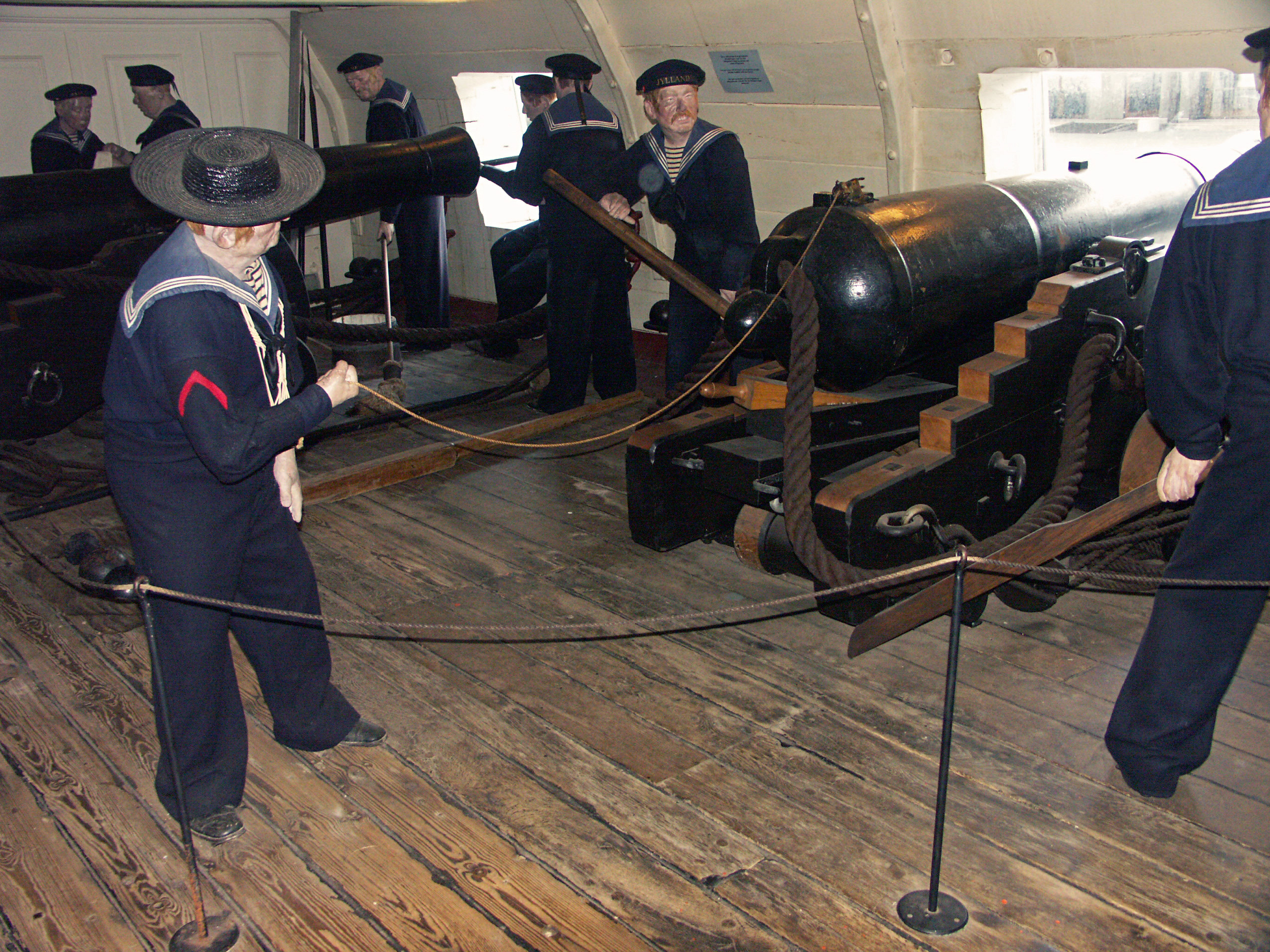
Jylland's battery deck

== Bibliography ==
- Brouwer, Norman J. The International Register of Historic Ships. 3rd ed. London: Chatham Publishing, 1999.
- Robert J Gardiner (ed.). Conway's All the World's Fighting Ships 1860–1905. London: Conway Maritime Press, 1979.

== See also ==
- List of large sailing vessels
