= Grenaa =

Grenaa Grenå
- Town
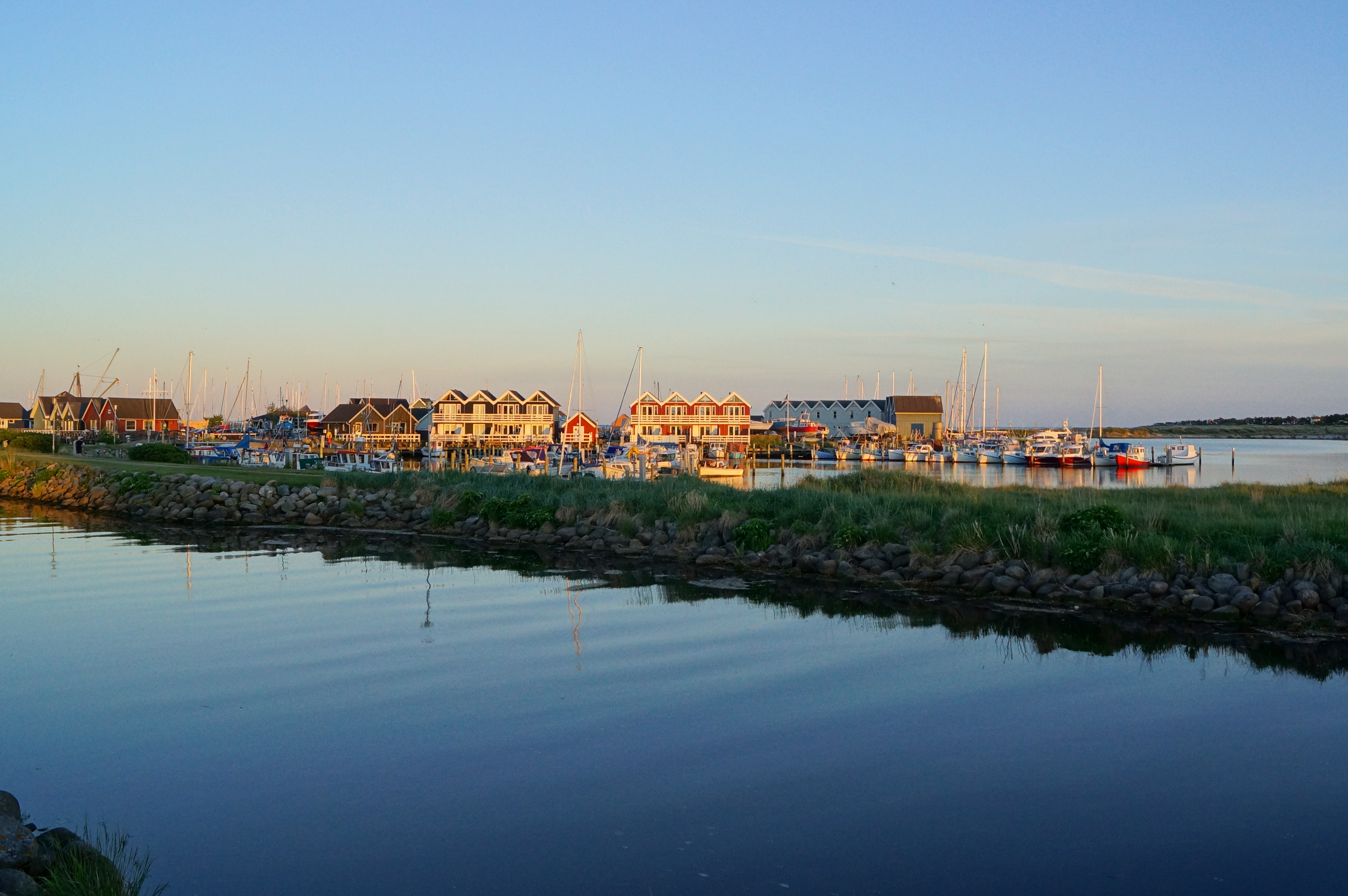
- Grenaa River (Gren Å) runs through the town, with Grenaa Marina in the background

- Coat of arms

- The location of Grenaa in Denmark on the peninsula, Djursland Grenaa (Central Denmark Region)
- Coordinates: 56.41608°N 10.89226°E
- Country: Denmark
- Region: Central Denmark Region (Midtjylland)
- Municipality: Norddjurs

Area
  - Urban: 10.5 km^{2} (4.1 sq mi)

Population (2026)
  - Urban: 13,978
  - Urban density: 1,330/km^{2} (3,450/sq mi)
  - Gender: 6,869 males and 7,109 females
- Time zone: UTC+1 (CET)
  - Summer (DST): UTC+2 (CEST)
- Postal code: 8500
- Website: www.igrenaa.dk

Grenaa (or Grenå) is a Danish town and seaport on the east coast of the Jutland peninsula. Tourism, education and commerce are important sectors in the economy of Grenaa. It is the only larger town on Djursland. Grenaa is the municipal seat, and the largest town, in Norddjurs Municipality, which covers the northern half of Djursland.

== History ==
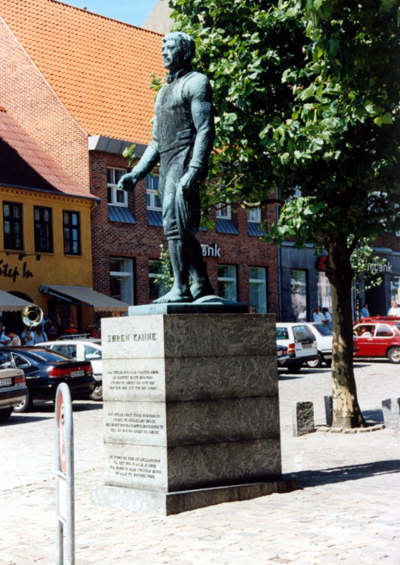
Søren Kanne (1801–1860) was a Grenaa farmer who came to fame in the 1830s heroically rescuing a shipwrecked skipper by the help of his two horses, according to legend. Photo: Jakob Øhlenschlæger

Grenaa was first mentioned in 1231. It was granted the official Kong-certified status of a market town in 1445.

== Economy ==
Grenaa has a lingering production industry just as in most of the western world. Development of tourism and educational institutions is sought to play a larger role for Grenaa in the future. The 5 km sandy Grenaa Beach is significant for tourism, with a hinterland of summer cottages, including many rentals. Grenaa is a regional shopping centre for central-eastern Djursland, an about 40 km x 40 km peninsula, protruding into the sea, between Denmark and Sweden at the entrance to the Baltic Sea.

=== Tourism ===
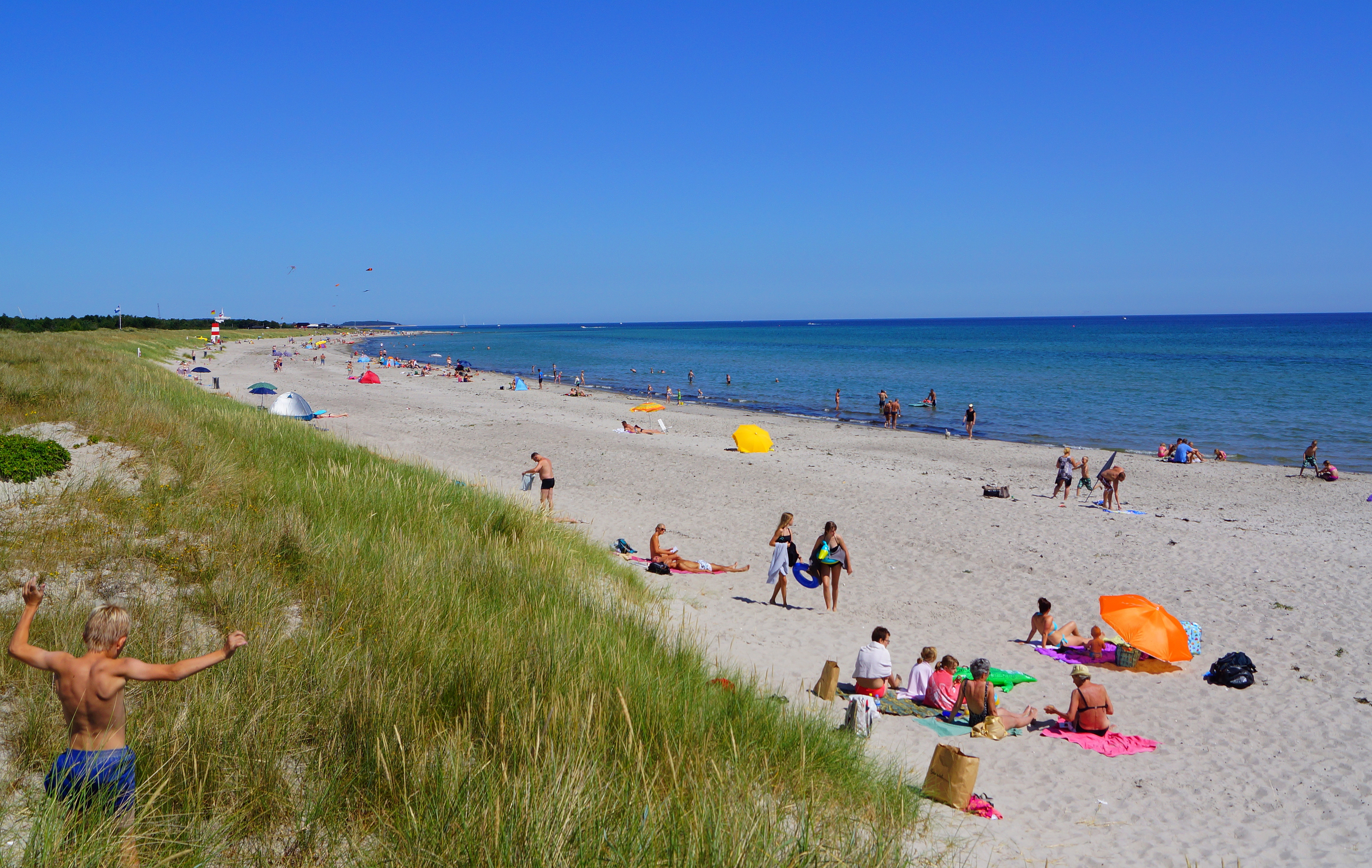
Grenaa Beach

With 14.601 (2014) inhabitants Grenaa is also the largest town on the c. 40 km x 40 km peninsula, Djursland, where coastal tourism is important. Djursland has 22 sandy beaches along the three-sided 260 km coastline, with in the order of 7.000 summer-, and out of season-, rentals, primarily close to the coast and beaches. Grenaa Beach can be seen as the best of the beaches on Djursland, as it was elected as the best beach in Denmark in 2006. All coastlines in Denmark are accessible to the public by law, contributing to making the walkable and unspoilt coastlines of Djursland an asset for Grenaa's tourism.

== Climate ==
The climate is coastal temperate, influenced by the Gulf Stream. Westerly and south-westerly winds are common. The yearly precipitation is 700 mm (28 in). The average summer temperature is 16 °C (61 °F). The coldest month is January with an average temperature of 0.5 °C (32.9 °F).

== Demographics ==
The geographical region, Djursland, where Grenaa is situated on the east coast, has an average population density of 42 inhabitants per square km, as compared to 407 for neighboring England and 230 for Germany. This, combined with the long coastlines, means that it seldom gets crowded on the coast and beaches. Something that also applies to the geologically varied often roling-hill country-side and farmland of Djursland, of which a bit more than 10% is forest.

== Transport ==
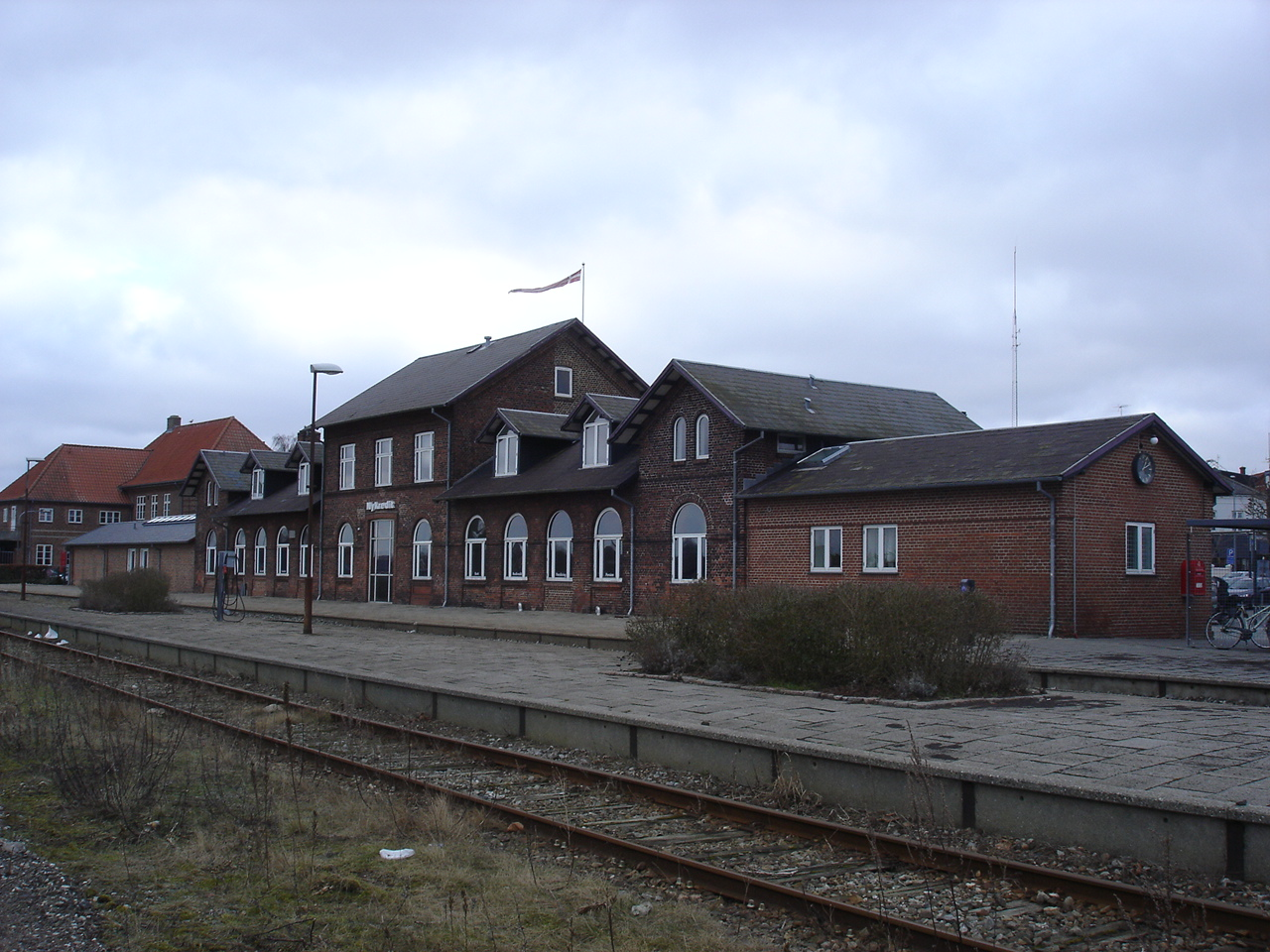
Grenaa railway station

Grenaa has a commercial seaport that has been expanded in recent years. The town is connected by ferry to Halmstad in Sweden and the Danish island of Anholt.

The town is also connected by railway to Denmark's second largest city, Aarhus, 60 km to the south-east, and is served by Grenaa railway station, terminus of the Aarhus-Grenaa railway line. The station offers direct local train services to Aarhus and Odder as part of the Aarhus Light Rail system. The southern part of the town is also served by the railway halt Hessel.

The nearest airport with scheduled national and international flights is Aarhus Airport which lies 20 km to the south-west from Grenaa.

== Points of interest ==
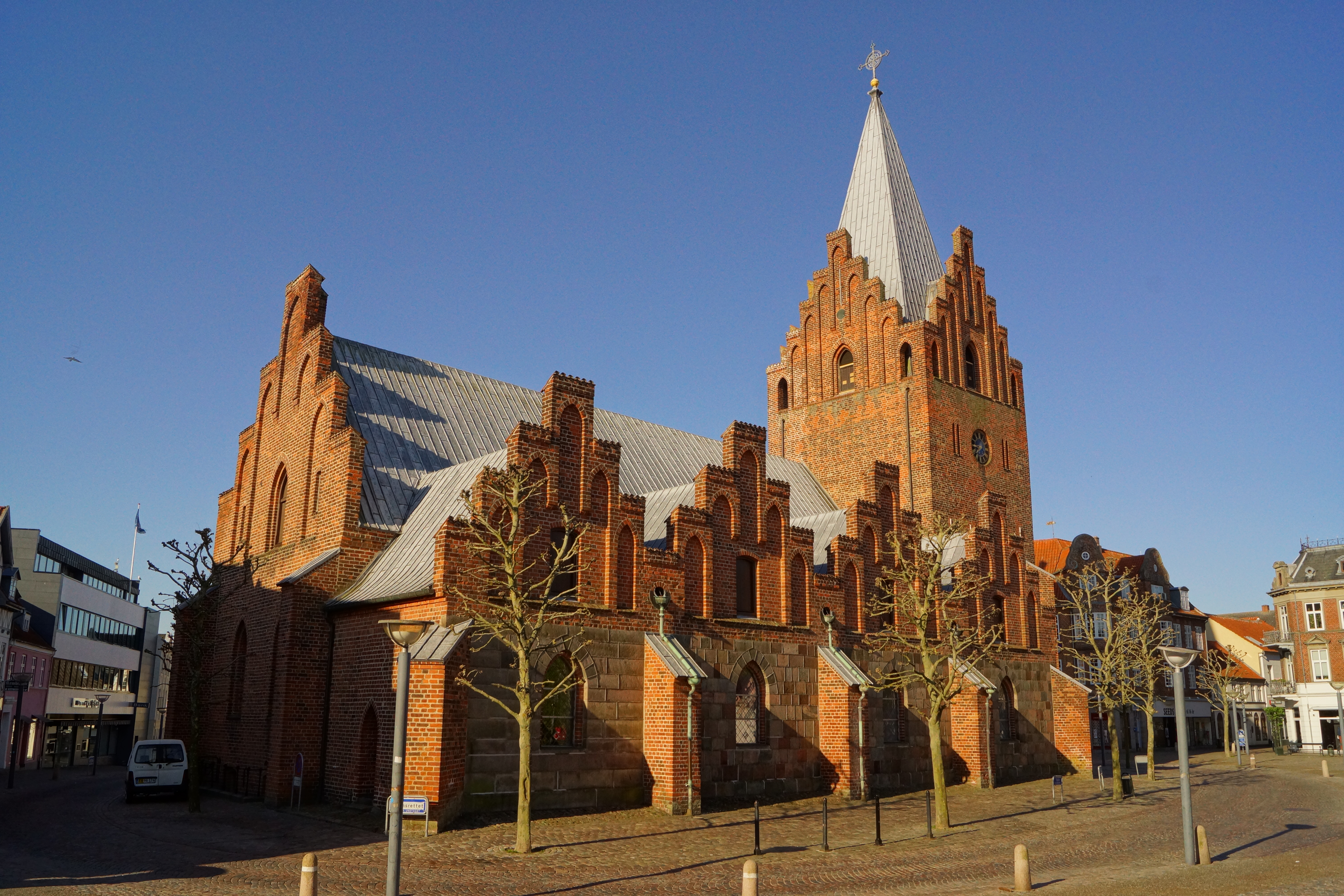
Grenaa Church

- Grenaa Beach – 5 km of sandy beach starting at Grenaa Marina. Nominated as one of 2 best Danish beaches in 2006
- Walks and hiking – North and south along the coastline from Grenaa, and along the other varied and accessible 260 km coastline of Djursland
- Fishing and diving – from Grenaa Beach and east and south of Grenaa along the 50 km east coast of Djursland
- Cliffs of Sangstrup and Karlby – Fossil rich coastal lime cliffs 8 km north of Grenaa
- Kattegatcentret – Aquarium by the Sea in Grenaa with large sharks and a focus on Nordic salt water fish. 250 species of marine creatures from around the world, including seals.
- Grenaa Marina – marine environment with cafes, etc.
- Djurslands Museum & Danish Fisheries Museum in Grenaa
- Baunhøj Mill, View overlooking Grenaa and countryside
- Mushroom picking in the forests and non-farmed areas of Djursland from August, through autumn until first frost. Such as in, Plantagen, a wood starting at the southern end of Grenaa
- Dansk Motor- og Maskinsamling / The Machine Collection with the largest collection of historical stationary engines in Northern Europe going back to 1860. Restored and functioning. 2 km from Grenaa
- Sea trout and other fresh water fishing in Gren å, running through Grenaa, and in the adjoining, Sound of Kolind, canal system
- Salt water fishing from the coasts north and south of Grenaa. Such as for sea trout, mackerel place and garfish
- Randers Regnskov – Zoo – Rain forest zoo by the river, Gudenaa, in transparent domes representing different continents. 60 km from Grenaa
- Aarhus – Denmark's second largest town, with several international attractions, such as, The Old Town, Den gamle By, 60 km from Grenaa
- Fjord og Kystcentret – visiting centre related to Randers Fjord in Voer 45 km from Grenaa – focus on activities with regard to fish, fishing and shore biology, exhibits, boat rentals, and guided tours. Mini car ferry across Randers Fjord
- Herring fishing at Voer in Randers Fjord – seasonal – 45 km from Grenaa
- Kalø Castle – ruined castle on a peninsula with bights, inlets on southern Djursland 35 km from Grenaa
- Mols Bjerge National Park – Hilly ice age like steppe landscape – walks, sightseeing drives, and horseback riding, on southern Djursland 30 km south of Grenaa
- Djurslands medieval country churches. Thorsager church is the only round church in Jutland. Udby church by Randers Fjord is a picturesque navigation mark for incoming ships
- Kalø Vintage Car Rally (Tirsdagstræf) – Popular gatherings for motor enthusiasts, every Tuesday afternoon and evening except in winter, close to Kalø Castle Ruin on southern Djursland, 32 km from Grenaa
- Djurs Sommerland – Amusement park. The largest attraction on Djursland with regard to number of visitors. 22 km from Grenaa
- The Agricultural Museum, Landbrugsmuseet, Farmlife through the times. Extensive historical vegetable gardens and fruit orchards at Gl. Estrup Castle, by the town, Auning, 35 km from Grenaa
- The Manor Museum, Herregårdsmuseet, at Gl. Estrup Castle, by the town, Auning, 35 km from Grenaa
- Katholm Castle, 6 km south of Grenaa
- Rosenholm Castle – by Hornslet, plus other castles and manor houses on Djursland
- Golf – Lübker Golf Resort by Nimtofte, also other golfing and golf-resorts such as by Grenaa-, Ebeltoft and Uggelbølle
- Munkholm Zoo – Zoo for families with small children. Including friendly animals, and no long walks. 14 km from Grenaa
- Ree Safari Park – Zoo – In hills including savanna-like landscapes. Also large animals. 22 km from Grenaa
- Skandinavisk Dyrepark – Zoo – Park with extensive Nordic wildlife including brown- and polar bears. 22 km from Grenaa
- Glasmuseet, Ebeltoft. Modern international glass art and craftsmanship. Also local glass-craft workshops in the Ebeltoft-area. 31 km from Grenaa
- Jylland, Ebeltoft – One of the world's largest wooden warships, restoration for 15 million euros completed in 1998. 31 km from Grenaa
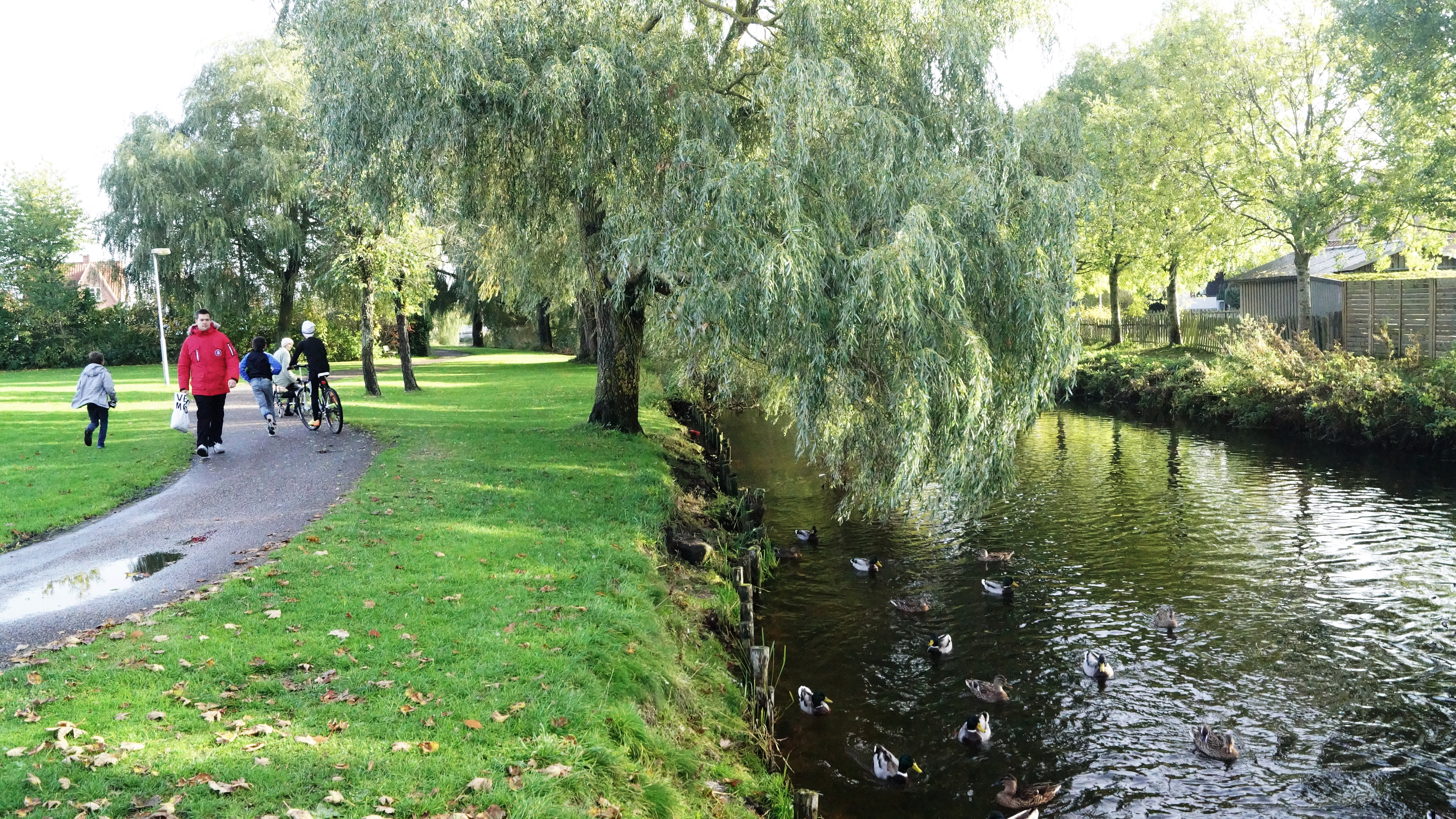
The river Gren Å runs through Grenaa

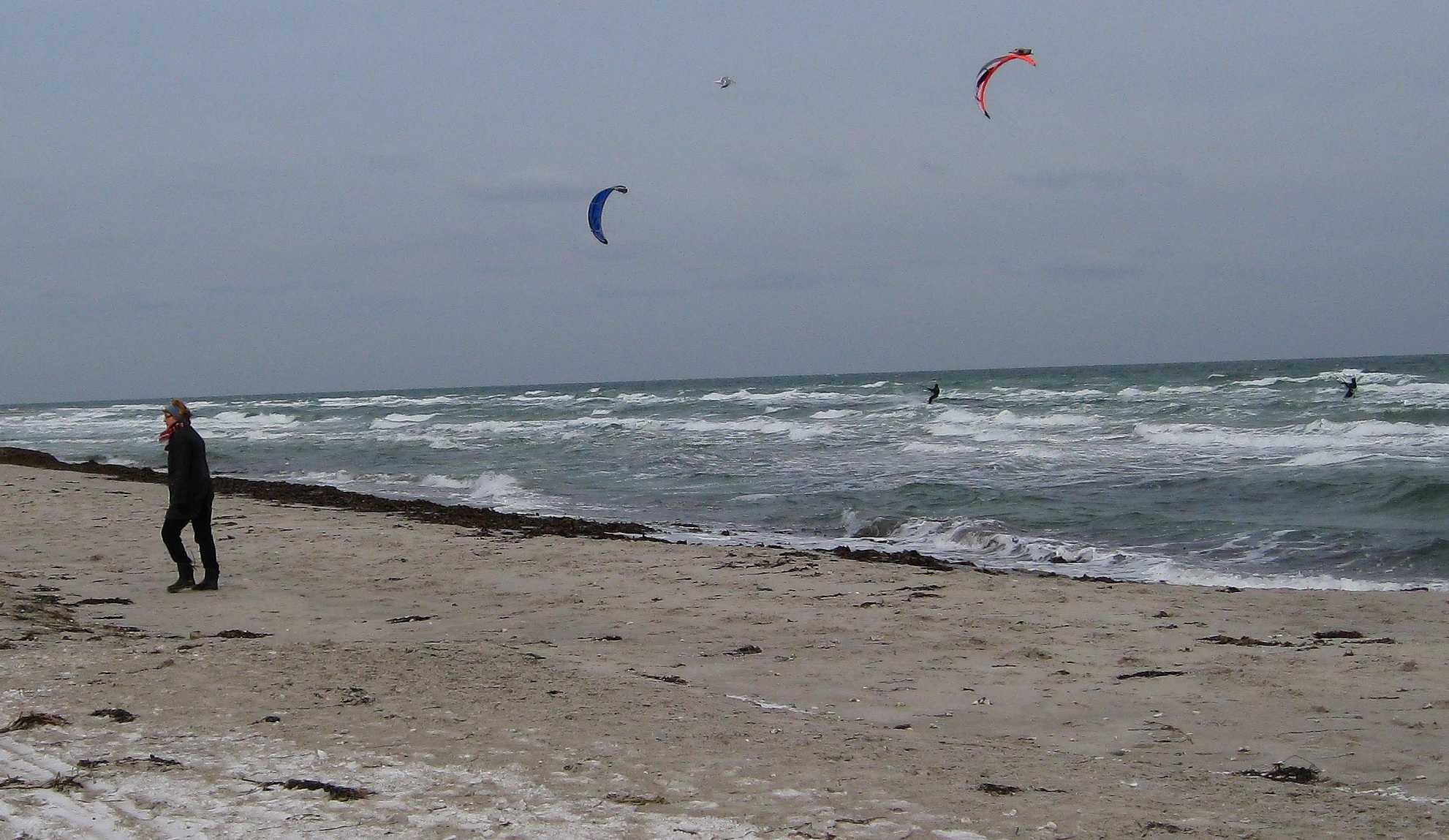
Winter kite-surfing at Grenaa Beach

== Notable people ==
August Krogh

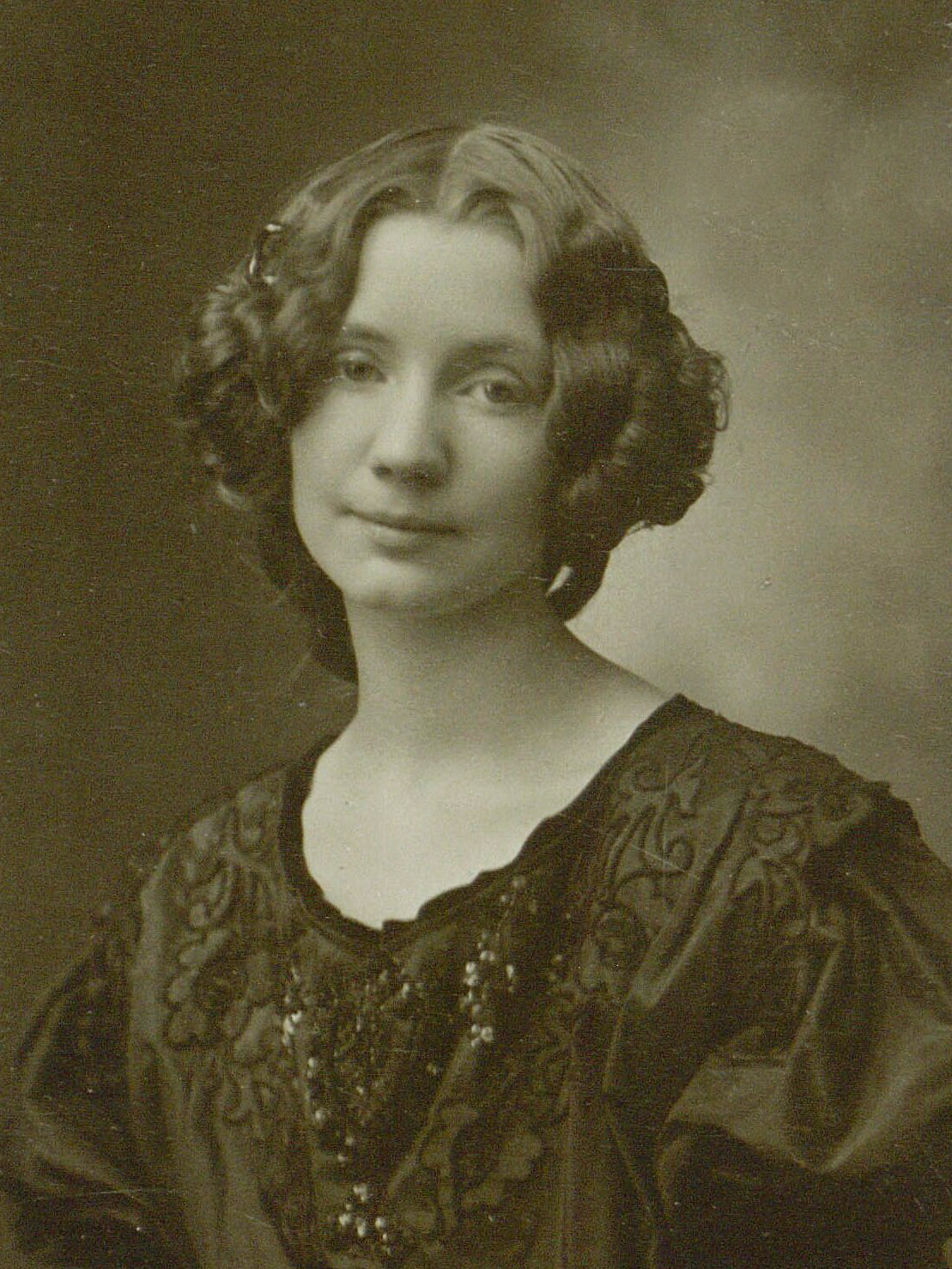
Gerda Wegener, 1904

- Hans Broge (1822–1908) a Danish merchant and politician
- Frits Hartvigson (1841–1919) a Danish pianist and teacher, spent many years in England
- Christian Zacho (1843–1913) a Danish landscape painter of Danish beech woods
- Ludvig Kabell (1853 in Vejlby – 1902) a Danish landscape painter
- Hans Peter Mareus Neilsen Gammel (1854–1931) emigrated to Texas c.1880, an author on the laws of Texas and a bookseller
- Julie Laurberg (1856–1925) an early Danish photographer, also active in women's rights
- Peder Mørk Mønsted (1859 in Balle Mølle – 1941) a Danish realist painter of landscapes
- Achton Friis (1871 in Trustrup – 1939) a Danish illustrator, painter, writer and explorer
- August Krogh (1874–1949) a Danish professor at the dept. of animal physiology at the University of Copenhagen; awarded the Nobel Prize in Physiology or Medicine in 1920
- Olivia Holm-Møller (1875 in Homå – 1970) a Danish sculptor and painter of richly coloured, almost abstract paintings
- Gerda Wegener (1886 in Hammelev – 1940) a Danish illustrator and painter of Art Nouveau and later Art Deco images of fashionable women
- Søren Krarup (born 1937) a Danish pastor, writer, politician, member of the Folketing 2001–11
- Rebekka Mathew (born 1986) former child star, half of the Faroese pop duo Creamy
- Hans Ørberg (1920 in Store Andst – 2010) a Danish linguist and a teacher in Grenaa Gymnasium (1963–1988), the author of LINGVA LATINA PER SE ILLVSTRATA, (Note: The Latin language through itself illustrated) a widely used method for learning Latin through the natural method

=== Sport ===
- Peter Koefoed (1902 – 1983 in Grenaa) a Danish field hockey player, competed in the 1928 Summer Olympics
- Caspar Schrøder (1905 in Auning – 1989) a Danish fencer, competed at the 1936 Summer Olympics
- Hans-Henrik Ørsted (born 1954) a Danish former professional track cyclist, team bronze medallist at the 1980 Summer Olympics
- Steffen Rasmussen (born 1982 in Stenvad) a football goalkeeper with 404 caps with AGF Aarhus

== Localities ==
- Djursland
- Mols
- Mols Bjerge National Park
- Ebeltoft
- Glatved Beach
- Danish steam frigate Jylland
- Katholm Castle
- Kalø Castle
- Grenaa Beach
- Bønnerup Strand
- Cliffs of Sangstrup
- Lake Stubbe

== See also ==
- Aarhus (Århus), Ebeltoft and Randers – nearby cities
- Grenå RK
- Grenaa Gymnasium & HF – secondary school
