= Cliffs of Sangstrup =

Cliffs in Norddjurs Municipality, Denmark

Cliffs of Sangstrup, Denmark
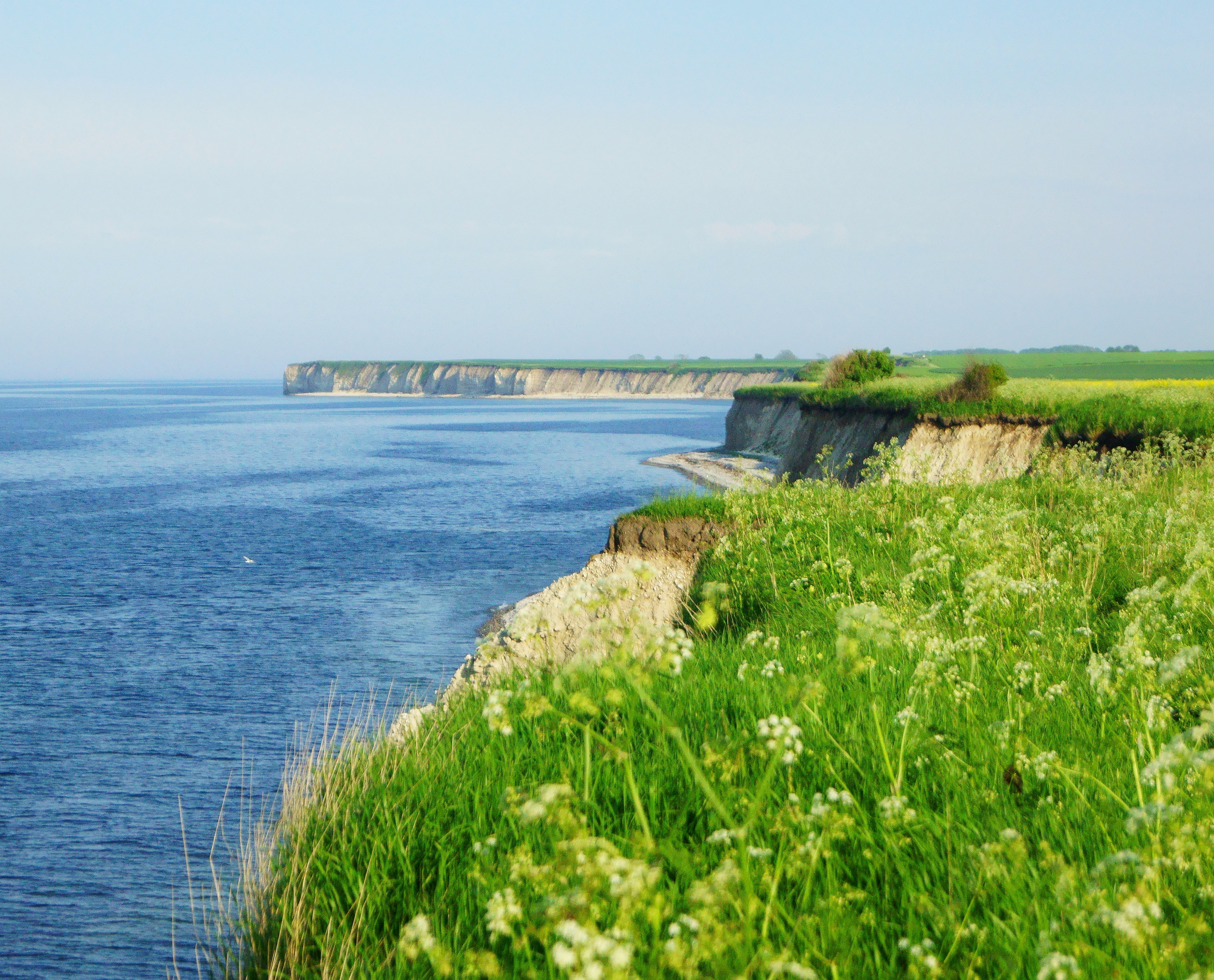
- Coastal Limestone Cliffs, facing the sea, Kattegat, between Denmark and Sweden

- Location within Denmark
- Location: Norddjurs Municipality
- Coordinates: 56°27′26.88″N 10°51′45.15″E

The Cliffs of Sangstrup and Karlby in Denmark, Northern Europe, at the entrance to the Baltic Sea, are two, up to 17 meters tall, and 5 km long coastal limestone cliffs originating from a 65-million-year-old coral reef in a prehistoric and tropical Danish sea. Today the climate in Denmark is coastal temperate.

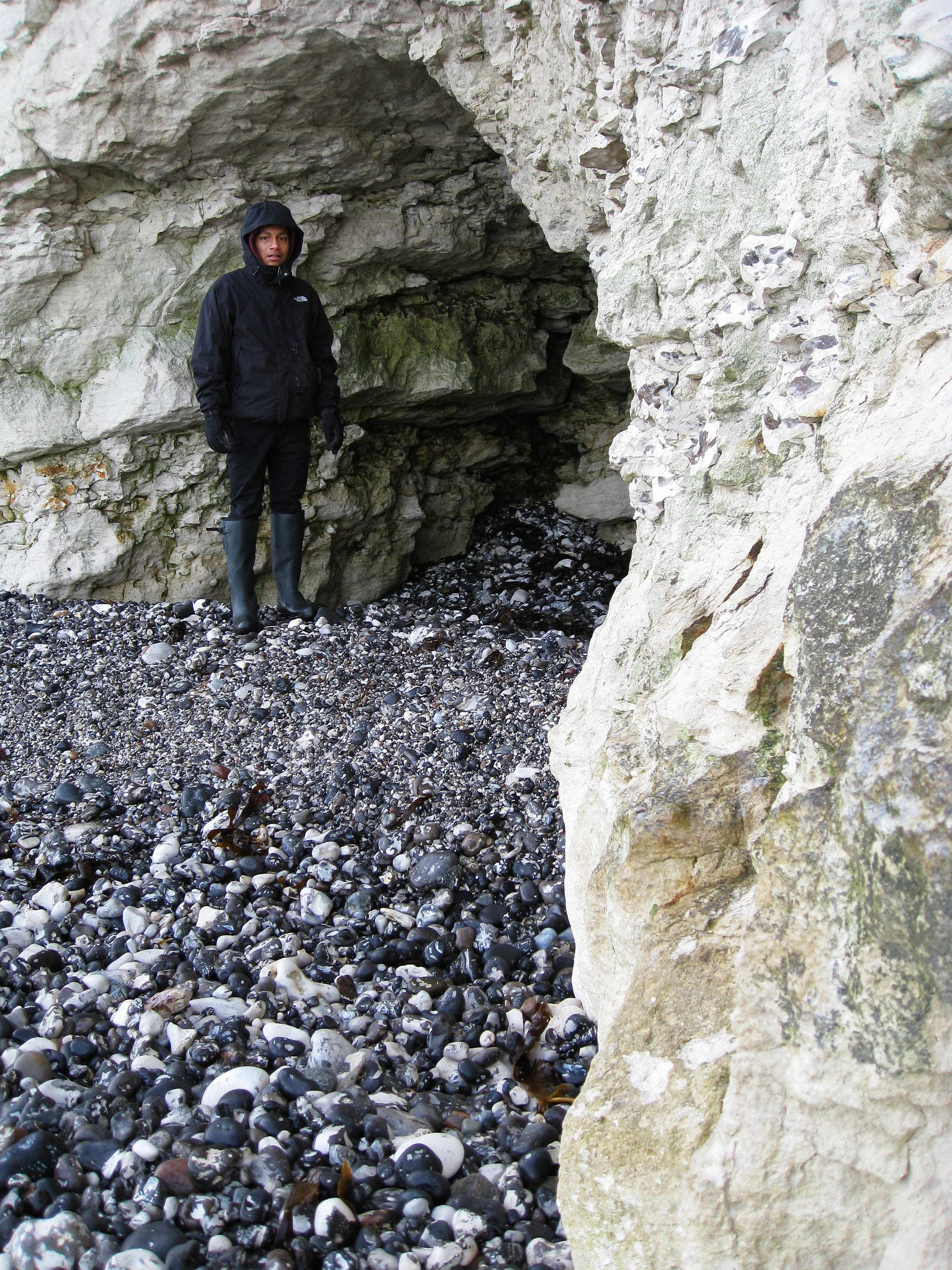
Waves have eroded a number of caves into the cliffs

It is possible – and legal for anyone – to search for fossils in the cliffs. New cliff material is exposed regularly due coastal erosion, prompting rock falls. Here and there corroded cannonball holes can be found in the cliffs, supposedly from target shooting performed by German warships during World War II.

Some places the sea has hollowed out caves into the cliff wall. Mostly there is a narrow shoreline in front of the cliffs, although some coves are isolated and only accessible from the shore when the tide is out. The tidal difference is moderate, normally in the range of 30 cm (one foot) on this east-facing coastline shielded from the more exposed west-facing Atlantic coastlines of Europe.

The cliffs are not very known, not even among local residents on the peninsula, Djursland, where they are situated on the north-east coast facing Sweden 100 km across the sea. Djursland is a circa 40 km x 40 km peninsula with a population of 80.000 inhabitants and a population density of 42 per square kilometer.

The Cliffs of Sangstrup and Karlby are sought out by anglers, and snorkel- and scuba divers. The underwater topography consists of limestone outcrops with cliffs and crevasses among forests of kelp.

Access to the cliffs by car is possible at The Bight of Hjembæk, 10 km north of the town, Grenaa. Here the Cliffs of Karlby stretch to the north and the Cliffs of Sangstrup to the south.

== Geological formation ==
The rocky limestone and flint seen as The Cliffs of Sangstrup (Sangstrup Klint, in Danish) is part of a geological formation, Danien, that can also be seen at the surface on one of the south easterly islands of Denmark, Møn, as The Cliffs of Møn (Danish: Møns Klint) 160 km south east of Sangstrup.

The formation also surfaces in northern Denmark, south of the town of Aalborg, where the limestone is used as a raw material for production of cement in a large scale.

== Burnt lime ==
In the sea out from Sangstrup the limestone bedrock stretches underwater south along the coast. 20 km south of Sangstrup Klint at, Glatved, an industrial kiln at the end of Glatved Strandvej converted limestone extracted from the coast and the hills to burnt lime. This stopped at the turn of the century. Burnt lime was, and to some extent still is, commonly used for white washing of traditional Danish country houses and country churches. Lime extraction in this region of eastern Djursland stretches several hundred years back.

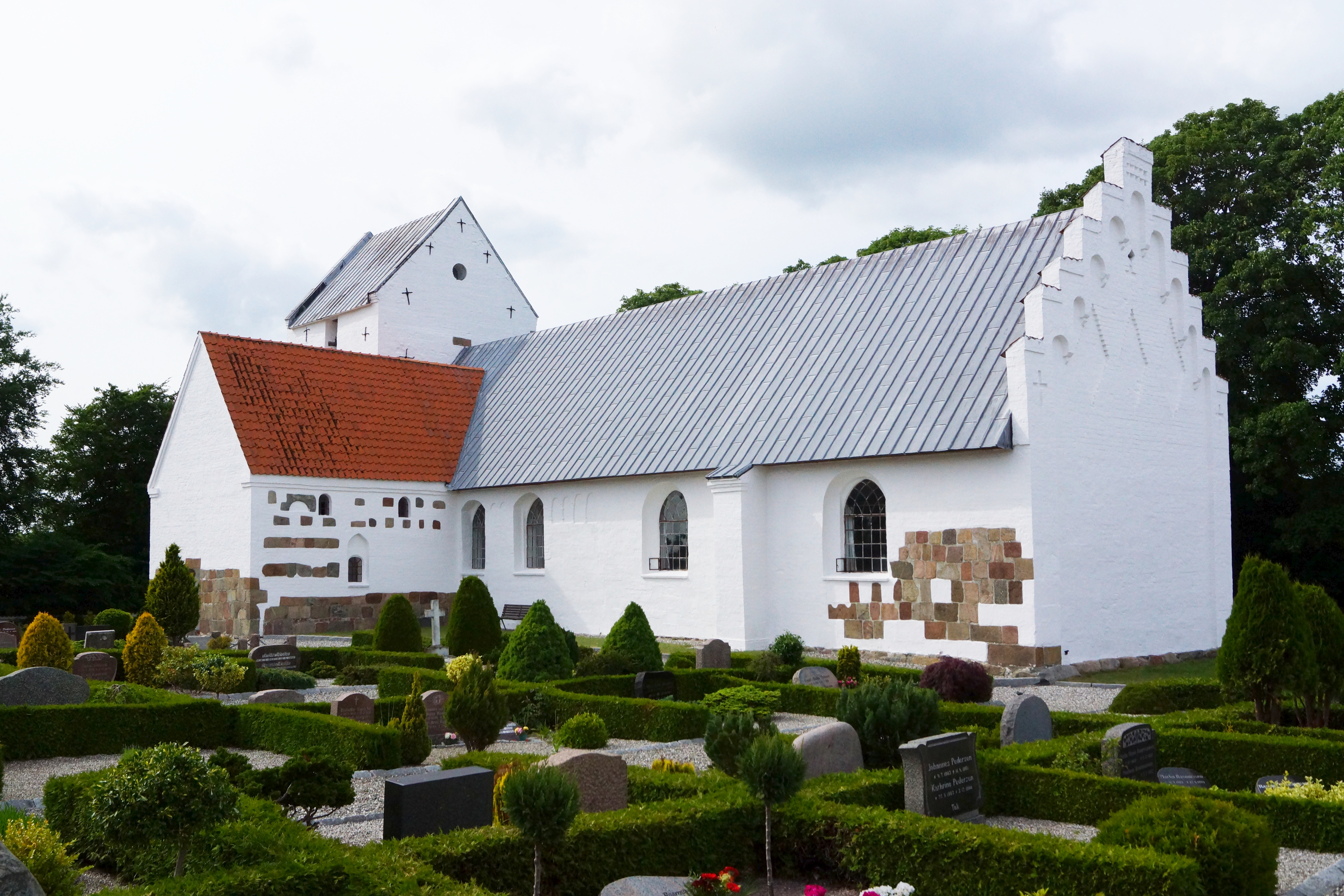
Nødager Church

The country church in Nødager, located centrally on the Djursland peninsula, is not only white washed with lime, the building is also built from limestone, just as 8 eight other country churches in the peninsula, Djursland. In the case of Nødager church the stones where sailed down the coast and inland from a quarry by Sangstrup around year 1150.

At that time a sound, Kolindsund cut centrally into the peninsula, making transport by ship possible. Today Kolindsund is farmland. After the sounds estuary sanded over in the Middle Ages, at what is now Grenaa Beach, the sound became a lake for some centuries until 1870, when it was pumped dry and converted into the farmland it is today.

The Lime from Sangstrup and the east coast of Djursland has not only been used for white washing. Burnt lime is also a main ingredient in mortar used for building with bricks.

== Gallery ==
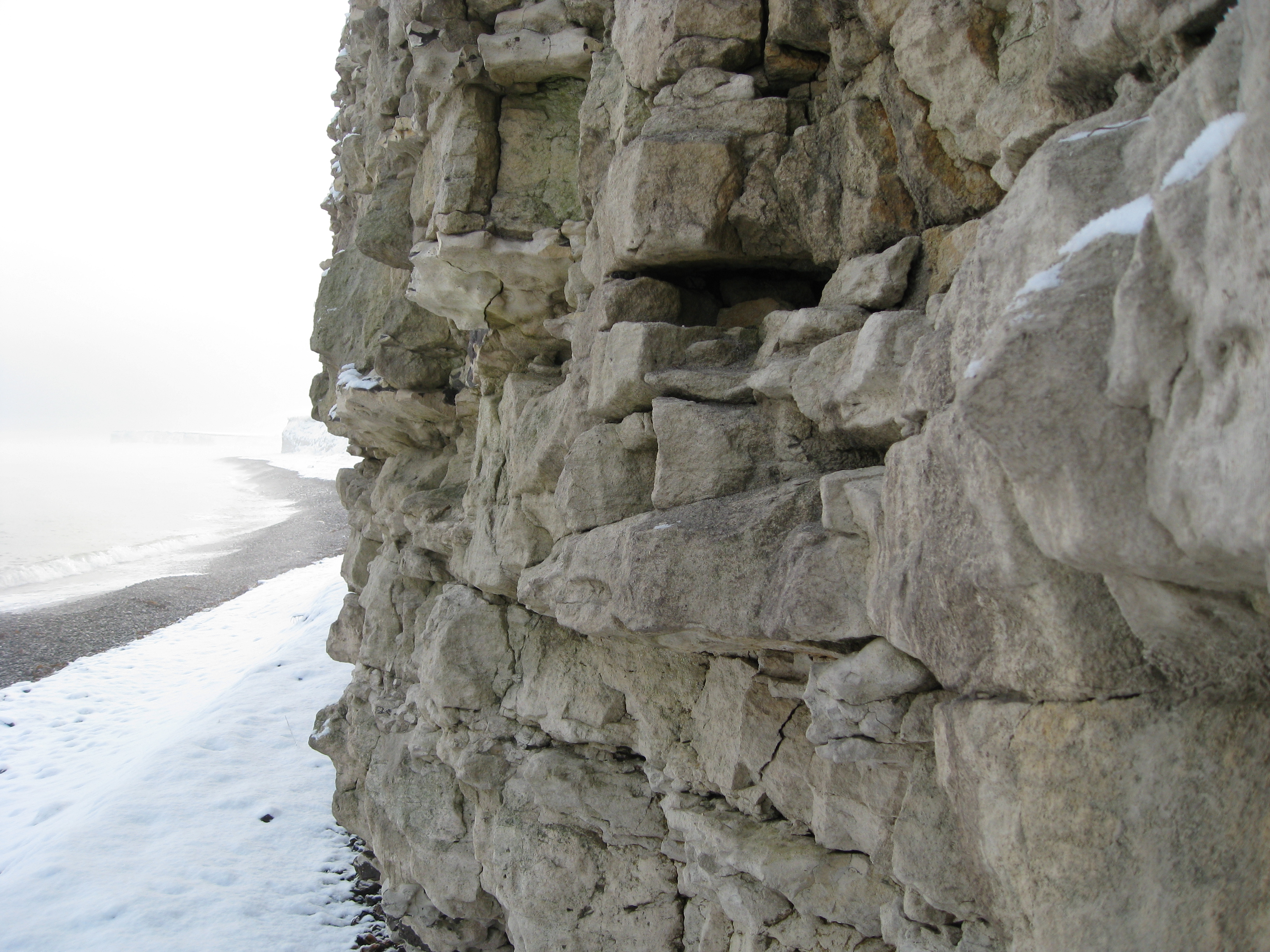
The cliffs originate from a 65 million year old coral reef, and appear as rocky cliffs of lime and flint along the coast

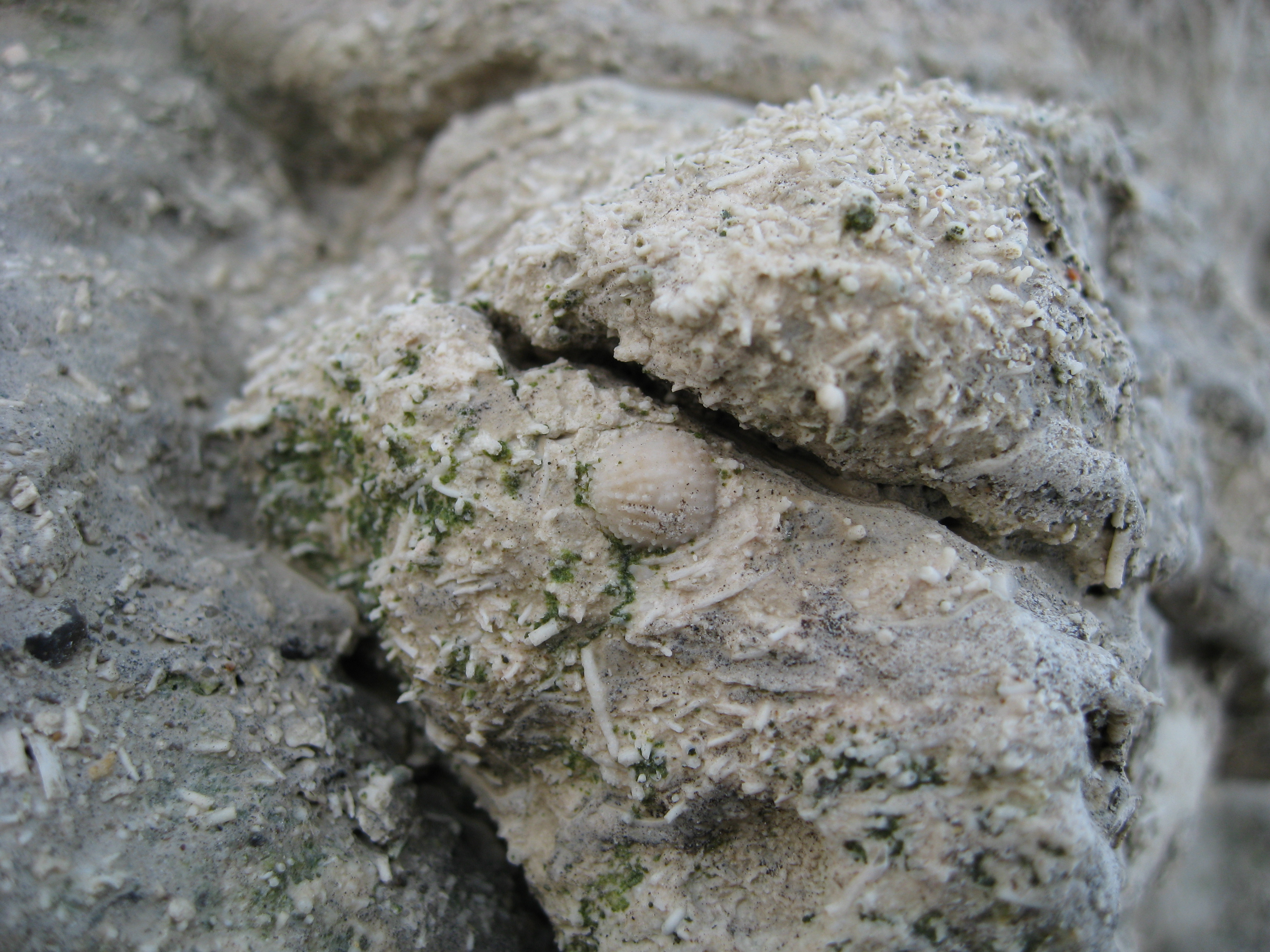
Close up of clint wall with several fossils

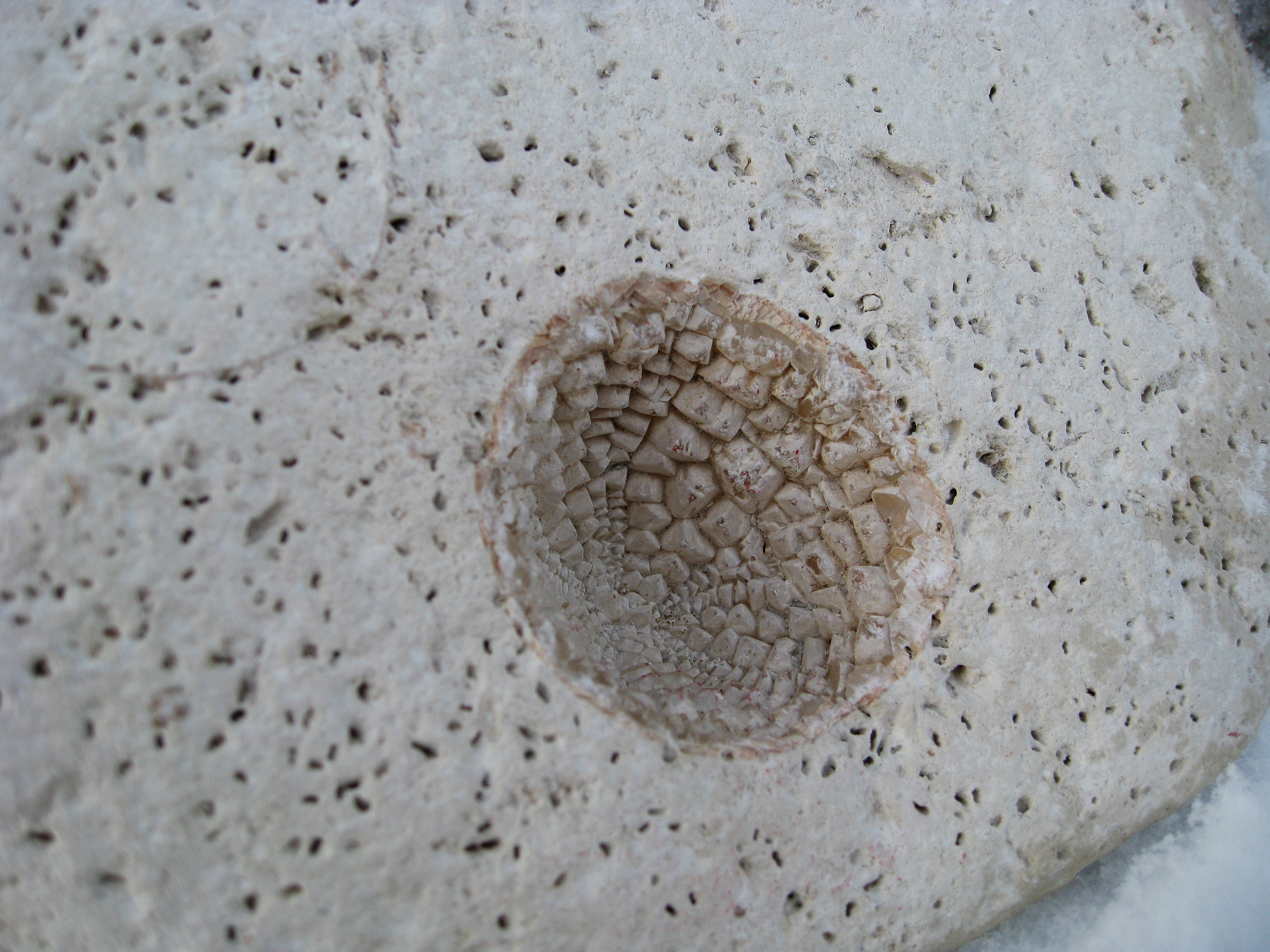
Limestone with crystallized imprint of a Sea Urchin found on the coast at Sangstrup Klint
