= Grenå RK =

- Full name: Grenå Rugby Klub
- Location: Grenå, Denmark
- Chairman: Nicklas Horup

Grenå RK is a Danish rugby club in Grenå. They were presumably inactive for a number of years, but are now playing again, though in combination with other teams due to lack of player numbers.
