= Grenaa Gymnasium & HF =

School in Denmark

Coordinates: 56°24′28.83″N 10°53′19.79″E

Grenaa Gymnasium is a secondary school in Grenaa, Denmark. The school has three types of education, Gymnasium, HF and IB.

The school comprises two buildings connected by an umbilical. The first – often referred to as the old part – was built in 1964, the second – often referred to as the new part – in 1973. Classrooms are subject specific with science and cultural classrooms in the old part, and with humanities, social sciences, and mathematics in the new building. Because the school has subject-specific classrooms, long distances between them have been avoided by having them all face a centre of the buildings. The centre of the first building is a large cloakroom and an assembly hall. The second building is built in two open levels with the classrooms on the upper floor and a large common area with a canteen, reading area, and library on the lower level.
