= Peder Mørk Mønsted =

Danish painter (1859–1941)

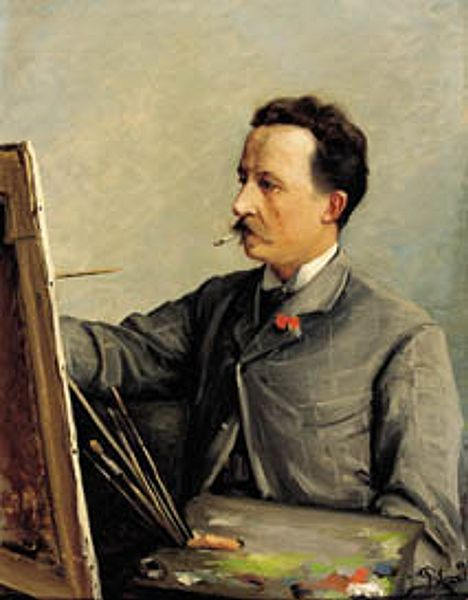
- 1895 portrait by Sigvard Hansen
- Born: 10 December 1859; Balle Mølle, near Grenaa Denmark
- Died: 20 June 1941 (aged 81); Fredensborg, Denmark
- Education: Royal Danish Academy of Fine Arts
- Known for: Painter

Peder Mørk Mønsted (10 December 1859 – 20 June 1941) was a Danish realist painter. He is best known for his landscape paintings in a realistic style. His favorite motifs include snowy winter landscapes, still water and forests.

== Biography ==
Mønsted was born at Balle Mølle near Grenå, Denmark. He was the son of Otto Christian Mønsted and Thora Johanne Petrea Jorgensen. His father was a prosperous ship-builder. At an early age, he began receiving painting lessons at the art school in Aarhus. From 1875 to 1879, he studied at the Royal Academy of Fine Arts with Niels Simonsen and Julius Exner. In 1878, Mønsted studied under the artist Peder Severin Krøyer. In 1882, he spent some time in Rome and Capri then, the following year, visited Paris, where he worked in the studios of William Adolphe Bouguereau. He gradually developed a personal style of academic naturalism.

Mønsted was a habitual traveler. In 1889, he went to Algeria. Three years later, he travelled to Greece, where he was a guest of King George I, who had been born a Danish prince. While there, he also did portraits of the Greek royal family. After that, he visited Egypt and Spain. During his later years, he spent a great deal of time in Switzerland and travelling throughout the Mediterranean. His travels produced numerous sketches that became paintings he presented at several international exhibitions. He was especially popular in Germany, where he held several shows at the Glaspalast in Munich.

Mønsted died on 20 June 1941 and is buried in Garnison Cemetery, Copenhagen.

Most of his works are in private collections. In 1995, a major retrospective, called "Light of the North", was held in Frankfurt am Main.

== Selected paintings ==
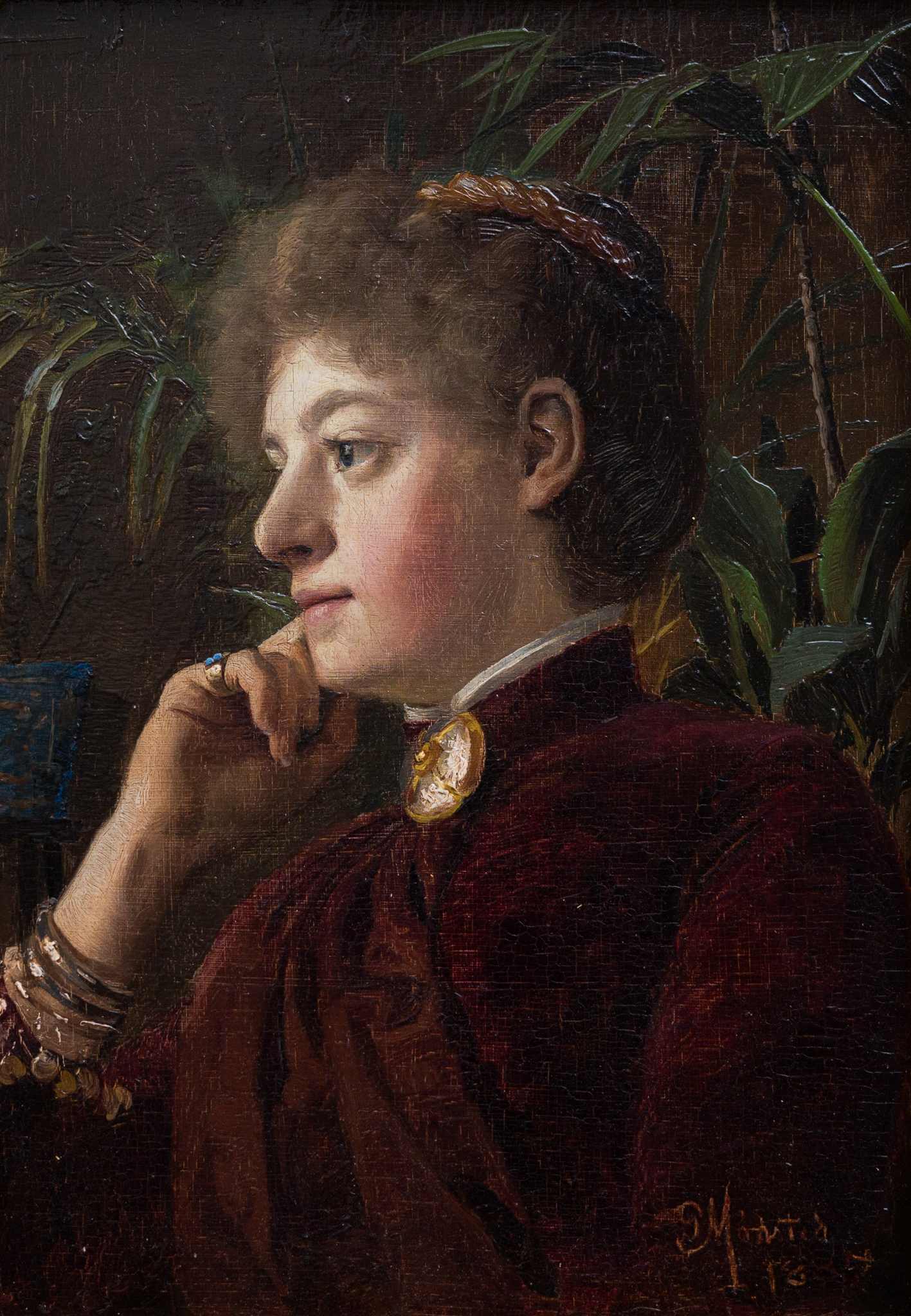
Portrait of a Girl, 1887

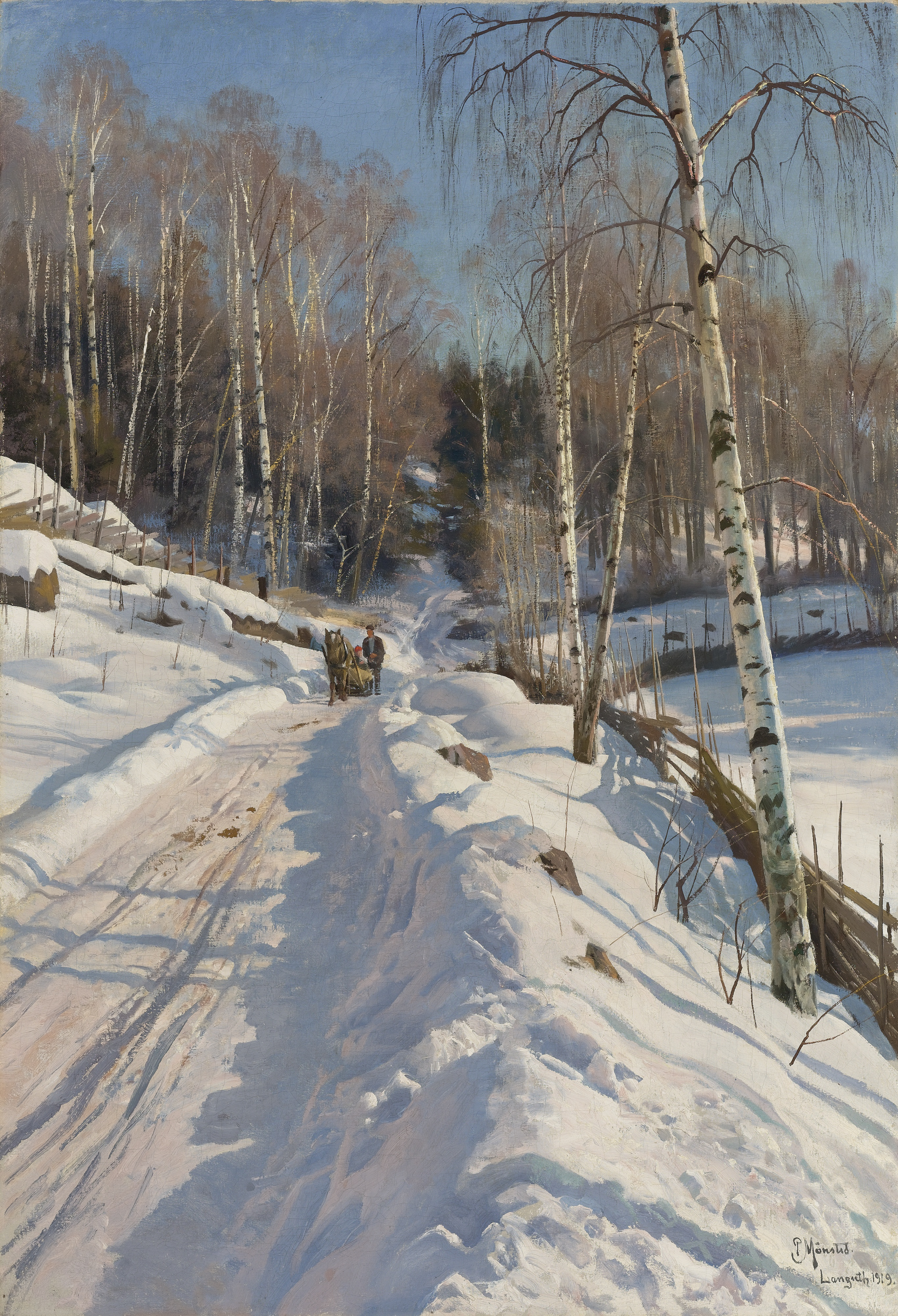
Sleigh Ride on a Sunny Winter Day

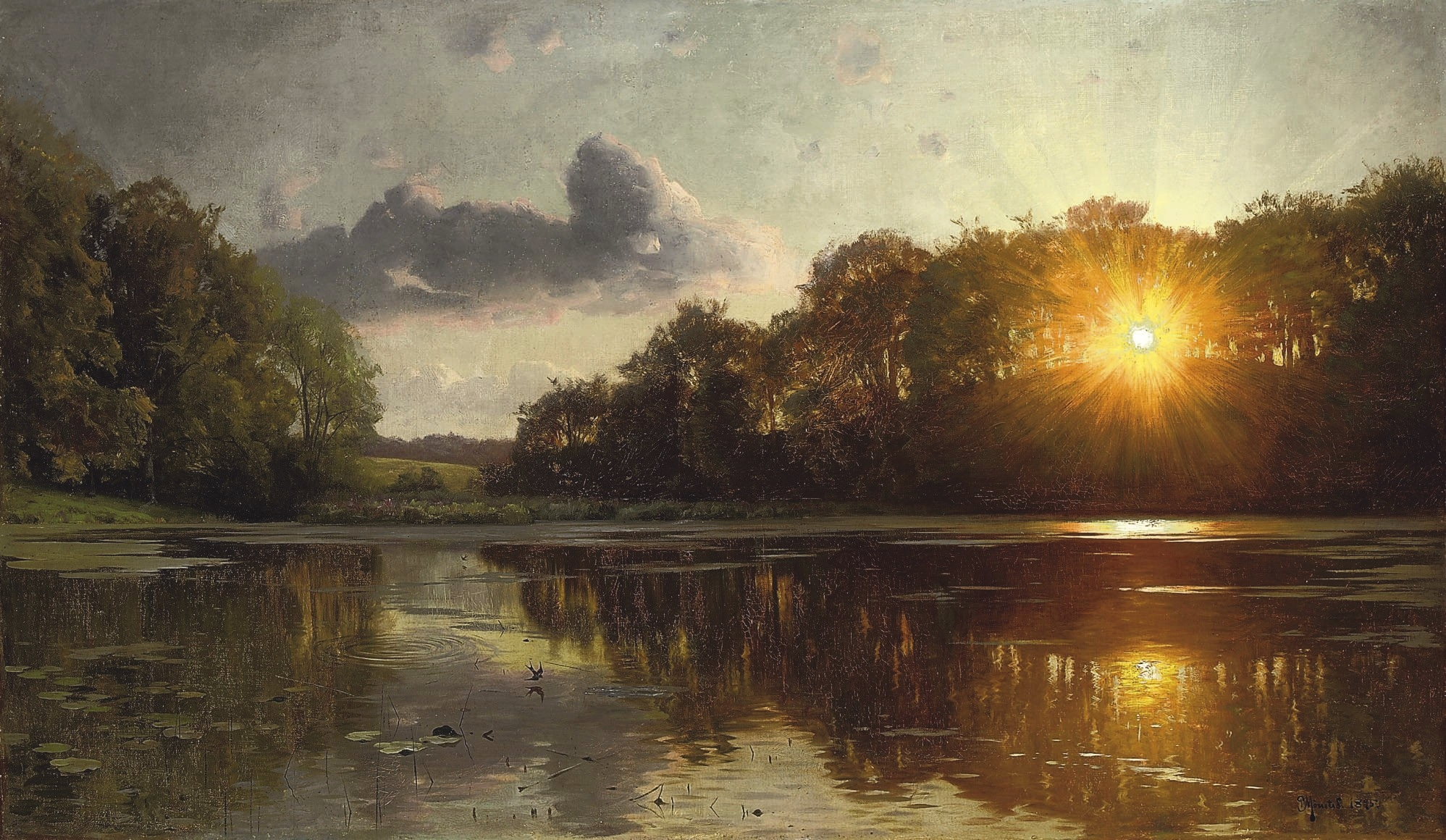
Sunset Over a Forest Lake

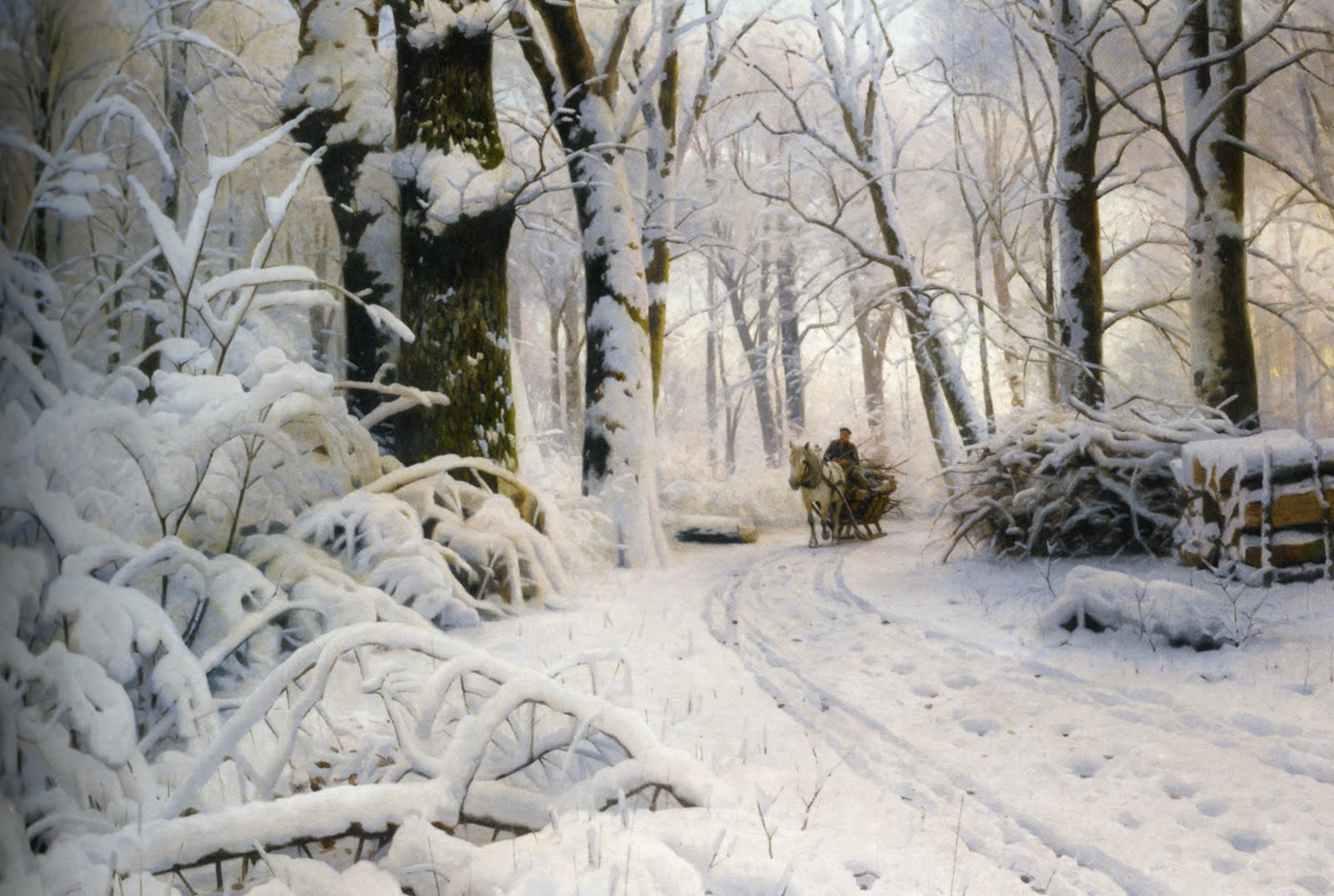
Wood in Snow

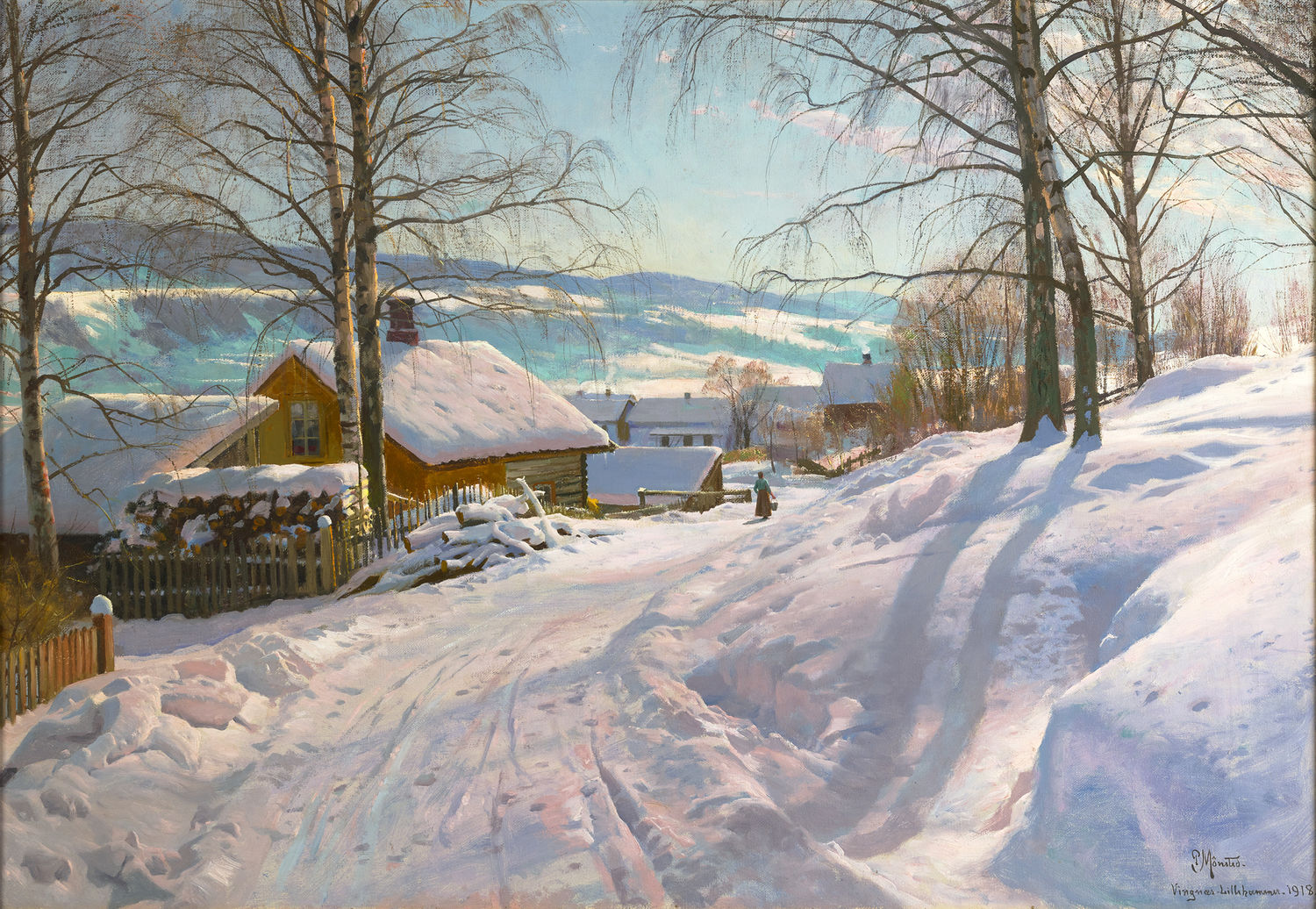
Vingnas, Lillehammer, 1918

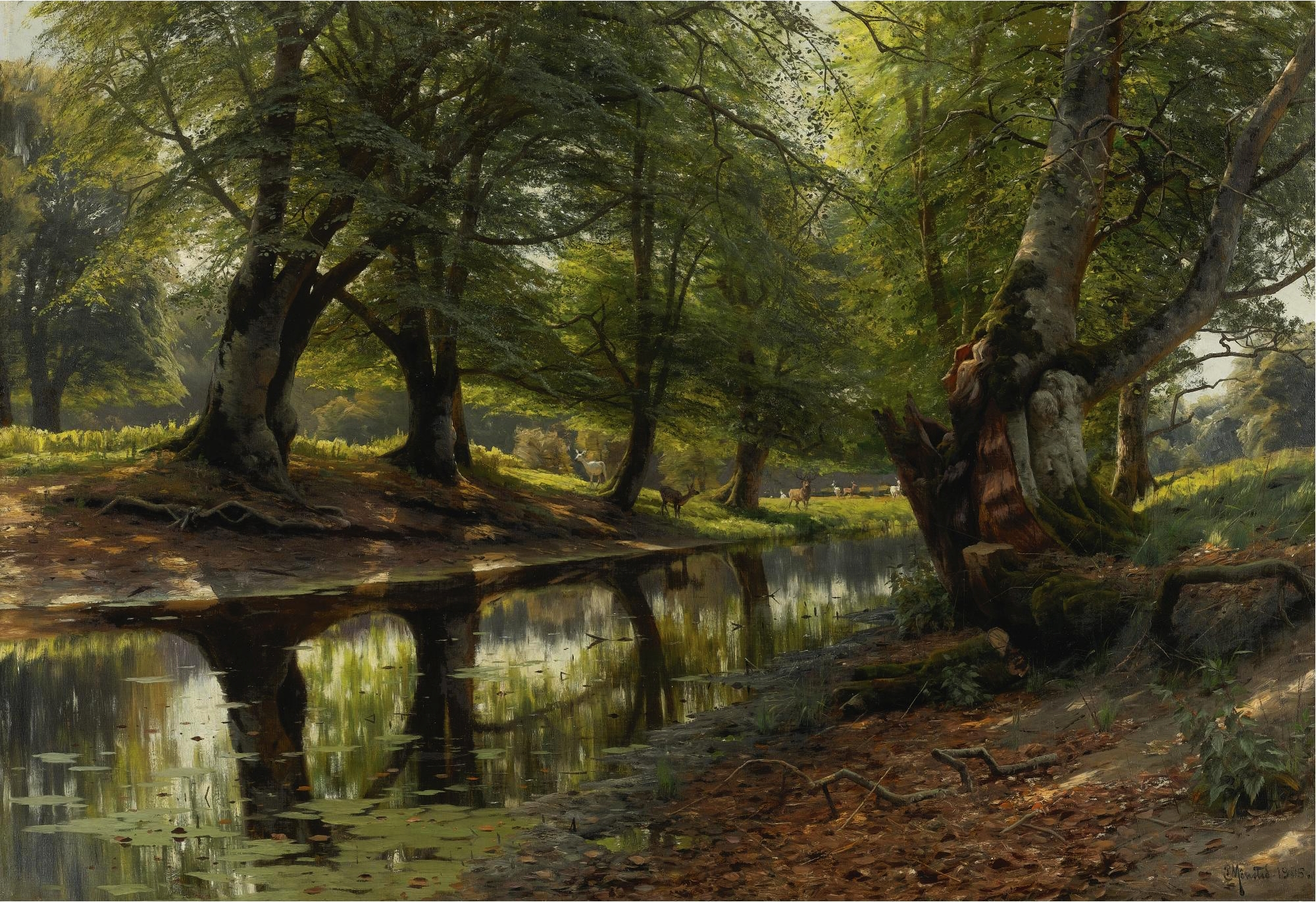
A Stream and a Deer

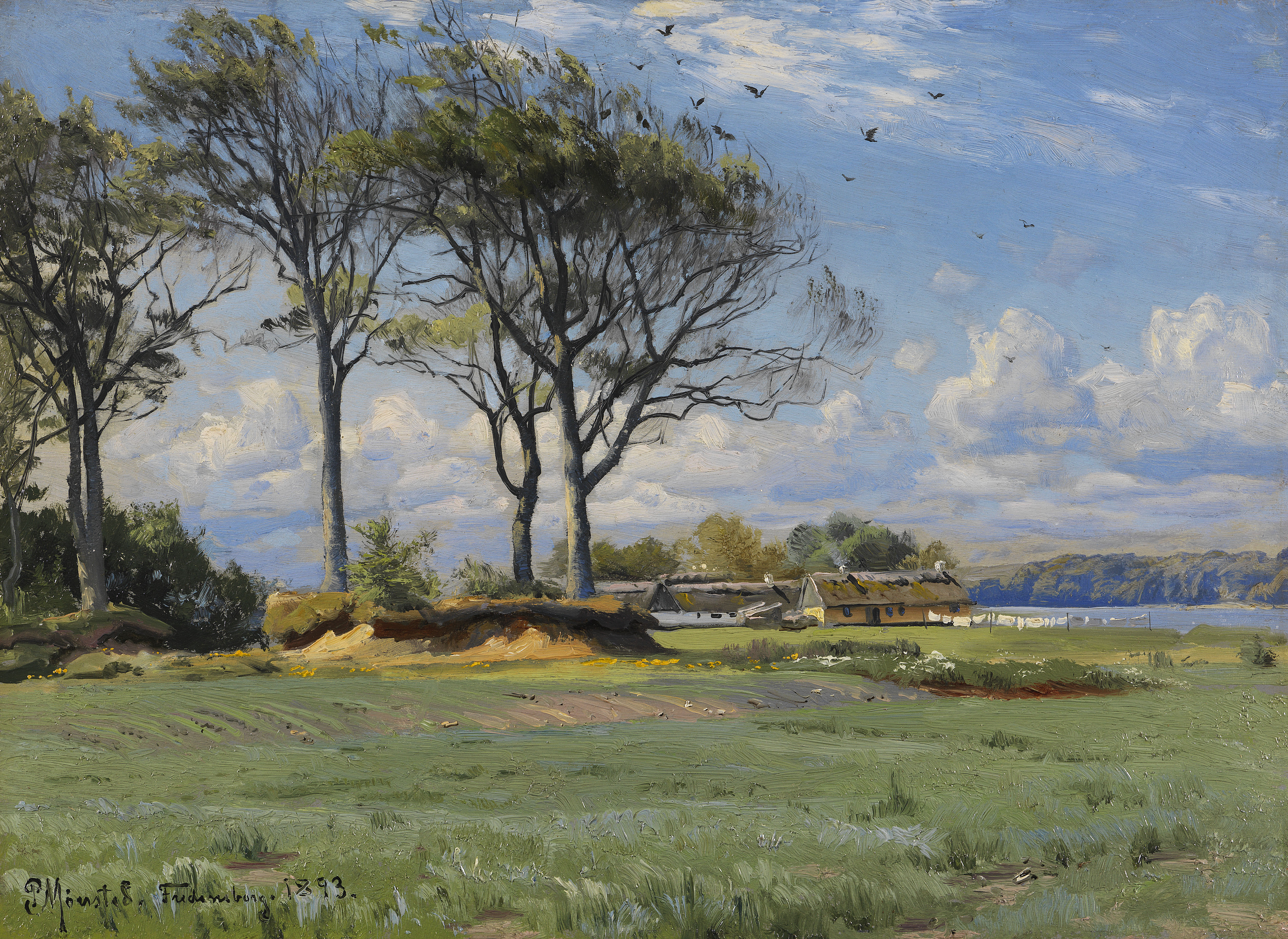
Reflections of Spring

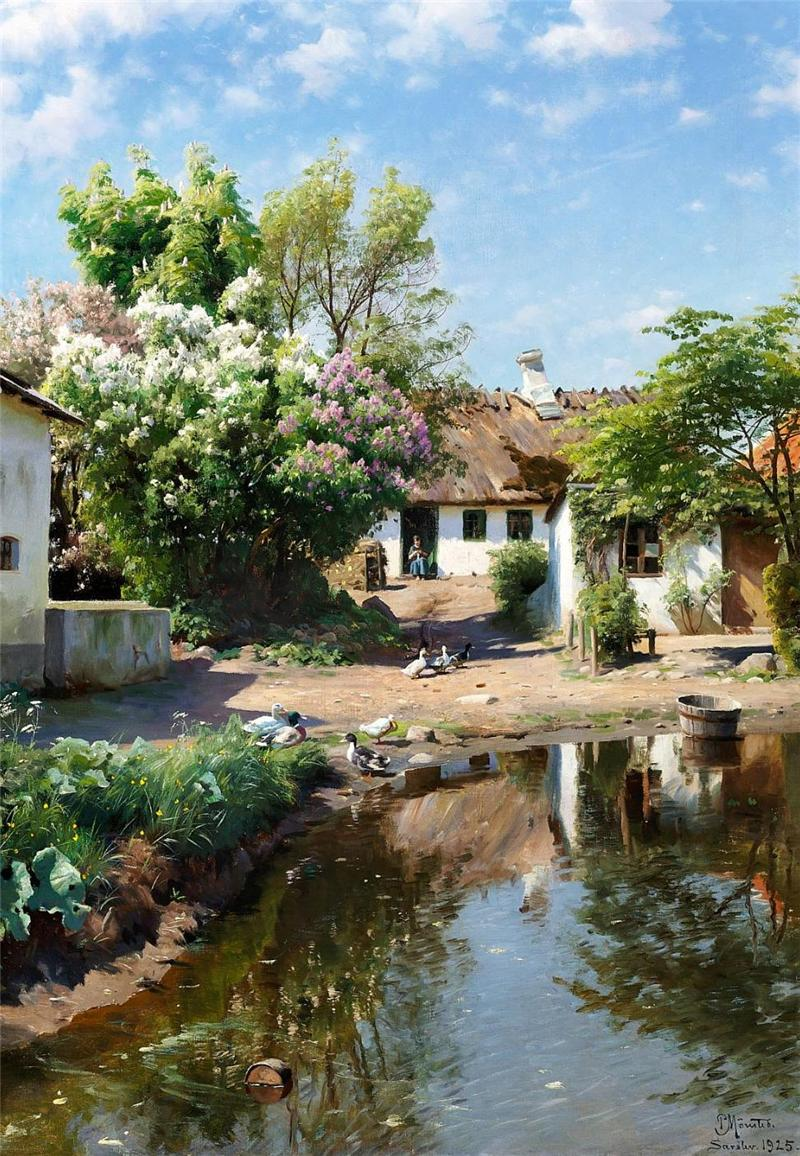
Rural Landscape

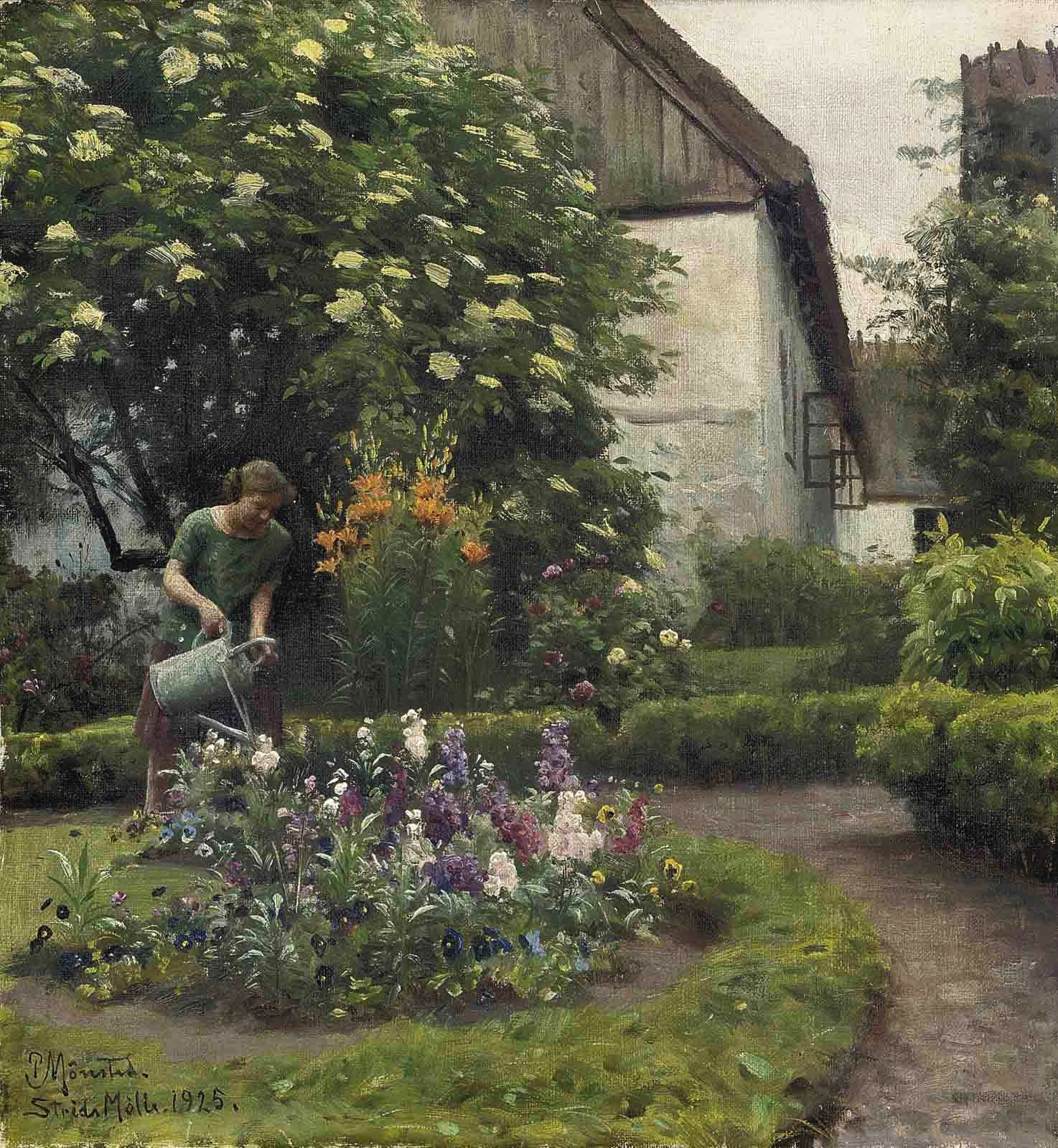
Watering the Garden

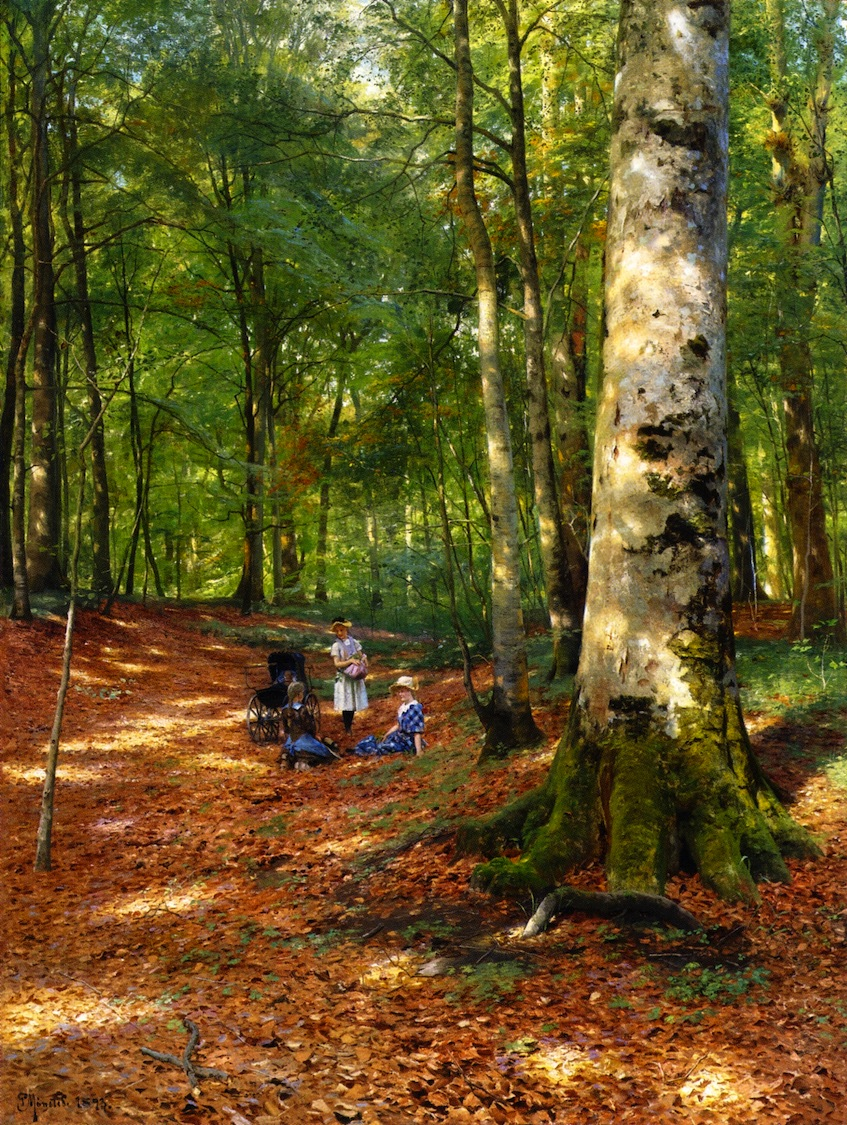
The Woodland Glade

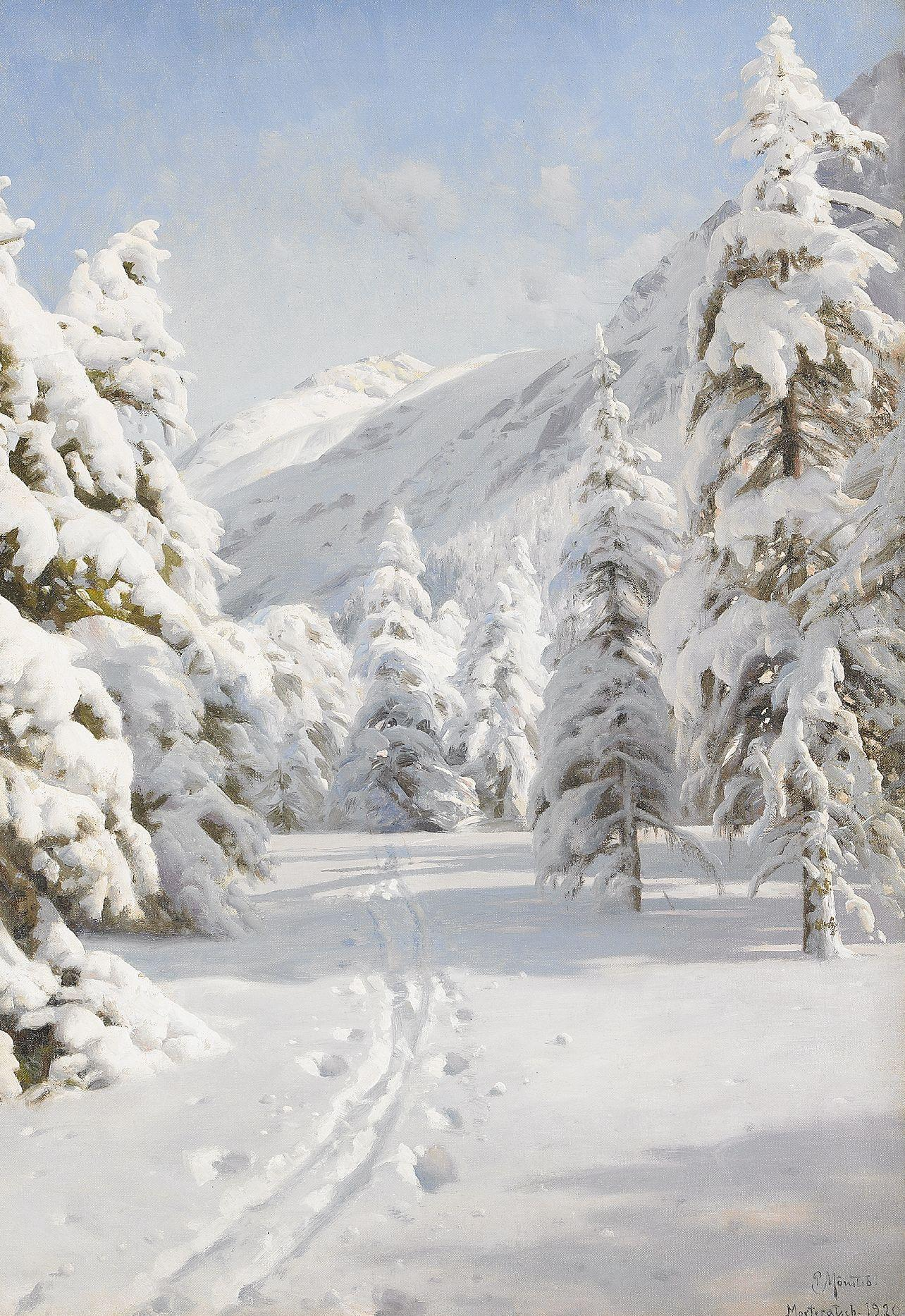
Winter Landscape

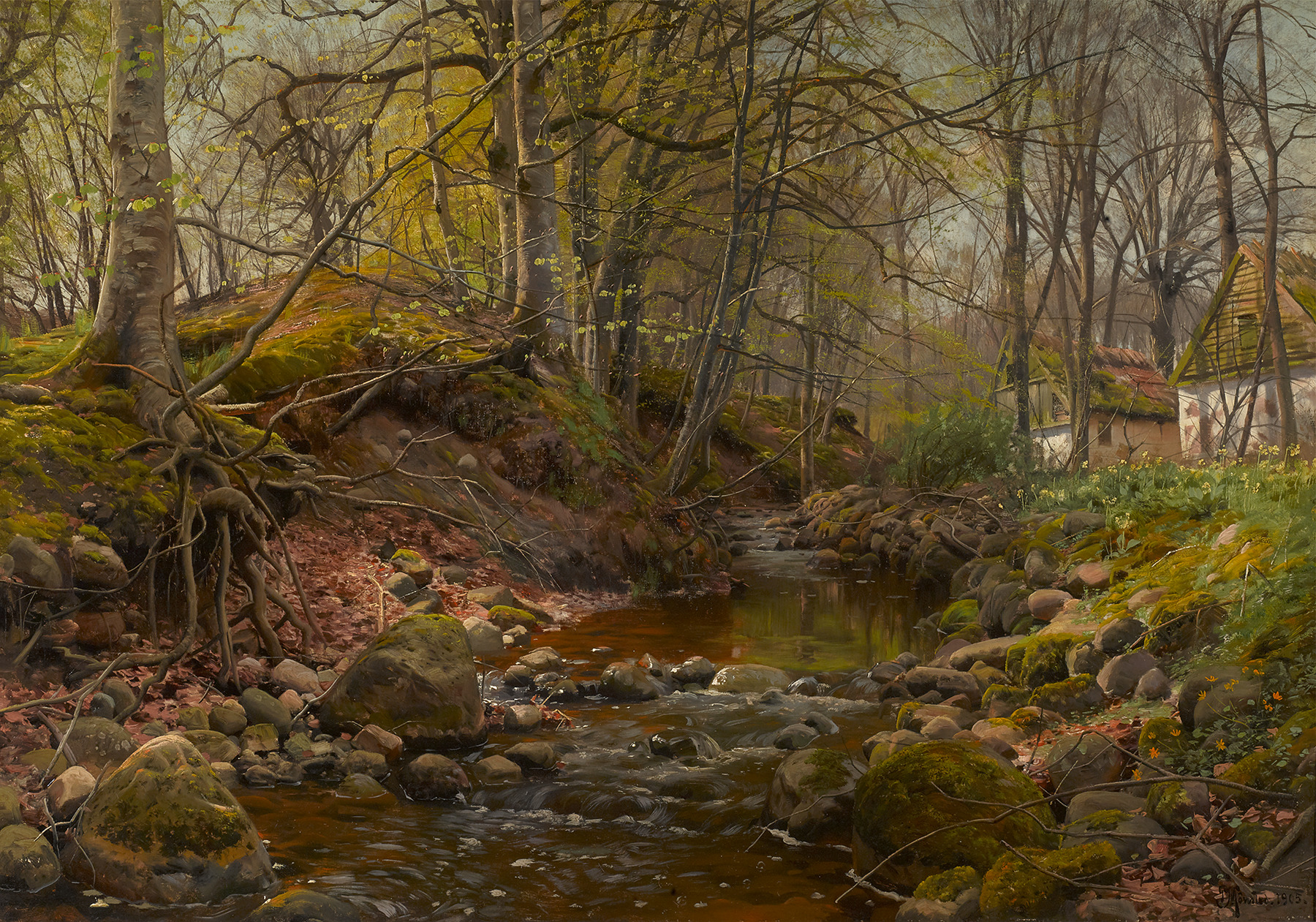
A Forest Stream

== See also ==
- Skagen painters
