= Lake Stubbe =

Lake in Syddjurs municipality, Denmark

- Stubbe Sø (Danish)
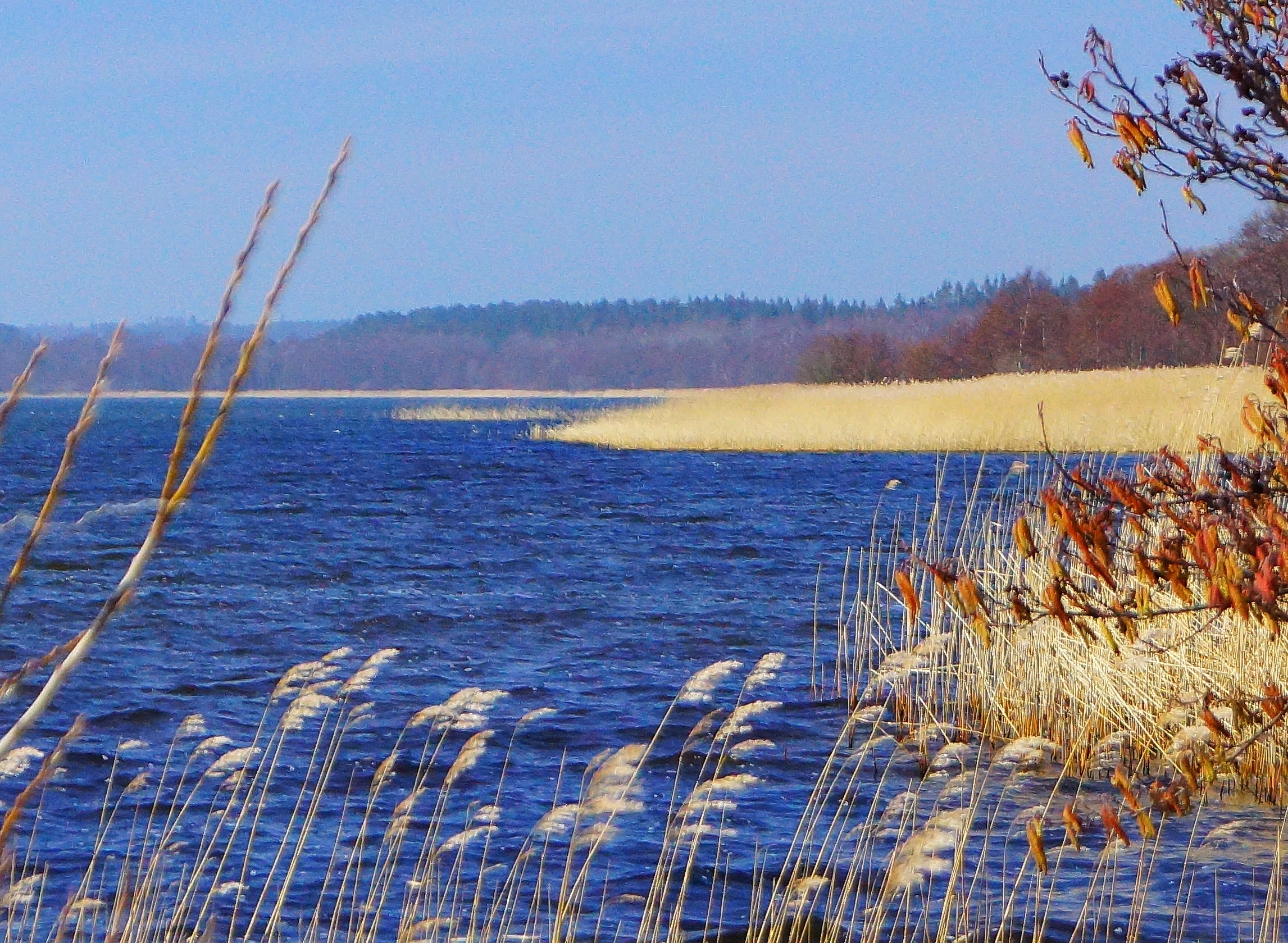
- Lake Stubbe seen from The Ornithological Society's north-eastern shore

- Lake Stubbe in Denmark, Northern Europe
- Location: Denmark
- Coordinates: 56°15′25″N 10°41′25″E
- Primary inflows: Øksenmølle- Ulstrup- and Gravlev streams
- Primary outflows: Mølleåen/Millstream
- Catchment area: l
- Surface area: 376 ha (930 acres)
- Average depth: 2.9 m (9 ft 6 in)
- Max. depth: 6 m (20 ft)
- Water volume: 11 million cubic metres (8,900 acre⋅ft)

Lake Stubbe (Stubbe Sø, in Danish) is a nature conservation area, and a former fjord, which in the Stone Age entered the sea, Kattegat, at the entrance to the Baltic Sea between Denmark and Sweden in Northern Europe. The lake is the largest lake in Djursland and is located about 6 km north of Ebeltoft.

150 years ago the lake was surrounded by moor land as the original oak forest had been depleted due to human intervention. To prevent sand drift the area was afforested, and 62 square kilometers of forest surrounds the lake today, consisting primarily of Norwegian fir and spruce, with some alder in low-lying areas.

Otters, which are rare in Denmark, live by the lake, just as the lake is a resting and foraging grounds for migrating birds to and from the rest of Scandinavia. Several large species of birds of prey can be seen by the lake.

In 1963 Lake Stubbe and adjacent woodland (381 ha) was reserved as protected in order preserve the landscape. Lake Stubbe is also an EU-habitat area, just as the area is part of Mols Bjerge National Park established in 2009.

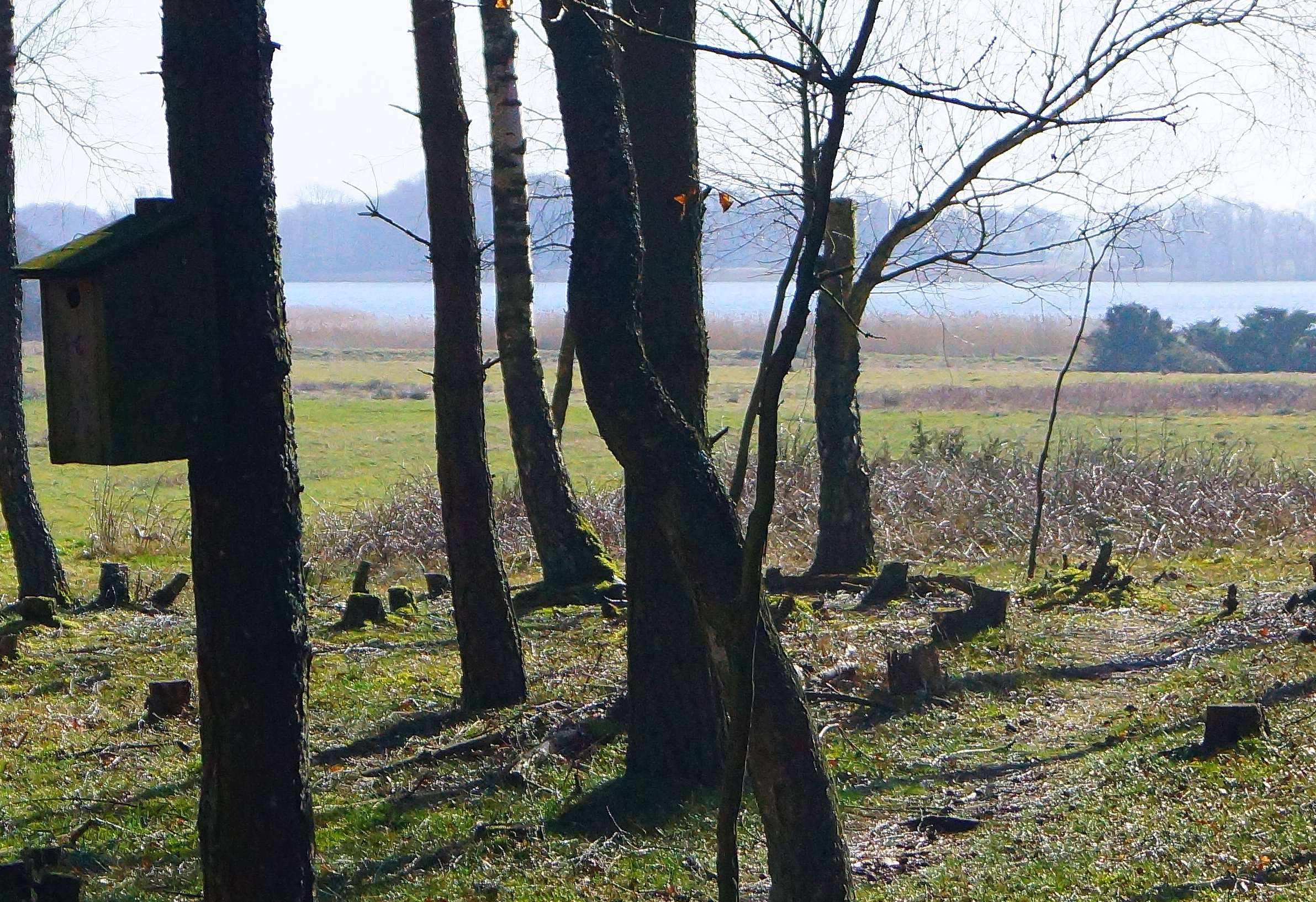
Publicly accessible Ornithological Society land on the North shore

== Access ==
Public access to the lake is hampered by a wall of reed surrounding most of the lake. There is a 2 km unpaved public road close to the southern shore through woodland. This road is a suitable starting point for walks including mushroom picking in the woods in late summer and autumn. On the North-eastern shore of Lake Stubbe the Danish Ornithological Society has built a public bird watching tower, that can be reached by foot via a former railroad track passing the lakes eastern side leading to the town of Ebeltoft 5 km south of the lake. The Society also owns a bird sanctuary on the north side of the lake. Here public access is possible by foot to a part of the lake where there are openings in the reed belt along the shore.

== Biomanipulation ==
Streams leading to the lake are spawning grounds for sea trout. Lake fishlife includes perch, pike, bream, roach and walleye.

Around year 2000 a seemingly failed state-initiated biomanipulation project was carried out, in an attempt to make the lake water clearer. In summer Lake Stubbe can be green with algae. Part of the project was to fish up in the order of 1000 tons of roach and bream with nets, as these fish eat daphnia and copepods, small crustaceans, that devour the algae that make the water green. The idea was, that with less algae, the water would become clearer. Algae blossom is an indication of nutrient rich water. A large number of pike fry was also released, as pike eat bream and roach. Ditches with nutrient rich water from a summer cottage area north of the lake was also cut off.

In 2014 + 10 years after the biomanipulation effort, the lake still becomes green with algae in summer, indicating the attempt was in vain. The tipping balance between a clear lake type and a murky green lake type can be part of a natural cycle in lakes over years, alternating between the two separate biological states. A biologist has suggested that a missing factor might have been to raise the level of the lake in spring by some decimeters, thus flooding low-lying land, in order to increase the amount of suitable breeding grounds for pike, that eat bream and roach. This would have involved flooding privately owned land.
