= Grenaa Beach =

Beach in Denmark

- Beach
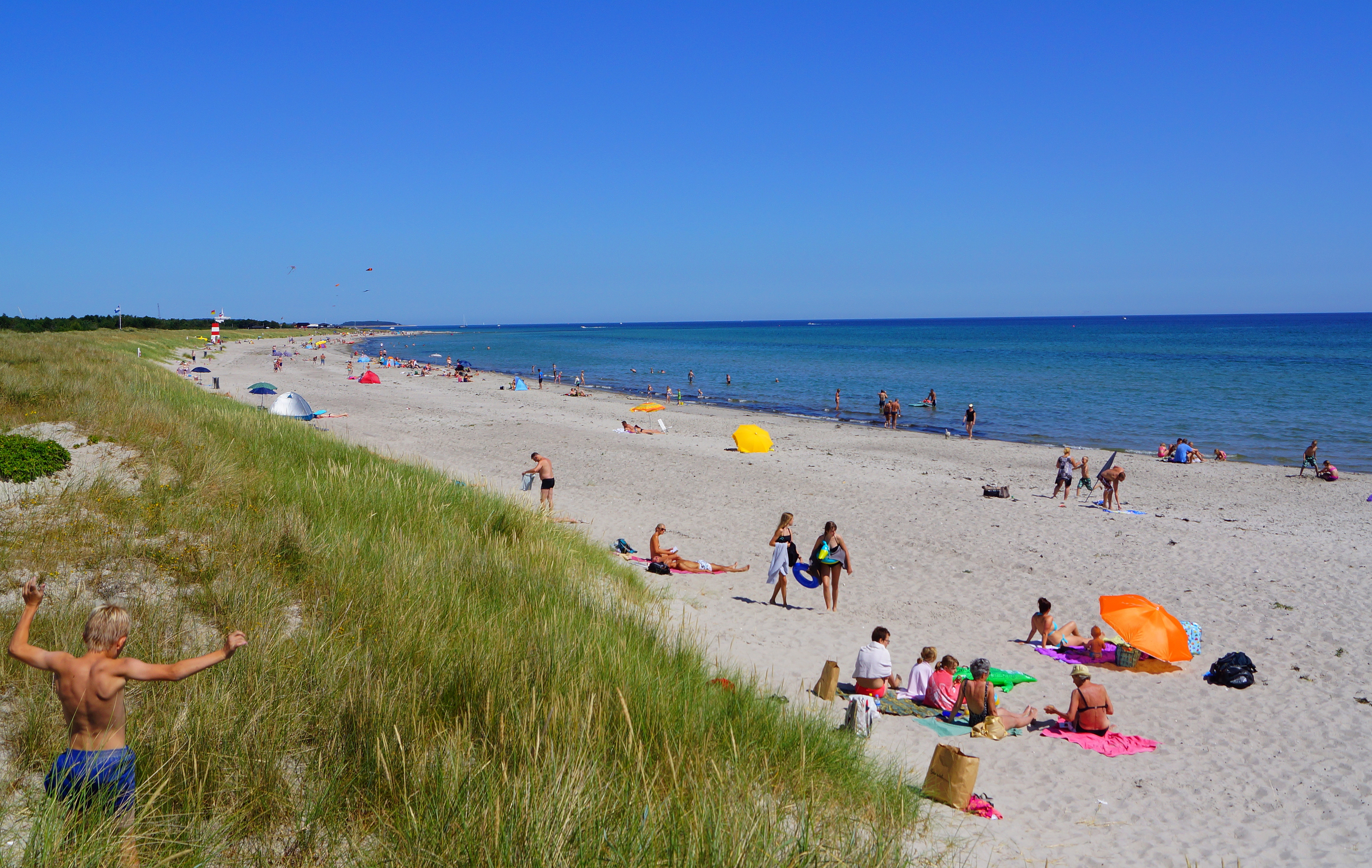

- Coordinates: 56°22′35″N 10°54′52″E
- Location: Norddjurs, Denmark

Sandy Grenaa Beach (Danish: Grenaa Strand) on Djursland's east coast – in eastern Jutland, Denmark, at the entrance to the Baltic Sea – starts at Grenaa Marina, and runs south for 6 km. The last 1.5 km are seldom visited, ending at the cape of Havknude. Here the beach turns into a stony shoreline, that continues 30 km down the east coast of the peninsula of Djursland, facing the Kattegat between Denmark and Sweden. This coastline south of Grenaa Beach is renowned amongst anglers.

== Recreational ==
There are a lot of summer rentals close to the town of Grenaa and Grenaa Beach, and the beach is a recreational asset for these houses and for the inhabitants of Grenaa. Facing east away from the predominant westerly winds, and protected from the Atlantic, increases the amount of good beech days. The summer temperature in Denmark is seldom unpleasantly hot. With a band of dunes the beach has sheltered spots along the coast if its to chilly to stay on the open beach. Apart from Danes, Grenaa beach is mostly visited by Swedes, Norwegians and Germans. It is not overcrowded, as Denmark, as well as the rest of Scandinavia, is significantly less populated than the neighbouring central European countries. The uncrowded nature is also due to many other beach-alternatives on Denmark's long coastline. On the peninsula, Djursland, where Grenaa Beach lies, there are 21 other sandy beaches. In 2006 Grenaa Beach was nominated as one of the 2 best beaches in Denmark, by The Danish Tourist Board. Many Danes have a good working knowledge of English. Katholm Strandvej runs parallel to the major part of the beach, with free parking and access to the shoreline without long walks. This, and a coastline facing east, with no tide or current to speak of under normal summer conditions, makes the beach child friendly and safe. The water is tested and certified as clean and non-polluted, under the Danish "Blue Flag" system.

== Gallery ==
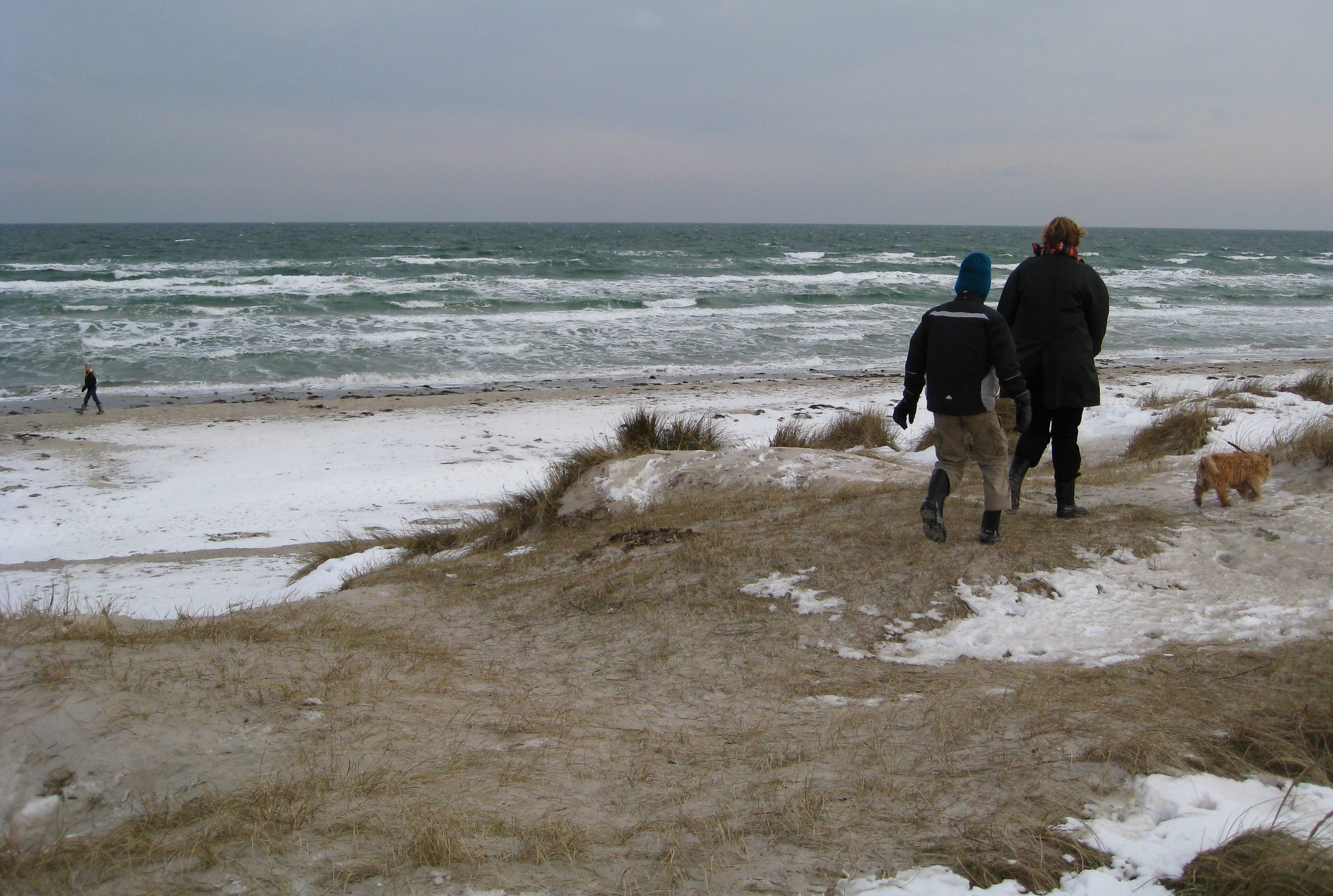
Off season: All of the Danish coastline is publicly accessible by law

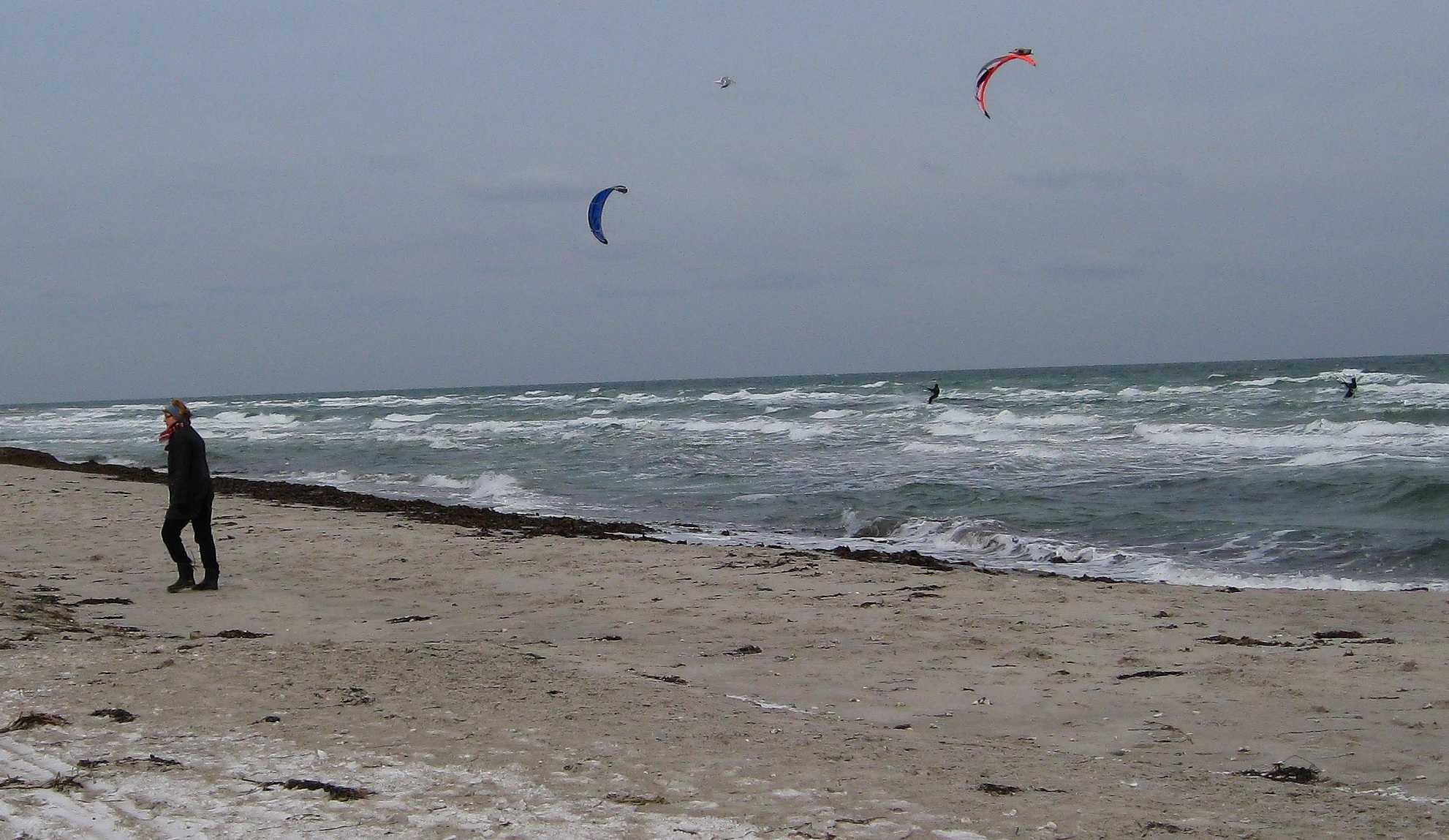
Off Season: Frosty windsurfing

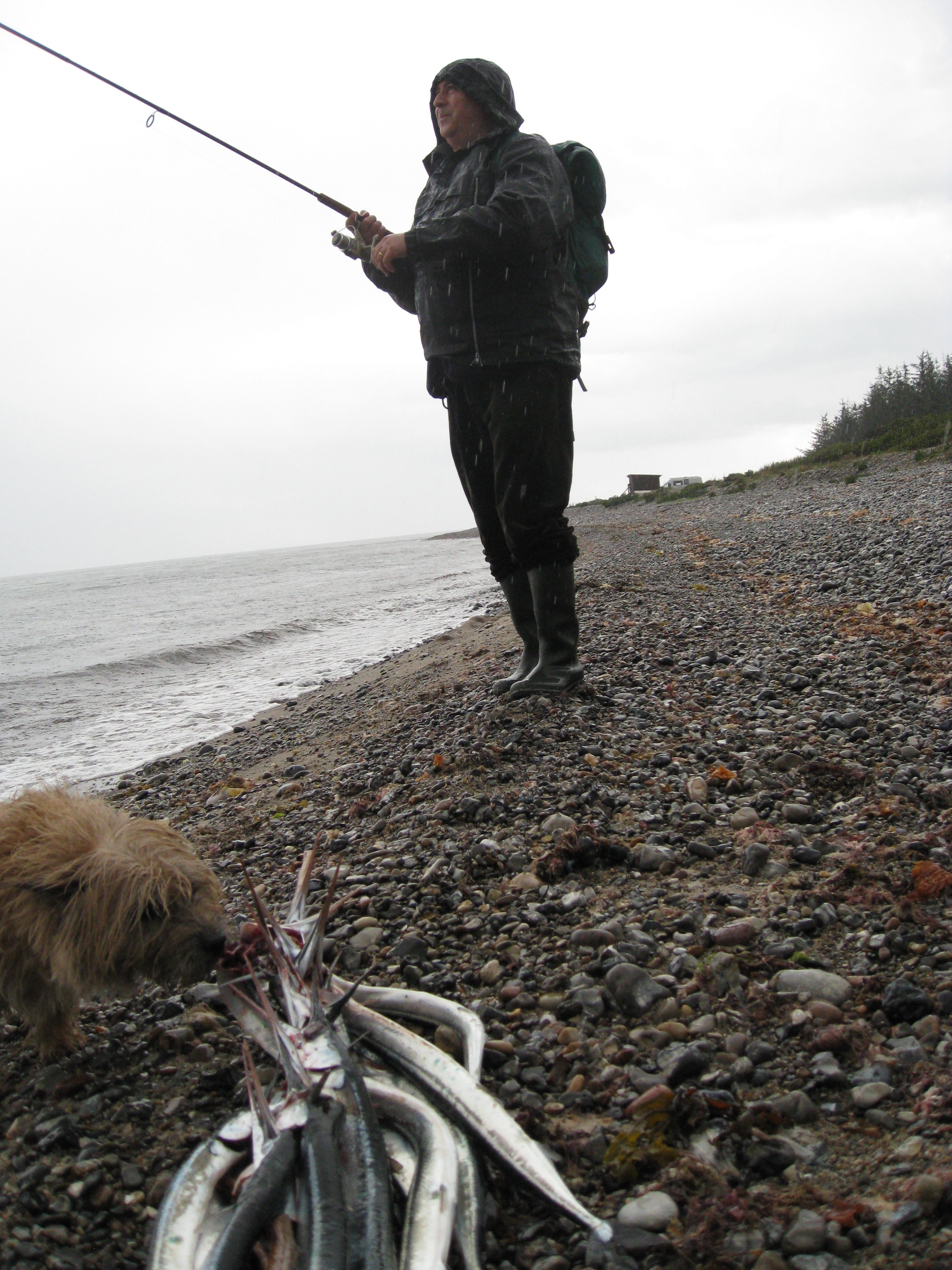
South of Grenå Beach the coast is known for angling

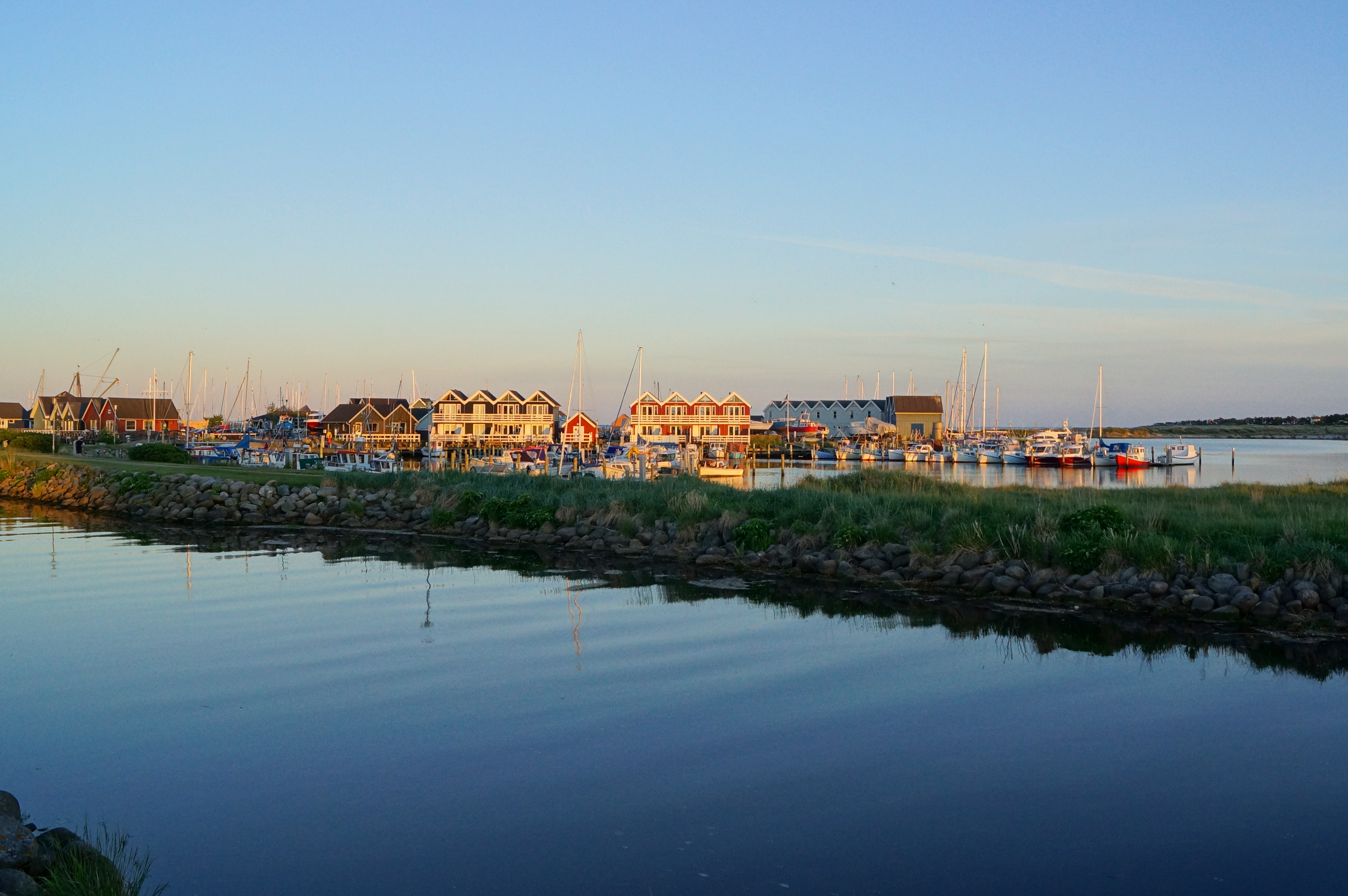
Grenaa Beach starts at the Marina of Grenaa

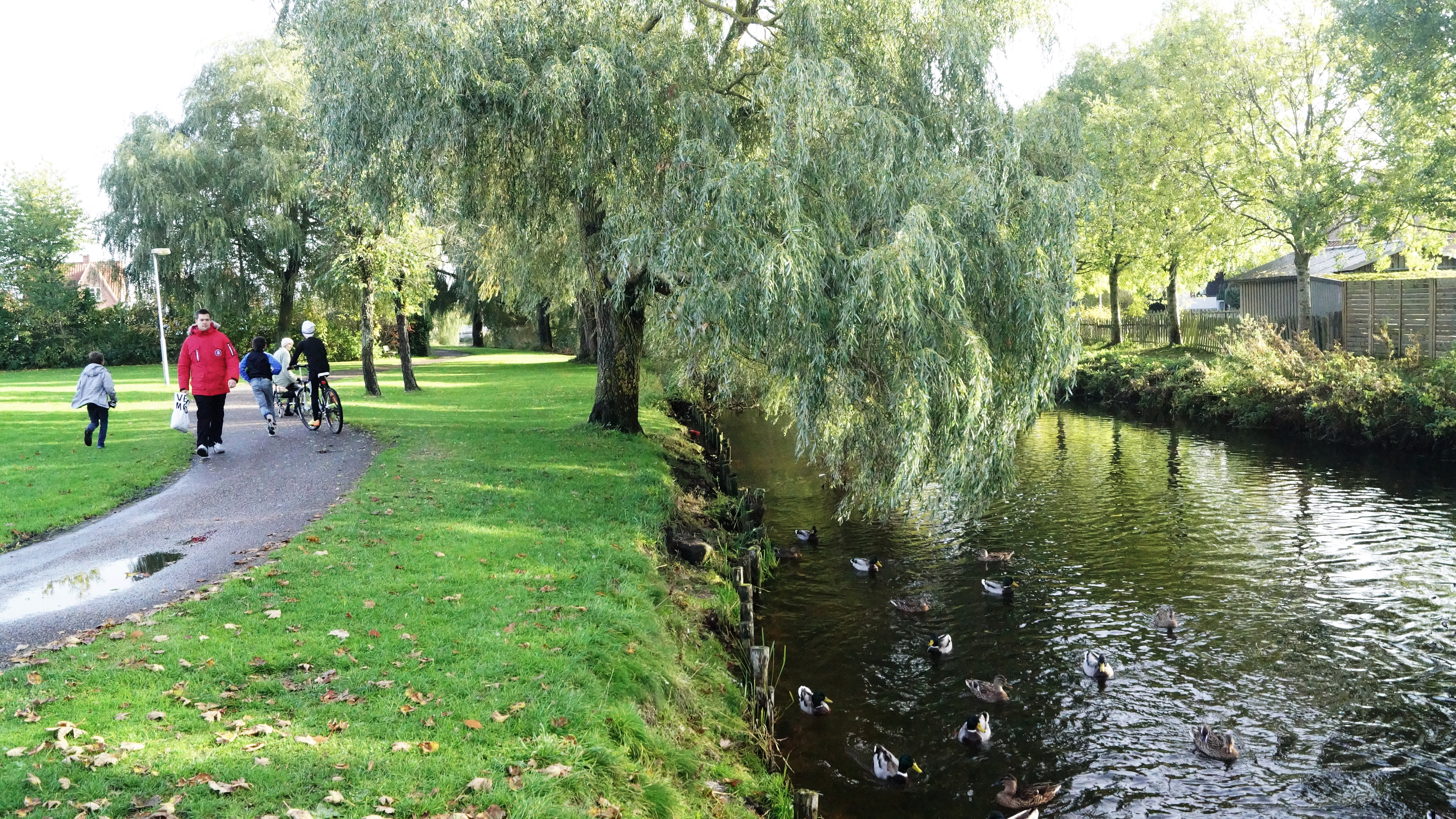
A river runs through Grenaa joining the sea at the Marina

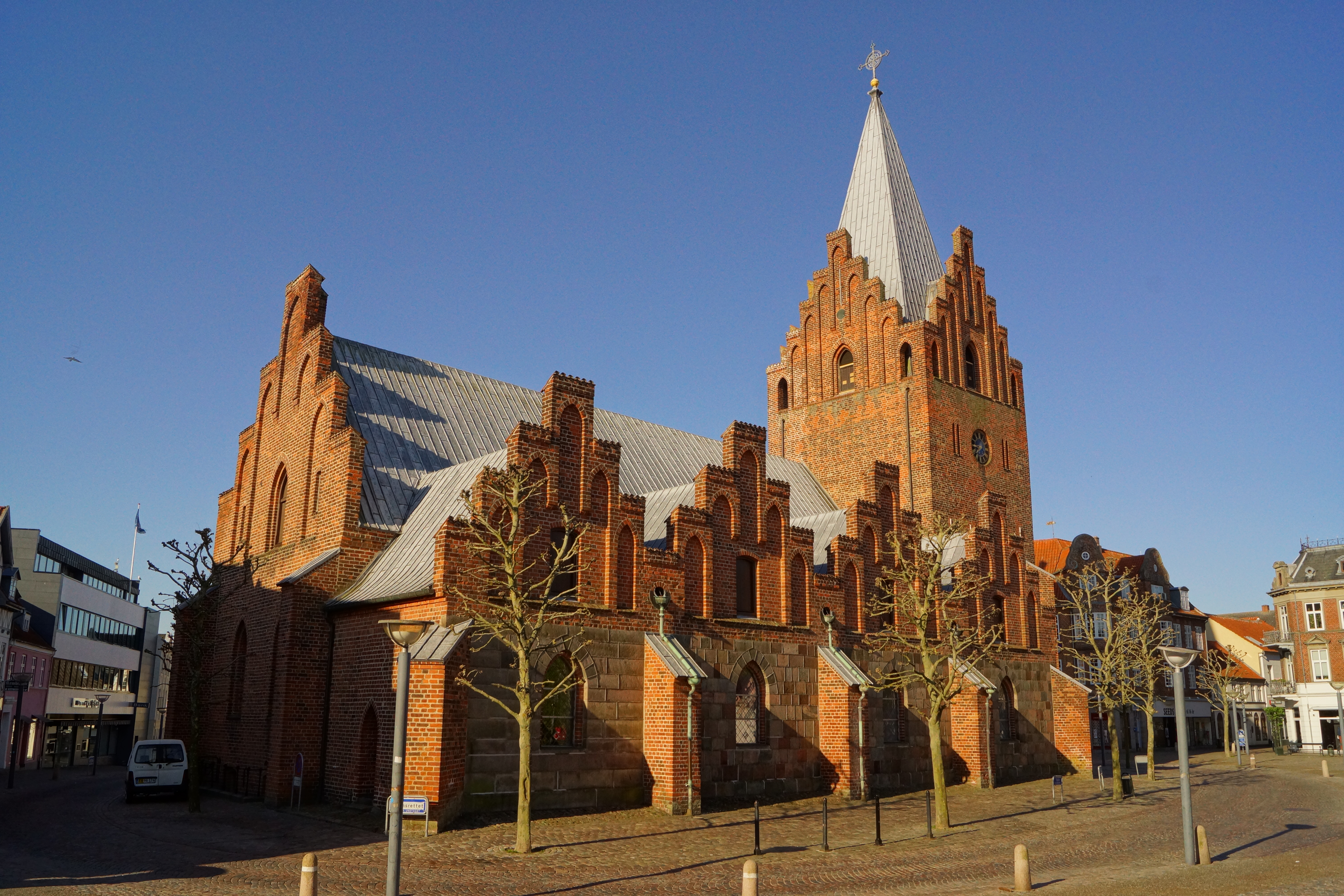
Grenaa Church
