= Coastline of Djursland =

260 kilometre-long coastline of Djursland in Denmark

Djursland’s Coastline, Denmark
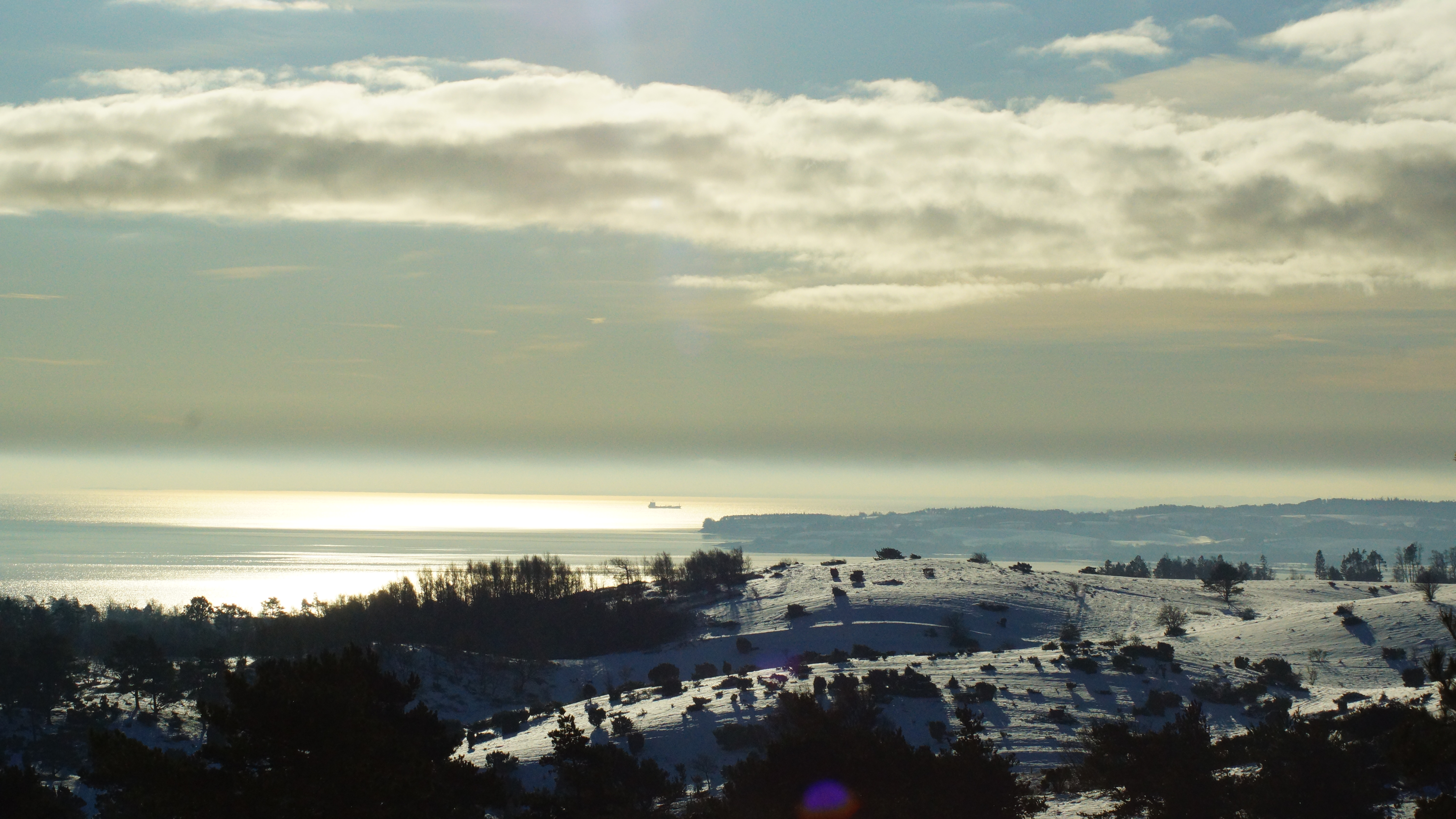
- Hills lead down to bays on Djursland’s southern coastline

- Location within Denmark
- Location: Denmark, Southern Scandinavia, Europe
- Coordinates: 56°21′26.88″N 10°37′45.15″E

The coastline of Djursland in Denmark is 260 kilometers long as measured from the ferry berth in Voer in the middle of Randers Fjord ending at Avlsgård in Aarhus Bay to the south. There are 18 sandy beaches for swimming along the coastline according to the folder, Kystkort Djursland (Coastal Map Djursland) published by the peninsula's two municipalities, Norddjurs and Syddjurs. These beaches cover 15 – 20%. of the total coastline. The remaining 200 plus kilometres are mostly unspoiled coastal nature.

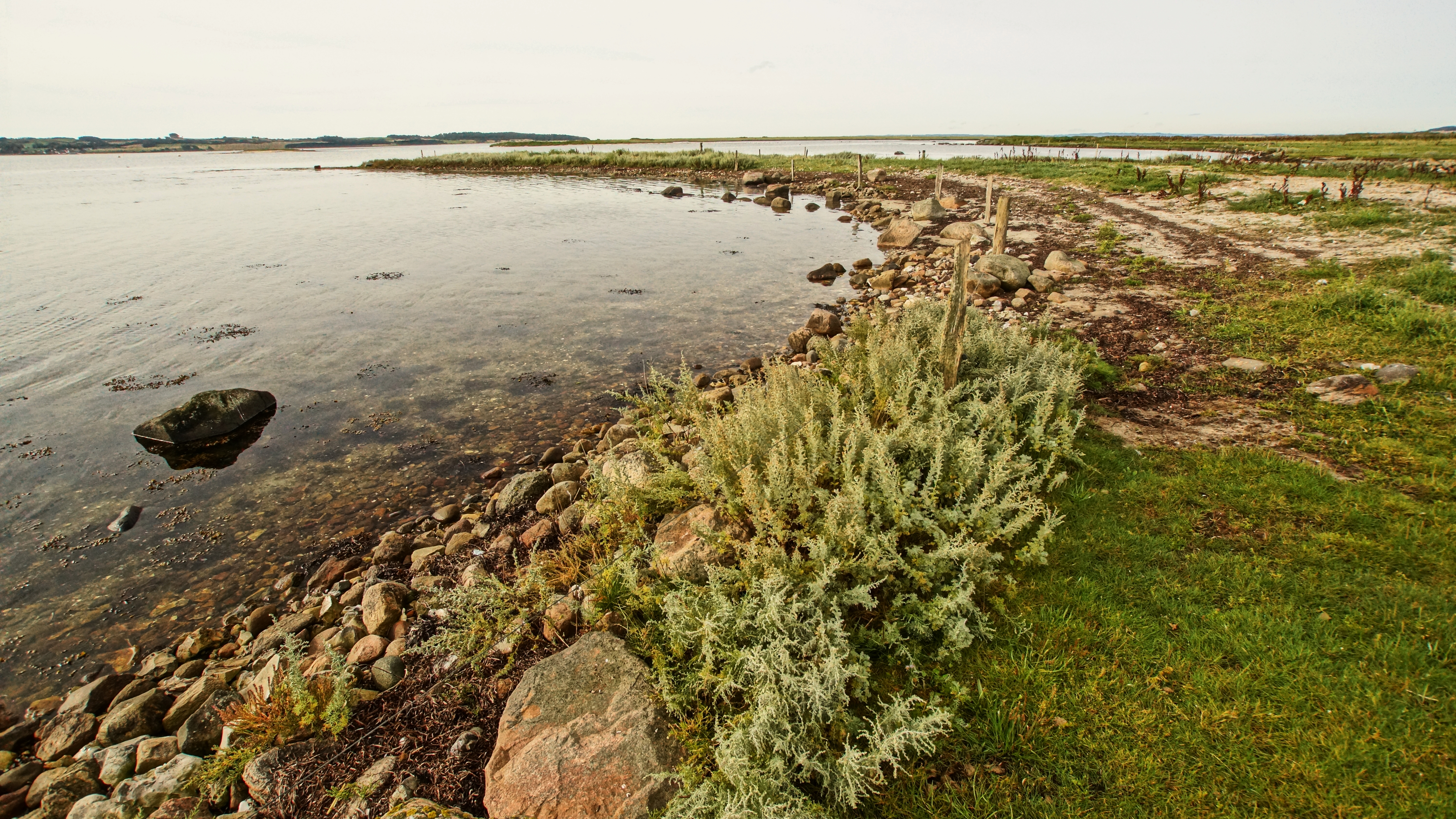
The shoreline at Strands Gunger in Begtrup Bay with the wave and current made phenomena, krumodde ( spit)

The shorelines of the peninsula face in all directions and are exposed to winds from all directions. This together with the varied geology of the Djursland peninsula with hills to the south and more flat land to the north, contributes to a variety in coastal nature within the limited area of Djursland. The peninsula is on average 35 kilometers long measured on the vertical axis, and about 40 kilometers on the horizontal axis, Djursland protrudes into the Kattegat Sea between Jutland in Denmark, and Sweden on the other side of the Kattegat sea. The Kattegat Sea is the gateway to the Baltic Sea.

Djursland's coastline is located in a temperate coastal climate with an average summer temperature in July of 20 degrees Celsius in the day, and 12 degrees at night, and an average winter temperature in January of 5 degrees in the day and 1 degree at night (1961 – 1990) The sea temperature around Djursland is on average 17 degrees Celsius in July and August (higher close to land) and 2 degrees Celsius in February. The salinity varies somewhere between Atlantic salinity of 35 parts per thousand, and Baltic salinity of 10 – 15 parts per thousand. The variation is due to wind and tidal driven fluctuations in the proportion of Atlantic and Baltic water around Djursland. The daily tidal difference is under 30 centimeters. When storms or heavy winds occasionally drive the water in and out of The Kattegat Sea between The Baltic and the North Sea, the tidal difference can reach over one meter.

The coastline of Djursland can be divided into 4 regions: the brackish shoreline of Randers Fjord, the shallow waters of the north coast, the exposed stony east coast, and the sheltered bays to the south.

== Brackish North Western Coast ==
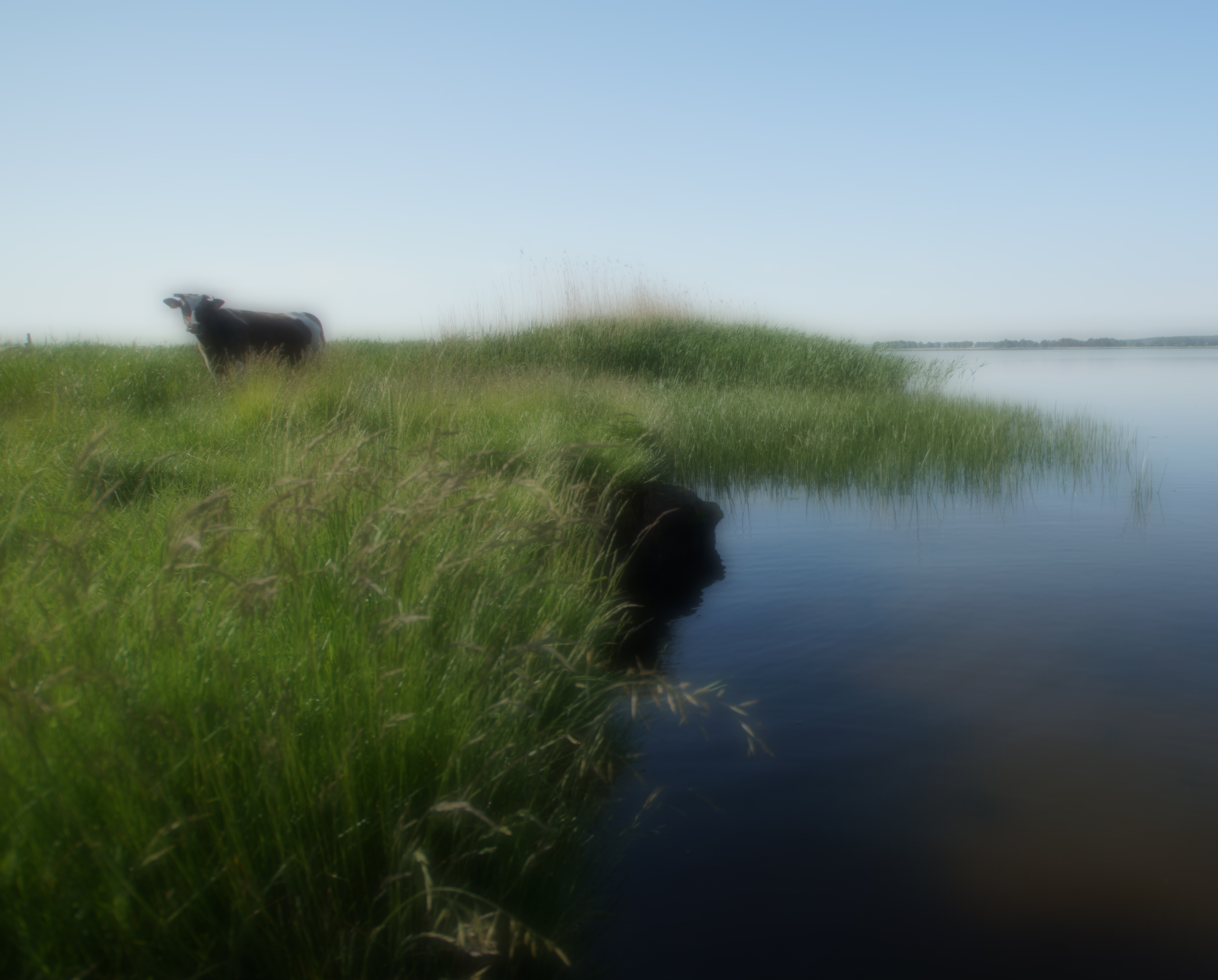
Some places in Randers Fjord medows and swamps go directly over into the fjord without any beaches

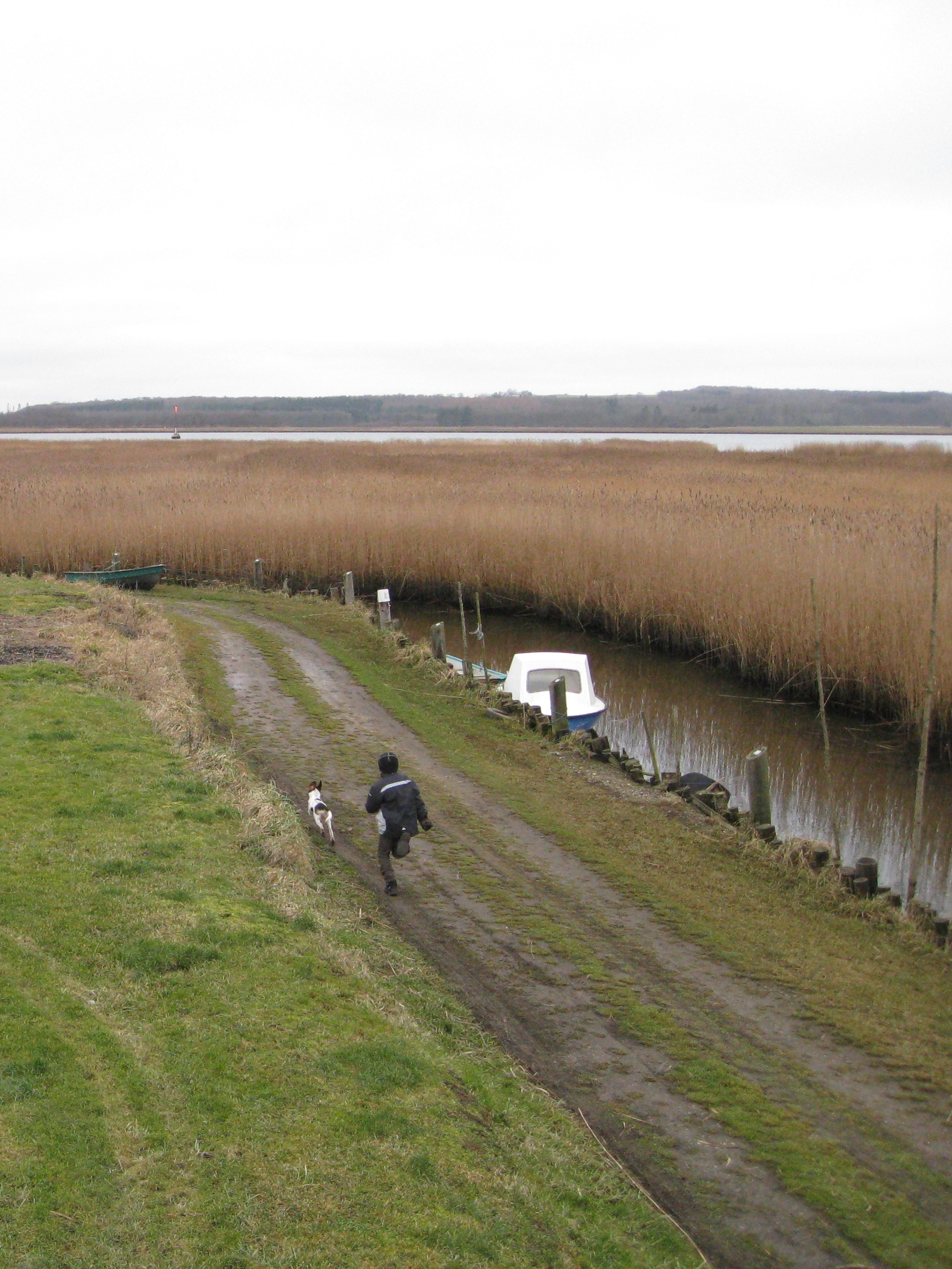
In many places access to Randers Fjord is inhibited by reed banks

To the northwest the Djursland peninsula borders Randers Fjord. This narrow, 30 kilometre long wetland, cuts into mainland Jutland. The fjord is the outlet for Denmark's longest river, Gudenå. The fresh water from the river mixes with salt water in the fjord. Along the fjord meadows and swamps often go directly into the fjord without any beaches. The bottom along the coastline consists of claylike silt, and one has to go quite far out to reach any significant depth in many places. These conditions are not favourable for beach life. In many places banks of reeds reach all the way into the fjord, making it impossible to walk along the coast. This lack of accessibility is characteristic for the north eastern borders of the Djursland peninsula in Randers Fjord.

There is no recreational potential to speak of for swimming and bathing in Randers Fjord, but there is potential for boating and fishing. The wetlands are also a habitat for wildlife. Sea trout and salmon migrate up the fjord to Gudenå and its tributaries. A local subspecies of herring spawn in the fjord. Each spring big schools of herring migrate into the fjord all the way to Randers Harbor 30 kilometres inland.

Even though there are mamy fish in the fjord, local knowledge is often required to catch the fish, and to find the places where one can get down to the shores free of reed banks, which are also good for fishing.

By Kanaløen (The Channel Island) there is a bulwark in connection with a dug out shipping channel. Here it gets deep right from the bulwark. This 2.5 kilometer stretch is a nationally and internationally known place for recreational angling for herring, mainly in spring. The place lies just south of the visitors' centre, Kyst og Fjordcentret, (The Coast and Fjord Centre) and next to a ferry berth and small marina by the village, Voer. In Voer there is a ferry crossing the fjord to Mellerup with the mini ferry Ragna taking 5 minutes to cross the fjord, with a capacity of 3 – 4 cars at a time. Just north of the Coast and Fjord Centre the coastline is accessible in waders. This is one of the good places in the fjord to catch sea trout according to the local anglers club, SMIFF.

== Shallow Northern Coast ==
The northern coastline of Djursland stretches from the mouth of Randers Fjord to Gjerrild Strand (Gjerrild Beach) in the north east corner of the peninsula. This north facing coastline is 40 kilometres long. After Gjerrild Beach the coast goes south and turns into the stony east facing coast of Djursland.

Djursland's north coast is characterized by shallow sandy beaches. In most places one has to wade quite far out to reach depths suitable for swimming. Closest to mainland Jutland at St. Sjørup and at Lystrup there is a semi permanent sand bar along the coast. This constitutes the actual beach for beach goers. By the shore there is hardly any beach. This is most clearly seen at St. Sjørup where the sandbar lies 400 metres out parallel to the coast. Furthest to the east at Gjerrild Beach it gets deep faster. Here there are also sand dunes along the beach. The shallow waters of the north coast warm up quickly in summer, and this contributes to their recreational value, including the child friendliness of these beaches. It is safe to bathe here, when one must wade out 30 metres or more in many places to reach a depth of 20 centimetres. Being a north facing shoreline onshore winds are uncommon (from the north) in this geographical region. So there are rarely big waves, contributing further to the recreational value of the northern coastline.

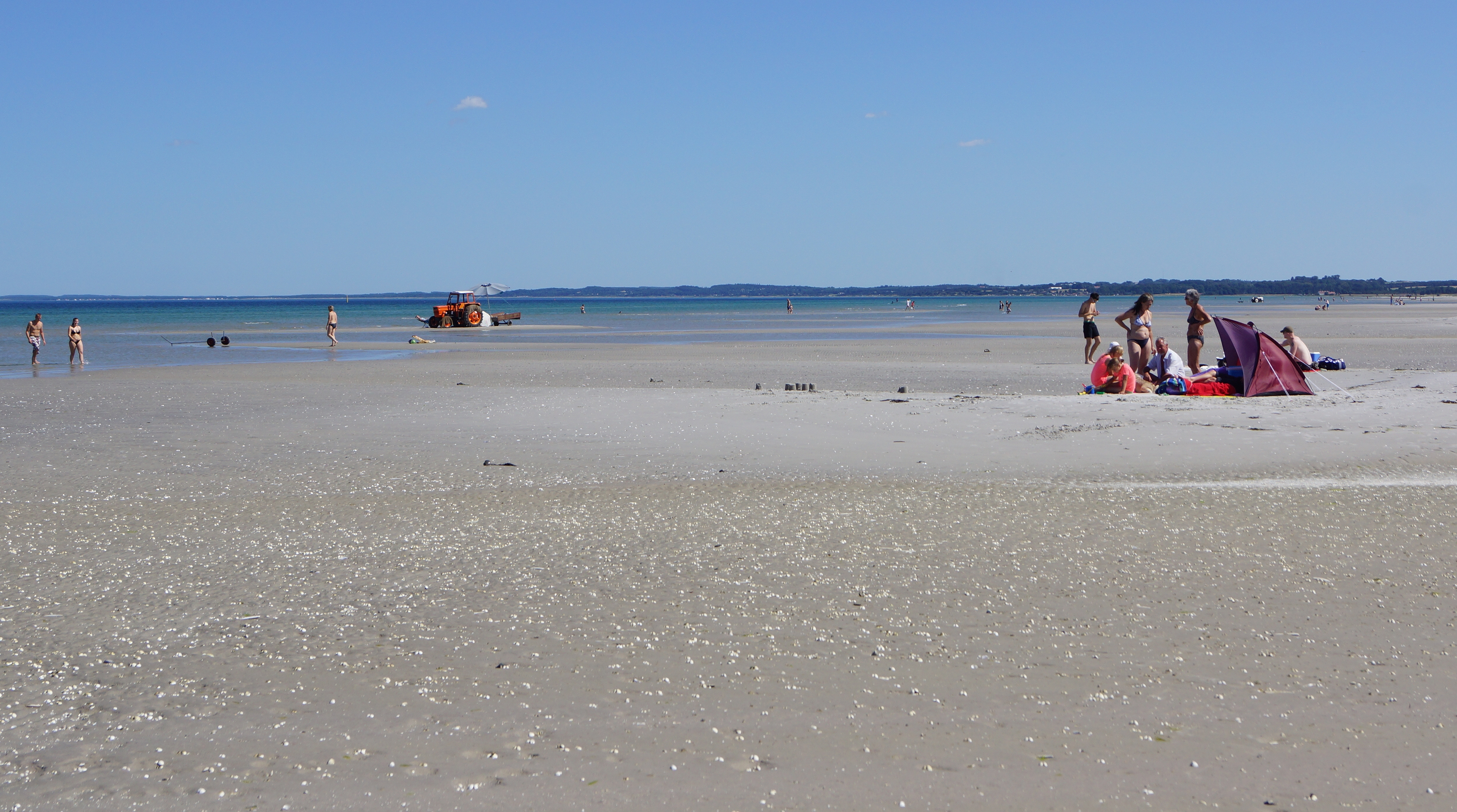
A semi permanent sand bar 400 metres out from the shore is used as a beach at St. Sjørup on the north coast of Djursland

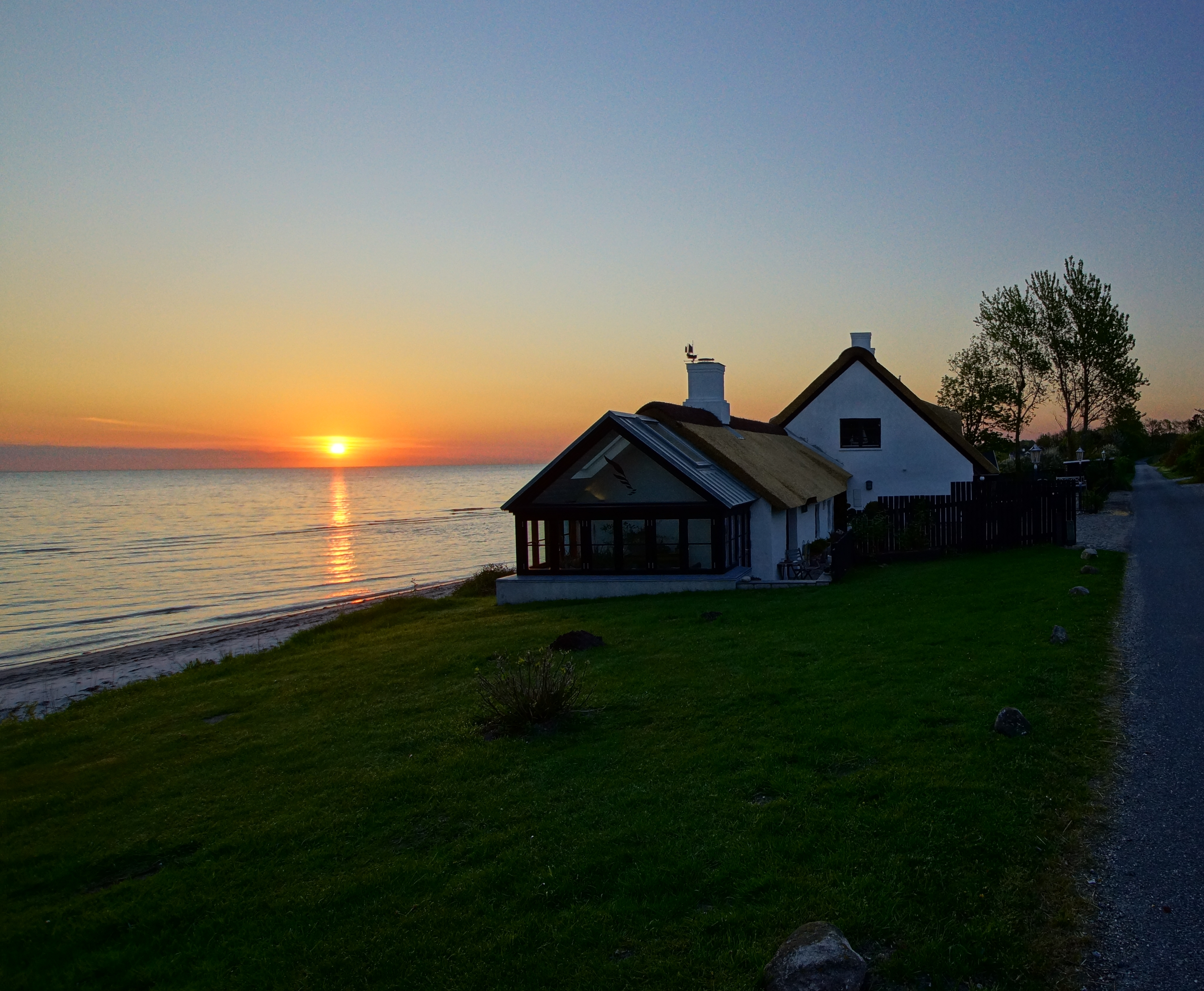
Shallow beach at Havhuse, northern Djursland. Sunrise at midsummer

Between Bønnerup Beach and Gjerrild Beach there is a recreational footpath along the shore. Here a wooded coastal slope goes down to the water as part of the Lillebavle and Emmedsbo Woods in the hinterland. The fact that it is covered with trees going down to a flat stretch with growth before the sea is a sign that this area is not eroding into the sea. It is characteristic for the north coast that there is no coastal erosion. Land is being added, as opposed to the east coast of Djursland where coastal erosion occurs several places.

On the north coast six sandy beaches suitable for swimming are described in the Coastal Map Folder covering Djursland. Starting from the Jutlland side these beaches are, St. Sjørup Strand, Lystrup Strand, Havhuse, Fjellerup Strand, Bønnerup Strand and Gjerrild Nordstrand. Gjerrild Nordstrand is the only one with swimming depth close to the shore. Between these beaches it is also possible to go to the beach, but here access by car can be difficult. According to Danish law all of the coastline in Denmark must be kept open to the public. There is a concentration of summer houses and summer rentals by the mentioned six beaches, and some of the places there are also campsites. Fjellerup Beach is the most visited of the six in summer, with the largest contingency of summer houses and tourist facilities.

Of the northern beaches St. Sjørup is closest to mainland Jutland. It's located where the coast of Djursland turns up towards Jutland 7 kilometers before Randers Fjord. One can wade out to the semi permanent sand bar 400 metres out. At St. Sjørup the transition between land and sea consists of often lush salt tolerant vegetation. Often in tussocks going into the sea without any transition in the form of a beach. St. Sjørup is probably one of the least known of Djursland's beaches, even though it might be seen as the most interesting from a nature area point of view, with wadden sea vegetation, and a wide and long sandbar out in the water, that has some of the classical sandy beach virtues for beach goers.

== Stony East Coast ==
Djursland's east coast is made up of often wide stony beaches. This coastline stretches 50 kilometers to the south from Gjerrild Nordstrand (Gjerrild Northern Beach) to Gåsehage (Goose Hook) to the south, where the Hasnæs-peninsula with the town Ebeltoft contains the southernmost part of the coastline of Djursland. Here the uninhabited Kattegat island, Hjelm, lies 6 kilometers due east of the tip of the Hasnæs peninsula.

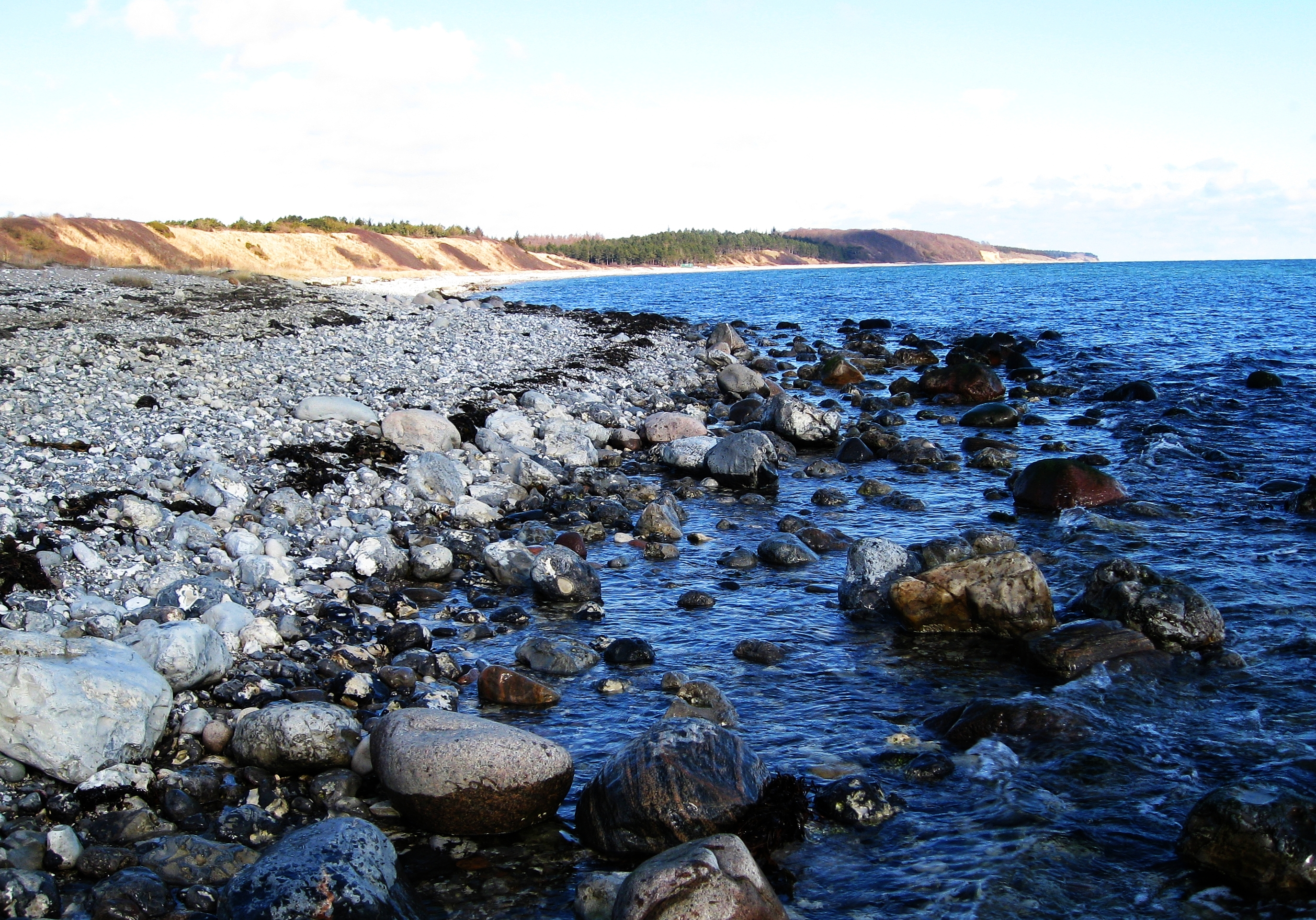
Glatved Strand (Glatved Beach) is a stony beach on eastern Djursland

Out from the stony shores of the east coast it often gets deeper than two meters just 5 – 10 meters from the shore. This east coast is relatively current rich with open unrestricted water all the way across the Kattegat Sea to Sweden. This generates big waves under onshore wind conditions (from the east) with a tendency to wide beaches created by waves washing up onto the shores.

An exception from the eastern stony beaches is the 5 kilometer long Grenå Strand (Grenå Beach) This is a wide sandy beach with dunes. Another exception from the stony beaches of the east coast is the lime cliff coastline of Sangstrup and Karlby. Here the vertical lime cliffs reach all the way to the sea with only a short, or no, beach in between. On a daily basis the average difference between high and low tide is less than 30 centimeters in these waters sheltered from the Atlantic tides by the peninsula Jutland protruding up from Germany. But after storms that drive water in and out of the Baltic, the tidal difference can be over a meter. This also contributes to creation of wide beaches on the exposed east coast of Djursland.

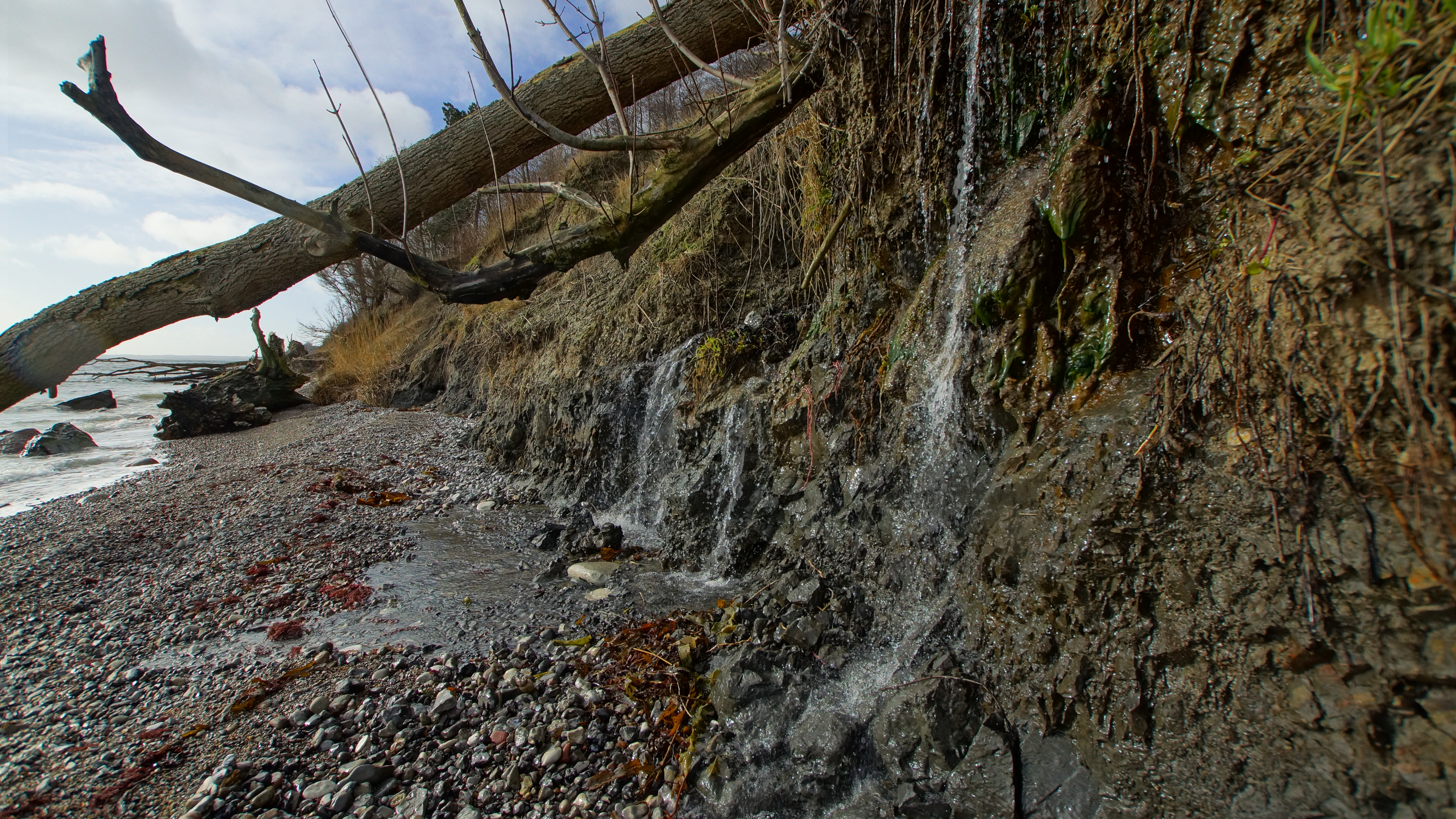
Coastal erosion and waterfall at Rugård Skov (Rugård Forest)

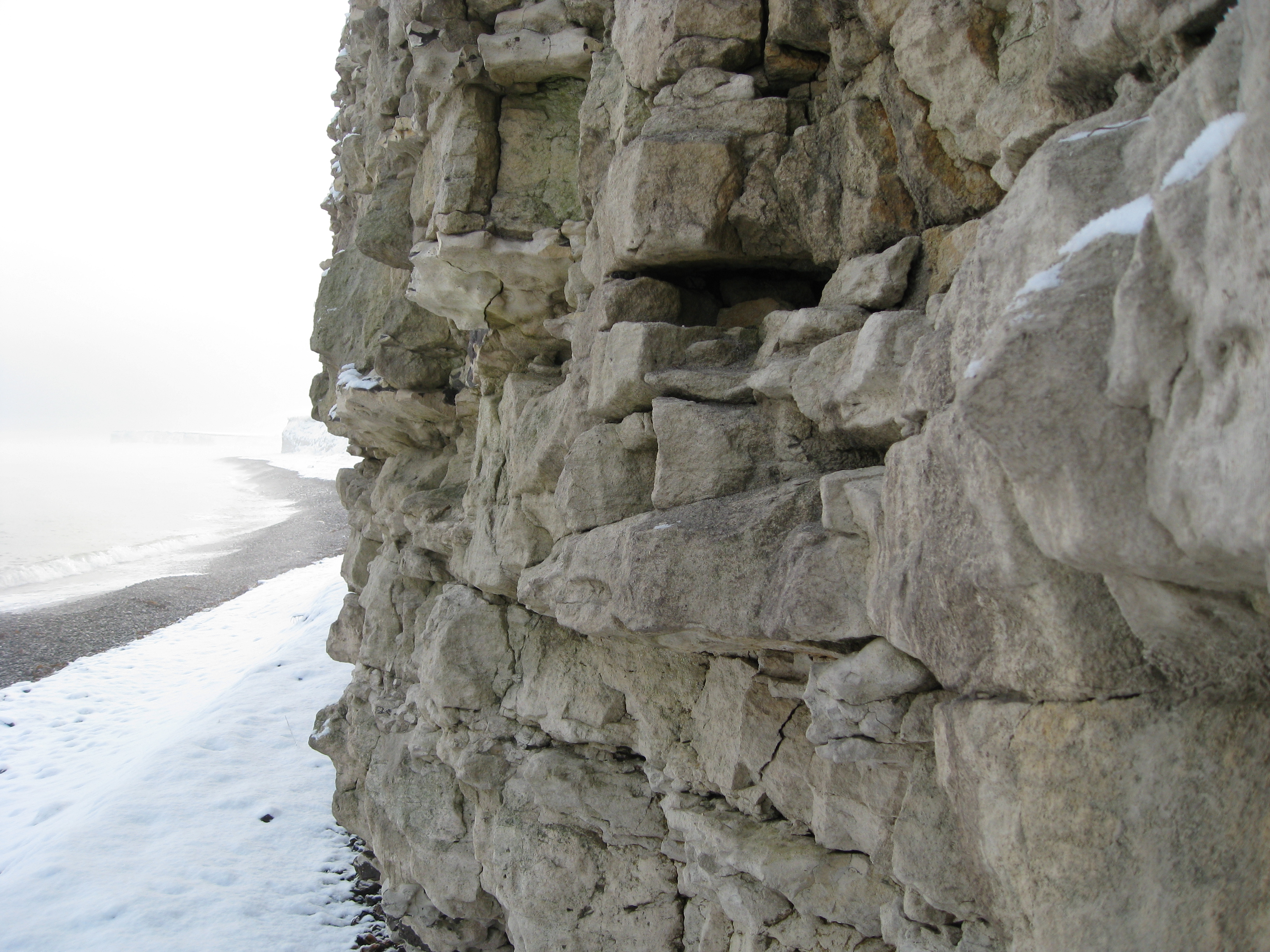
Sangstrup Klint's rock-like lime with layers of flint in between are raised sea bed from the Cretaceous period

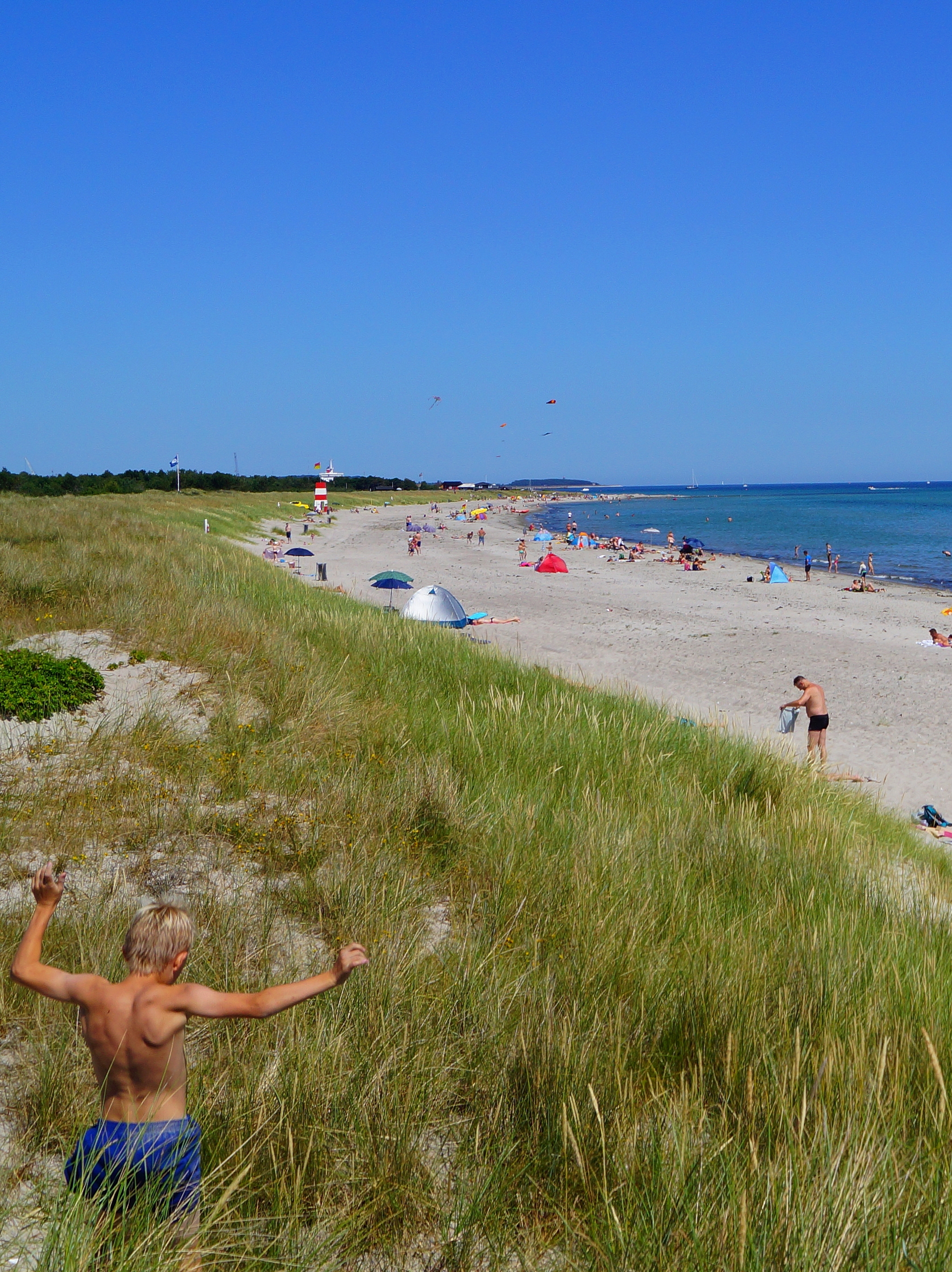
Grenå Sandy beach is an exception from the stony coastlines on eastern Djursland

Djurslands east coast protrudes into the Kattegat Sea, with a tendency to coastal erosion where the land sticks furthest out into the Kattegat sea. Here hills and slopes are gradually washed away. This is the case at Gjerrild Klint to the north, Havknude south of Grenå, the Helligkilde-headland at Glatved Beach and down from Rugård Castle by Rugård Wood. At Rugård one can see a wooded hill consisting of ball clay with large tilted beech trees sliding into the sea.

On the Coastal Map two sandy beaches for swimming are registered on the east coast of Djursland. One of them, Grenå Beach, was selected as one of the three best beaches in Denmark in 2006. Boeslum Strand (Boeslum Beach) is the second sandy beach mentioned on the coastal map. It is located on the Hasnæs peninsula across from Ebeltoft. This beach is sandy with stony parts in between.

The east coast of Djursland has been a source of lime extraction for at least 150 years. In part as rock like blocks taken from heavily cracked but massive underground formations that are close to the surface on eastern Djursland. This is visible in the form of the Sangstrup- and Karlby lime cliffs, with a wall of lime down to the sea. Lime has also been dug up in the form of rounded stones from hills close to the coast. Such as by Glatved located in moraine deposits from the last ice age in a mix with gravel and sand. These rounded lime stones are also common as part of the stony beaches. Such as at Glatved, where the lime stones have been extracted from the beaches on an industrial scale. On the stony east coast rounded white limestones contribute to the visual impression of the shores in a mix with grey-black rounded flint stones.

The east coast of Djursland is appealing to anglers and snorkelers, who are out to catch fish or do underwater photography. For this the eastern coastline is the best suited of the Djursland coasts. In part due to a varied sea bottom with stony stretches upon which seaweed can grow, mixed with sandy areas. This is also because of the relatively current rich conditions favoring healthy oxygen levels. Combined, this helps facilitate varied sea life close to the shore on the east coast of Djursland.

== Sheltered Southern Bays ==
The southern coastline of Djursland is made up of bays and peninsulas. Here the hilly south Djursland meets the sea with many steep inclines down to the sea. The largest bays are: Aarhus Bugt (Aarhus Bay), Knebel Vig (Knebel Bay) Begtrup Vig (Begtrup Bay) and Ebeltoft Vig (Ebeltoft Bay) The largest peninsulas are Hasnæs, Helgenæs, and the Tved-peninsula. Often the southern coastal region lies within Mols Bjerge National Park including coastlines and some of the coastal sea-areas.

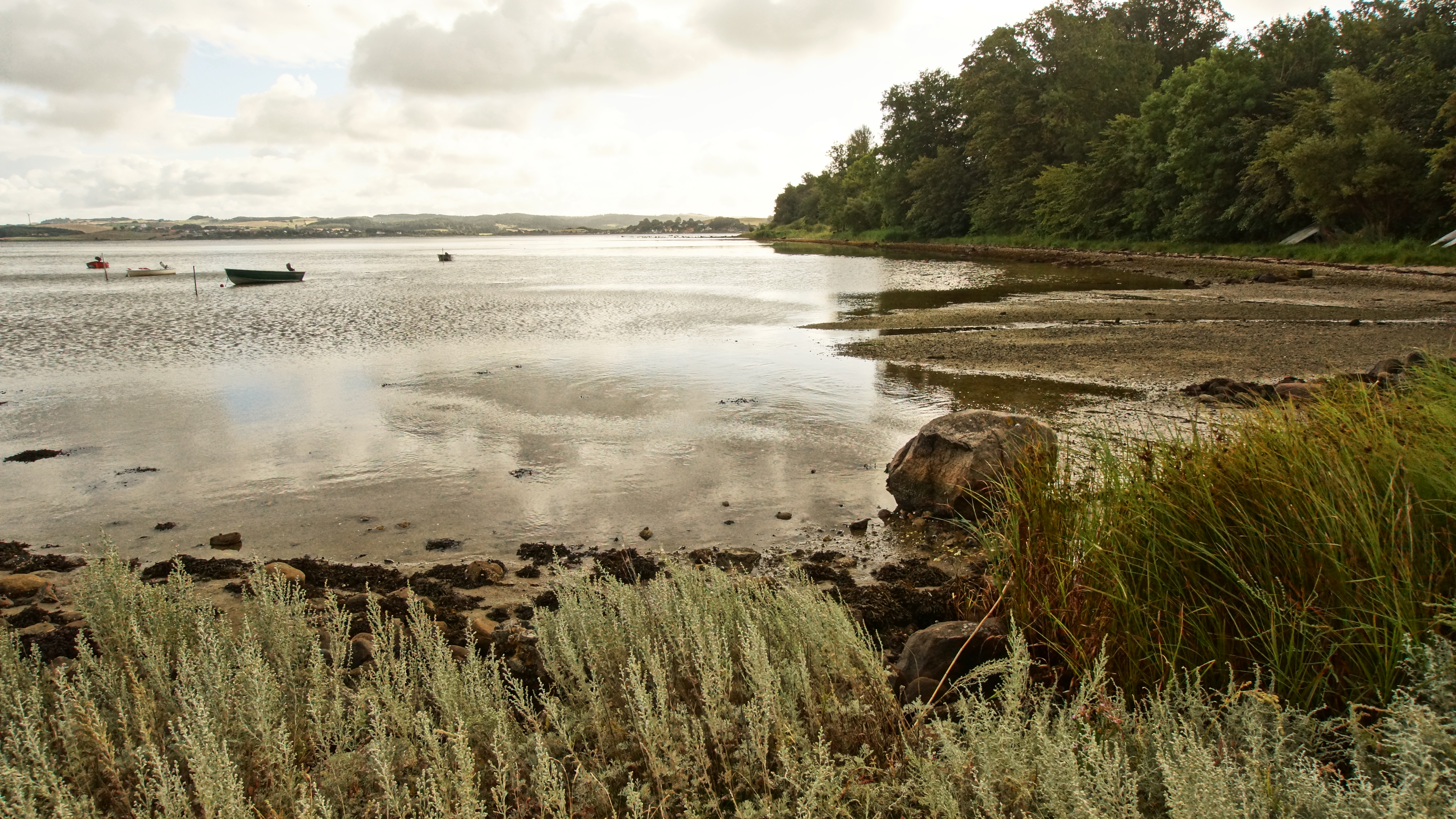
Tved Kær on South Djursland is a protected coast in Knebel Bay. Knebel Bay is a side bay to Århus Bay

On many of the southern shores there isn't much wave action, as there aren't long stretches of sea, where they can grow big before washing ashore creating beaches. Small waves make narrow beaches. Big waves make wide beaches.

Southern Djursland has a mix of different types of stony and sandy beaches. In the more enclosed bays there isn't the same exchange of water as on the exposed eastern shores of Djursland facing the Kattegat Sea. As a consequence the bottom in the southern bay land is home to less fish life, and fewer species of sea weed and other marine life.

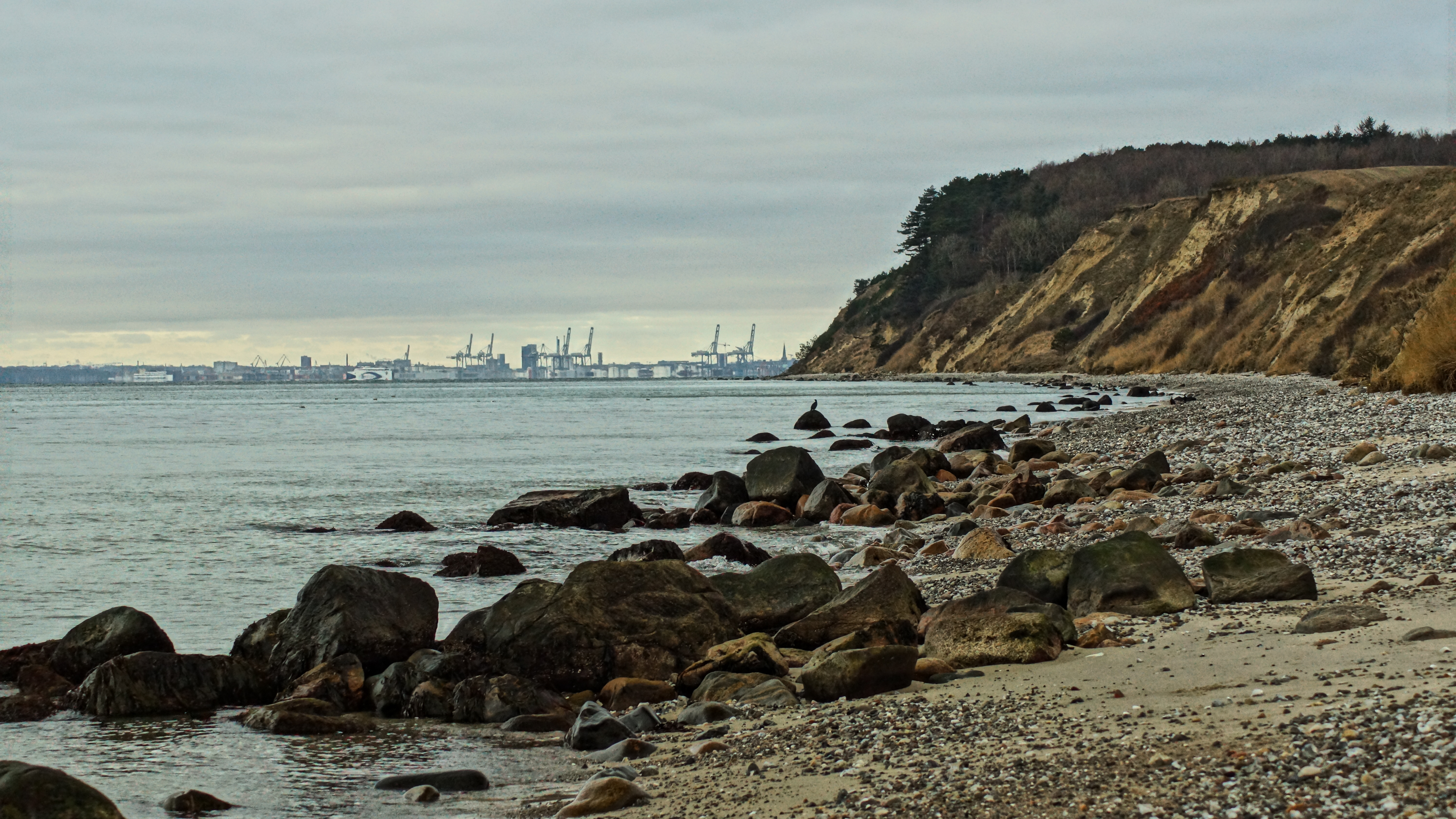
At Mols Hoved (Mols Head) the sea erodes the hills. Århus Port can be seen in the distance across Århus Bay

At the top of Ebeltoft Bay, as well as on the east coast of this bay, opposite the town Ebeltoft, there are several smaller sandy beaches. South facing Strands Strand (Strands Beach) in Begtrup Bay, is a regular wide sandy beach on southern Djursland. A beach that one will not find, unless one knows it's there. It is tucked away at the end of byways on the southern part of the Mols hills, with no large villages, or main roads, close by, even though there are summer houses and summer rentals down to this beach.

== See also ==
- Glatved Beach
- Jernhatten
- Cliffs of Sangstrup
- Kalø Castle
- Randers Fjord
- Helgenæs
- Fornæs Lighthouse
- Sletterhage Lighthouse
- Hjelm
- Anholt
- Århus Bay
- Grenaa Beach
- Hestehave Wood
- Bønnerup Strand
- Voer
- Djursland
- Grenå
- Ebeltoft
