= Randers Fjord =

Danish fjord

Randers Fjord, Denmark
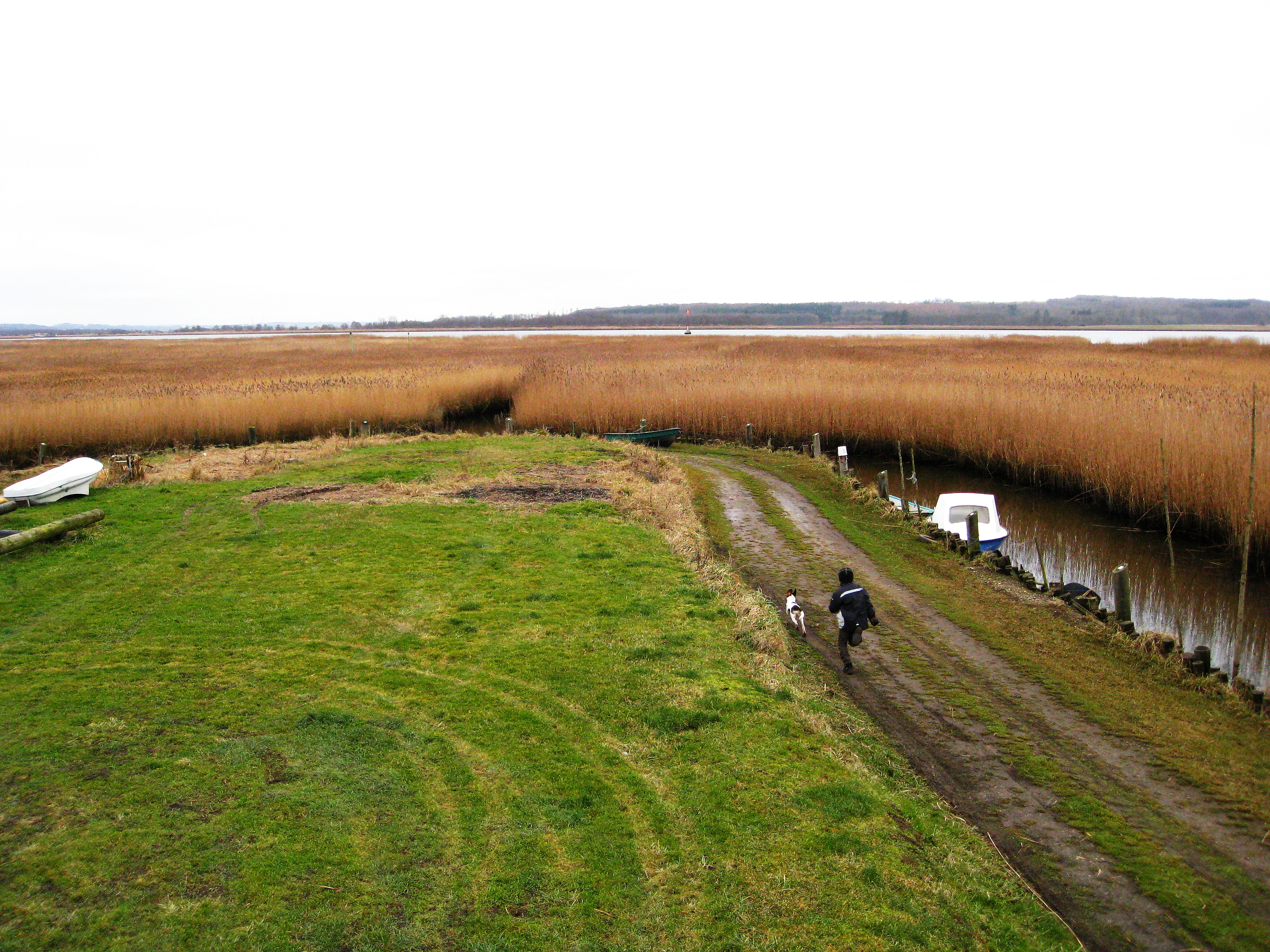

- Location within Denmark
- Location: Norddjurs Municipality
- Nearest city: Randers
- Coordinates: 56°36′28.98″N 10°18′44.75″E
- Area: 13 square km

Ramsar Wetland
- Official name: Randers and Mariager Fjords and The Adjacent Sea
- Designated: 2 September 1977
- Reference no.: 150

Randers Fjord is a 30 km (19 mi) long Danish fjord in Northern Europe leading to the sea of Kattegat, between Denmark and Sweden. The fjord is the outlet from Denmark's longest river, Gudenå. The upper 13 km (8.1 mi), starting at the town Randers, looks more like a broad river than a fjord. The lower 17 km (11 mi) have extensive reed plains bordering the shores To some extent this inhibits the recreational use of and access to the fjord. In some places, the reed beds are harvested for traditional roof thatching. The shallow eastern part of the fjord is known as Grund Fjord, being an extension of Alling Å.

Two small ferries cross Randers Fjord regularly. One is located halfway between Randers and the sea, at the small village of Voer, with a capacity of 3 - 4 cars, crossing the fjord to Mellerup. The other ferry at Udbyhøj is close to Randers Fjords outlet to the sea. This is a cable ferry with a capacity of 12 cars. At the town of Randers, the first bridge crosses the fjord, at the point where it becomes the river Gudenåen. The fjord is navigable for coasters up to Randers.

Randers Fjord is one of eight lowland fjords on the eastern side of the 250 km long Danish main peninsula, Jutland. Jutland protrudes north from Germany in central Europe. The neighboring fjords to Randers Fjord are, Mariager Fjord, 15 km to the north, and, Horsens Fjord, 50 km to the south.

== Angling ==
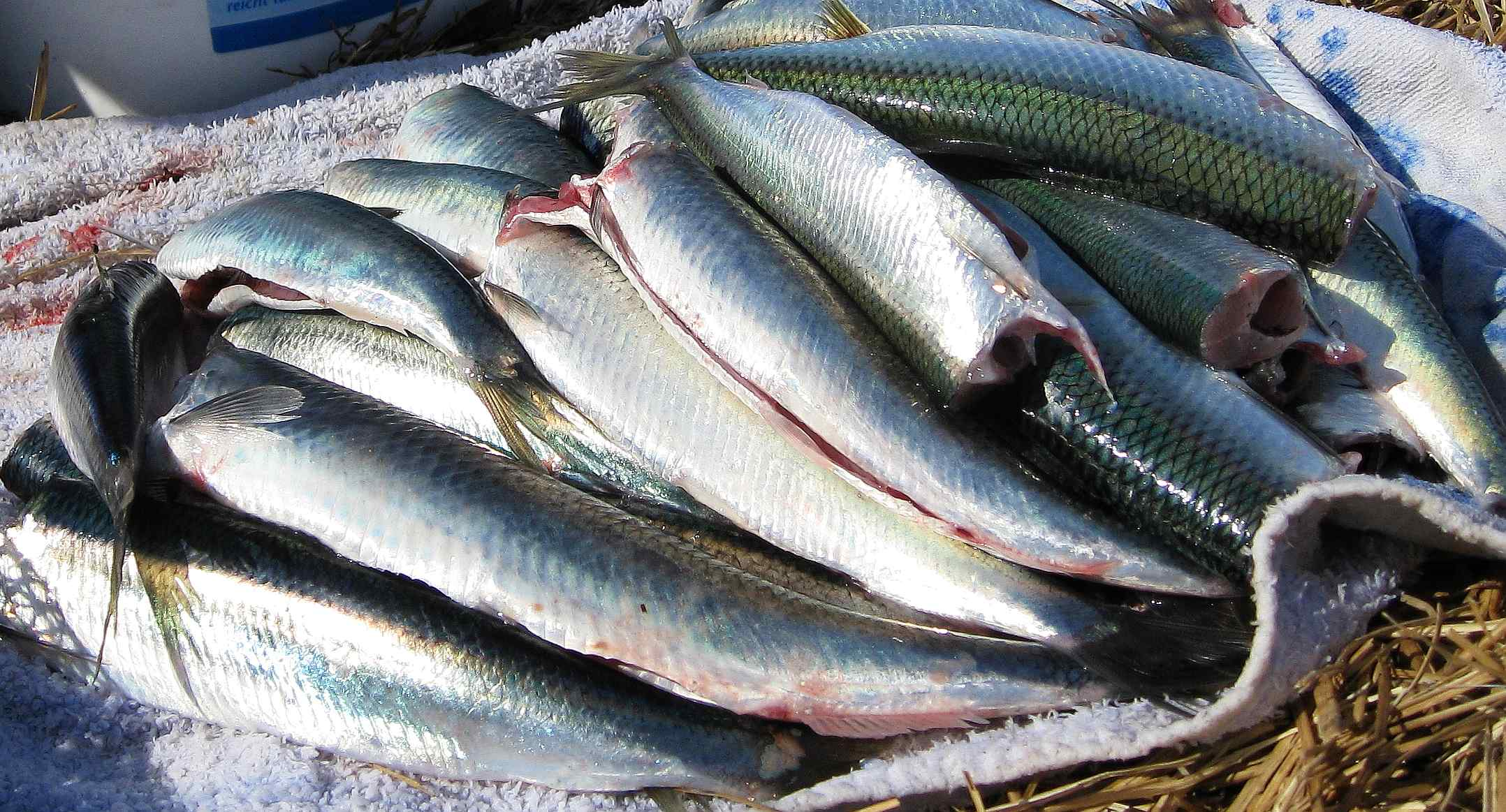
Voer, anglers herring, spring 2013

Anglers from Denmark, as well as from other countries, such as Germany and the Netherlands, travel to Voer in Randers Fjord to catch herring in the season. The season starts in spring and continues throughout summer and autumn. At Voer there is a reed free stretch of bulwark in connection with a shipping channel close to the shore, where the water gets deep fast making it suitable for angling. This relatively deep and narrow stretch also tends to concentrates shoals of herring. Access by car is easy, with space for parking along a dam and unpaved road following the shore a couple of kilometers down from Voer.

For anglers the small marinas a couple of km up from Voer in, Uggelhuse, are also interesting, as fresh water fish, not least, perch, can gather in the marinas to avoid salt water intrusion from the sea in combination with incoming tides. Usually the tidal difference in Randers Fjord is less than 30 cm – one foot.

At Voer lies the Coast and Fjord Centre, (Kyst- og Fjordcentret, in Danish) a nature centre with exhibitions, conference- and accommodation-facilities aimed at informing and teaching about nature and outdoor activities related to Randers Fjord, including the fjords history. At the visiting centre it is also possible to rent boats and to participate in waders-based sessions in the fjord, aimed at various kinds of groups, such as school-classes.

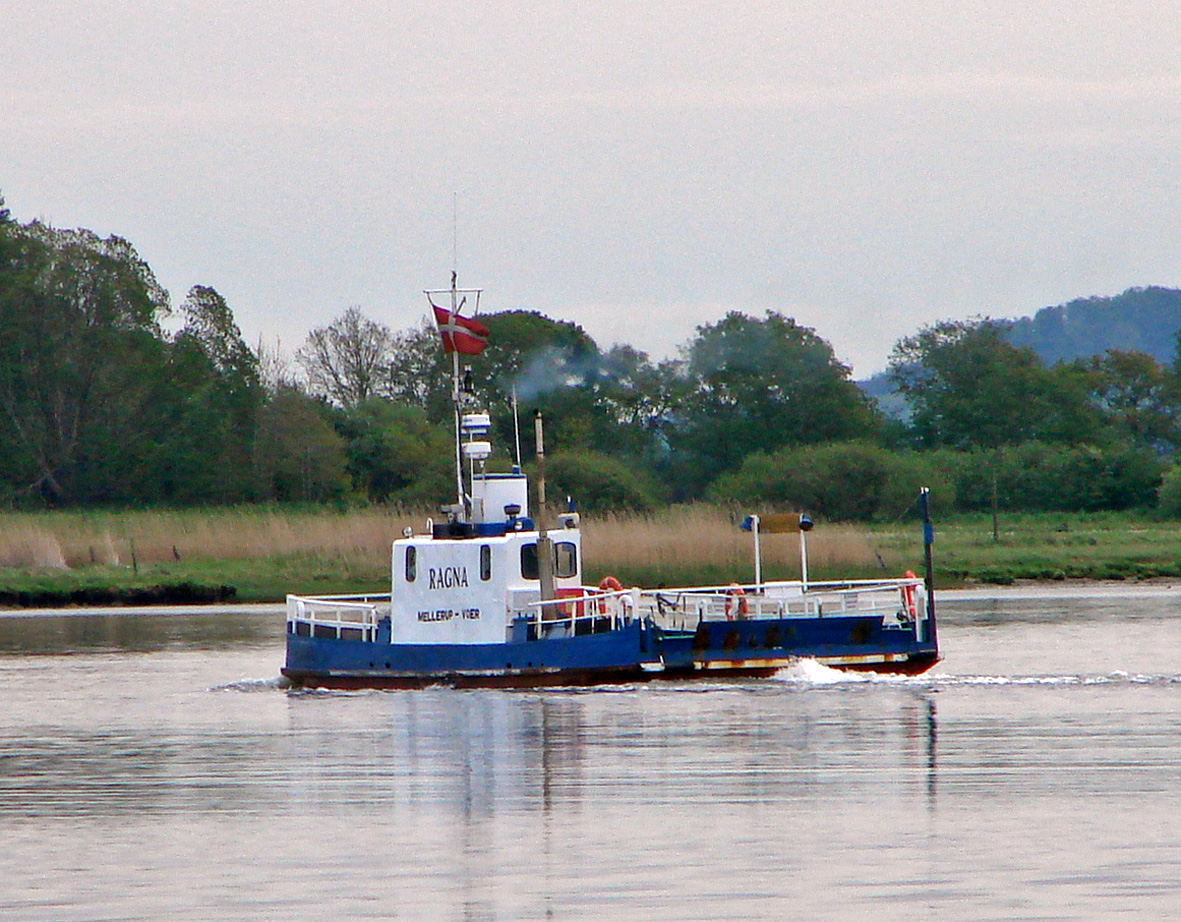
Mellerup-Voer ferry, M/F Ragna

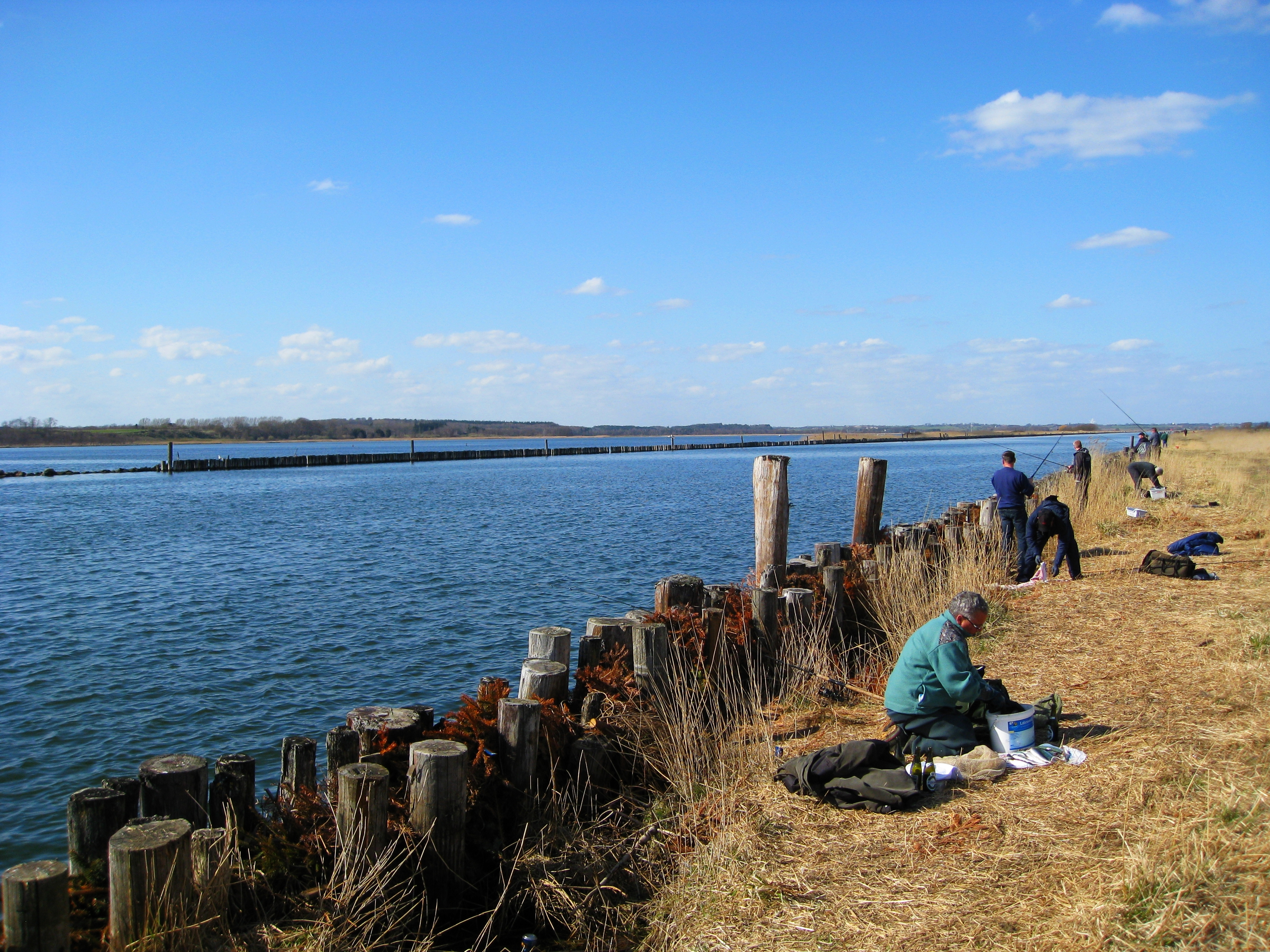
Randers Fjord, anglers at Voer

== Coastal tourism ==
Randers Fjord constitutes the north-west border of the circa 40 km x 40 km peninsula Djursland, a region in Denmark where coastal tourism is a factor. Djursland has 22 sandy beaches located on the three-sided 260 km coastline with in the order of 7.000 adjoining summer-, and out of season-, rentals, primarily situated close to the coast and beaches. All coastlines in Denmark are accessible to the public by law. Djursland has an average population density of 42 inhabitants per square km, as compared to 407 for England and 230 for Germany. Randers at the end of Randers fjord is Denmarks 6. largest town with 60.895 inhabitants. Denmark has a total population of 5.6 million people. The language is Danish, with many inhabitants having a working knowledge of English and also to some extent German - the two main languages taught in schools.

The Innermost part of the Fjord from Voer is part of a Natura 2000-protected area nr. 14 Ålborg Bugt, Randers Fjord og Mariager Fjord and is both a Ramsarhabitat and a bird protection area.

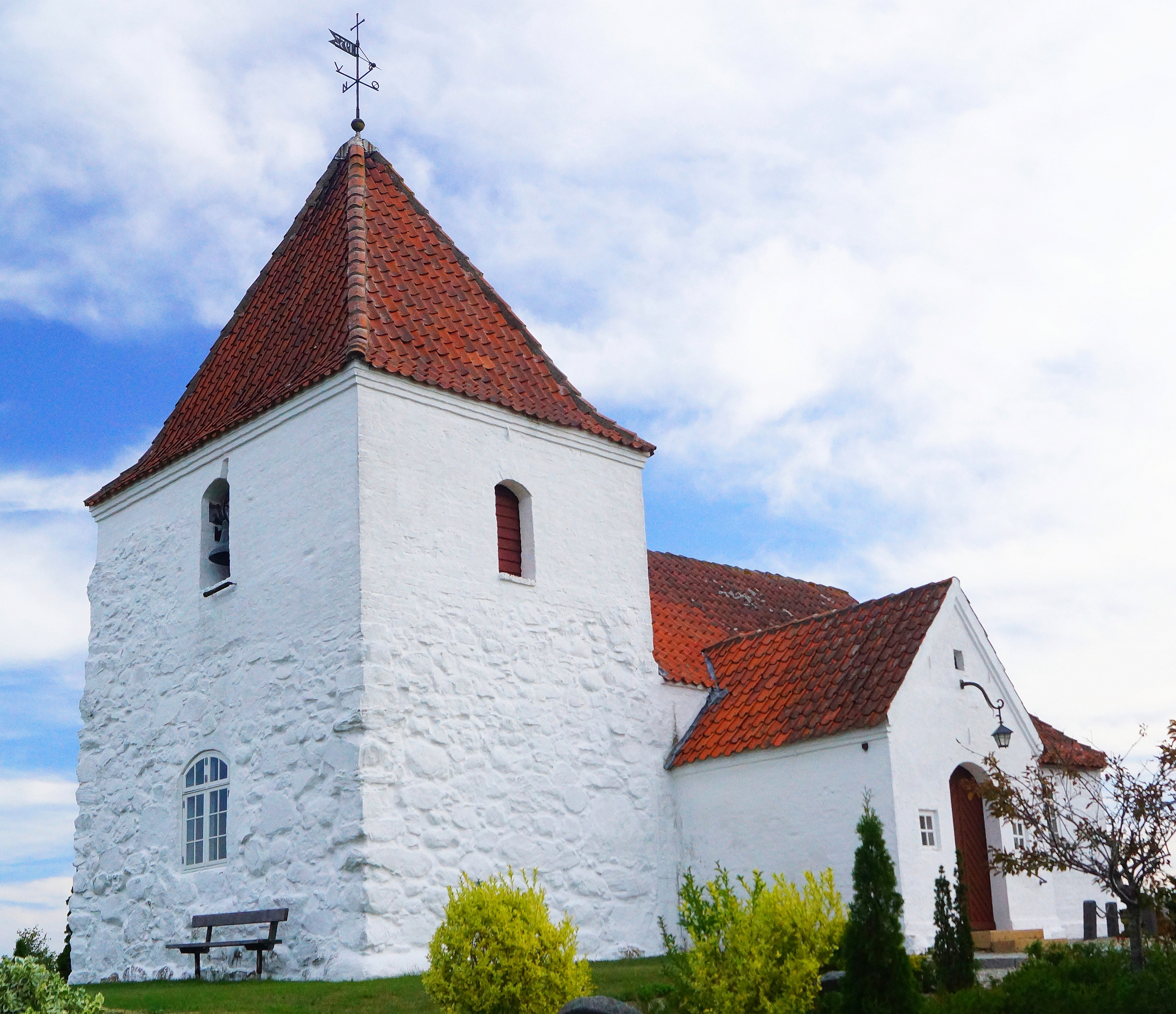
Udby Church is a landmark for incoming ships at the entrance to Randers Fjord

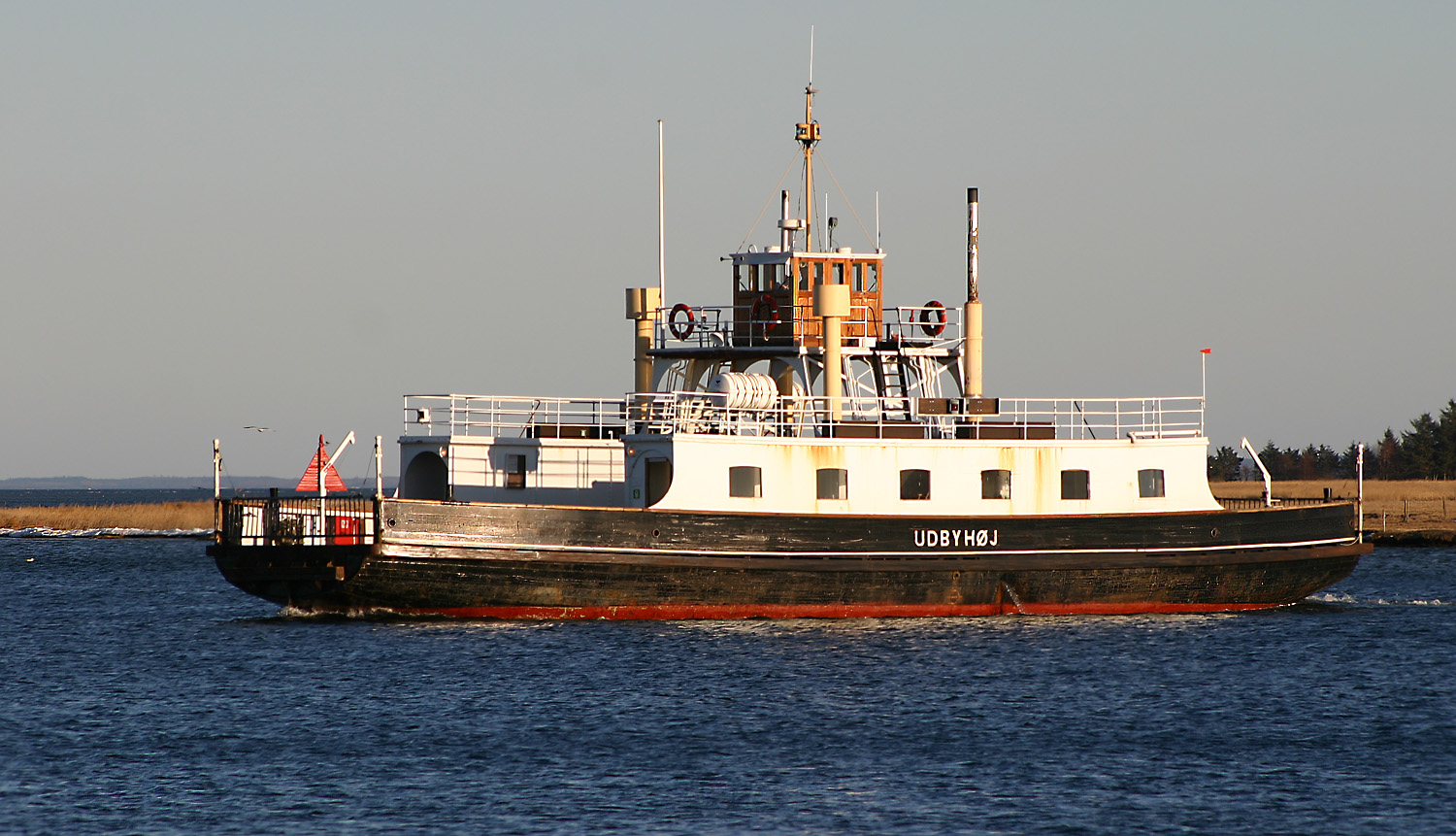
The Old Udbyhøjferry, M/F Udbyhøj.

== Historic Defence Works ==
During the Napoleonic Wars, when Denmark and Britain were on opposite sides, Denmark established 214 coastal defence works at strategic points. One of these was at Udbyhøj at the mouth of Randers Fjord, where a total of ten cannon were sited in two gun emplacements north and south of the fjord entrance. Four gunboats and a unit of cavalry completed the defences.

== Attractions related to Randers Fjord ==
- Coast and Fjord Centre - a nature centre with exhibitions, conference and accommodation facilities aimed at informing and teaching about nature and outdoor activities related to Randers Fjord, including the fjord's history.
- Randers Tropical Zoo – Rain forest zoo by the river Gudenå in transparent domes representing different continents
- Kattegatcentret – Aquarium by the Sea in Grenaa with large sharks and a focus on showing Nordic salt water fish species. Plus seals
- Walks – Such as along the varied and accessible coastlines of Djursland
- Fishing and diving, not least from the eastern coast of Djursland
- Fjord og Kystcentret – visiting centre related to Randers Fjord in Voer – focus on activities with regards to fish, fishing and shore biology, exhibits, boat rentals, and guided tours. Mini car ferry across the Fjord connecting country roads.
- Herring fishing at Voer in Randers Fjord – seasonal
- Kalø Castle - ruined castle on a peninsula with bights, inlets on southern Djursland
- Mushroom picking in the forests and non-farmed areas from August, through autumn until first frost
- Grenaa beach - Grenaa Strand - 5 km sandy beach by Grenaa. Nominated as one of the 2 best beaches in Denmark in 2006
- Mols Bjerge National Park – Hilly ice age like steppe landscape – walks, sightseeing drives, and horseback riding, on southern Djursland
- Djurslands medieval country churches. Thorsager Church is the only round church in Jutland. Udby church by Randers Fjord is a picturesque navigation mark for incoming ships.
- Dansk Motor- og Maskinsamling The Machine Collection by Grenaa on the east coast with the largest collection of stationary engines in Northern Europe going back to 1860. Restored and functioning
- Kalø Vintage Car Rally – Every Tuesday afternoon and evening except in winter, close to Kalø Castle Ruin, southern Djursland
- Djurs Sommerland The largest attraction on Djursland with regards to number of visitors.
- The Agricultural Museum (Landbrugsmuseet) - Farmlife through the times. Extensive historical vegetable gardens and fruit orchards at Gl. Estrup Castle, by the town, Auning
- The Manor Museum (Herregårdsmuseet) at Gl. Estrup Castle, by the town, Auning
- Katholm Castle, south of Grenaa
- Rosenholm Castle by Hornslet, plus other castles and manor houses on Djursland
- Golf - Lübker Golf Resort by Nimtofte, Grenaa-, Ebeltoft- Uggelbølle and other golf-resorts and golf-curses
- Munkholm Zoo – Zoo for families with small children. Often friendly animals and no long walks
- Ree Park – Ebeltoft Safari – includes savanna-like landscapes and large animals.
- Skandinavisk Dyrepark – Zoo -Park with extensive Nordic wildlife park including brown- and polar bears
- Glasmuseet, Ebeltoft. Contemporary international glass art and craftsmanship. Also a lot of local glass-craft in the area
- Fregatten Jylland, Ebeltoft – One of the world's largest wooden warships, restoration for 15 million euros completed in 1998.

== See also ==
- Djursland
- Mols
- Mols Bjerge National Park
- Grenaa
- Ebeltoft
- Glatved Beach
- Danish steam frigate Jylland
- Katholm Castle
- Kalø Castle
- Grenaa Beach
- Bønnerup Strand
- Cliffs of Sangstrup
- Lake Stubbe
- Nakskov Fjord
