= Coast and Fjord Center =

- Kyst- og Fjordcentret
- Location within Denmark
- Location: Norddjurs Municipality
- Nearest city: Randers
- Coordinates: 56°31′10.6″N 10°13′57.9″E

Coast and Fjord Center (Danish: Kyst- og Fjordcentret) by the 30 kilometer (19 mi) long Randers Fjord in Denmark, Northern Europe, is a coastal nature dissemination and visitors center located in the village Voer by the southern bank of Randers Fjord, 15 kilometers from the fjords outlet into the Kattegat sea between Denmark and Sweden. The Kyst- og Fjordcenter is located in Norddjurs Municipality.

The Center is financed through public funding, donations from foundations, and user payment.

External facilities located in the coastal town Grenå 45 kilometers from Voer, include Grenå Naturskole (Grenå Nature School) Facilities in the coastal resort village Fjellerup are also part of the center.

The Coast and Fjord Center has got a varied range of equipment and gear. Including kajaks, canoes, small motor boats and a fast inflatable boat.

The center includes conference facilities and different types of accommodation. Also primitive centered around campfires. In Voer there are six four-room bedrooms, plus tepee like tents in different seizes with room for between 5 and 25 people sleeping in each tepee. There are also six shelters with room for 6-7 people in each shelter.

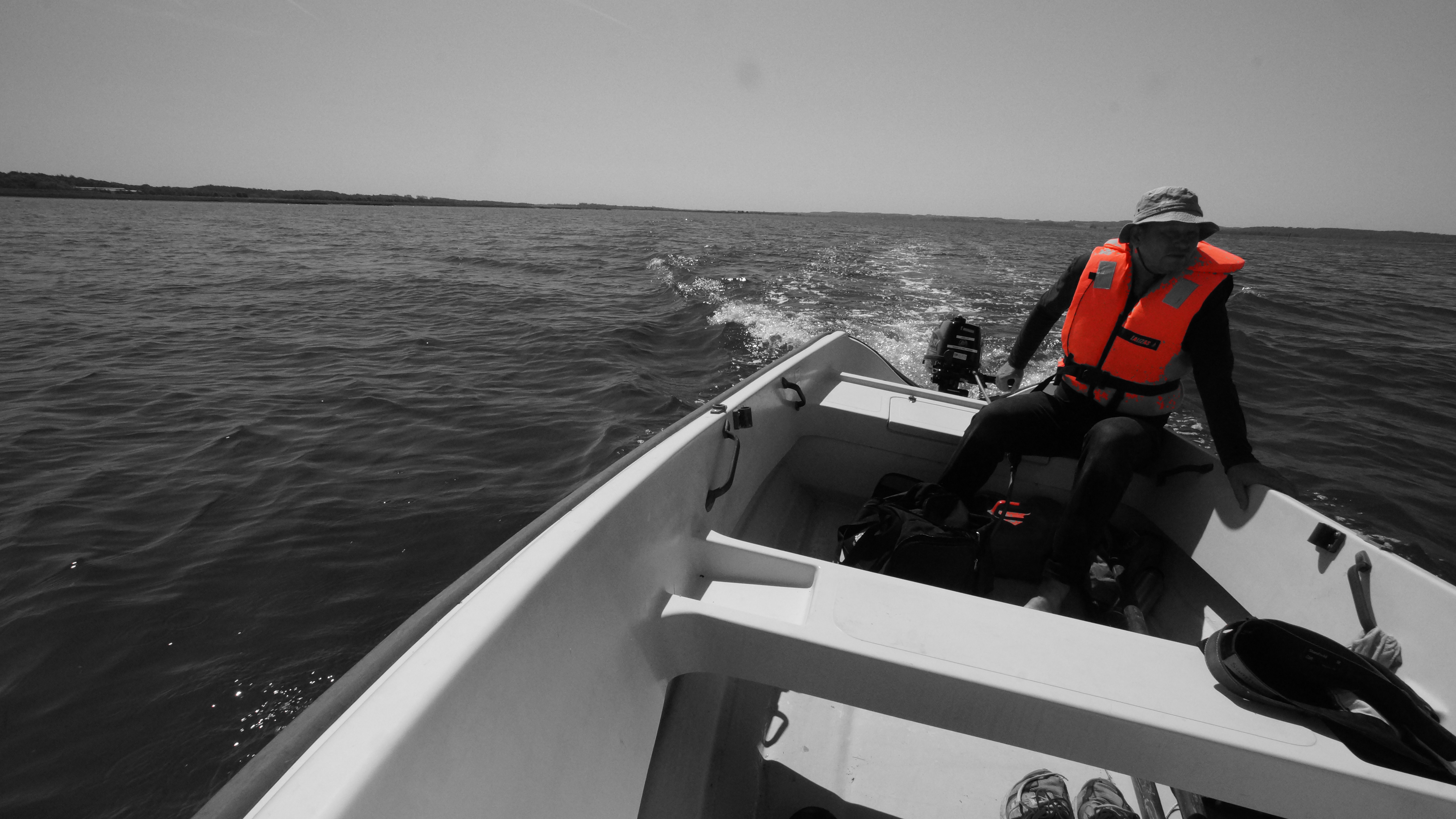
One of the Kyst- og Fjordcenters dinghies on Randers Fjord with a 4 HP, 4-stroke outboard engine.

== Satellite Stations ==
In summer the center supports satellite stations, staffed with nature guides. They are located along the north and east coast of the peninsula Djursland, including in Fjellerup, Bønnerup and Grenå. For example, beachgoers that pass by in Fjellerup can borrow waders, under water binoculars and a fishing net, free of charge and without any formalities. At this station, called, Blue Flag Station Fjellerup, there are also saltwater aquariums, where visitors can release their catch of small fish and other coastal marine life for exhibition.

== Target Groups ==
The primary target groups are schools, businesses (such as teambuilding) and ordinary visitors. The later pay an entrance fee to the center in Voer. According to the Danish homepage, the center can customize stays and courses to individual groups. Sessions may vary in length from hours to days.

== Volunteers ==
Groups of volunteers organized in different guilds are also part of the center. One of the summer activities, that a volunteer guild, The Practitioners, is responsible for, is attending to gillnets in Randers Fjord with the use of small motor boats going out to tend the nets together with visitors. This includes catching fish, typically flounders, followed by outdoor preparation of the fish in different ways. Such as by roasting over open fire or by smoking, after which the participants can eat the prepared fish. In spring large schools of herring migrate up Randers Fjord past the center. This species is also part of the fishing and food preparing activities together with visitors.

== See also ==
- Randers Fjord
- Glatved Beach
- Cliffs of Sangstrup
- Bønnerup Strand
- Djursland
