= Ragna =

Ragna is a feminine given name. It may refer to:

- Ragna Agerup (born 1995), Norwegian Olympic sailor
- Ragna Ahlbäck (1914–2002), Finnish ethnographer and archivist
- Ragna Árnadóttir (born 1966), Icelandic lawyer, politician and former Minister of Justice and Ecclesiastical Affairs of Iceland
- Ragna Breivik (1891–1965), Norwegian tapestry designer and weaver
- Ragna Margrét Brynjarsdóttir (born 1990), Icelandic basketball player
- Ragna Debats (born 1979), Dutch snowshoe runner, trail runner and sky runner
- Ragna Flotve (born 1960), Norwegian politician
- Ragna Johanne Forsberg (1908–1984), Norwegian politician
- Ragna Grubb (1903–1961), Danish architect
- Ragna Hørbye (1861–1950), Norwegian politician
- Ragna Ingólfsdóttir (born 1983), Icelandic former badminton player
- Ragna Berget Jørgensen (born 1941), Norwegian politician
- Ragna Kjartansdóttir (born 1980), stage name Cell7, Icelandic rapper, songwriter and audio engineer
- Ragna Linne (1862–1934), Norwegian soprano and voice teacher
- Ragna Nielsen (1845–1924), Norwegian pedagogue, school headmistress, publicist, organizer, politician and feminist
- Ragna Nikolasdatter (died 1161), queen consort of King Eystein II of Norway
- Ragna Patawary (born 1980), Faroese footballer
- Ragna Rask-Nielsen (1900–1998), Danish biochemist and medical researcher
- Ragna Róbertsdóttir (born 1945), Icelandic artist
- Ragna Schirmer (born 1972), German classical pianist
- Ragna Sigurðardóttir (author) (born 1962), Icelandic writer, translator and artist
- Ragna Sigurðardóttir (politician) (born 1992), Icelandic politician
- Ragna Thiis Stang (1909–1978), Norwegian historian and museum administrator
- Ragna Wettergreen (1864–1958), Norwegian actress

== See also ==
- Ragna Lóa Stefánsdóttir (born 1966), Icelandic former footballer, given name Ragna Lóa
