= Voer færgested =

Coordinates: 56.5210°N 10.2708°E

Fjordcentret Voer Færgested is a nature center in Denmark, located south of Randers Fjord. Located near Voer Færgested a dock for ferries to Mellerup north of the fjord.

The nature center features activities like:

- an exhibition
- voyage by canoe
- fishing
- a trip in the water, with waders.

The exhibition includes topics like plants, life in the water, protection of water environment etc.
