= Ragna Ahlbäck =

Finnish ethnographer

Ragna Ahlbäck (1914 – 2002) was a Finnish ethnographer and archivist.

== Early life ==
Ragna Ulrica Ahlbäck (née Nikander) was born on 17 July 1914 in Porvoo. She grew up in Turku where her father, cultural historian and professor Gabriel Nikander, taught at Åbo Akademi University. Niklander completed her doctoral dissertation in 1955. "Kökar: näringslivet och dess organisation i en utskärssocken" established her as a pioneer in the area of Nordic studies.

== Family life ==
Ragna married the linguist Olav Ahlback. The couple had a son, Tore, who became a theologian and librarian.

== Career ==
Ahlbäck served over 44 years as archivist for Svenska Litteratursällskapet Finland, the Swedish Literature Society's folklore archive in Finland. She began her professional work in 1937, which included field work throughout Finland, and later, Sweden. In 1965 she moved to Malax where she founded the Kvarken Boat Museum with her husband.

== Later life ==
Alback died in Pargas on 6 September 2002. Her extensive research archives, including a number of films from the 1950s and 1960s featuring traditional farming and fishing practices, are held at the Swedish Literature Society archives.

== Bibliography ==
- Ahlbäck, Ragna (1984). Prästgårdsmuseet i Korsnäs. Korsnäs: Föreningen Prästgårdsmuseet i Korsnäs.
- Ahlbäck, Ragna (1983). Bonden i svenska Finland: teori och praktik inom akerbruk och boskapsskötsel. Helsingfors: Svenska Litteratursällskapet i Finland. ISBN 978-951-9017-85-3.
- Ahlbäck, Ragna (1981). Fynd och forskning: till Ragna Ahlbäck 17.7.1981. Helsingfors.
- Ahlbäck, Ragna (1979). "Byråd och sockenstämma". Svenska Österbottens historia. 2.: 173–217. OCLC 937129660.
- Härö, Elias; Kaila, Panu; Ahlbäck, Ragna; Svenska Österbottens landskapsförbund (1978). Österbottensgården: handbok för renovering. Seinäjoki; Vasa: Etelä-Pohjanmaan maakuntaliitto; Sv. Österbottens landskapsförb. ISBN 978-951-99084-2-7.
- Ahlbäck, Ragna (1976). Amerikatrunken: emigranter berättar om sig själva. Helsinki: Schildt. ISBN 978-951-50-0111-5.
- Krooks, Sven-Erik; Ahlbäck, Ragna; Jern, Kurt (1975). Österbotten / 1974; ostrobothnia Australis; 1924-1974 / red.: Svens-Erik Krooks, Ragna Ahlbäck & KurJern. Vasa: Svensk-österbottniska samfundet.
- Mäkinen, Vesa; Ahlbäck, Ragna (1974). Kaunis Suomi 3. 3. Porvoo; Helsinki: WSOY. ISBN 978-951-0-00025-0.
- Ahlbäck, Ragna; Svenska Österbottens litteraturförening (1972). Röster, vägar: ny österbottnisk lyrik. Smedsby: Utg.
- Ahlbäck, Ragna; Estlander, Carl; Jern, Kurt (1971). Utgivna av Svensk-österbottniska Samfundet.
- Ahlbäck, Ragna (1971). Socklots byrätts protokoll 1751-1761. Helsingfors: Svenska litteratursällskapet i Finland.
- Ahlbäck, Ragna (1967). "De österbottniska byordningarna och deras bakgrund". Västerbotten (Umeå. 1920). 1967: 199–206. ISSN 0346-4938.
- Ahlbäck, Ragna (1959). "Finlandssvensk folklivsforskning 1908-58". Svenskbygden: 14–16. ISSN 0356-1755.
- Ahlbäck, Ragna (1958). Esbo kommun under femhundra år, 1458-1958. Helsingfors: publisher not identified.
- Ahlbäck, Ragna (1955). Kökar: näringslivet och dess organisation i en utskärssocken. Helsingfors: Svenska Lit.-Sällsk. i Finland.
- Ahlbäck, Ragna (1946). Gods och herresäten i Finland. Helsingfors.
- Ahlbäck, Ragna (1945). Kulturgeografiska kartor över Svenskfinland. Helsingfors: Mercator.
