= Ragna Kjartansdóttir =

Icelandic R&B and pop singer

Cell7
- Born: Ragna Kjartansdóttir; 10 June 1980 (age 46)
- Genre: Rap
- Occupations: Singer, songwriter, audio engineer
- Years active: 1996 – present

Ragna Kjartansdóttir (born 10 June 1980), better known by her stage name, Cell7, is an Icelandic rapper, songwriter and audio engineer. Her father grew up in Denmark; her mother is from the Philippines. Ragna broke into the Icelandic musical scene in 1996 with the band Subterranean. In 2013, she published her first solo album named CELLF. In 2015 she joined Hildur Kristín Stefánsdóttir in the band Red Riot. In 2017 she published the single City Lights. In 2019, she published her second solo album, Is Anybody Listening?.

== Discography ==
=== Albums ===
- 2013: CELLF
- 2019: Is Anybody Listening?

=== Singles ===
- 2017: "City Lights"
- 2019: "Peachy"
- 2019: "All Night (Hermigervill Remix)"
- 2021: "Sweatpant Boots"
- 2021: "It's Complicated"

== Personal life ==
Ragna holds the black belt in Karate. She was the Icelandic champion in Kata in 2007.
