= Mellerup =

- Village
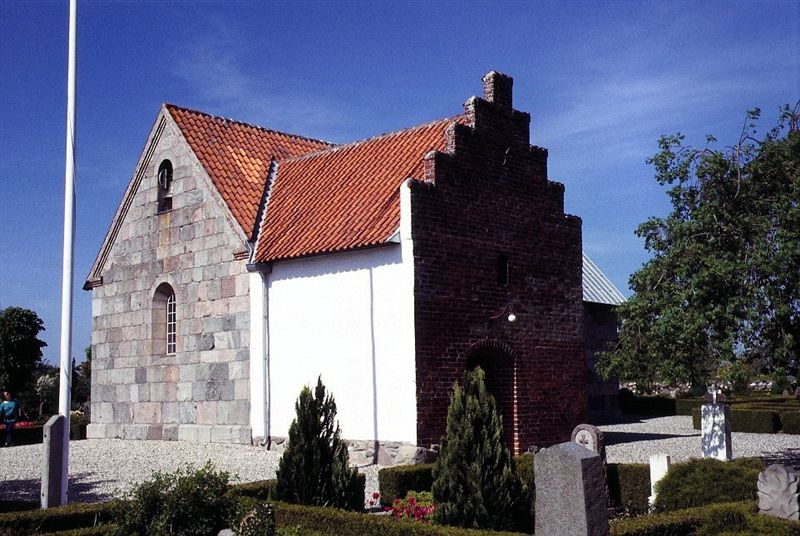
- Mellerup Church

- Location in Central Denmark Region Mellerup (Denmark)
- Coordinates: 56°31′16″N 10°12′16″E
- Country: Denmark
- Region: Central Denmark Region
- Municipality: Randers Municipality

Population (2026)
  - Total: 496
- Time zone: UTC+1 (CET)
  - Summer (DST): UTC+2 (CEST)

Mellerup is a village in the Danish municipality of Randers with a population of 496 in January 2026. It is located at the western shore of Randers Fjord 12 km northeast of Randers

Mellerup church is located in the village.

Mellerup Fri og Efterskole, a music efterskole, is located in the southern part of Mellerup.

Mellerup-Voer ferry route, crossing Randers Fjord at Mellerup, is one of the shortest ferry routes in Denmark with a length of only 470 metres.
