= Glatved Beach =

Beach in Denmark

- Beach
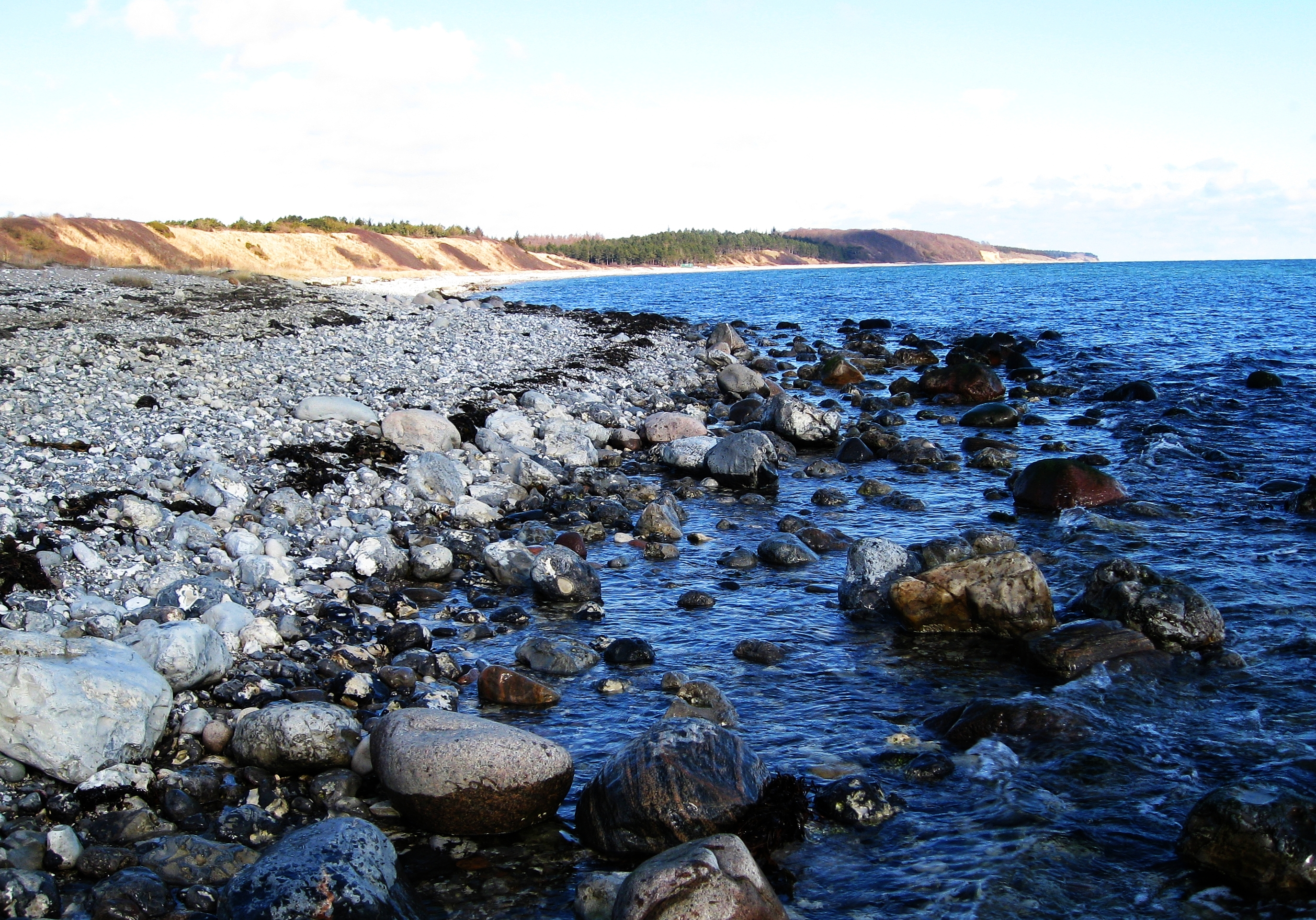
- Glatved Beach in winter

- Coordinates: 56°18′N 10°52′E
- Location: Norddjurs, Denmark

Glatved Beach is a coastline 10 km south of the town Grenaa in Denmark. The 5 km long beach is part of a stony coastline with fairly deep water close to the shore, spanning the 50 km long eastern shore of the peninsula, Djursland, and situated by the Kattegat sea. This stony coast starts at The Cliffs of Gjerrild to the north on Djursland, and ends 50 km to the south on Mols at the southern tip of the peninsula.

== Accessibility ==
The road Glatved Strandvej, is the only public access road to the southern end of this rarely visited fishermans-, scuba divers- and nature-seekers coast, between the forest of Katholm Skov and the sea of Kattegat. Katholm Skov is a fairly secluded wood, along Glatved beach on the central eastern coast of Djursland. Mostly for locals familiar with the geography, there is one other accessway, making it possible to get to the northern part of Glatved Beach, via the village, Ålsrode, and the road, Skovlystvej.

== Limestone quarries ==
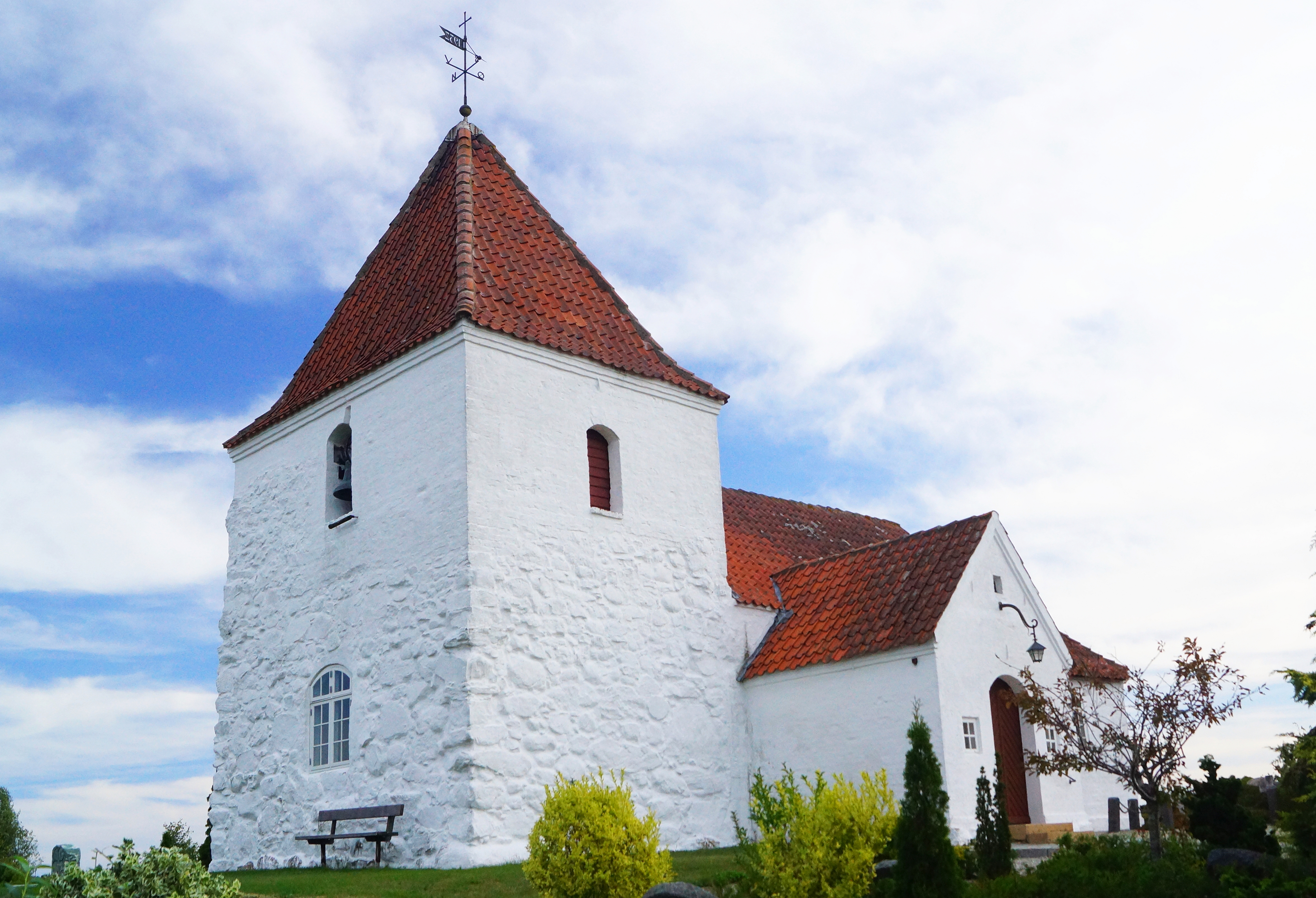
Burnt lime from Glatved is traditional used for whitewashing

The southern part of Glatved Beach is dominated by a man made plain, originating from limestone extraction going back at least 150 years. The plain consists of now fairly levelled out heaps of stones, that up until the fifties where dumped from rail-wagons coming from an industrial lime kiln at the southern end of the beach, after the lime-stones had been sorted out. The kiln was placed at the end of Katholm Strandvej. In the sea out from Glatved Beach, are the remains of a 65-million-year-old cold water coral reef, consisting of a limestone formation with layers of flint. This reef is the source of the stony coast of Glatved, and the hills behind. This underground lime-formation stretches throughout the Danish underground, and is also exposed at The Cliffs of Møn (Møns Klint) on the south-eastern island of Denmark, Møn. Here there are coastal cliffs similar to the Cliffs of Dover in England. The formation also surfaces as The Cliffs of Sangstrup, Sangstrup Clint, 20 km north of Glatved Beach in the middle of Denmark, and again in the northern part of the country south of the town, Aalborg. Here the lime is extracted as an ingredient for cement production. The industrial lime kiln at Glatved Strandvej was torn down around year 2000. At the furnace here, limestone was burned and converted into calcium oxide, burnt lime, which in the form of slaked lime was used for mortar production and for white washing of buildings - a widespread surface treatment for masonry in the past, seen on traditional white washed Danish country Churches, and on many old and white washed farms and houses in the Danish countryside. Today only gravel and stones are extracted from the hills behind Glatved Beach. At the end of Glatved Strandvej is a pier for embarkment of this raw material.

== Angling ==
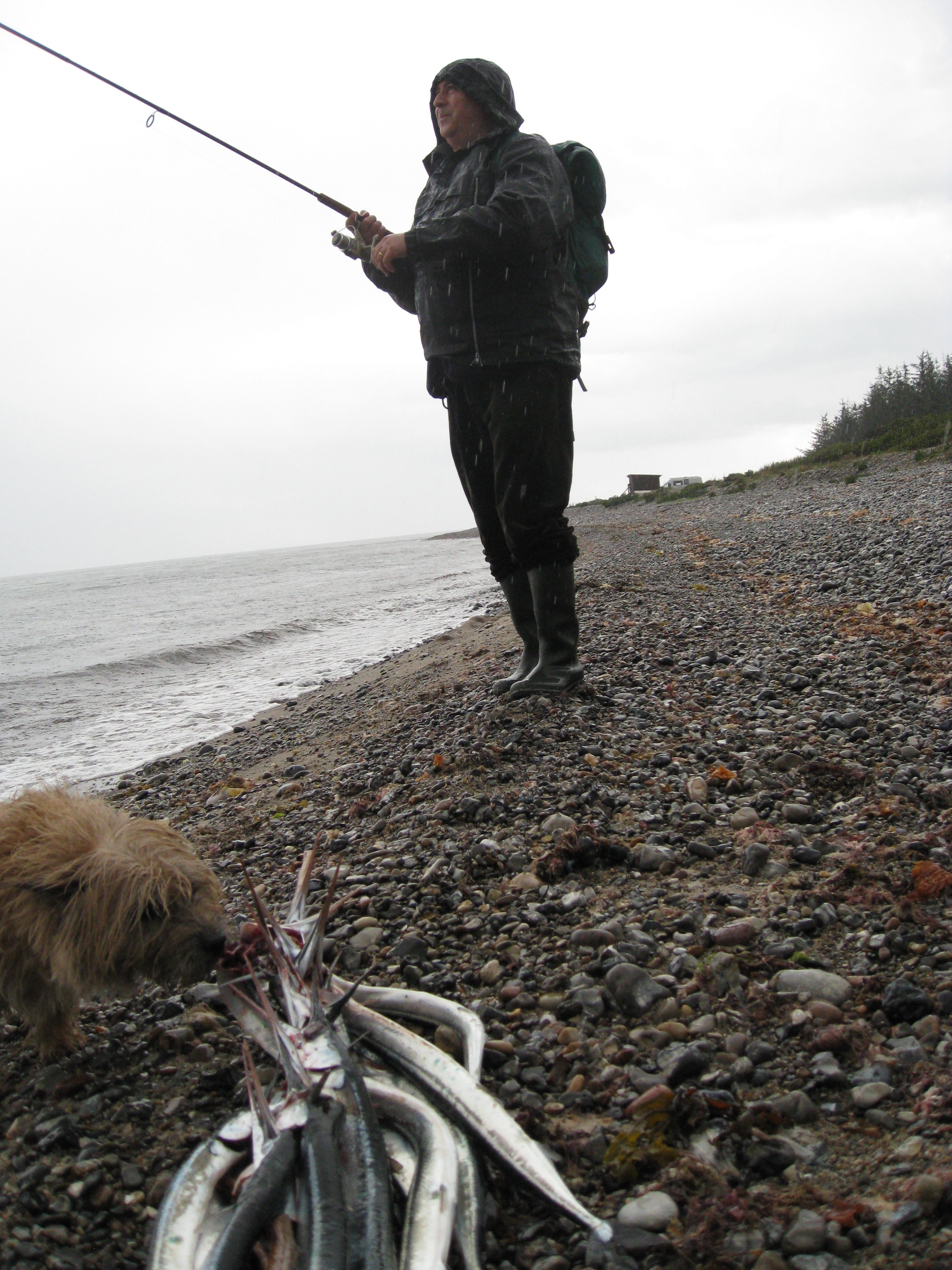
Glatved Beach is a good spot for catching garfish, as they migrate through Kattegat from The North Sea to the Baltic Sea in late spring to spawn, and back again in autumn.

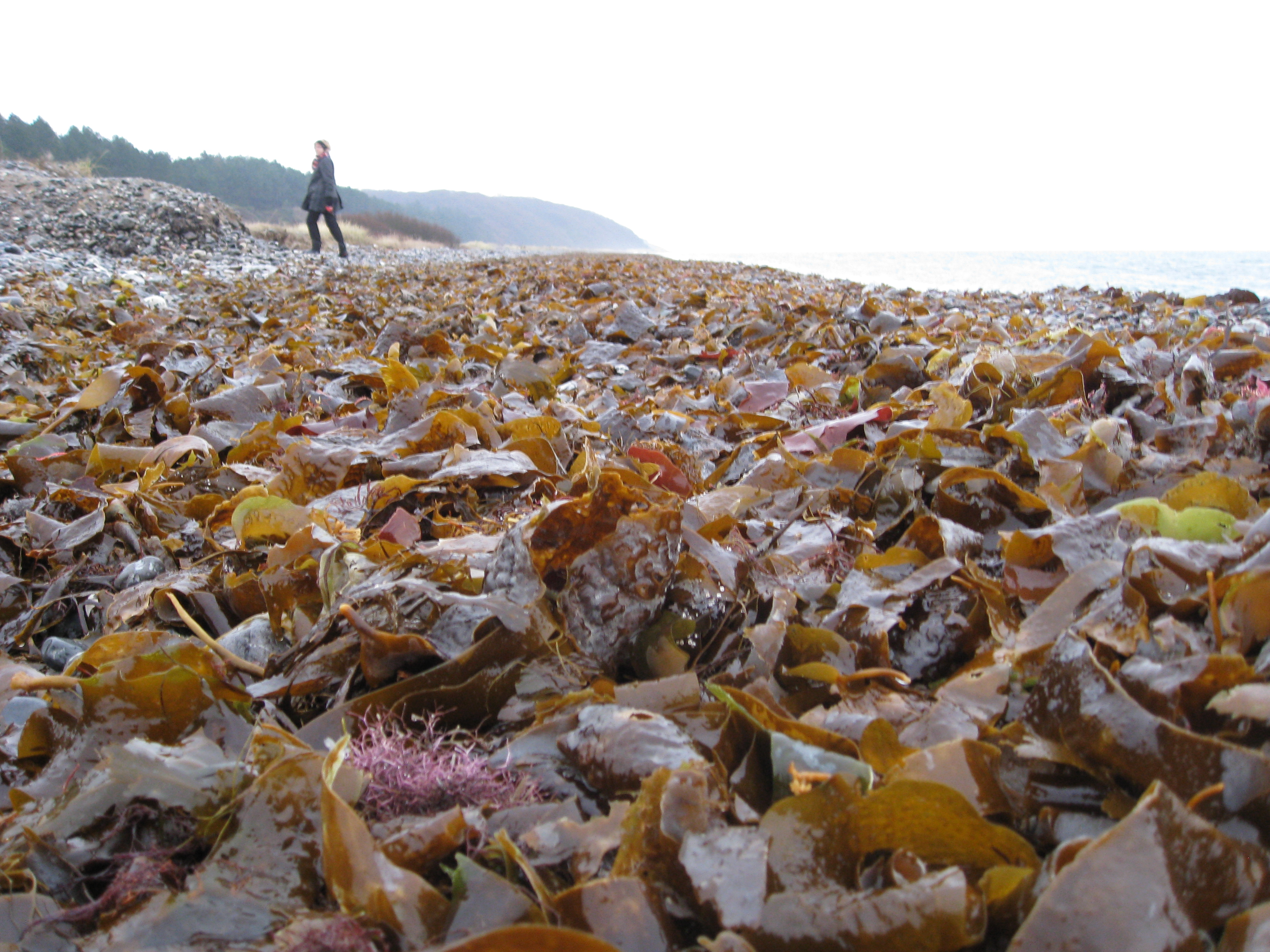
Offshore kelp forests at Glatved Beach, forms the basis of an abundant marine life.

Glatved Beach is an angling and scuba diving area. It gets deep fast enough, for fishing close to the shore. Facing the sea of Kattegat, the coast has some current and good water exchange enabling oxygen-rich conditions. The tidal difference is moderate in the scale of 15 – 30 cm. The bottom is mostly stony, as a habitat for marine life and a hold for seaweed, promoting fish life. There are spots with sand in between, giving living conditions for flatfish. Flounder and dab are common flatfish at Glatved Beach. Until the seventies, there was an abundance of cod, but today (2014) cod has become a rare species from all the shores of Djursland. A marked and abrupt change in fish zoology. Garfish, sea trout and mackerel are more abundant now than previously.

== Gallery ==
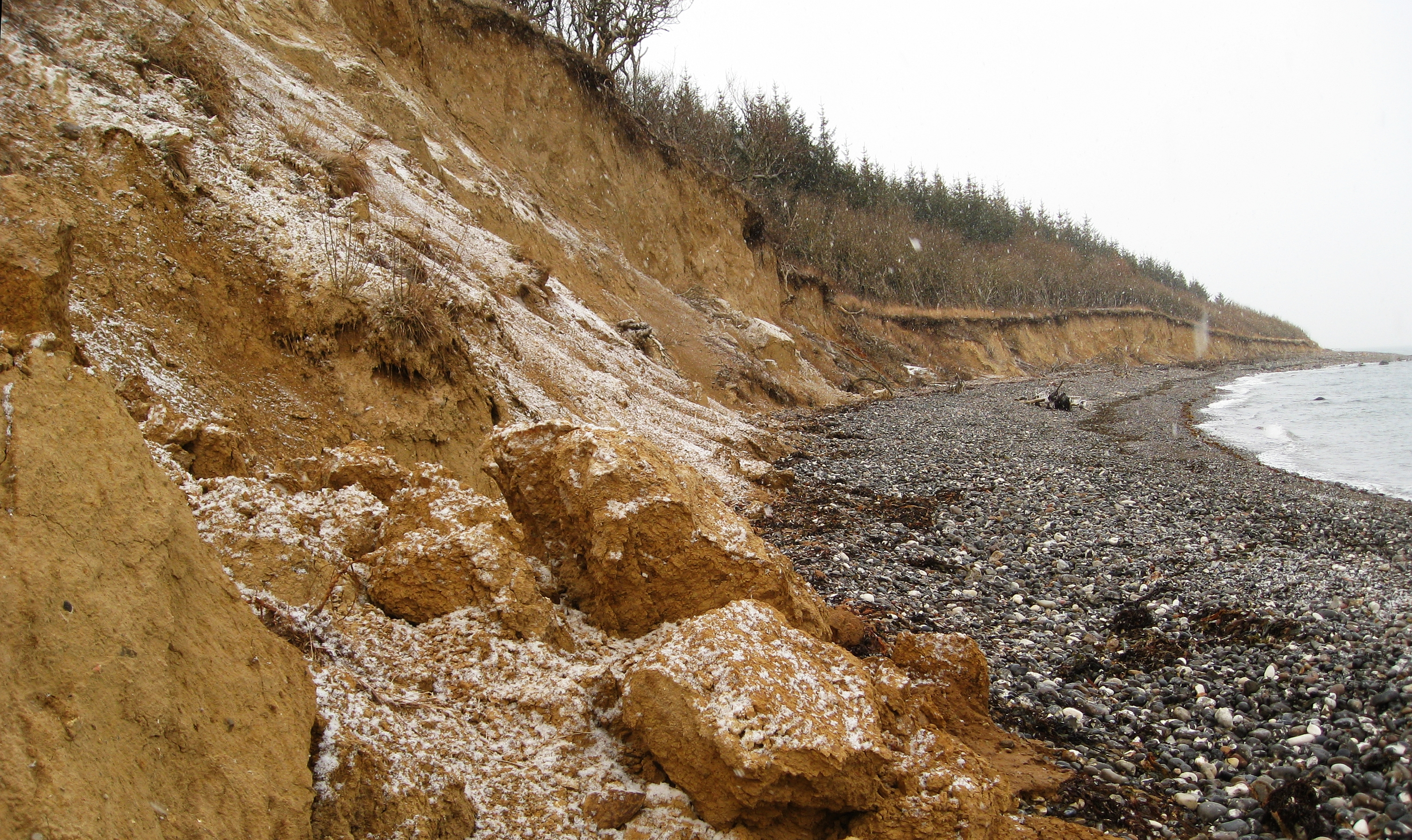
Coastal erosion at Glatved Beach by Helligkilde.

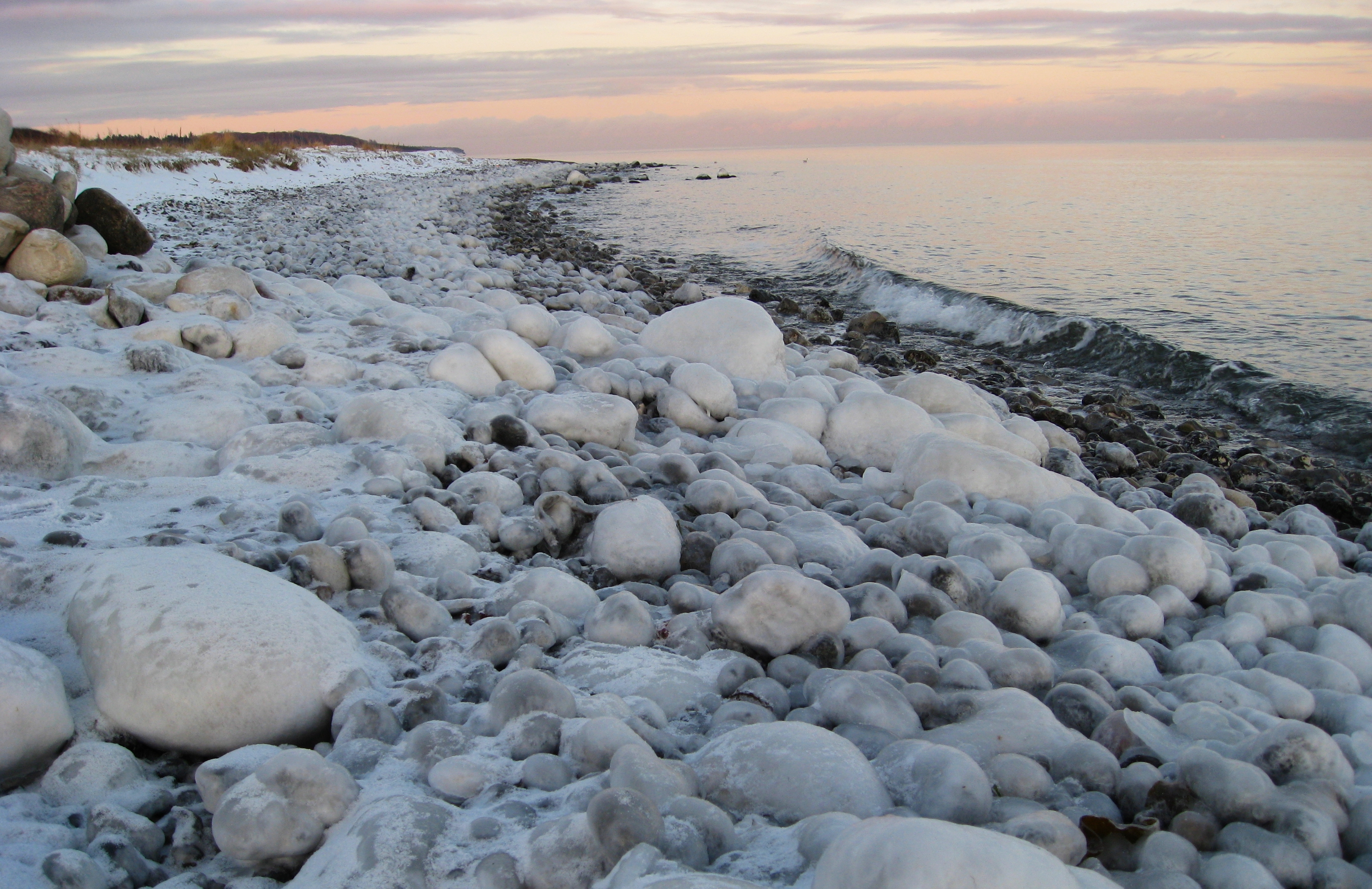
Glatved beach, iced over stony coast.

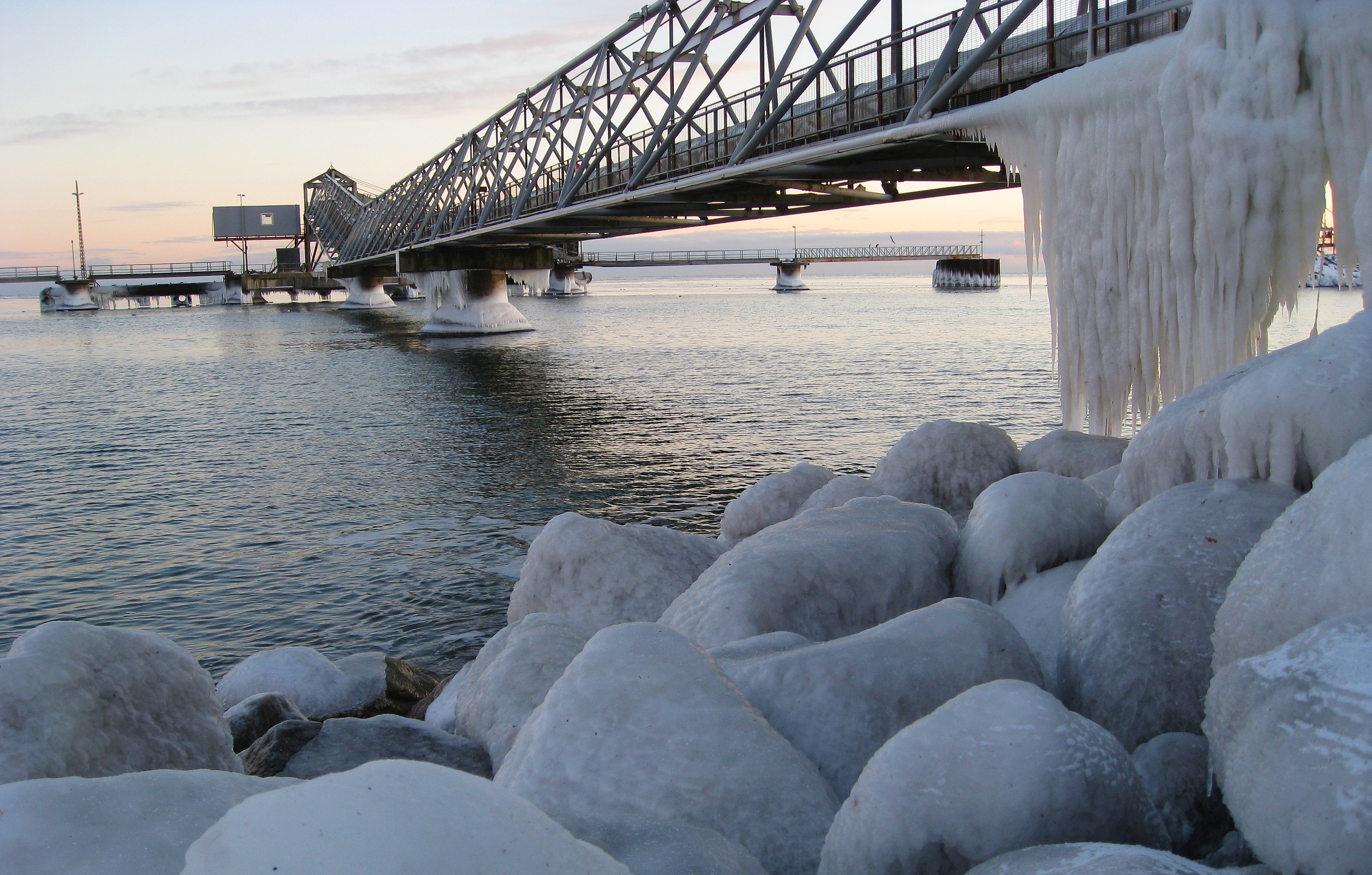
Iced over pier for embarkment of gravel.

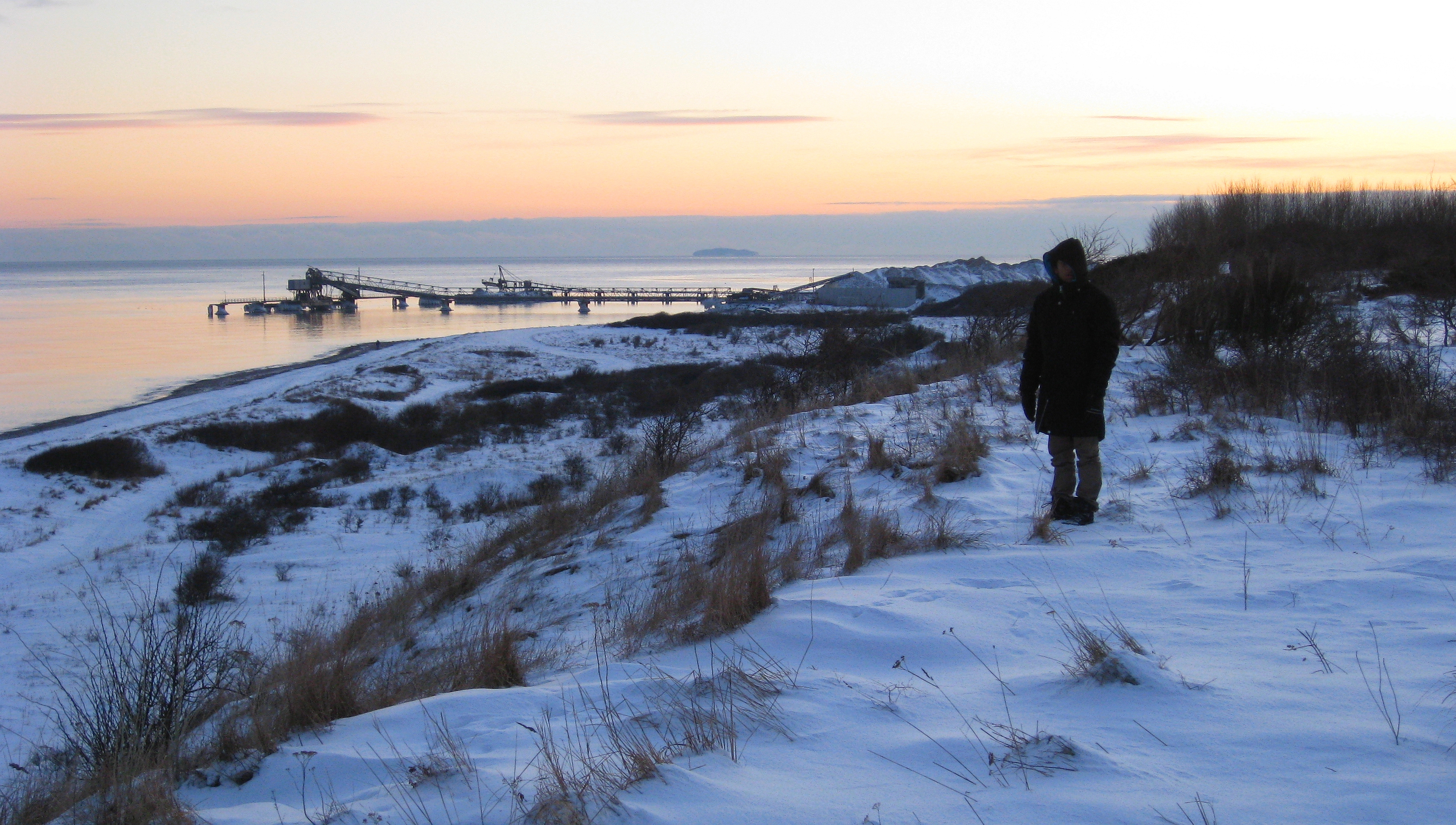
Direction south with embarkment pier at the south end of Glatved Beach.

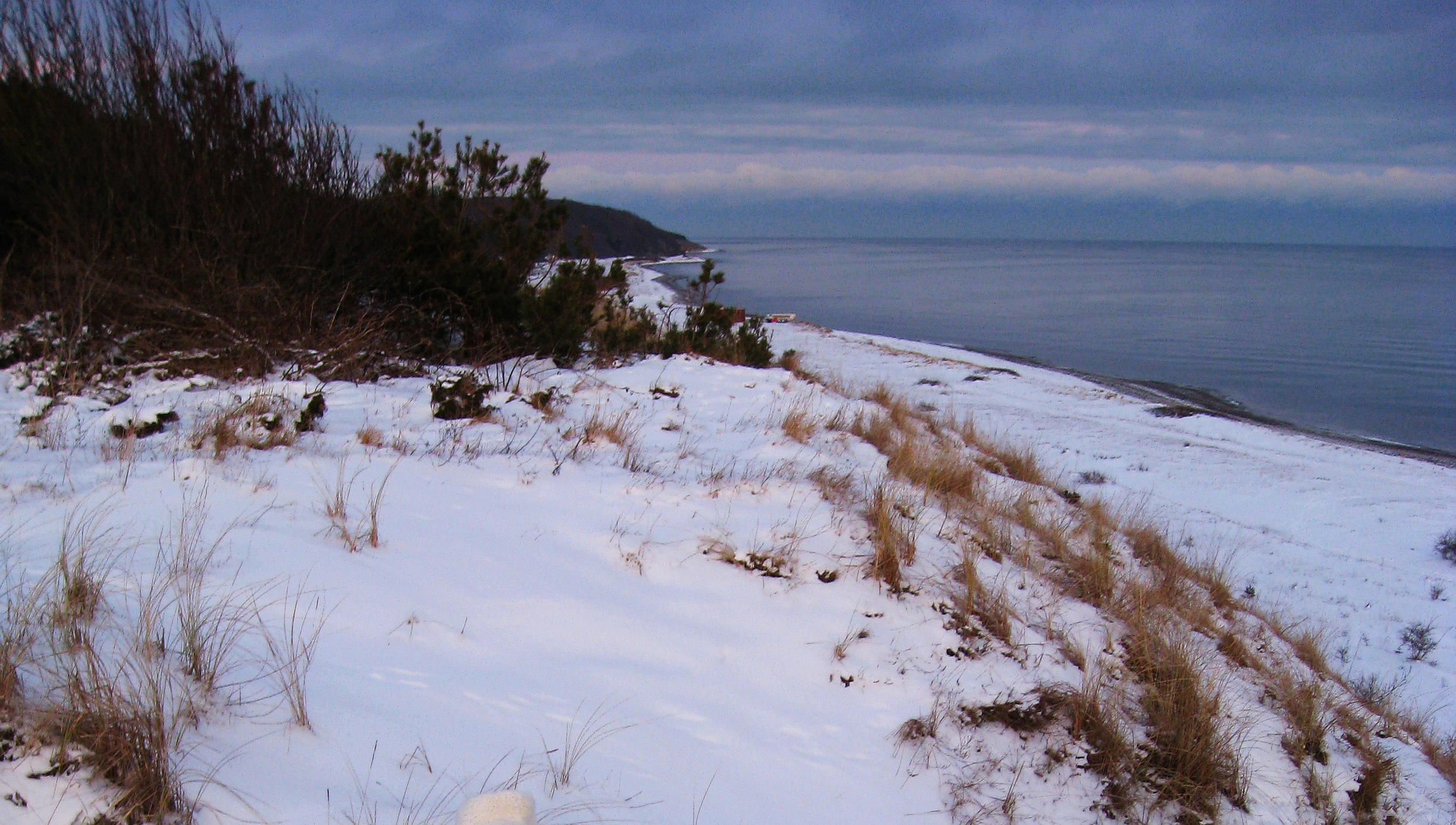
Direction north towards, Havknude, from the southern part of Glatved Beach.

== Sources ==
- Glatved lystfisker.dk. Angling forum. (in Danish)
- Glatved Strand Denmarks Beachguide (Djursland). (in Danish)
- Glatved Strand Fugle & natur. (in Danish)
- Glatved Strand Alpha Diving. Diving at Glatved beach. (in Danish)
- Glatved Strand Visit Denmark. Tourist site. (in Danish)
