= 2025 Norddjurs municipal election =

← 2021	18 November 2025	2029 →

All 27 seats to the Norddjurs municipal council 14 seats needed for a majority
- Turnout: 20,279 (67.7%) ▲1.4%
	First party	Second party	Third party
	V	A	F
Party	Venstre	Social Democrats	Green Left
Last election	5 seats, 19.5%	9 seats, 31.4%	3 seats, 8.4%
Seats won	8	7	3
Seat change	▲3	▼2	0
Popular vote	5,096	4,847	2,055
Percentage	25.5%	24.3%	10.3%
Swing	▲6.0%	▼7.1%	▲1.9%
	Fourth party	Fifth party	Sixth party
	C	I	Æ
Party	Conservatives	Liberal Alliance	Denmark Democrats
Last election	4 seats, 13.9%	3 seats, 9.2%	Did not stand
Seats won	2	2	2
Seat change	▼2	▼1	▲2
Popular vote	1,883	1,634	1,386
Percentage	9.4%	8.2%	6.9%
Swing	▼4.5%	▼1.0%	New
	Seventh party	Eighth party	Ninth party
	O	N	Ø
Party	Danish People's Party	Natur- og Velfærdslisten	Red-Green Alliance
Last election	1 seat, 4.2%	Did not stand	1 seat, 5.4%
Seats won	2	1	0
Seat change	▲1	▲1	▼1
Popular vote	1,281	1,020	481
Percentage	6.4%	5.1%	2.4%
Swing	▲2.2%	New	▼3.0%
Mayor before election
Kasper Bjerregaard
Venstre
Mayor after election
Kasper Bjerregaard
Venstre

The 2025 Norddjurs Municipal election was held on November 18, 2025, to elect the 27 members to sit in the regional council for the Norddjurs Municipal council, in the period of 2026 to 2029. Kasper Bjerregaard from Venstre, would secure re-election.

== Background ==
Following the 2021 election, Kasper Bjerregaard from Venstre became mayor for his first term. He is set to run for re-election.

== Electoral system ==
For elections to Danish municipalities, a number varying from 9 to 31 are chosen to be elected to the municipal council. The seats are then allocated using the D'Hondt method and a closed list proportional representation. Norddjurs Municipality had 27 seats in 2025.

== Electoral alliances ==
=== Electoral Alliance 1 ===
Party		Political alignment
A	Social Democrats	Centre-left
F	Green Left	Centre-left to Left-wing
N	Natur- og Velfærdslisten	Local politics
Ø	Red-Green Alliance	Left-wing to Far-Left

=== Electoral Alliance 2 ===
Party		Political alignment
C	Conservatives	Centre-right
I	Liberal Alliance	Centre-right to Right-wing
O	Danish People's Party	Right-wing to Far-right
V	Venstre	Centre-right
Æ	Denmark Democrats	Right-wing to Far-right

== Results by polling station ==
Division	A	C	F	I	J	M	N	O	V	Æ	Ø
Division	%	%	%	%	%	%	%	%	%	%	%
Kulturhuset Pavillonen	28.3	8.7	10.7	3.9	1.6	0.8	3.4	6.5	28.5	5.4	2.1
Anholt Skole	28.4	3.7	7.4	0.0	0.0	1.2	16.0	1.2	18.5	6.2	17.3
Kulturhuset Stationen	26.3	6.5	8.2	4.4	0.4	0.4	6.0	8.6	23.5	12.6	3.2
Grenaa Idrætscenter	32.3	6.4	10.0	3.2	1.4	0.8	3.5	7.1	24.6	6.9	4.0
Glesborg	16.4	10.9	14.9	3.5	0.2	0.4	11.6	6.0	27.0	7.1	1.9
Ørum Aktiv Center	15.6	18.0	8.9	3.2	0.4	0.8	7.4	6.8	26.1	10.4	2.5
Ørsted	15.4	4.1	9.5	28.2	0.3	0.5	5.9	5.4	22.4	6.7	1.7
Allingåbro	24.0	11.8	8.4	8.0	0.1	0.6	3.8	6.3	29.1	6.9	1.1
Auning	22.2	15.0	5.3	22.4	0.1	0.7	2.8	6.0	17.6	6.3	1.6
Vivild	17.8	7.0	19.1	4.8	0.2	0.4	6.9	4.5	32.0	5.5	1.8

== Results ==
Party		Votes	%	+/-	Seats	+/-
Norddjurs Municipality
V	Venstre	5,096	25.51	+5.99	8	+3
A	Social Democrats	4,847	24.27	-7.14	7	-2
F	Green Left	2,055	10.29	+1.94	3	0
C	Conservatives	1,883	9.43	-4.49	2	-2
I	Liberal Alliance	1,634	8.18	-1.02	2	-1
Æ	Denmark Democrats	1,386	6.94	New	2	New
O	Danish People's Party	1,281	6.41	+2.21	2	+1
N	Natur- og Velfærdslisten	1,020	5.11	New	1	New
Ø	Red-Green Alliance	481	2.41	-3.01	0	-1
J	Norddjurs Uden Filter	159	0.80	New	0	New
M	Moderates	131	0.66	New	0	New
Total		19,973	100	N/A	27	N/A
Invalid votes		78	0.26	+0.06		
Blank votes		228	0.76	+0.03		
Turnout		20,279	67.67	+1.42		
Source: valg.dk

== Opinion polls ==
Polling firm	Fieldwork date	Sample size	A	V	C	I	F	Ø	O	J	M	N	Æ	Others	Lead
Epinion	4 Sep - 13 Oct 2025	481	34.0	22.3	4.9	7.2	11.0	2.9	6.5	–	1.5	–	8.9	0.7	11.7
2024 european parliament election	9 Jun 2024		19.4	16.4	6.1	6.4	13.7	4.2	9.4	–	5.9	–	13.4	–	3.0
2022 general election	1 Nov 2022		34.8	12.0	3.1	9.8	5.2	3.2	2.8	–	5.9	–	12.9	–	21.9
2021 regional election	16 Nov 2021		43.1	18.5	9.2	3.2	5.6	4.2	5.7	–	–	–	–	–	24.6
2021 municipal election	16 Nov 2021		31.4 (9)	19.5 (5)	13.9 (4)	9.2 (3)	8.4 (3)	5.4 (1)	4.2 (1)	–	–	–	–	–	11.9
