= 2021 Norddjurs municipal election =

← 2017	16 November 2021	2025 →

All 27 seats to the Norddjurs Municipal Council 14 seats needed for a majority
- Turnout: 20,146 (66.3%) ▼2.7pp
	First party	Second party	Third party
	A	V	C
Party	Social Democrats	Venstre	Conservatives
Last election	11 seats, 41.0%	6 seats, 19.9%	2 seats, 6.6%
Seats won	9	5	4
Seat change	▼2	▼1	▲2
Popular vote	6,240	3,880	2,766
Percentage	31.4%	19.5%	13.9%
Swing	▼9.6%	▼0.4%	▲7.3%
	Fourth party	Fifth party	Sixth party
	I	F	Ø
Party	Liberal Alliance	Green Left	Red–Green Alliance
Last election	2 seats, 6.8%	2 seats, 6.5%	1 seat, 5.3%
Seats won	3	3	1
Seat change	▲1	▲1	0
Popular vote	1,829	1,659	1,077
Percentage	9.2%	8.4%	5.4%
Swing	▲2.4%	▲1.9%	▲0.1%
	Seventh party	Eighth party
	D	O
Party	New Right	Danish People's Party
Last election	Did Not Stand	3 seats, 10.0%
Seats won	1	1
Seat change	▲1	▼2
Popular vote	1,034	835
Percentage	5.2%	4.2%
Swing	New	▼5.8%
Mayor before election
Jan Petersen
Social Democrats
Mayor after election
Kasper Bjerregaard
Venstre

Since 2010, Jan Petersen from the Social Democrats had been mayor of Norddjurs Municipality. In all 3 elections from the 2009 Norddjurs municipal election and on, the Social Democrats had won 11 seats, with Venstre coming second with 6 seats. However, in this election, the Social Democrats would suffer a seat loss of 2. Venstre and Danish People's Party, from the traditional blue bloc, would lose 1 and 2 seats respectively. However, due to New Right and Liberal Alliance gaining 1 seat and the Conservatives gaining 2 seats, the traditional blue bloc had a majority for the first time since the creation of Norddjurs Municipality. This resulted in Kasper Bjerregaard from Venstre becoming mayor.

== Electoral system ==
For elections to Danish municipalities, a number varying from 9 to 31 are chosen to be elected to the municipal council. The seats are then allocated using the D'Hondt method and a closed list proportional representation. Norddjurs Municipality had 27 seats in 2021

Unlike in Danish General Elections, in elections to municipal councils, electoral alliances are allowed.

== Electoral alliances ==
=== Electoral Alliance 1 ===
Party		Political alignment
D	New Right	Right-wing to Far-right
I	Liberal Alliance	Centre-right to Right-wing

=== Electoral Alliance 2 ===
Party		Political alignment
F	Green Left	Centre-left to Left-wing
Ø	Red–Green Alliance	Left-wing to Far-Left

=== Electoral Alliance 3 ===
Party		Political alignment
O	Danish People's Party	Right-wing to Far-right
V	Venstre	Centre-right

== Results by polling station ==
J = Frie Danske

Division	A	B	C	D	F	I	J	O	V	Ø
Division	%	%	%	%	%	%	%	%	%	%
Kulturhuset Pavillonen	34.0	3.4	17.0	5.7	8.5	3.0	0.0	4.2	20.0	4.2
Anholt Skole	28.7	2.1	13.8	4.3	17.0	0.0	0.0	3.2	5.3	25.5
Kulturhuset Stationen	32.9	2.6	12.9	7.0	6.0	2.6	0.1	8.2	21.9	5.7
Grenaa Idrætscenter	38.3	3.4	14.7	5.7	7.5	2.8	0.1	5.5	16.4	5.5
Glesborg	27.5	3.6	18.4	3.8	11.2	3.3	0.2	3.6	19.6	8.8
Ørum	21.5	3.3	29.4	4.9	7.8	4.4	0.1	4.1	19.3	5.1
Ørsted	28.6	1.2	7.1	6.3	7.7	15.2	0.1	3.4	22.1	8.3
Allingåbro	34.4	1.0	7.3	5.2	7.4	18.9	0.0	3.4	18.6	3.7
Auning	27.5	1.1	6.0	3.6	5.3	35.7	0.2	2.5	15.2	2.8
Vivild	21.6	1.1	6.4	4.1	16.1	9.6	0.0	2.0	33.1	6.0

== Results ==
Party		Votes	%	+/-	Seats	+/-
Norddjurs Municipality
A	Social Democrats	6,240	31.41	-9.55	9	-2
V	Venstre	3,880	19.53	-0.33	5	-1
C	Conservatives	2,766	13.92	+7.36	4	+2
I	Liberal Alliance	1,829	9.21	+2.42	3	+1
F	Green Left	1,659	8.35	+1.82	3	+1
Ø	Red-Green Alliance	1,077	5.42	+0.15	1	0
D	New Right	1,034	5.20	New	1	New
O	Danish People's Party	835	4.20	-5.77	1	-2
B	Social Liberals	528	2.66	+1.56	0	0
J	Frie Danske	20	0.10	New	0	New
Total		19,868	100	N/A	27	N/A
Invalid votes		61	0.20	-0.01		
Blank votes		217	0.71	+0.02		
Turnout		20,146	66.25	-2.75		
Source: valg.dk
