= Leif Lahn Jensen =

Danish politician

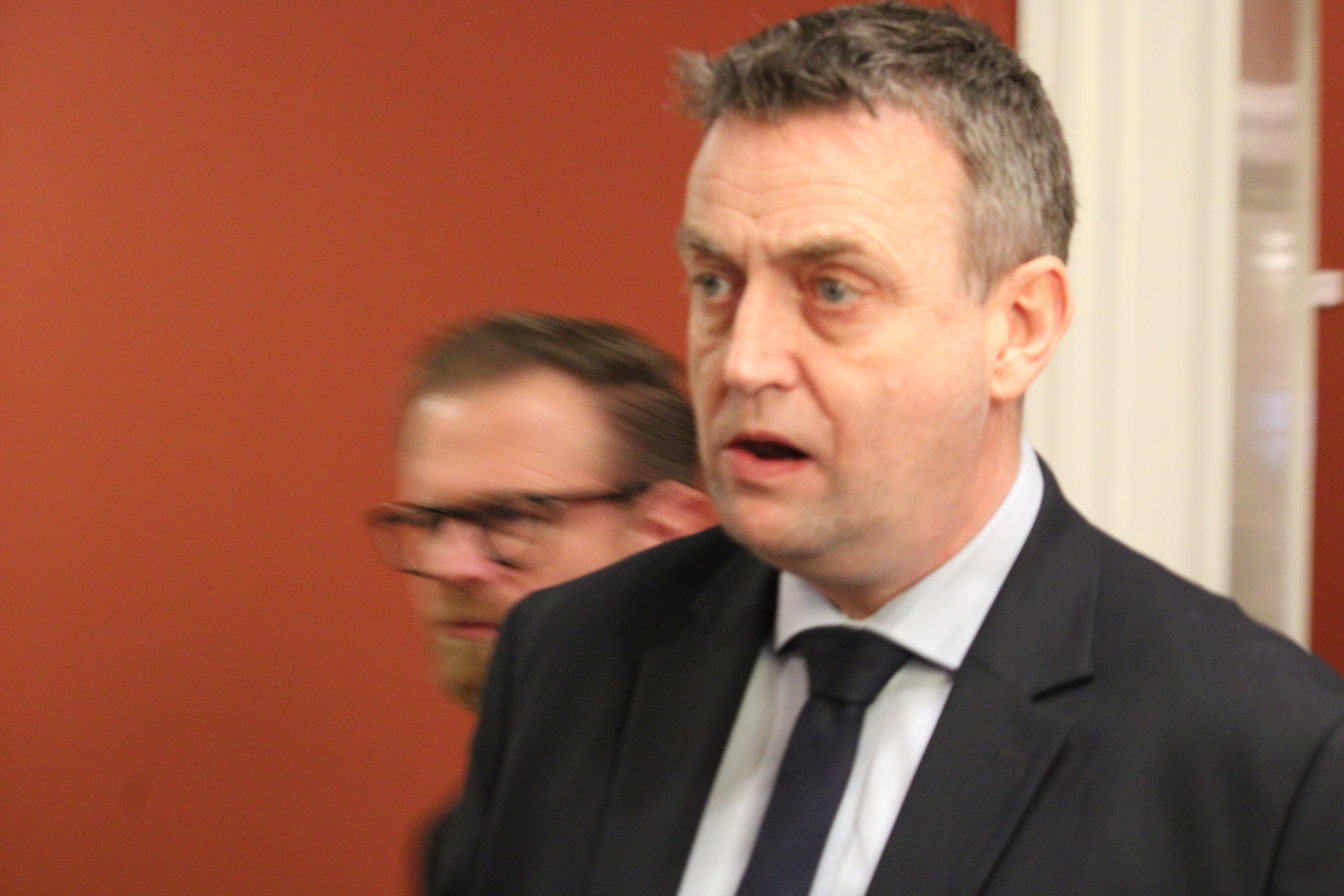
- Lahn Jensen in 2025

Member of the Folketing
- Incumbent
- Assumed office 13 November 2007
- Constituency: East Jutland

Personal details
- Born: 29 June 1967 (age 58) Grenaa, Denmark
- Party: Social Democrats

Leif Lahn Jensen (born 29 June 1967) is a Danish politician who is a member of the Folketing for the Social Democrats. He was elected into parliament at the 2007 Danish general election.

== Political career ==
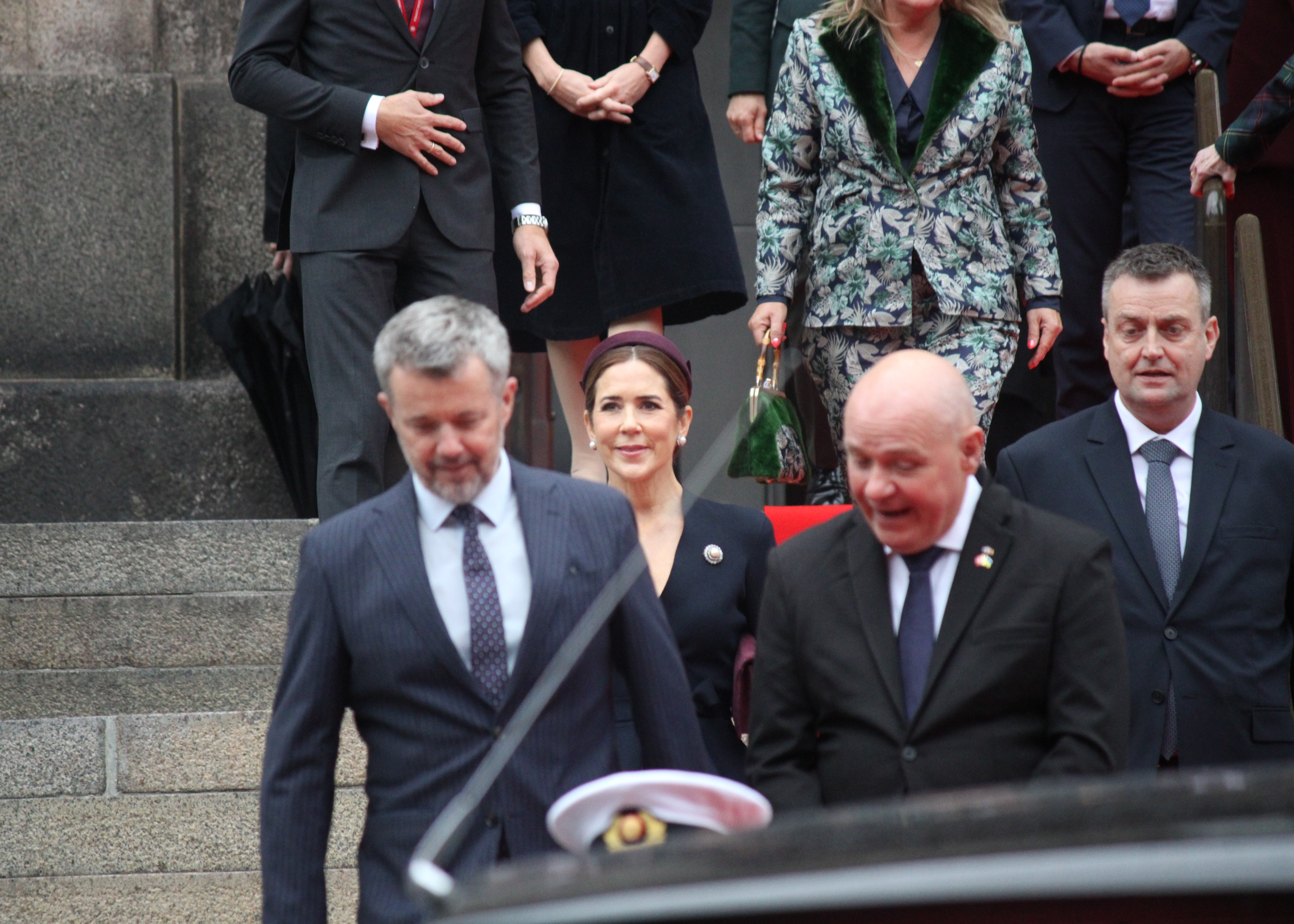
Lahn Jensen with the king and queen at the 2025 opening of parliament

Jensen was a member of the municipal council in Grenaa Municipality from 2002 to 2006. In 2007 the municipality was merged with the municipalities of Nørre Djurs, Rougsø and part of Sønderhald to form Norddjurs Municipality. Jensen sat in this municipal council from 2006 to 2007.

Jensen was elected to parliament in the 2007 election, and reelected in the 2011, 2015 and 2019 elections.
