= Albøge Parish =

Parish in Norddjurs Municipality, Denmark

Albøge Parish Albøge Sogn
- Parish
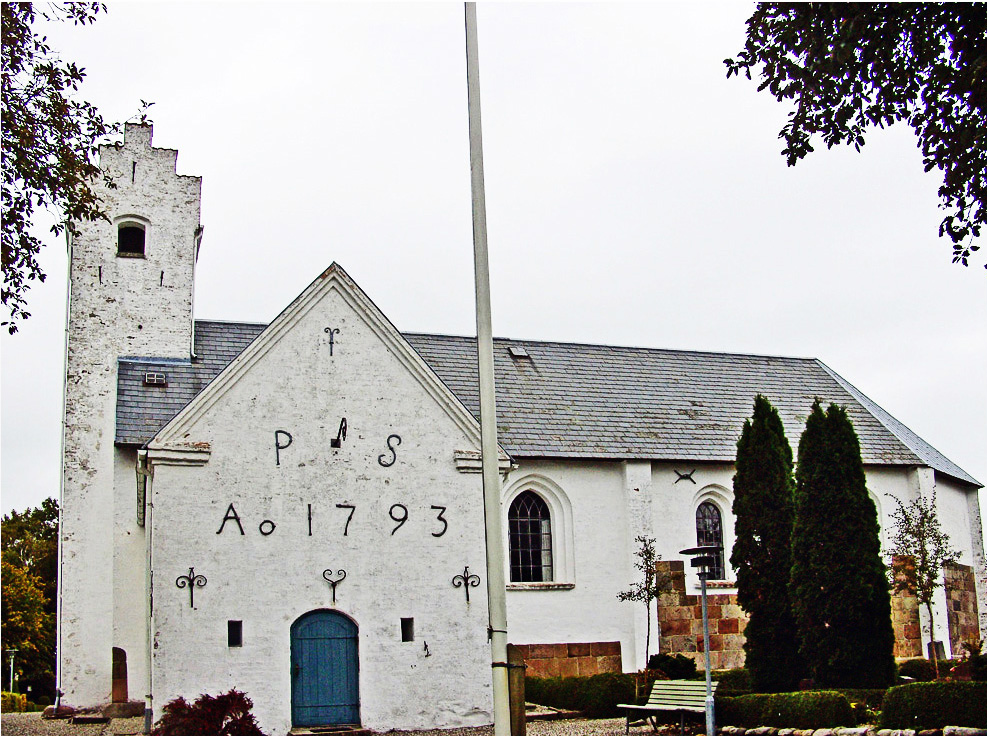
- Albøge Church
- Interactive map of Albøge Parish
- Coordinates: 56°21′43″N 10°42′18″E
- Country: Denmark
- Region: Central Denmark
- Municipality: Norddjurs Municipality
- Diocese: Diocese of Aarhus

Population (2004)
  - Total: 338
- Parish number: 8171

Albøge Parish was a parish in Norddjurs Municipality, on Djursland peninsula in Denmark. Until the 1970 Danish Municipal Reform, it was a part of the Djurs Sønder Herred estate in former Randers County. In 2021, it was merged with Lyngby Parish into Lyngby-Albøge Parish.

The following settlements and localities are found within Albøge Parish:

- Albøge
- Hallendrup
- Kærby
- Søby
