= Bønnerup Strand =

- Town
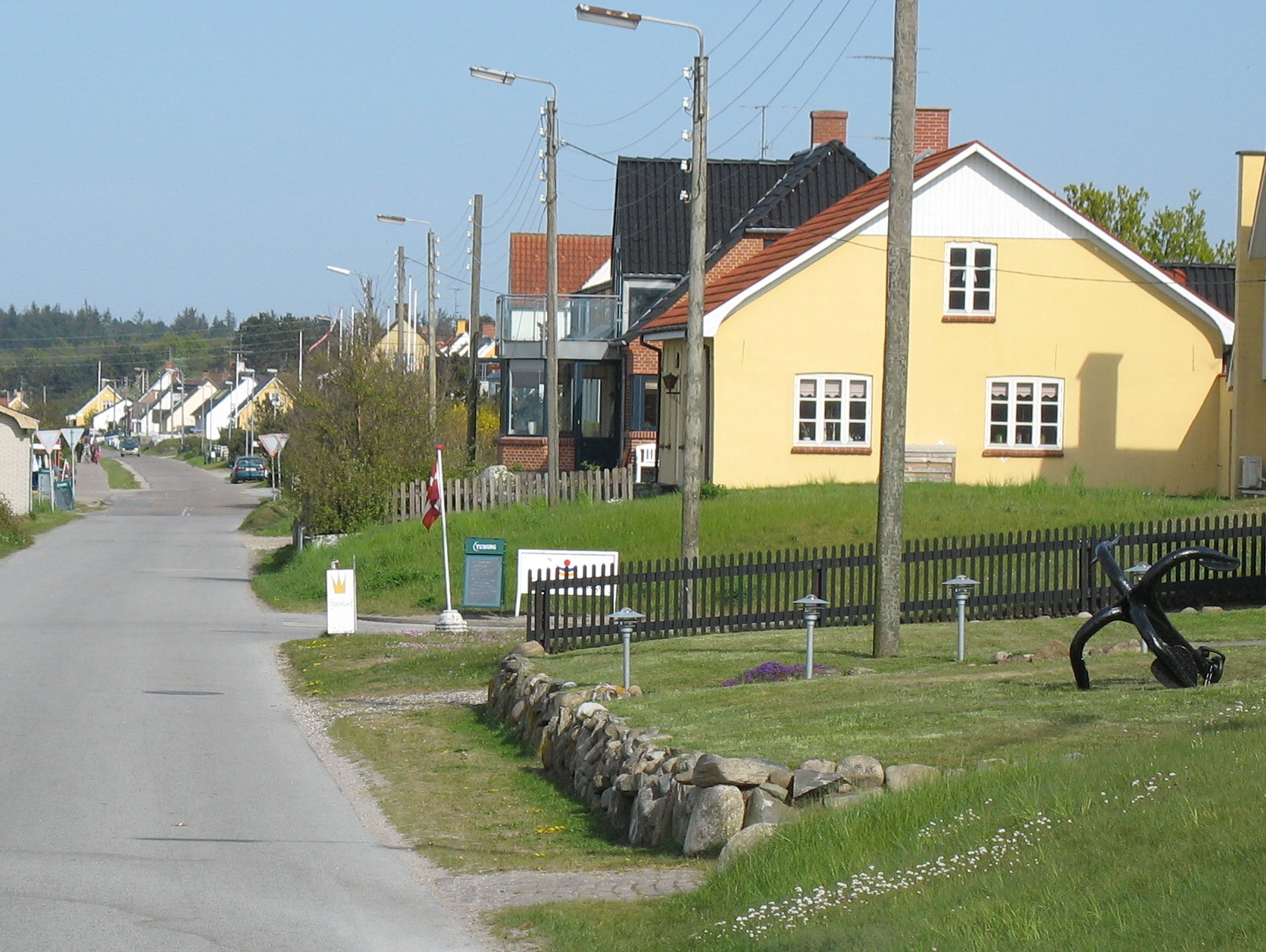
- The coastal road in Bønnerup Strand

- Location within Denmark Location within Central Denmark Region
- Coordinates: 56°31′45″N 10°42′46″E
- Country: Denmark
- Region: Central Denmark (Midtjylland)
- Municipality: Norddjurs

Population (2026)
  - Total: 648
- Time zone: UTC+1 (Central European Time)
  - Summer (DST): UTC+2 (Central European Summer Time)
- Website: www.boennerup.dk

Bønnerup Strand (lit.: Bønnerup Beach) is a village in Norddjurs Municipality, Denmark.

Bønnerup Strand is a fishing village, sprawling inland from the harbour. It is situated at the large shallow Bay of Aalborg in the Kattegat sea. The beach and coast east and west of Bønnerup Strand is broad, sandy, very shallow and considered child friendly. It attracts people and tourists for recreational activities in the summer. The surrounding area (simply called Bønnerup) has a large concentration of summer houses and rentals, with many situated in the hills overlooking the beach.

== History ==
The village of Bønnerup strand is only a little more than a hundred years old, initiated when 4-5 families settled here as fishermen. The town has sprawled inland since then. Some of the original old houses are still around and a large part of the inhabitants are descendants of the first settling families.

The oldest building in Bønnerup was the mill of Treå Mølle. It was mentioned as early as 1348 and served as a grain mill for local farmers in the area. The original mill burned to the ground in 1859, but was rebuilt in 1860. In 1892, the milling was discontinued and the buildings were rebuilt to house a bakery and ordinary residence.

Strandhuset (lit.:The Beach-house) at the beach, was built in 1776 by the landlord of nearby Meilgård Castle. There is some doubt of its original function, but in the Napoleonic Wars it found use as a gunpowder magazine, serving the adjacent battery of Treå Mølle Batterie. Since then, the house has been known as Krudthuset by the locals. from 1845 to around 1890 the house served as poorhouse and home for the disabled. It later served as a shop and a guesthouse.

The coastal military battery of Treå Mølle Batterie, at the mouth of the Treå stream was the only battery in all of Djursland, actually involved in combat during the Napoleonic Wars. Apart from Krudthuset, some later trenches and lookouts from World War II, can also be seen here.

== The harbour ==
The harbour (Danish: Bønnerup Havn) is the only large harbour on the coast of Northern Djursland. It has been modernized and expanded in recent decades and includes a marina since 1999 and a marine wind farm of 7 turbines since 1997. Commercial fishing still plays an important part of the harbour and the early morning fish markets supply fresh seafood to traders from afar, as well as locals and random tourists. The local fishing association is currently the largest sponsor in Bønnerup Strand.

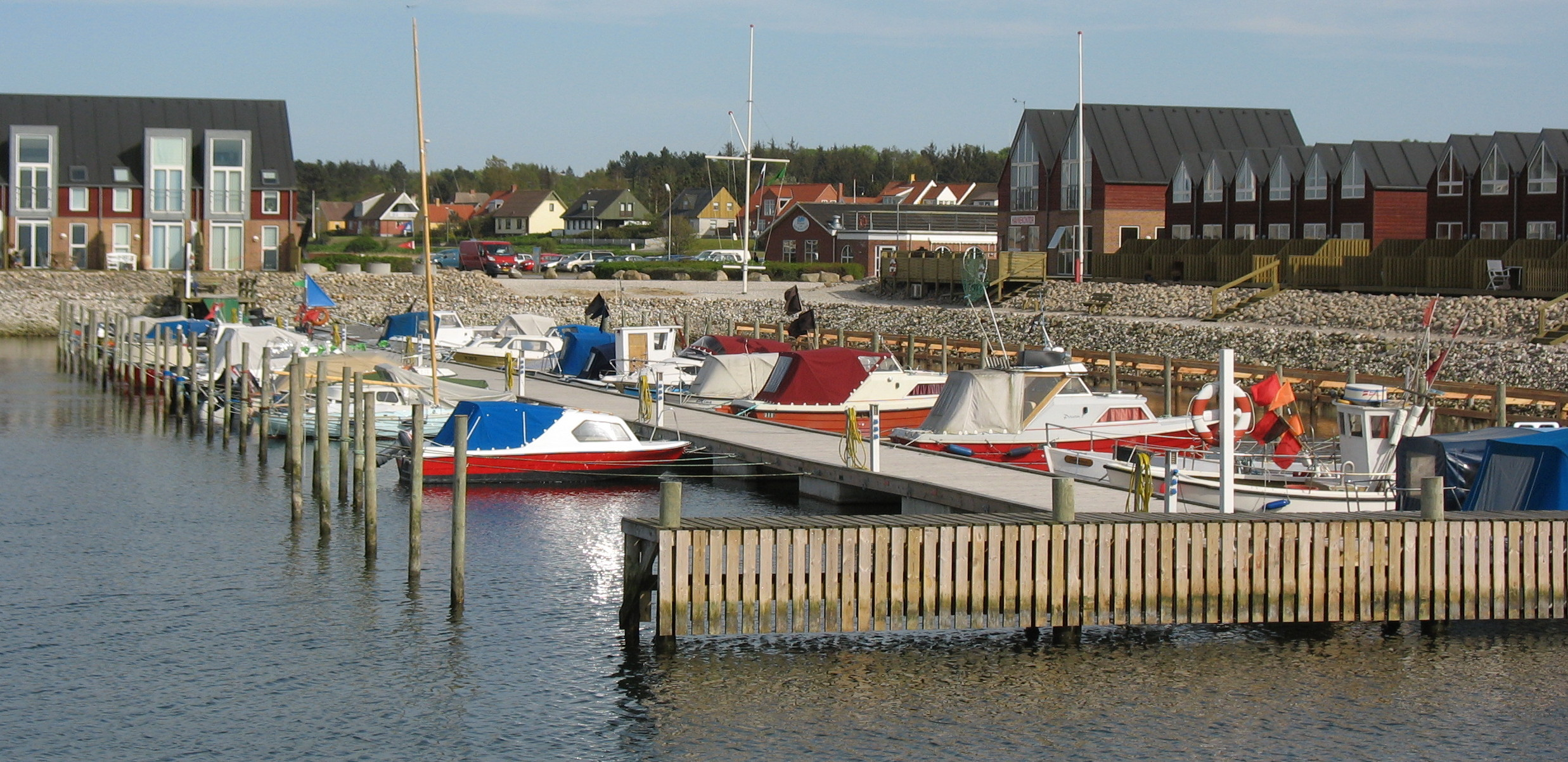
The marina at the harbour

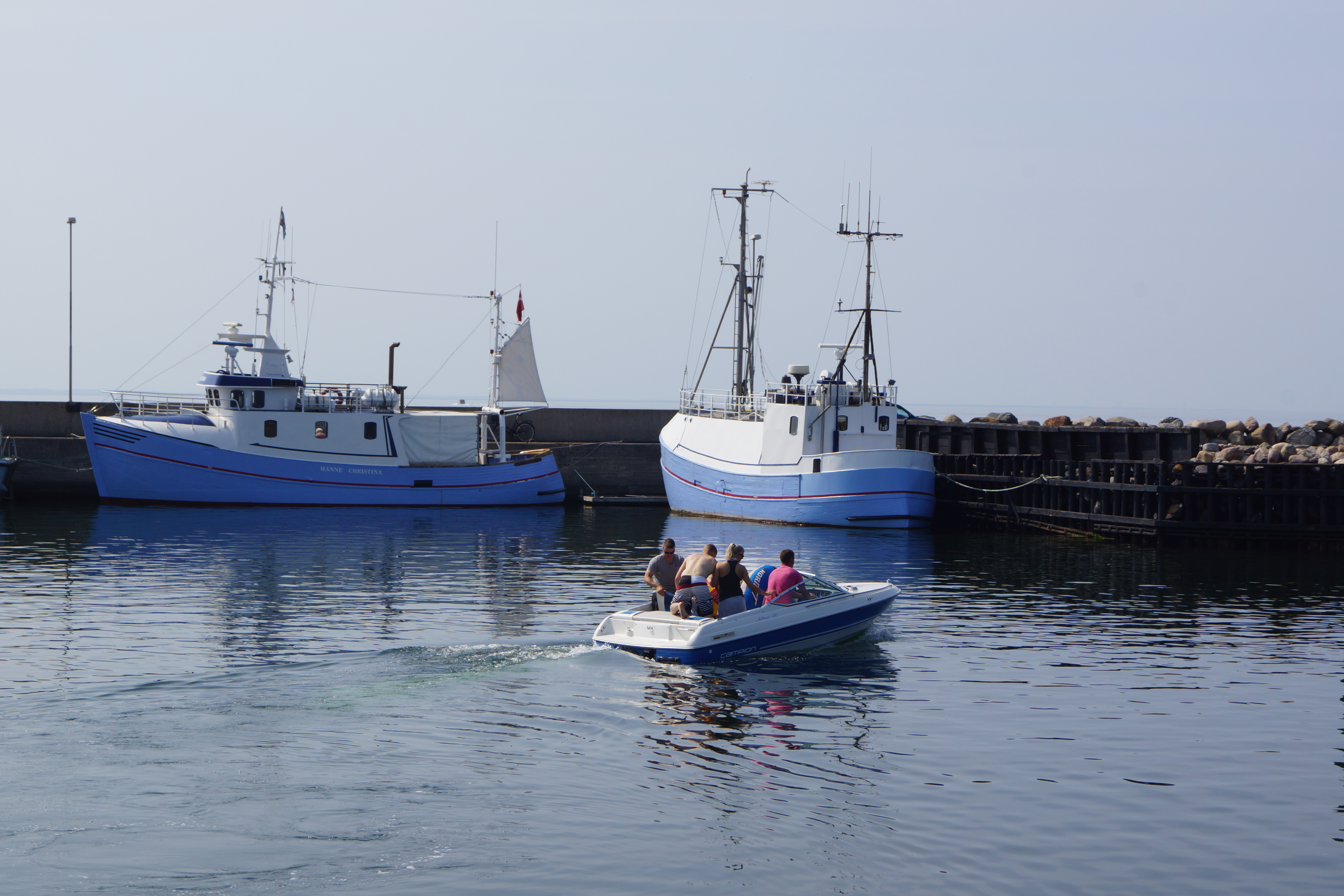
Professional fishing boats at the harbour

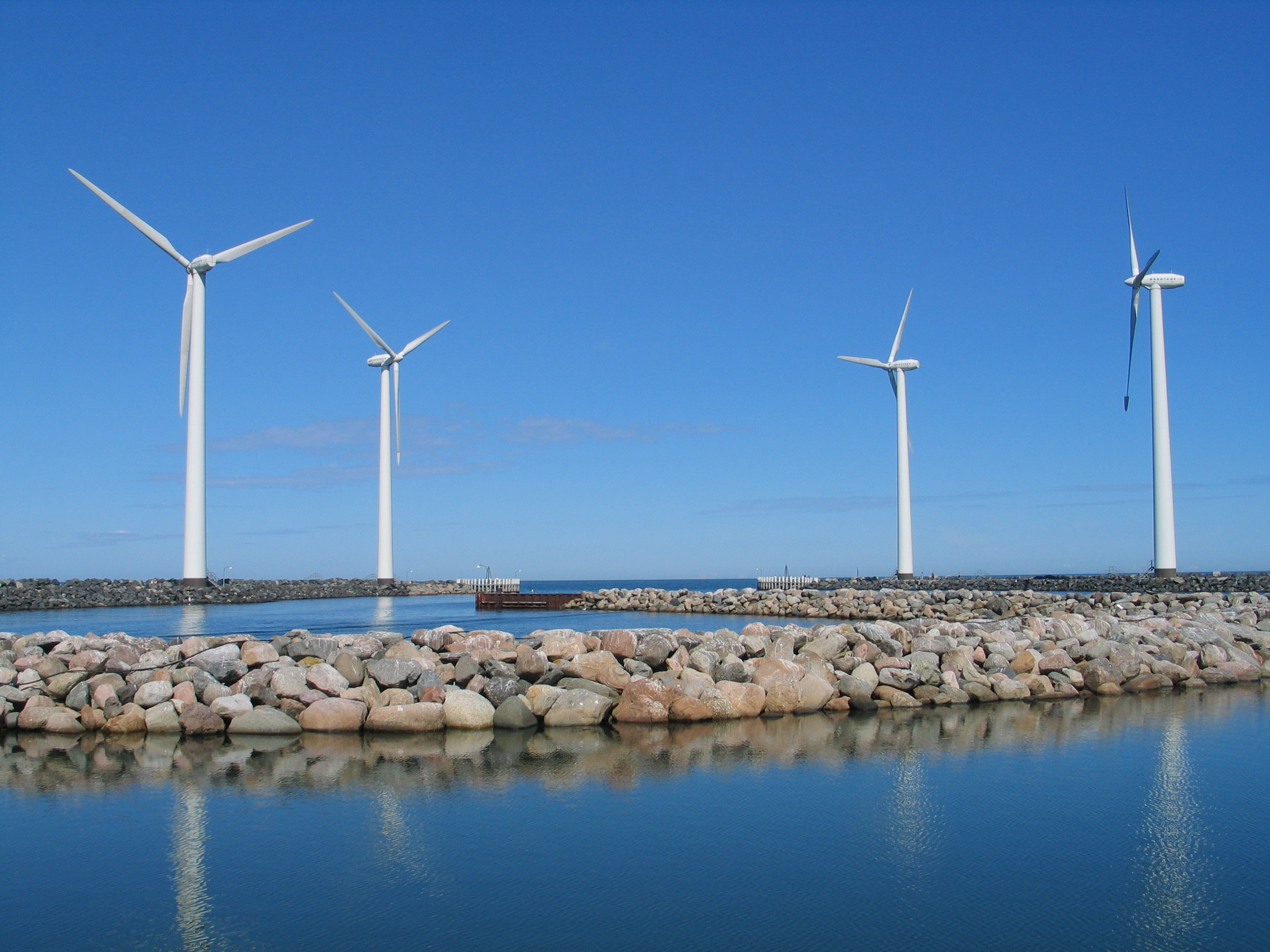
The wind farm at Bønnerup Strand

== Surroundings and local attractions ==
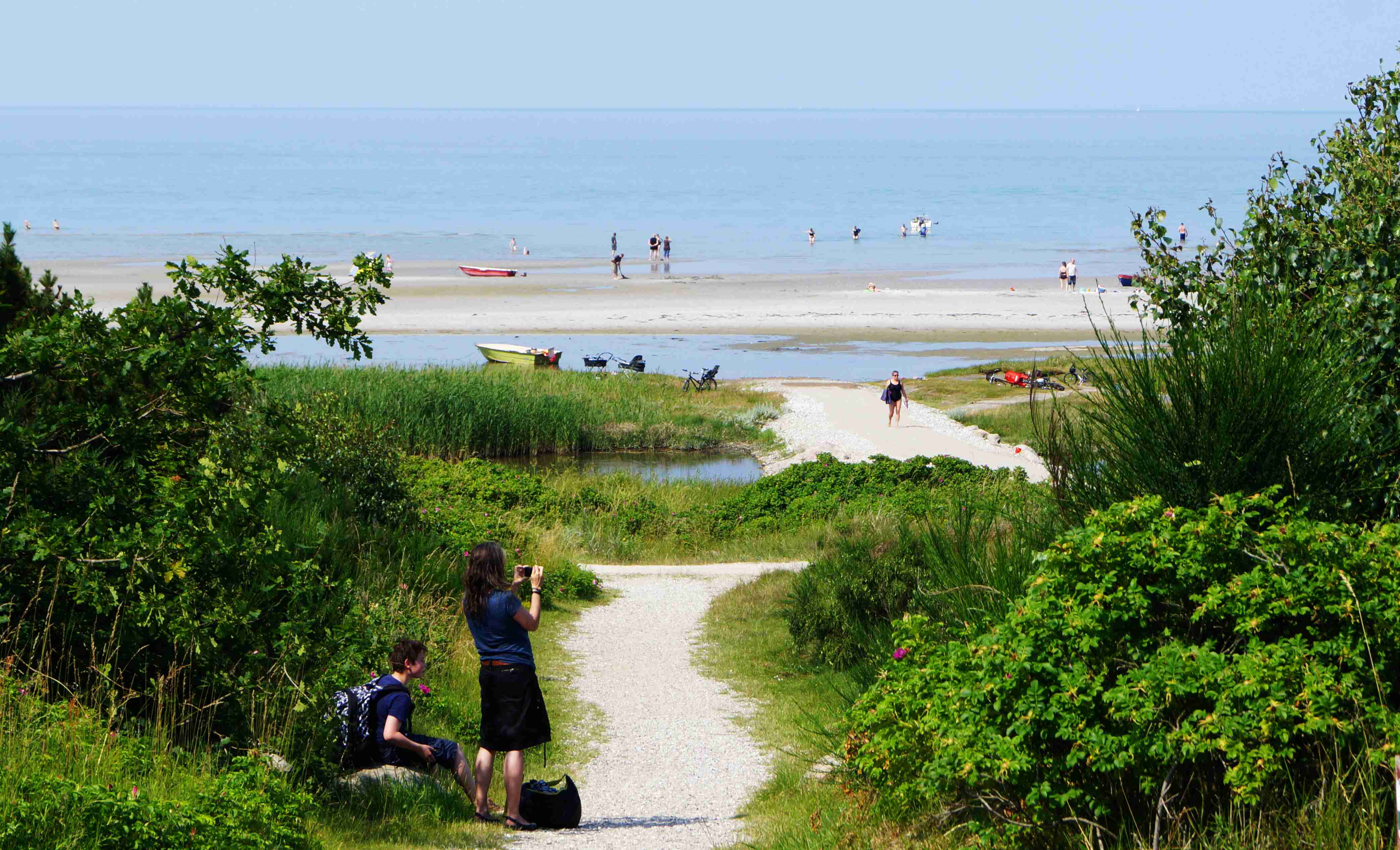
Activities at the beach

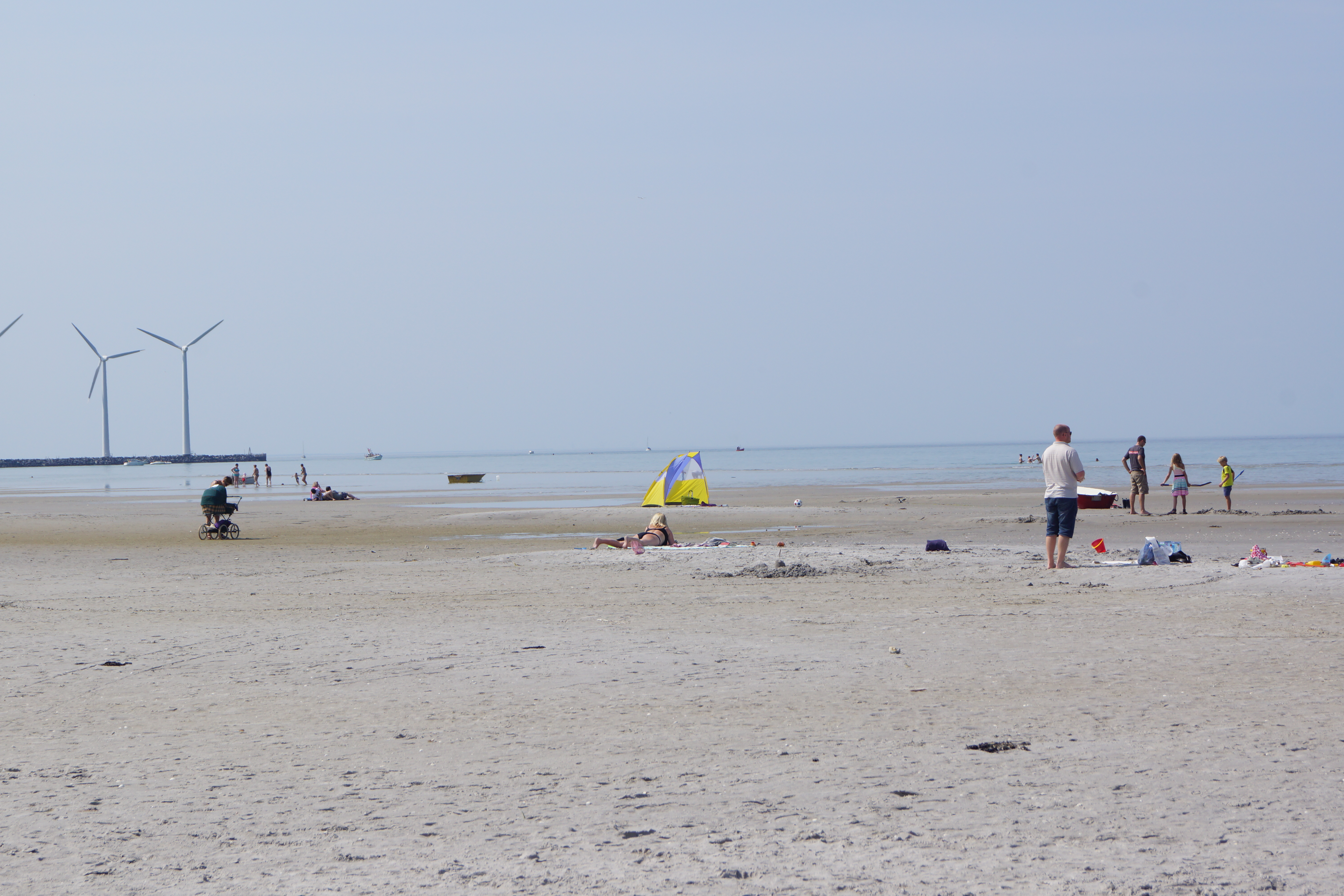
The beach is broad, sandy and the water is very shallow.

Apart from the easy access to the sea, Bønnerup Strand is situated near woodlands and natural sites.

There are several bicycle roads and hiking trails around Bønnerup Strand. Nordjurs Municipality has recently finished a bicycle road from the harbour front to the east along the coast. The road leads through a beautiful nature reserve presenting woodlands and wetlands with reed beds to the small coastal village of Gjerrild Nordstrand. Here the road turns south inland past Sostrup Castle and the nunnery of Sostrup Kloster in the village of Gjerrild. This first part of the trail also forms part of the national cycling route 5, known as Østkystruten (lit.:the east-coast-route). From Gjerrild the cycling road leads northwest through the forest of Emmedsbo and back to the marina at Bønnerup Strand. At Bønnerup Strand, there is also a gravelled coastal route leading west to the small coastal village of Fjellerup, the old Meilgård Castle in the southwest and back.

The international long distance North Sea Trail for hiking, passes through Bønnerup Strand and further west towards Fjellerup.

Bus lines at the harbour connects with Aarhus, Randers, Grenaa and the amusement park of Djurs Sommerland. The area attracts many tourists in the summer months and some regional attractions includes:

- Djurs Sommerland/ Djurs Sommerland - outdoor amusement park
- Randers Regnskov/ Randers Rain Forest – zoo in greenhouses
- Kattegatcentret – aquarium, fish, (large) sharks, seals
- Fjord- og Kystcentret/ visit center at Randers Fjord – exhibitions, guided tours, etc.
- Dansk Motor- og Maskinsamling – The Engine Collection, Scandinavia's largest stationary engine collection
- Landbrugsmuseet, Gl. Estrup/ The Agriculture Museum at Gl. Estrup - Agricultural Museum including extensive gardens with traditional vegetables and crops
- Herregårdsmuseet Gl. Estrup/ The Manor Museum, Gl. Estrup
- Munkholm Zoo – zoo aimed at families with small children
- Ree Park – a safari park with exotic animals in a hilly countryside.
- Skandinavisk Dyrepark (Scandinavian Wildlife Park) – zoo, Nordic animals
- Mols Bjerge National Park
- Glasmuseet – Contemporary glass museum
- Fregatten Jylland – Frigate Jutland – One of the world's largest wooden warships
- Kalø Castle – a 700-year-old ruined castle on a peninsula
- Kalø Veteranbiltræf/ Kaloe Veteran Car Meet, Tuesdays

== Sources ==
- Visit Denmark: Bønnerup. Tourist information.
