= Rougsø Municipality =

Former municipality in Denmark

Coordinates: 56°27′52″N 10°20′02″E

Until 1 January 2007 Rougsø municipality was a municipality (Danish, kommune) in the former Aarhus County on the east coast of the Jutland peninsula in central Denmark. It covered an area of 224 km^{2}, and had a total population of 8,078 (2005). Its last mayor was Torben Jensen. The site of its municipal council was Allingåbro. Other towns in the municipality were Gjesing, Holbæk, Nørager, Vivild, and Ørsted.

Rougsø municipality ceased to exist due to Kommunalreformen ("The Municipality Reform" of 2007). It was combined with existing Nørre Djurs and Grenaa municipalities, along with the eastern part of Sønderhald municipality to form the new Norddjurs municipality. This created a municipality with an area of 661 km^{2} and a total population of 34,382 (2005). The new municipality belongs to Region Midtjylland ("Mid-Jutland Region").
