= Sostrup Castle =

Castle in Norddjurs Municipality, Denmark

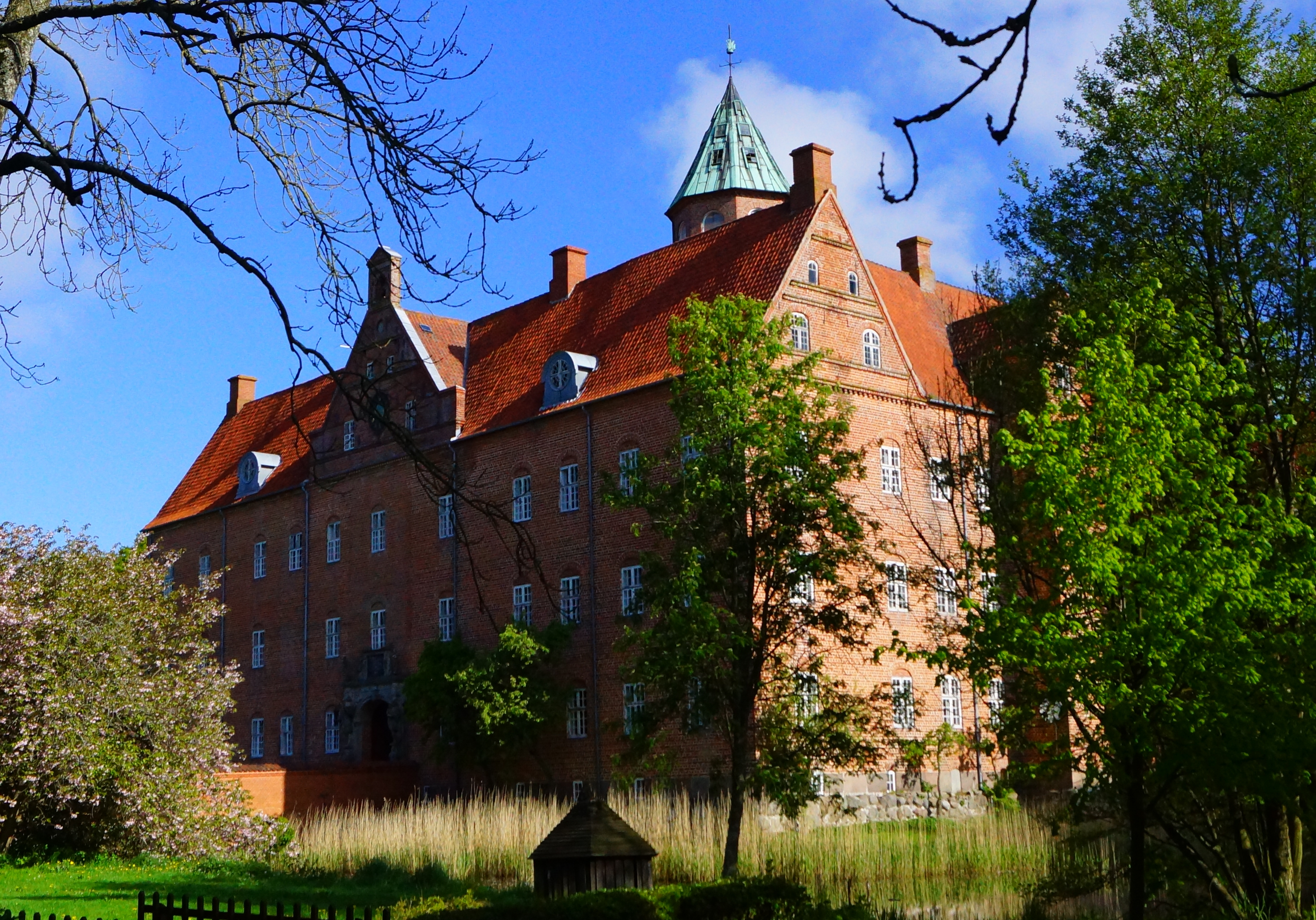
- South view of Sostrup Castle in Denmark.

General information
- Architectural style: Renaissance
- Location: Norddjurs Municipality, Denmark
- Coordinates: 56°29′45″N 10°49′25″E
- Construction started: 1599
- Completed: 1606
- Owner: Kirsten B. Swift

Sostrup Castle is a Danish castle in Gjerrild parish, once in Djurs Nørre Herred, now in Norddjurs Municipality, Denmark. The main building was begun in 1599 and completed in 1606.

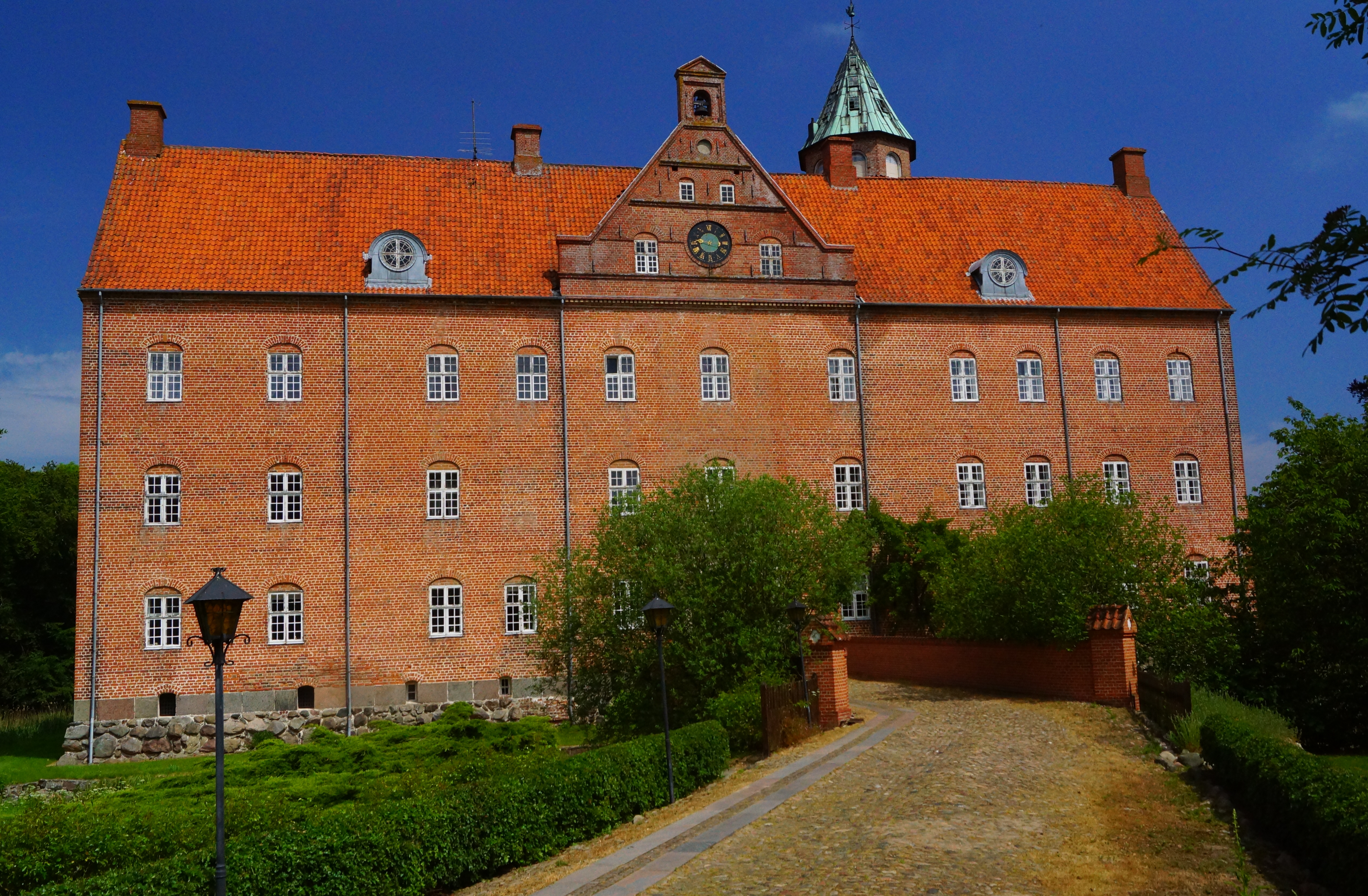
Front of main building.

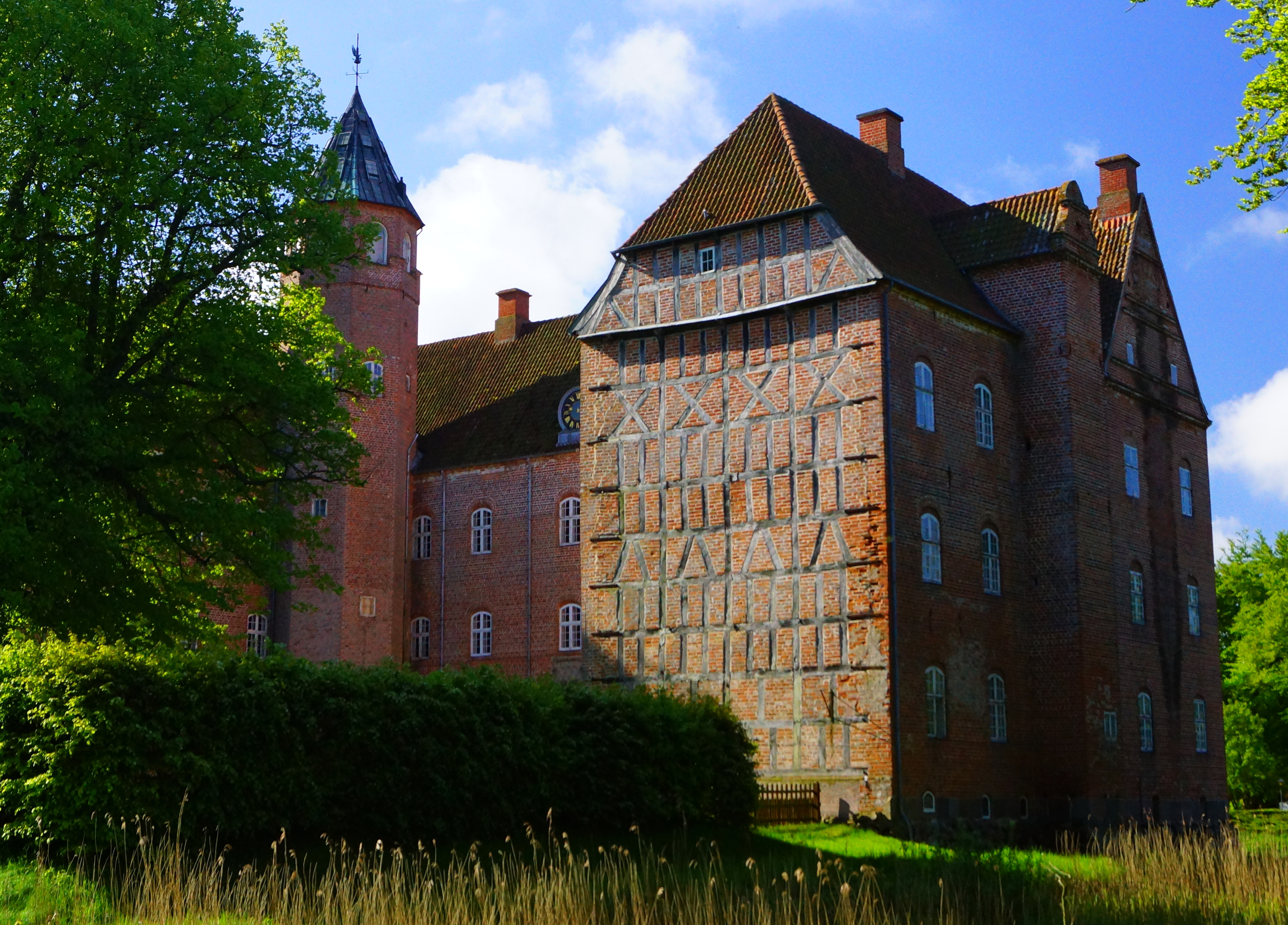
Rear - temporary timber framed gable that became permanent, as a fourth wing was never built

The castle occupies 20 hectares, with 239.8 hectares of adjacent farm and woodland. The castle is located on a rectangular bank west of a meadow and former seabed connected to the sea between Denmark and Sweden. Extensive farm and employees' quarters are situated west of the castle.

Possibly a farm where Sostrup Castle now lies was owned by King Christopher II, who pawned "Svorttorp" in 1327. The estate is first mentioned in writing in 1388, when Jens Lagesen Udsen was listed as owner, according to a parchment letter now kept in Sostrup's vault. In 1725 Sostrup became the manor house in the County of Scheel, which bore the name of Scheel until the county was wound up in 1823. In 1829 Jacob von Benzon took over the place, which became an entailed estate under the name Benzon. From 1944 the place was once again called "Sostrup".

From 1960 the castle was a monastery with retreat and boarding activities. The Cistercian order of nuns built a church placed south-west of the castle. According to the Catholic bishop's office, the plan was to restore the castle and to some extent use it for creative activities.

After the monastery was closed in 2012, Sostrup was sold on 1 June 2014 to sister and brother Kirsten and Anders Bundgaard. They are restoring the castle and plan to open a conference centre, rentable rooms and a restaurant, scheduled for completion in 2015. Currently the castle's largest room can accommodate 60, but the owners have sought permission to open a larger great hall.

== Sostrup owners ==
- (before 1327) Crown land
- (1330–1388) Svend Udsen
- (1388–1410) Jens Lagesen Udsen
- (1410–1430) Gertrud Svendsdatter Udsen married, in 1410, (1) to Jens Ovesen Kaas
- (1430–1464) Gertrud Svendsdatter Udsen married, in 1430, (2) to Niels Munk
- (1464–1485) Tom Jensen Kaas / Anders Nielsen Munk
- (1485–1504) Anders Nielsen Munk
- (1504–1541) Gertrud Andersdatter Munk married, in 1530, to Jens Hvas
- (1541–1565) Christen Jensen Hvas
- (1565–1576) Jørgen Gundesen
- (1576–1579) Inger Gundesdatter
- (1579–1586) Jens Mikkelsen Hvas
- (1586–1599) Jacob Seefeld
- (1599–1612) Sophie Bille married, in 1608, Hans Jacobsen Seefeld
- (1612–1631) Jørgen Christensen Skeel, Field marshal of Danish army
- (1631–1640) Jytte Eskesdatter Brock married Skeel
- (1640–1688) Christen Jørgensen Skeel
- (1688–1695) Jørgen Christensen Skeel (1656-1695)
- (1695–1731) Christen Jørgensen Skeel
- (1731–1786) Jørgen Christensen Scheel (1718-1786)
- (1786–1823) Jørgen Jørgensen Scheel
- (1823–1829) the Danish State
- (1829–1840) Jacob von Benzon
- (1840–1888) Ernst August Pyrmont Jacobsen von Benzon
- (1888–1893) Albertine von Benzon
- (1893–1927) Anne Marie Elisabeth von Benzon married, in 1901, de Mylius
- (1927–1936) Fritze Henny Margrethe von Hedemann married Mylius von Benzon
- (1936–1943) Ib Mylius von Benzon
- (1943–1945) Benzon Gods A/S
- (1945–1947) the Danish State
- (1947–1950) Sostrup Gods A/S (the estate)
- (1950–1952) Company (the castle building)
- (1952–1995) Sostrup Gods a/s (the estate)
- (1952–1960) Harald Mark (the castle building)
- (1960–1966) Maria Hjerte Abbey, Sankt Bernhards Stiftelse (the castle building)
- (1966–2014) Sankt Bernhards Stiftelse (main building and barnyard)
- (1995–2006) P. Ole Fanger (estate)
- (2014–2015) Kirsten B. Swift and Anders Bundgaard
- (2015–2025) Kirsten B. Swift
- (2025–) Thomas Kirk Kristiansen and Jim Lyngvild

== Sources/links ==
- Bygnings og landskabskultur i Norddjurs
