= Hallendrup =

Village in Favrskov Municipality, Denmark

Coordinates: 56°22′N 10°07′E

Hallendrup is a small village in Favrskov Municipality in Denmark. There's a small village of the same name 36 km to the east in Norddjurs Municipality.

In 2020, the city council of Hallendrup voted in favor of building six large wind turbines.
