= Meilgaard Castle =

Coordinates: 56°30′11″N 10°39′31″E

Meilgaard Castle

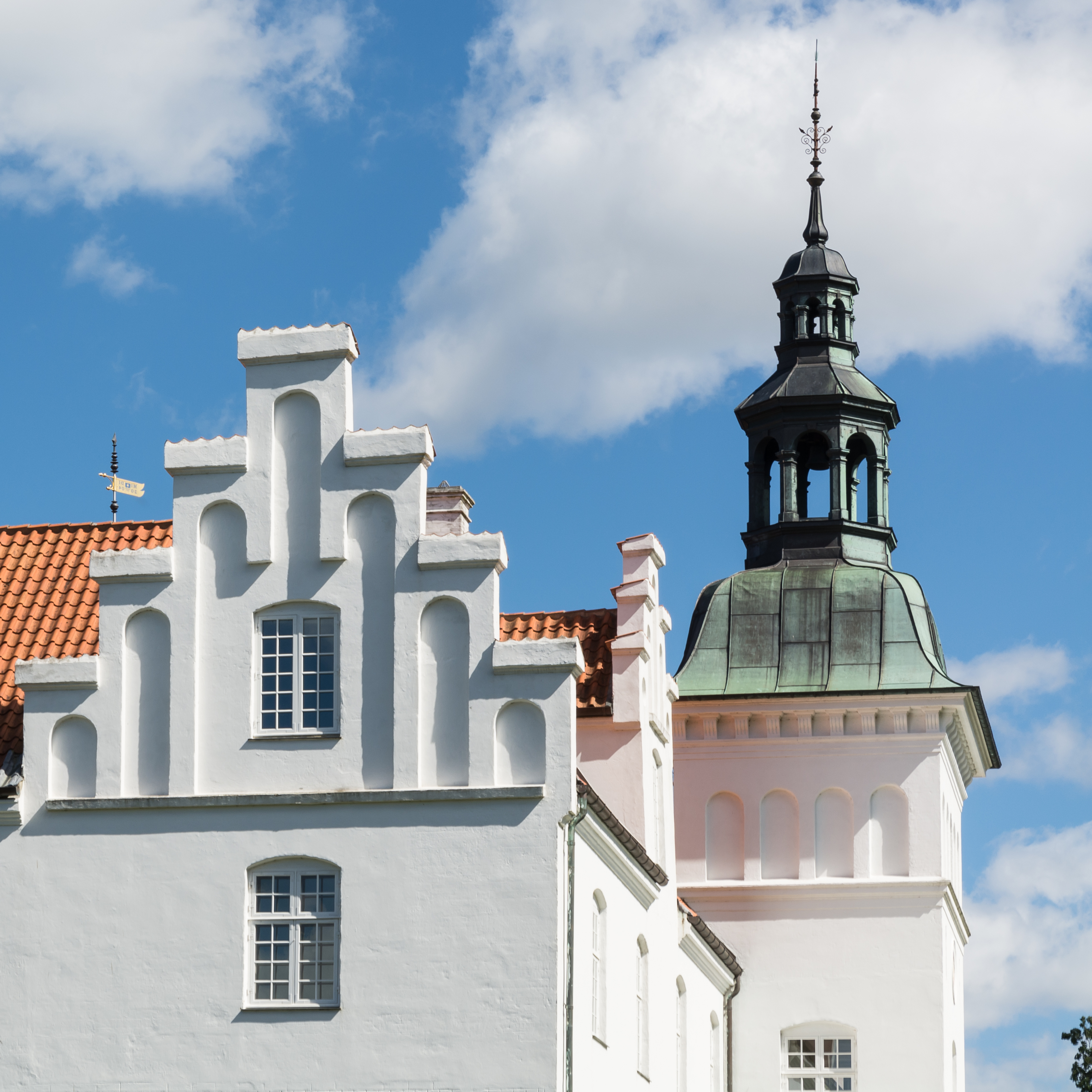

Meilgaard Castle (Danish: Meilgård Gods) is a castle and estate located in Glesborg Parish in Norddjurs Municipality, Denmark. It is situated between Fjellerup Strand and Bønnerup Strand on the Djursland peninsula.

== History ==
The estate known as Medelgård was first mentioned when the estate changed title in 1345. The current castle dates from 1573; it was extended in 1873 with the main building thoroughly rebuilt in the period 1888–1891

Over the centuries, the estate changed ownership between many different families. Meilgaard was acquired in 1868 by Baron Christian Iuel-Brockdorff (1827–1888) and is now owned by Michael F. Iuel and his wife Princess Désirée of Schaumburg-Lippe. Part of it has been converted to five private apartments. A former farm building is being used as a restaurant.

== Meilgaard Midden ==
The estate is of 2.070 hectares, of which 543 are farmed and 1.220 are forested. The coastal forest of Nederskov just north of the castle is home to the world's first scientifically excavated Midden (køkkenmødding). In 1848 the National Museum of Denmark organized an archaeological excavation of the Meilgaard midden under the direction of Jens Jacob Asmussen Worsaae (1821–1885) and Johan Georg Forchhammer (1794–1865). Scientists concluded that the oyster shells was not ordinary natural deposits, but leftovers and waste from the Ertebølle culture dating to the end of the Mesolithic period (ca 5300 BC – 3950 BC).
