= Charlotte Munck (actress) =

Danish actress

- Born: Charlotte Munck; 2 December 1969 (age 56); Aarhus, Denmark

Charlotte Munck (born 2 December 1969) is a Danish actress.

She is notable for starring in the Danish police television drama Anna Pihl as the title character, which was aired on TV2.

She was born in Aarhus and raised in Ørsted Djursland, about 14 miles from Randers. She was raised in a family of five, until she was 18 years old, and then moved to Copenhagen.

She has three siblings who are all musicians. The eldest sister is the singer in the band Armstrong, while her brother plays jazz trumpet and trained by the Rhythmic Conservatory.

Munck stars in the music video for "Show Stopper" from the album I Feel Cream by Peaches.

She also appears in the Danish Netflix series Baby Fever (2022- ) and the TV 2 series The Shift (2022).
