= Nørre Djurs Municipality =

Former municipality in Denmark

Coordinates: 56°28′41″N 10°43′25″E

Until 1 January 2007 Nørre Djurs municipality ("Northern Djursland") was a municipality (Danish, kommune) in the former Aarhus County on the east coast of the Jutland peninsula in central Denmark. The municipality covered an area of 237 km^{2}, and had a total population of 7.663 (2005). Its last mayor was Jens Peter Jellesen, a member of the Venstre (Liberal Party) political party. The site of its municipal-council was the town of Glesborg. Other towns in the municipality were the beach towns of Bønnerup Strand, Fjellerup Strand, and Gjerrild Nordstrand, and the towns of Stokkebro and Voldby.

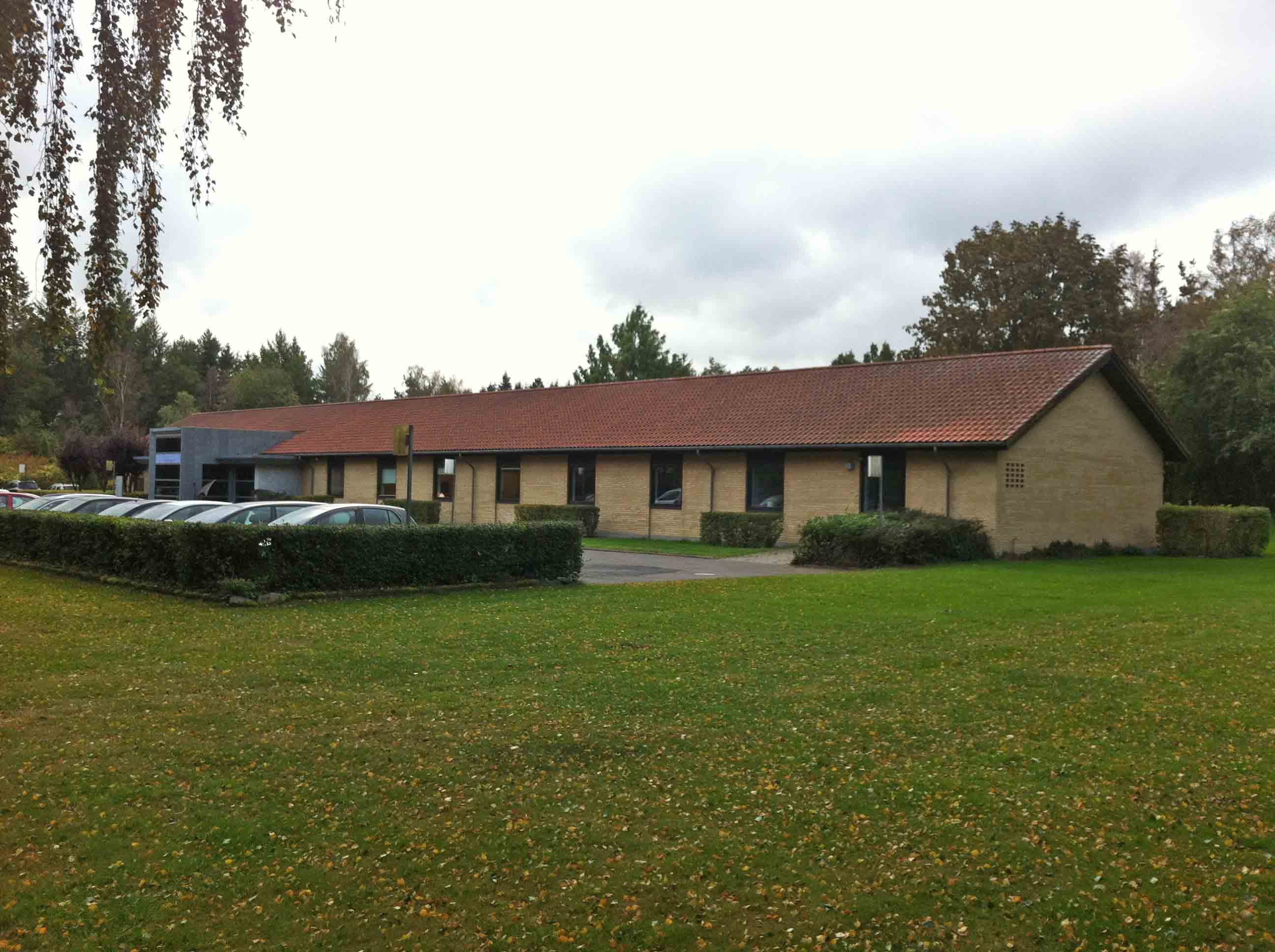
The former townhall of Nørre Djurs Municipality in Glesborg

Nørre Djurs Municipality ceased to exist due to Kommunalreformen ("The Municipality Reform" of 2007). It was combined with existing Grenaa and Rougsø municipalities, along with the eastern part of Sønderhald municipality to form the new Norddjurs municipality. This created a municipality with an area of 661 km^{2} and a total population of 34,382 (2005). The new municipality belongs to Region Midtjylland ("Mid-Jutland Region").
