= Allingåbro =

- Town
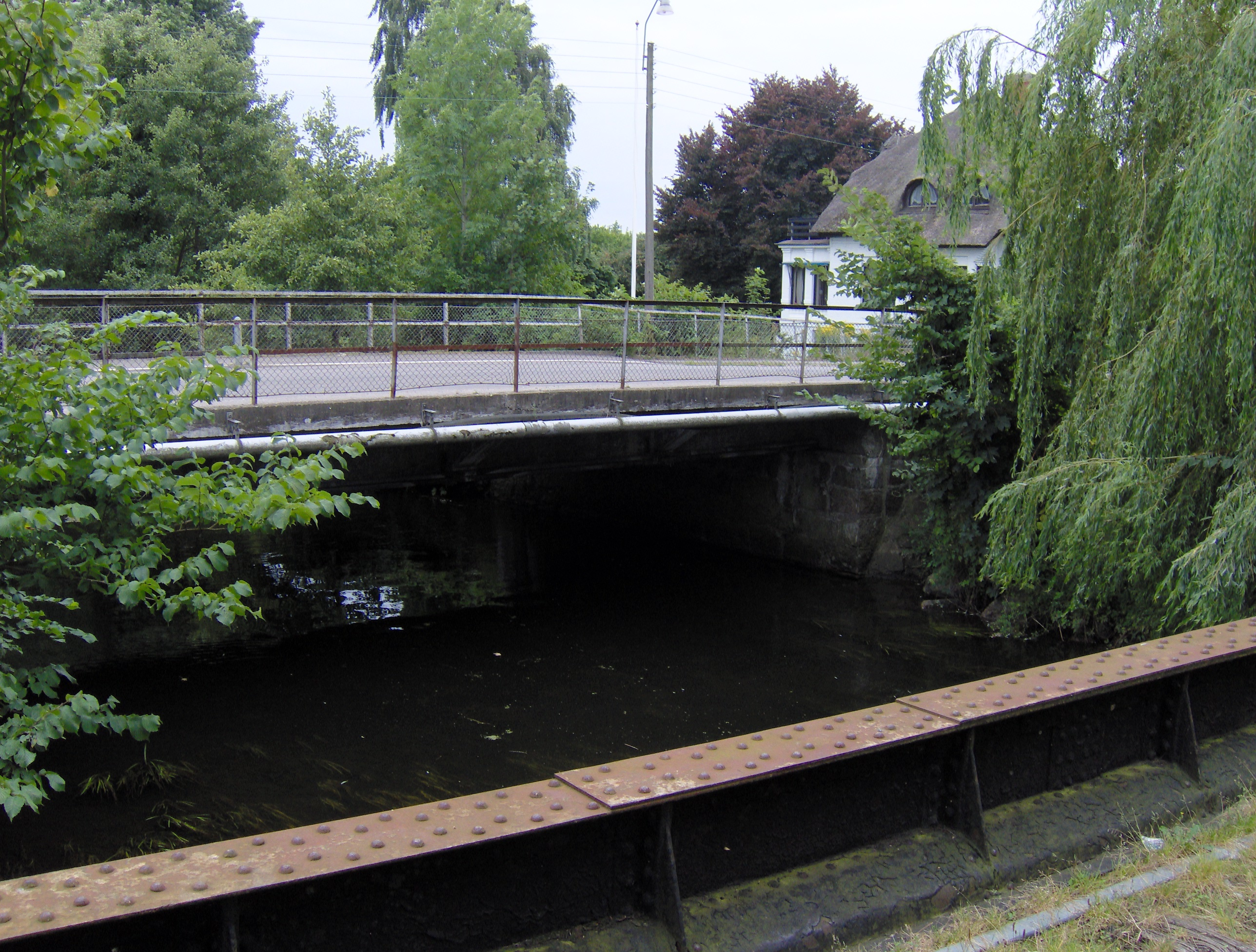
- The bridge over Alling Å in Allingåbro

- Location in Denmark Allingåbro (Central Denmark Region)
- Coordinates: 56°27′52″N 10°19′6″E
- Country: Denmark
- Region: Central Denmark (Midtjylland)
- Municipality: Norddjurs Municipality
- Parish: Vejlby Parish

Area
  - Urban: 1.7 km^{2} (0.66 sq mi)

Population (2026)
  - Urban: 1,819
  - Urban density: 1,100/km^{2} (2,800/sq mi)
- Time zone: UTC+1 (CET)
  - Summer (DST): UTC+2 (CEST)
- Postal code: DK-8961 Allingåbro

Allingåbro is a town on the western part of the Djursland peninsula, with a population of 1,819 (1 January 2026), in Norddjurs Municipality, Central Denmark Region in Denmark. It is located at the stream of Alling Å, 6 km northwest of Auning, 22 km east of Randers and 41 km west of Grenaa.

Allingåbro is a former railway town at the Randers–Ryomgård railway line, which was closed in 1971. It was also the municipal seat of the former Rougsø Municipality until 1 January 2007.

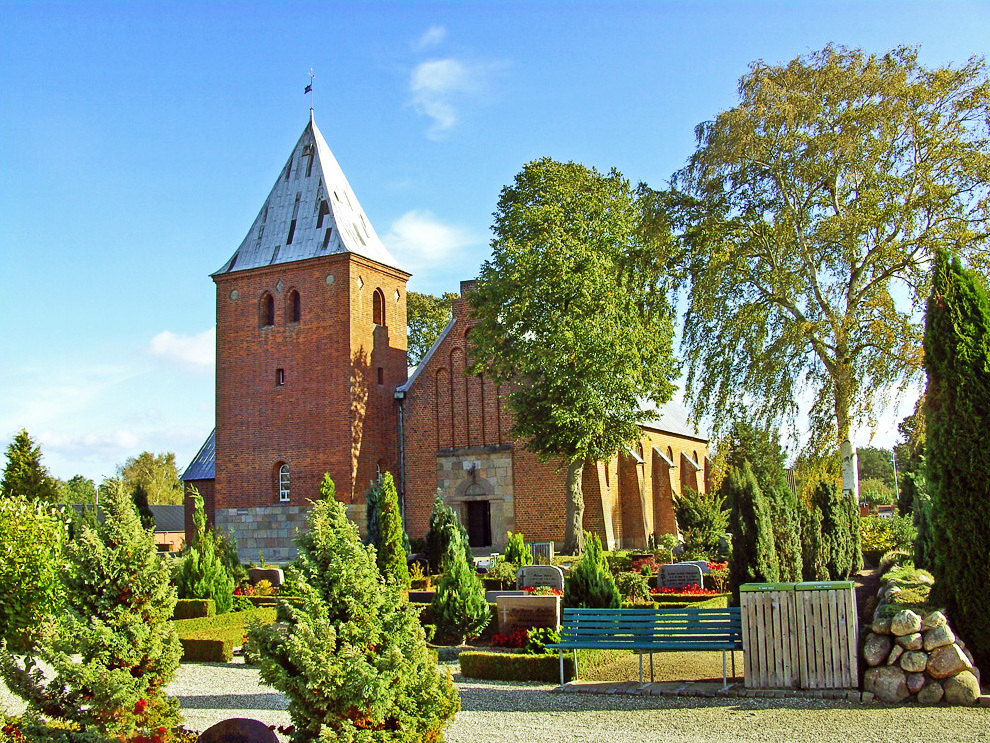
Vejlby Church

Vejlby Church is located in the former village of Vejlby on the northern outskirts of the town. It is a Romanesque church build in the twelfth Century.

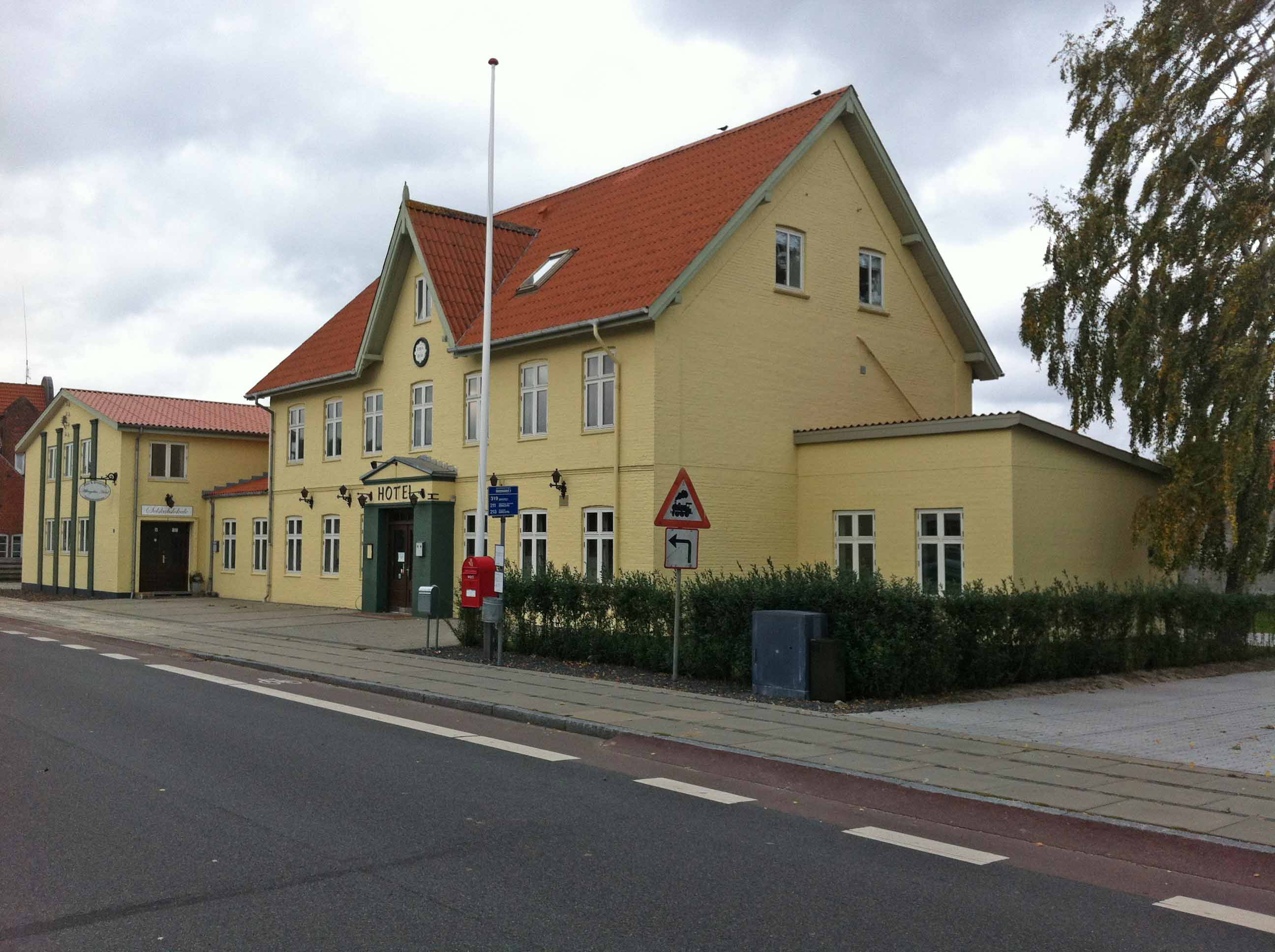
Allingåbro Hotel, the former hotel in Allingåbro

Allingåbro Hotel, the town's former hotel, was fully renovated in 2010 not as a hotel but as a B&B and facilities to serve as the village hall.

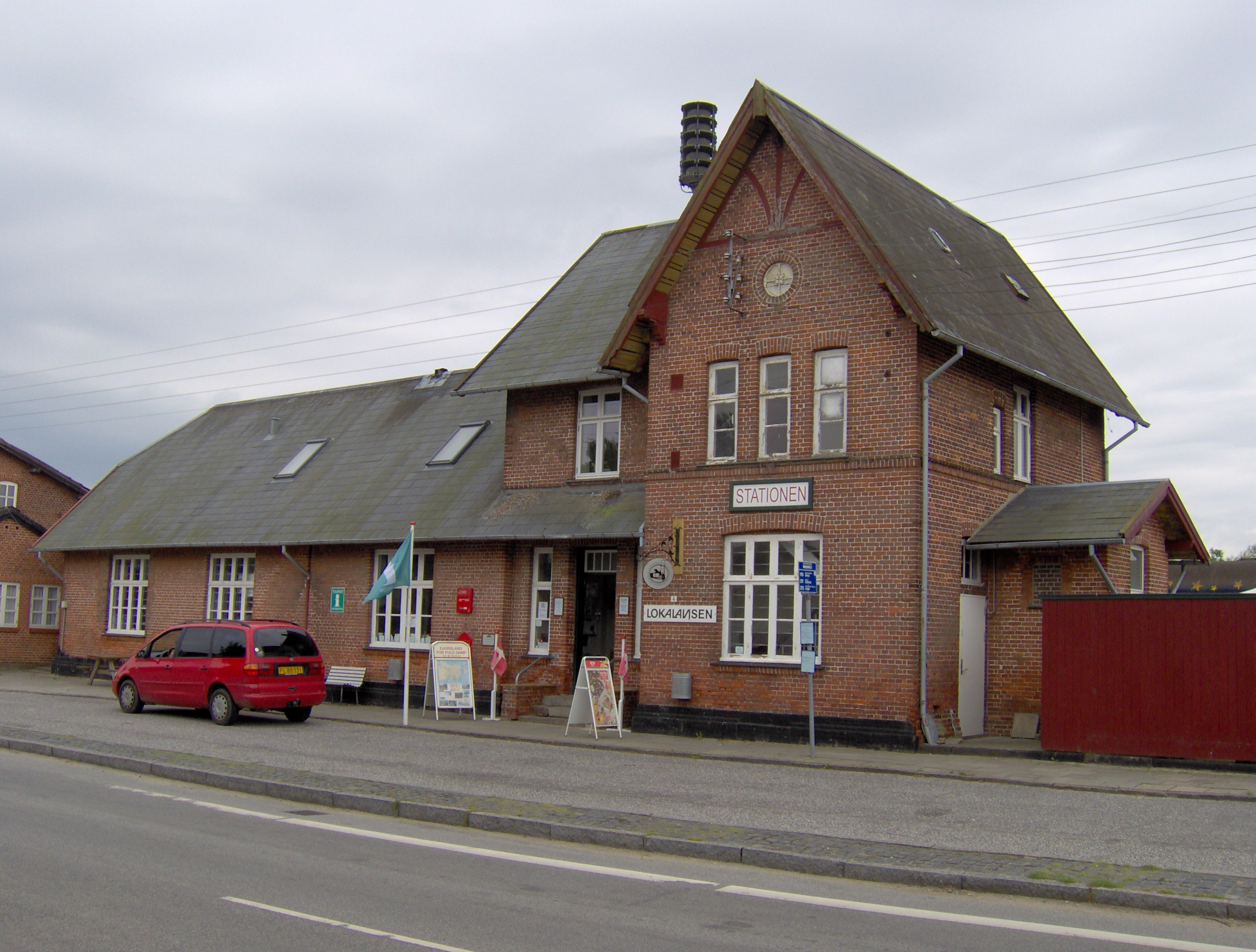
The former railway station in Allingåbro

The former railway station is the setting for a wide range of activities, which include cycle trolley and canoe rental, there is an automobile museum in the old warehouse next to the station.
