= Søby =

Søby is a Danish surname. Notable people with the surname include:

- Egil Søby (born 1945), Norwegian sprint canoeist
- Frode Søby (born 1935), Danish chess master
- Nina Søby (born 1956), Norwegian former professional racing cyclist
- Søs Søby (born 1991), Danish handballer
- Tove Søby (born 1933), Danish sprint canoer
