= Grenaa Municipality =

Former municipality in Denmark

Coordinates: 56°25′N 10°53′E

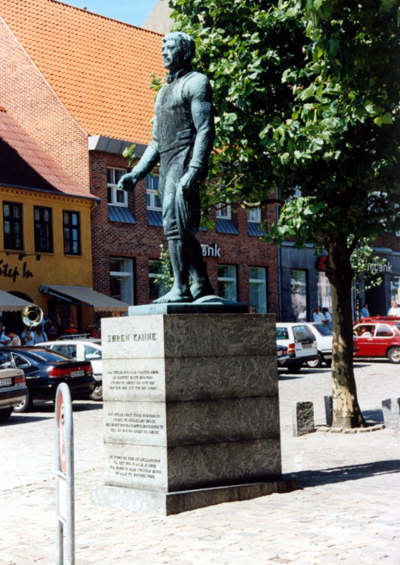
Statue of Søren Kanne (1801-1860) in Grenaa, Denmark. Photo: Jakob Øhlenschlæger.

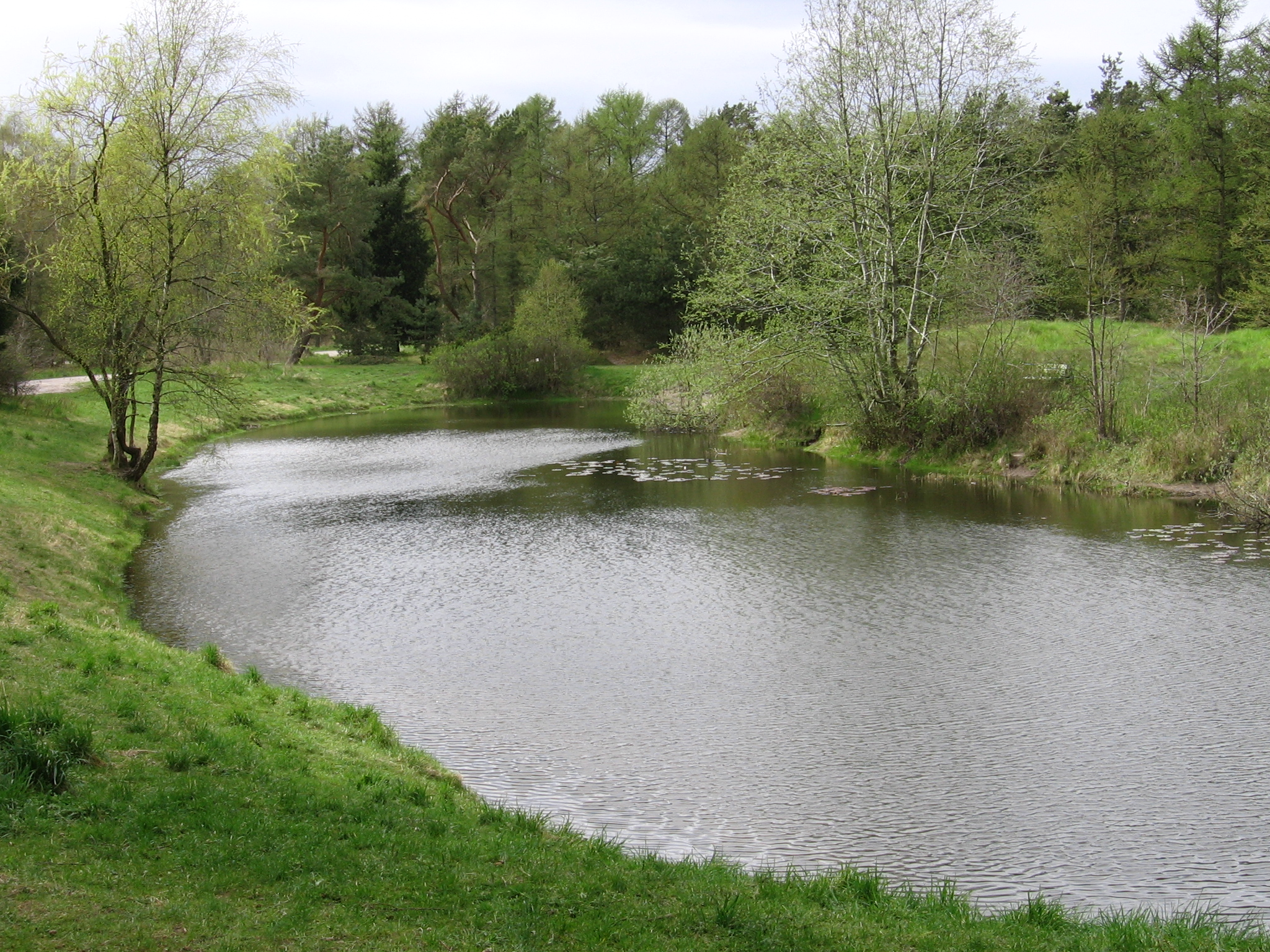
Grenaa Forest Lake (Skovsø), in Grenaa, Denmark. Photo: Bjarke Freund-Hansen (May 2005).

Until 1 January 2007, Grenaa municipality or Grenå municipality was a municipality (Danish, kommune) in Aarhus County on the east coast of the Jutland peninsula in central Denmark. The municipality covered an area of 196 km^{2}, and had a total population of 18,641 (2005). Its last mayor was Gert Schou, a member of the Social Democrats (Socialdemokraterne) political party. The municipality's main city and the site of its municipal council was the town of Grenaa. The municipality was located on the east coast of the peninsula known as Djursland, with the waters of the Kattegat to the east, defining the municipality's eastern border.

Grenaa municipality ceased to exist due to Kommunalreformen ("The Municipality Reform" of 2007). It was combined with Nørre Djurs and Rougsø municipalities, along with the eastern part of Sønderhald municipality to form the new Norddjurs municipality. This created a municipality with an area of 661 km^{2} and a total population of 34,382 (2005). The new municipality belongs to Region Midtjylland ("Mid-Jutland Region").
