= Vivild (town) =

- Village
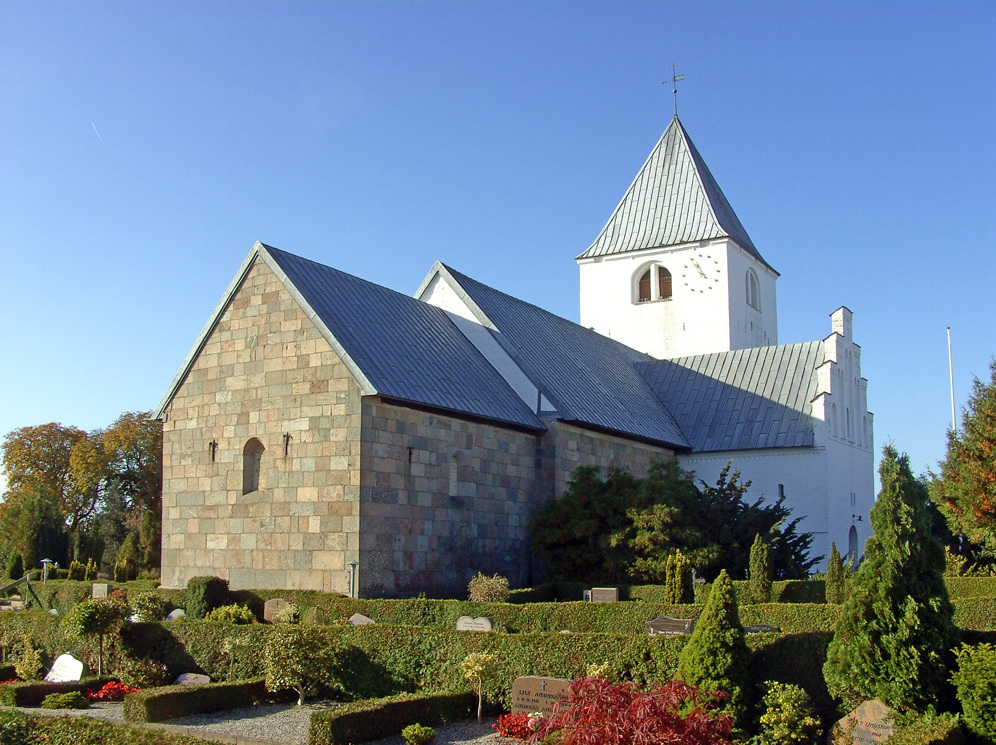
- Vivild Church

- Location in Central Denmark Region Vivild (Denmark)
- Coordinates: 56°28′58″N 10°26′48″E
- Country: Denmark
- Region: Central Denmark (Midtjylland)
- Municipality: Norddjurs

Population (2026)
  - Total: 767
- postal code: DK-8961 Allingåbro
- Website: http://www.vivild-by.dk

Vivild is a village on the Djursland peninsula in Jutland, Denmark, with a population of 767 (1 January 2026). It is a part of Norddjurs Municipality located 9 km northeast of Auning, 29 km east of Randers and 33 km west of Grenaa.

Vivild Church is located in the village.

== Notable people ==
- Halfdan T. Mahler (1923 in Vivild – 2016) a Danish physician. He served three terms as director-general of the World Health Organization (WHO) from 1973 to 1988
