= Sønderhald Municipality =

Former municipality in Denmark

Coordinates: 56°25′53″N 10°22′34″E

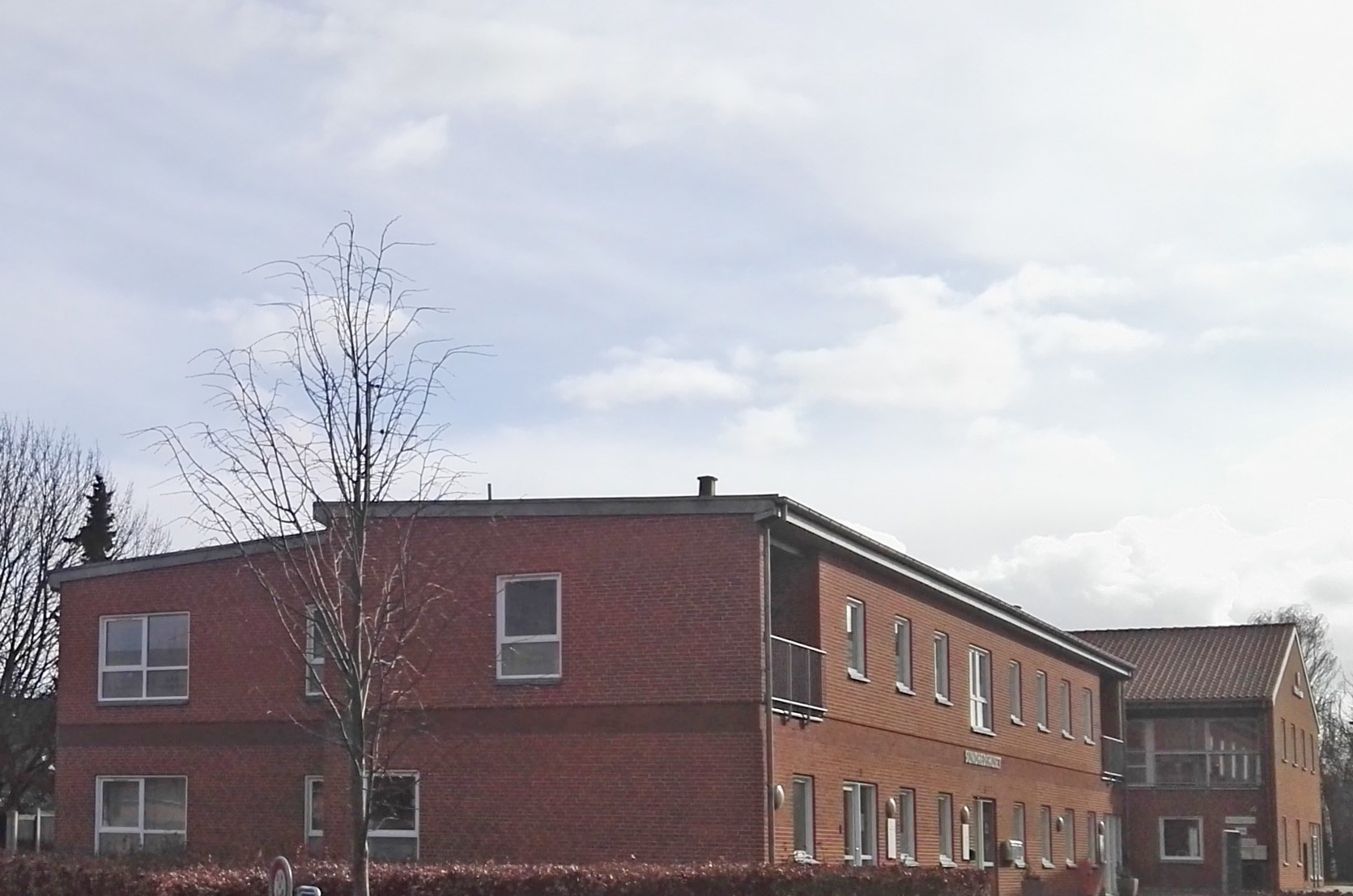
Auning Health Center at Middelgade 1 in Auning, former town hall in Sønderhald Municipality

Until 1 January 2007 Sønderhald municipality was a municipality (Danish, kommune) in the former Aarhus County in the eastern part of the Jutland peninsula (Djurs) in central Denmark. It covered an area of 138 km^{2}, and had a total population of 8.503 (2005). Its last mayor was Kirsten Wyrtz, a member of the Social Democrats (Socialdemokraterne) political party. The site of its municipal council was Auning. Other towns in the municipality were Assentoft, Uggelhuse, and Øster Alling.

The municipality was created in 1970 due to a kommunalreform ("Municipality Reform") that combined a number of existing parishes:

- Auning Parish
- Essenbæk Parish
- Fausing Parish
- Hørning Parish
- Vester Alling Parish
- Virring Parish
- Årslev Parish
- Øster Alling Parish

Sønderhald municipality ceased to exist due to Kommunalreformen ("The Municipality Reform" of 2007). The eastern part of the municipality was combined with Nørre Djurs, Rougsø and Grenaa municipalities to form the new Norddjurs municipality. This created a municipality with an area of 661 km^{2} and a total population of 34,382 (2005). The new municipality belongs to Region Midtjylland ("Mid-Jutland Region"). The remainder was incorporated into an enlarged Randers municipality along with Randers, Nørhald, and Purhus municipalities, as well as parts of Mariager and Langå.

== Attractions ==
- Old Estrup, Jutland's Estate Museum (Gammel Estrup Jyllands Herregårdsmuseum)
