= Glesborg =

- Village
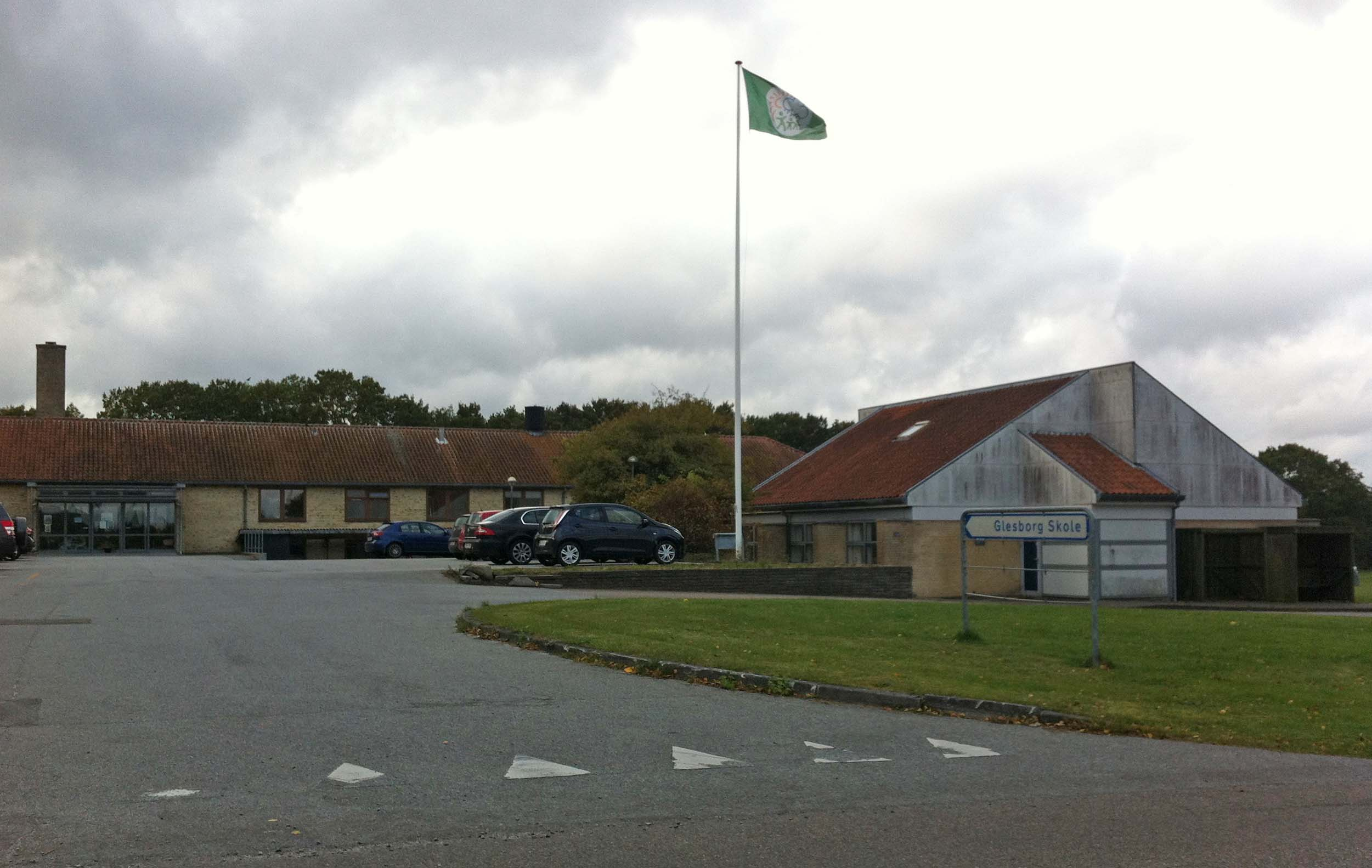
- Glesborg School

- Location in Central Denmark Region Glesborg (Denmark)
- Coordinates: 56°28′43″N 10°43′28″E
- Country: Denmark
- Region: Central Denmark (Midtjylland)
- Municipality: Norddjurs Municipality

Population (2026)
  - Total: 601

Glesborg is a village, with a population of 601 (1 January 2026), in Norddjurs Municipality, Central Denmark Region in Denmark. It is located 20 km northeast of Ryomgård, 48 km east of Randers and 16 km northwest of Grenaa.

Glesborg was the municipal seat of the former Nørre Djurs Municipality until 1 January 2007.

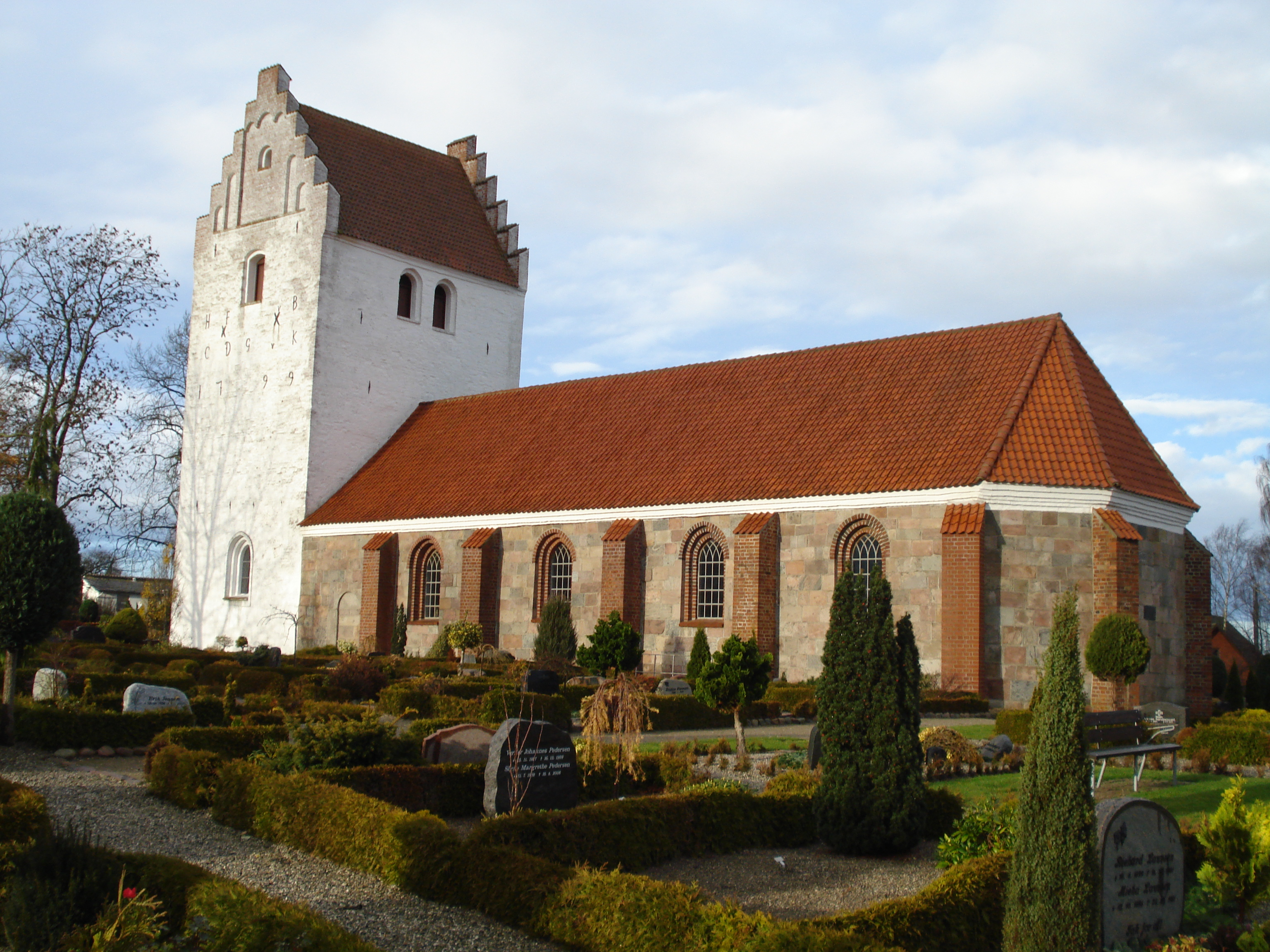
Glesborg Church

Glesborg Church, built in the 13th century, is located in the village.
