= Ørsted, Denmark =

Ørsted
- Town
- Location in Denmark Ørsted (Central Denmark Region)
- Coordinates: 56°30′4″N 10°20′15″E
- Country: Denmark
- Region: Central Denmark (Midtjylland)
- Municipality: Norddjurs Municipality

Area
  - Urban: 1.3 km^{2} (0.50 sq mi)

Population (2026)
  - Urban: 1,312
  - Urban density: 1,000/km^{2} (2,600/sq mi)
- Time zone: UTC+1 (CET)
  - Summer (DST): UTC+2 (CET)
- Postal code: DK-8950 Ørsted

Ørsted is a small town, with a population of 1,312 (1 January 2026), in Norddjurs Municipality, Central Denmark Region in Denmark. It is located on the northwestern part of the Djursland peninsula 6 km east of Randers Fjord.

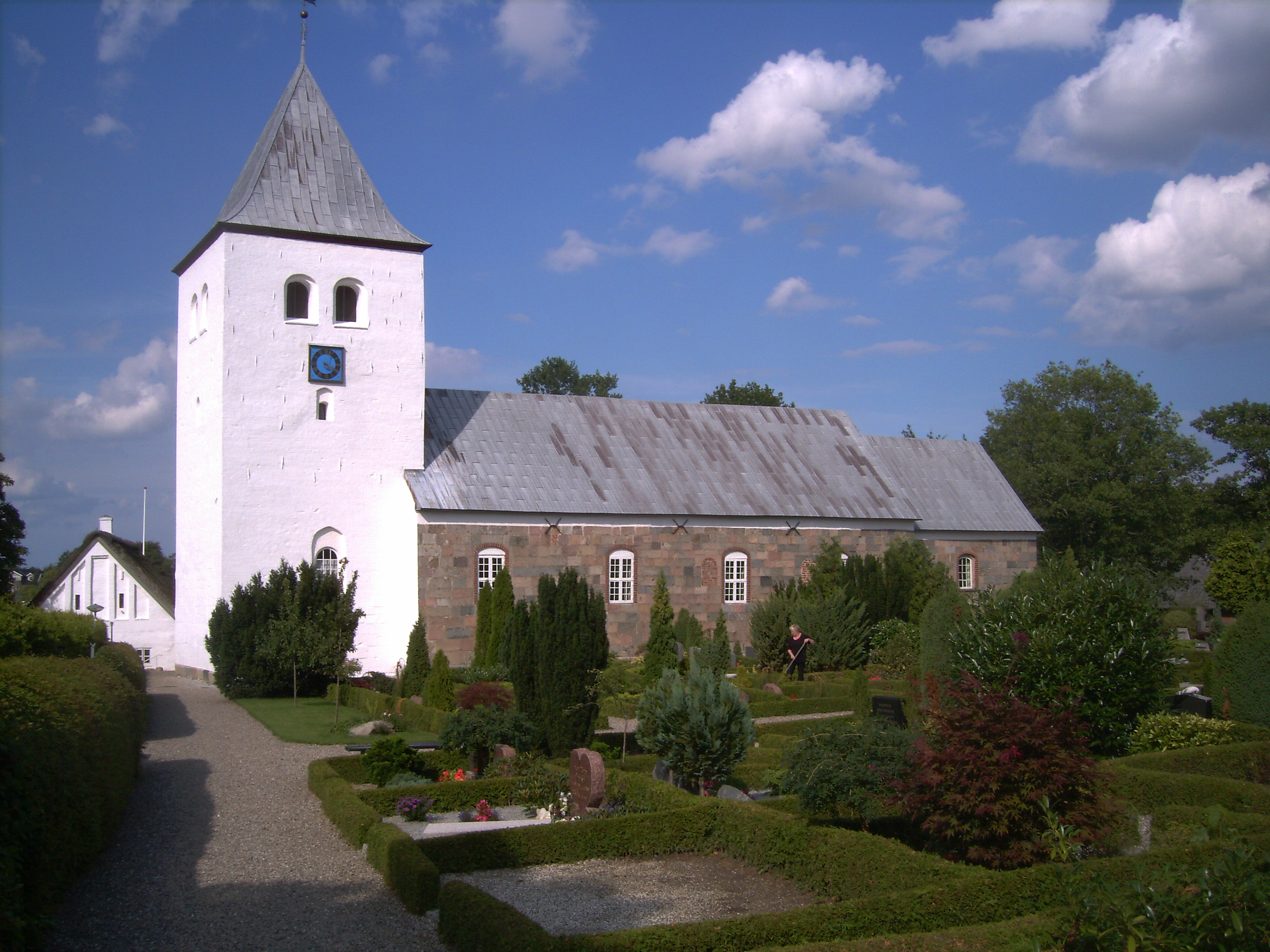
Ørsted Church

Ørsted Church is located in the town.

== Notable people ==
- The actress Charlotte Munck was raised in Ørsted.
