= Auning =

- Town
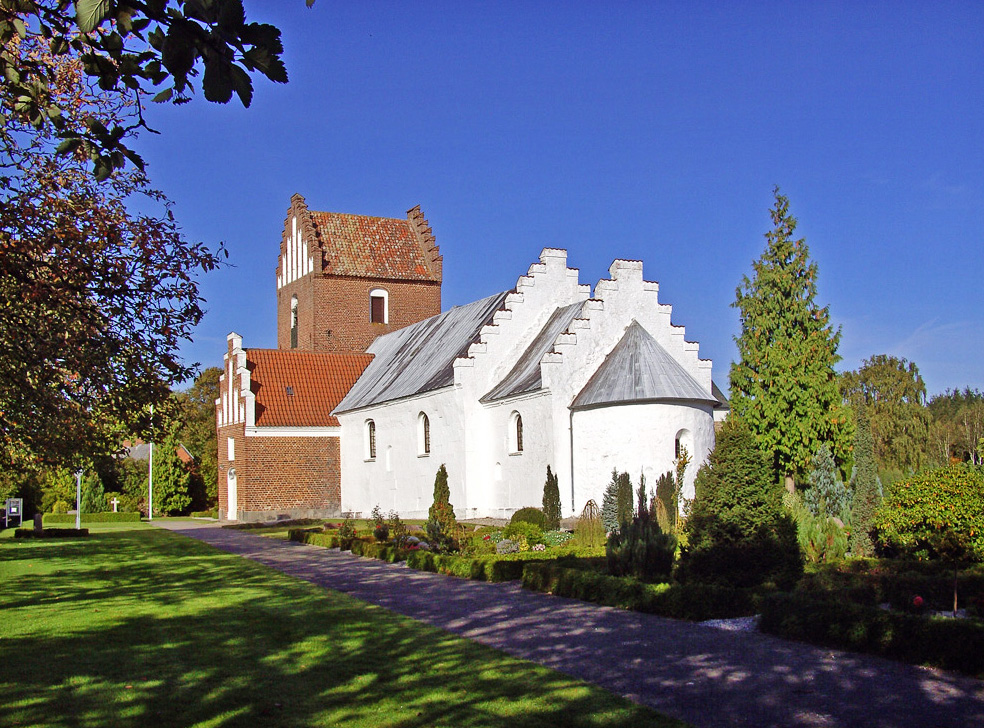
- Auning Church

- Location in Denmark Auning (Central Denmark Region)
- Coordinates: 56°25′46″N 10°22′32″E
- Country: Denmark
- Region: Region Midtjylland
- Municipality: Norddjurs Municipality

Area
  - Urban: 2.4 km^{2} (0.93 sq mi)

Population (2026)
  - Urban: 3,383
  - Urban density: 1,400/km^{2} (3,700/sq mi)
  - Gender: 1,593 males and 1,790 females
- Time zone: UTC+1 (CET)
  - Summer (DST): UTC+2 (CEST)
- Postal code: DK-8963 Auning

Auning is a minor town on the main road between Randers and Grenå, with a population of 3,383 (1 January 2026). It is located in Region Midtjylland and in Norddjurs Municipality. It used to be one of the two major towns in the abolished Sønderhald Municipality, the other being Assentoft which now belongs to Randers Municipality.

== Notable people ==
- Caspar Schrøder (1905 in Auning – 1989) a Danish fencer, competed at the 1936 Summer Olympics
- Jens Meilvang (born 1981), Danish politician
