= Norddjurs Municipality =

Norddjurs Municipality Norddjurs Kommune (Danish)
- Municipality
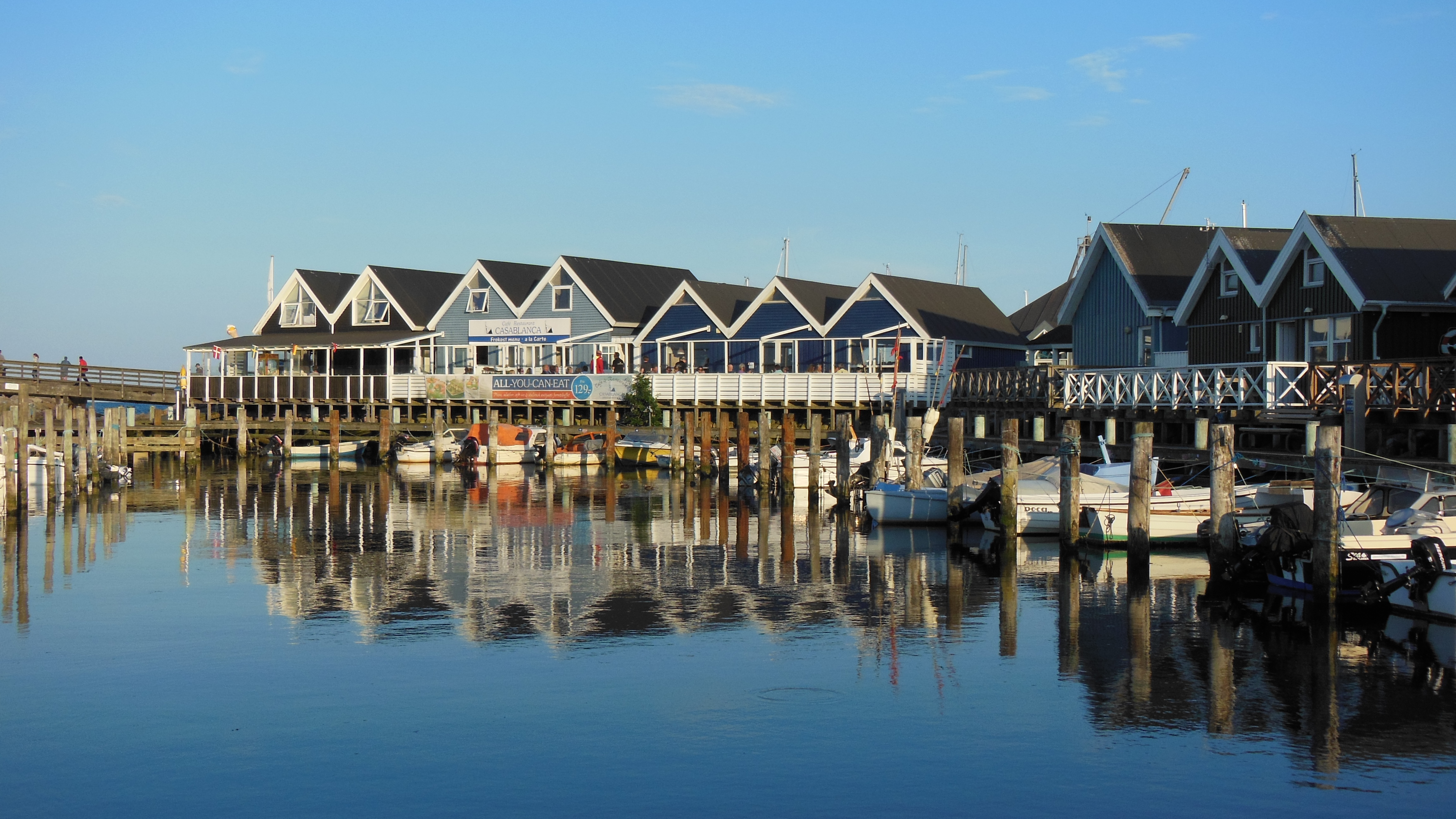

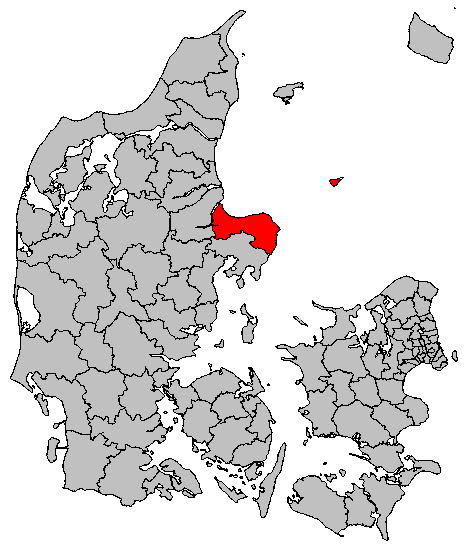
- Location in Denmark
- Coordinates: 56°30′N 10°48′E
- Country: Denmark
- Region: Central Denmark
- Established: 1 January 2007

Government
  - Mayor: Kasper Bjerregaard

Area
  - Total: 721.2 km^{2} (278.5 sq mi)

Population (1 January 2026)
  - Total: 36,477
  - Density: 50.58/km^{2} (131.0/sq mi)
- Time zone: UTC+1 (CET)
  - Summer (DST): UTC+2 (CEST)
- Postal code: 8500
- Website: norddjurs.dk

Norddjurs Municipality (Danish: Norddjurs Kommune) is a municipality (Danish, kommune) in Region Midtjylland in Denmark. It covers an area of 721.2 km^{2} and has a population of 36,477 (1 January 2026).

On 1 January 2007 Norddjurs municipality was created as the result of Kommunalreformen ("The Municipal Reform" of 2007), consisting of the former municipalities of Grenå, Nørre Djurs and Rougsø, along with the eastern part of Sønderhald municipality. It includes the island of Anholt in its extreme northeast.

The municipality is part of Business Region Aarhus and of the East Jutland metropolitan area, which had a total population of 1.378 million in 2016.

== Locations ==
Grenaa	14,000
Auning	2,900
Allingåbro	1,800
Ørsted	1,400
Trustrup	790
Vivild	790
Bønnerup Strand	740
Ørum	700
Glesborg	580

== Politics ==
=== Municipal council ===
Norddjurs' municipal council consists of 27 members, elected every four years.

Below are the municipal councils elected since the Municipal Reform of 2007.

Election	Party								Total seats	Turnout	Elected mayor
Election	A	C	F	I	L	O	V	Ø	Total seats	Turnout	Elected mayor
2005	11	1	1		3	1	10		27	69.2%	Torben Jensen (L)
2009	11	1	3		4	2	6		27	66.2%	Jan Petersen (A)
2013	11	1	1	2	2	2	6	2	27	70.4%	Jan Petersen (A)
2017	11	2	2	2		3	6	1	27	69.0%	Jan Petersen (A)
Data from Kmdvalg.dk 2005, 2009, 2013 and 2017

== Parishes ==
- Albøge Parish

== Sources ==
- Municipal statistics: NetBorger Kommunefakta, delivered from KMD aka Kommunedata (Municipal Data)
- Municipal mergers and neighbors: Eniro new municipalities map
