= Trehøje Mols =

Three large mounds in Syddjurs, Denmark

Trehøje
- Scenic area
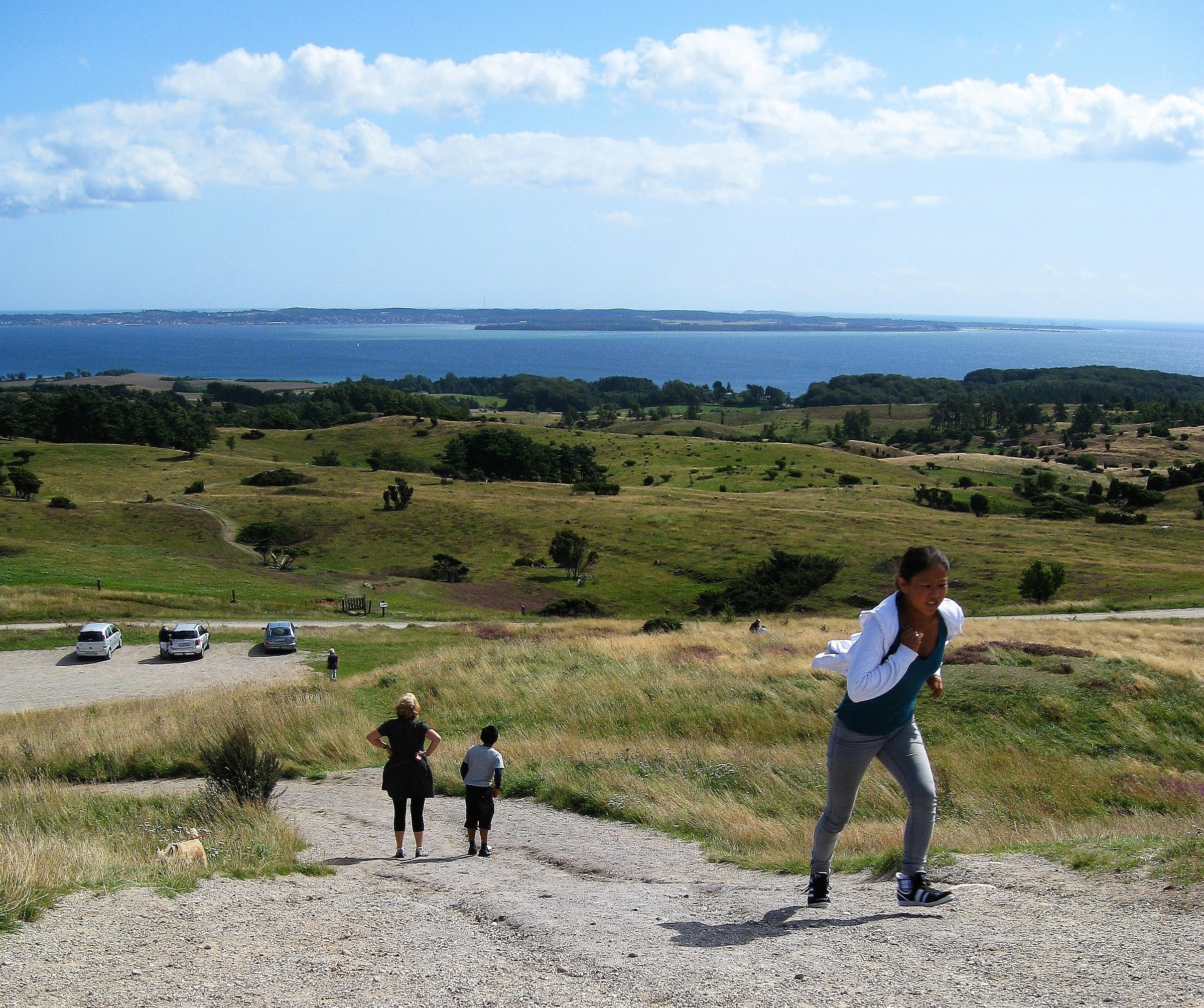
- Trehøje - looking east towards Ebeltoft.

- Trehøje in Denmark
- Coordinates: 56°10′N 10°32′E
- Location: Central Denmark (Djursland), Denmark

Trehøje is a Danish vista point with a view of the sea to the east, south and west, located in the Mols Bjerge National Park on the peninsula Djursland between Denmark and Sweden. Three large bronze-age barrows close to each other 127 meters above the sea, have given their name to the place, which contains a group of 22 barrows. "Trehøje" meaning three mounds, is one of four major vista points in the hills of Mols, each with a barrow on top. The others are Ellemandsbjerg, Stabelhøje and Agri Baunehøj.

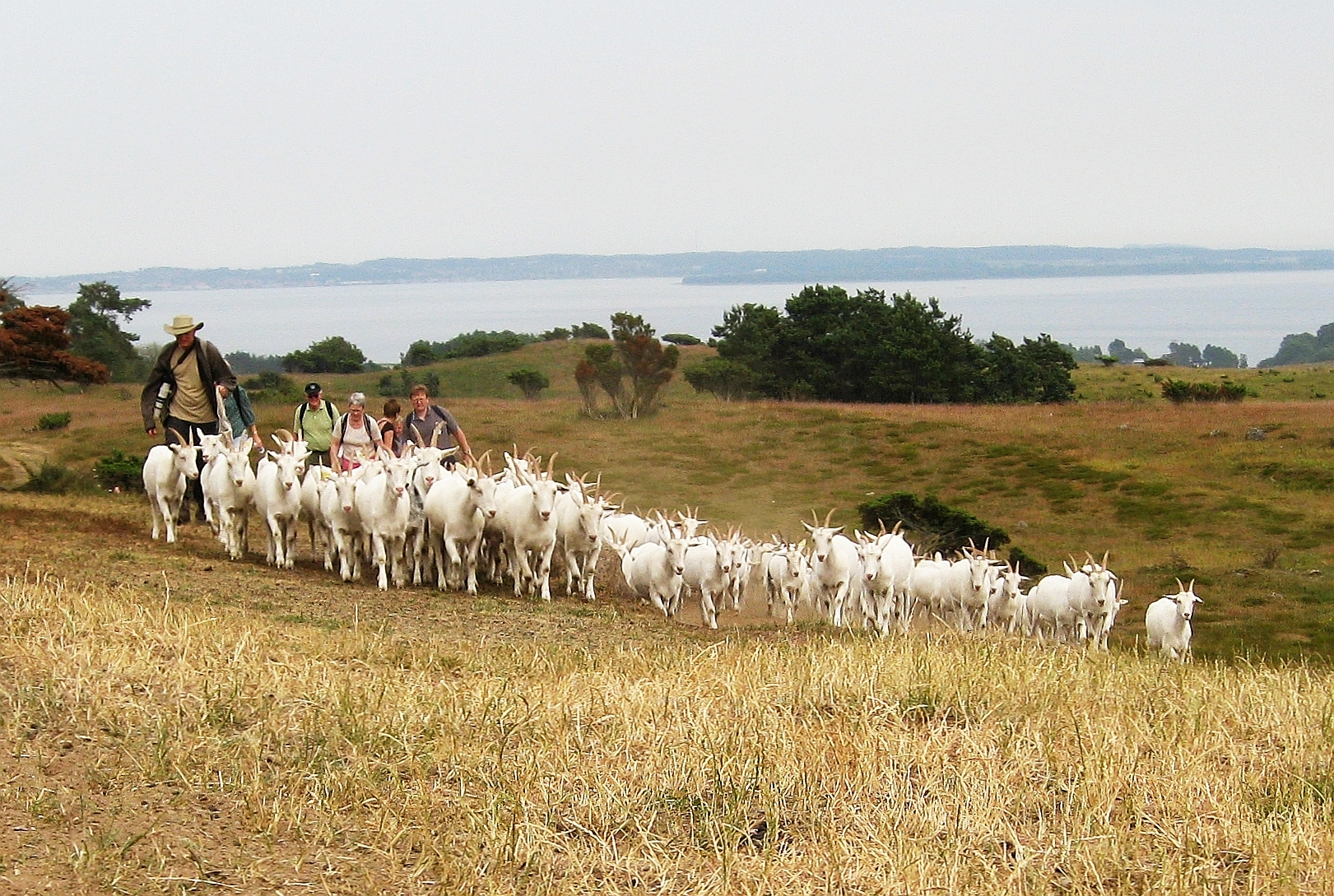
Goats, sheep, cattle and horses diminish tree growth at Trehøje.

The view from Trehøje includes the east coast of mainland Jutland, the islands Samsø, Tunø and Hjelm, plus the hilly Mols Bjerge landscape, including the peninsula Helgenæs. One can also see parts of southern Djursland and the towns of Aarhus and Ebeltoft in the distance. From the three barrows one can look down onto the bays of Knebel, Begtrup, Aarhus, and Ebeltoft, as well as the southern stretches of the Kattegat, the sea between Denmark and Sweden.

The three barrows are five to six meters high, each made of about 650,000 pieces of dug-out grass turf. This is equivalent to 7 hectares of land where the turf has been peeled off for each barrow. A labor-intensive undertaking, that was part of the erection of 60,000 bronze-age mounds registered in Denmark. It has been calculated that in Denmark 100 to 150 mounds were built per year in the early Bronze Age (1800–1000 BC). This effort points towards a strong, homogeneous and organized religious quest in a distant pre-Christian civilization.

The vegetation in the open land surrounding Trehøje predominantly consists of bent grass. A slender type of grass that forms a wavy red and violet surface in July and August, and stands out as a golden surface in the winter sun, dotted with darker mulberry bushes. Here and there one might be able to make out the remains of narrow 8–15-meters-wide curved fields from the Middle Ages. These fields emerged when the farmers predominantly plowed the furrows towards the center of the field. Maybe with the purpose of creating a contour that drains standing water to the sides of the fields.

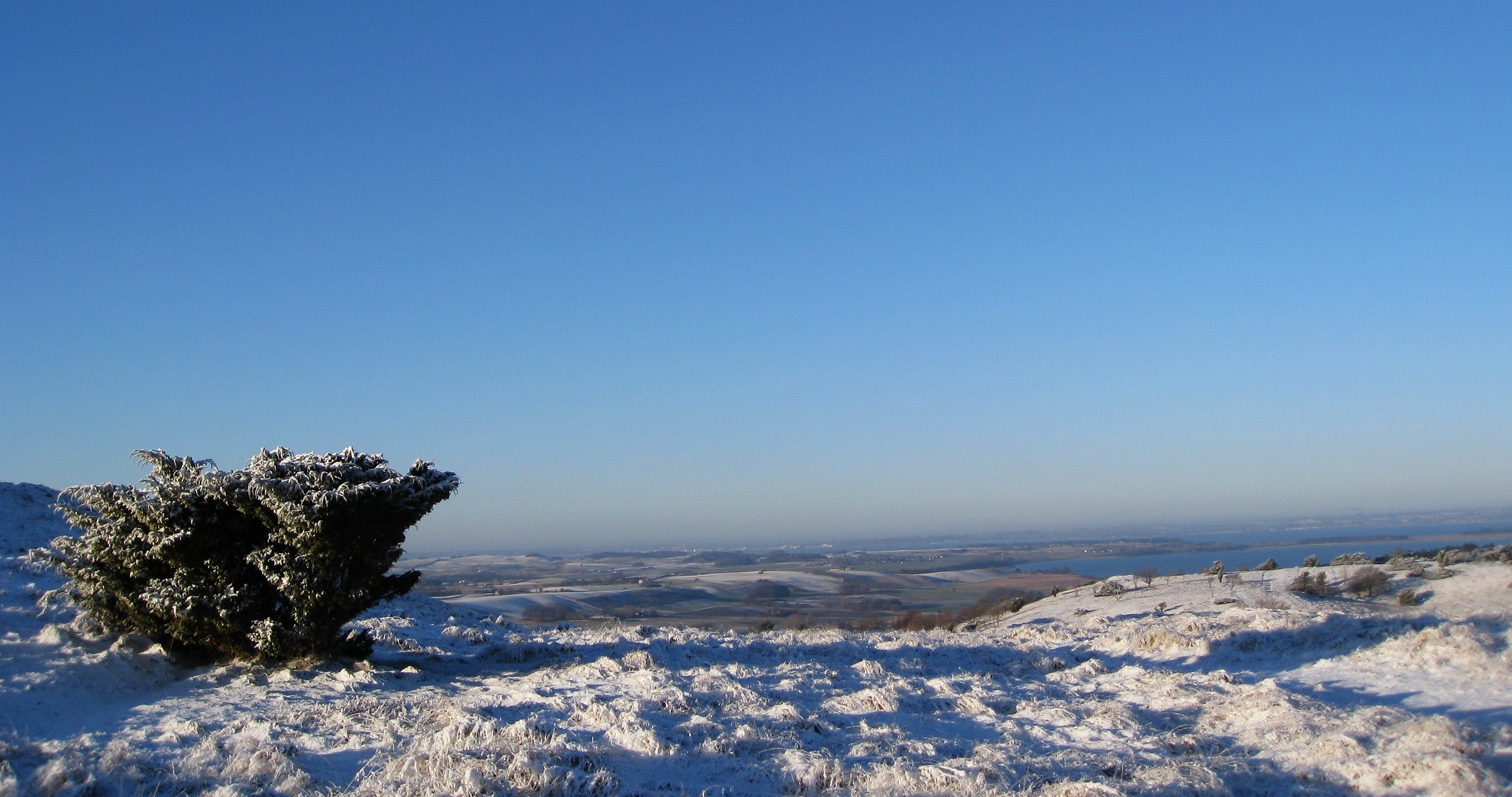
Winter view Trehøje, south-west towards Begtrup Bay, Aarhus Bay and Aarhus

Today focused landscaping underlies the formation of the open plain-like grassland surrounding Trehøje, as well as other parts of the protected Mols Bjerge Hills. Tree growth, which would otherwise take over the land, is kept down partly through grazing by sheep, goats, cattle and horses, and partly through felling of upcoming trees, as well as felling of established wooded areas.

A nutrient-poor common-like landscape is a landscaping goal for the area. This type of landscape occurred naturally in the Middle Ages, probably due to intensive grazing and repeated haymaking on the commons, combined with not bringing back the same amount of nutrients in the form of manure, as was taken away, according to a theory. In some descriptions of the formation of the depleted vegetation around Trehøje there is no mention of the wind-erosion factor, which can blow away fertile topsoil nutrients – even though this has been a determining depletion-factor for surrounding land on Djursland in the Middle Ages.

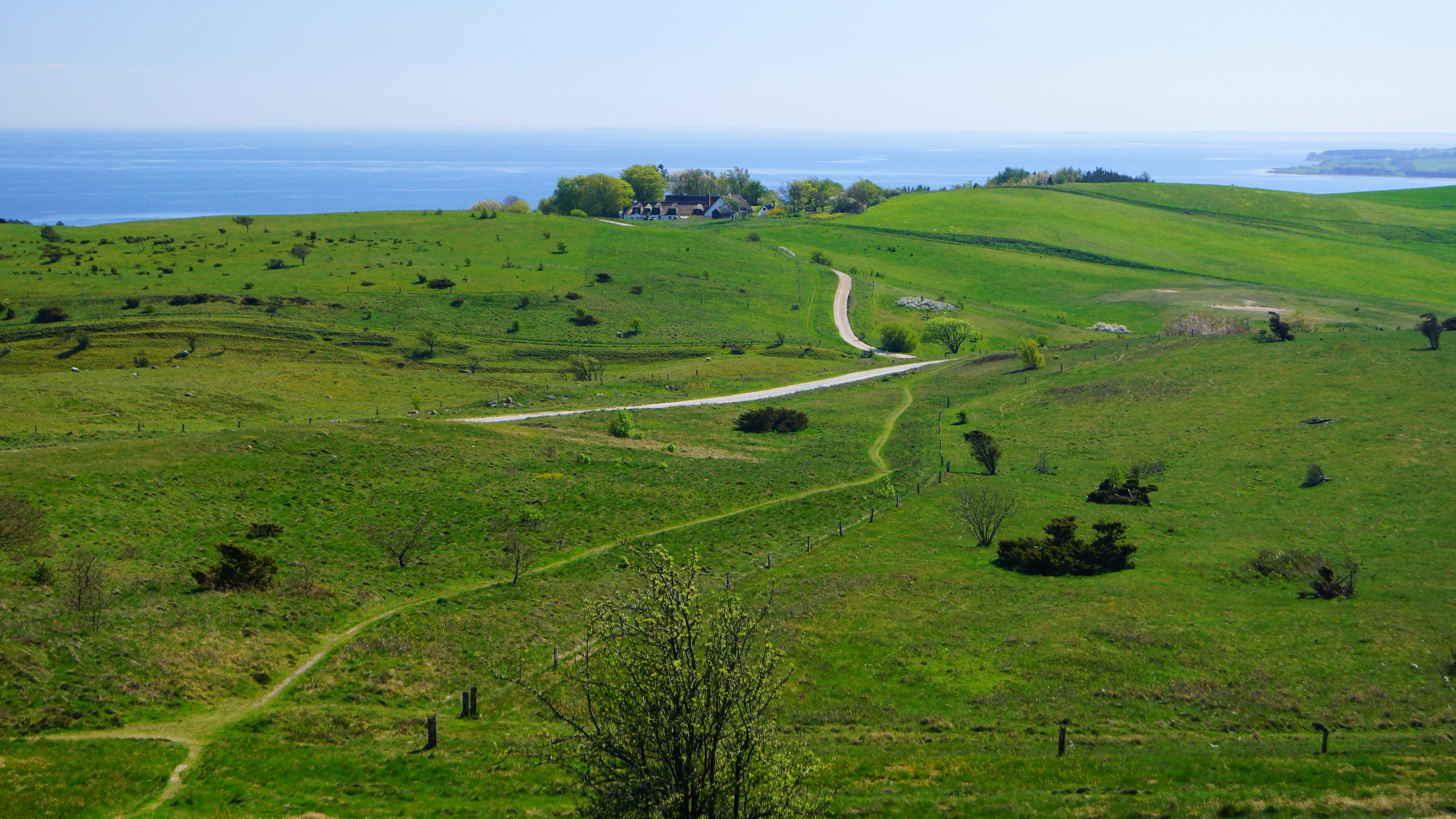
Spring view from Trehøje, south, over Ebeltoft Bay and Kattegat

One of the ideas behind favoring a common-like landscape is to make the Hills of Mols resemble the woodless tundra-plains left over, when the ice sheets drew back from the land after the last ice age plus 10,000 years ago, before Denmark became covered with forest. Another purpose behind this landscaping goal is to create habitats for zoology, not least insects, that are rare in other parts of Denmark. In addition the wood-free open countryside is visitor friendly, giving opportunities for walks and biking on the paths and gravel roads surrounding Trehøje, as well as in the rest of hilly Mols Bjerge.

== See also ==
National parks of Denmark
