= Mols =

- Region
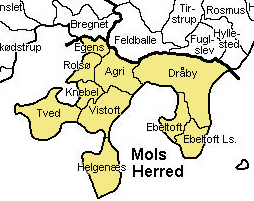
- Mols Herred

- Location of Mols in Denmark
- Coordinates: 56°11′N 10°31′E
- Country: Denmark
- Region: Central Denmark (Midtjylland)
- Municipality: Syddjurs
- Time zone: UTC+1 (CET)
  - Summer (DST): UTC+2 (CEST)
- Postal code: 8400

Mols is a small Danish gathering of hilly peninsulas in the southern part of the larger peninsula of Djursland on the east coast of Jutland. The largest peninsulas of Mols comprise Skødshoved to the west, and Helgenæs to the east.

Mols' largest town is Ebeltoft, a town on the coast, noted for its historical town centre. Some residents of Mols or Ebeltoft will argue that Ebeltoft is not a town of Mols. The usually accepted compromise is that Ebeltoft is the market town of Mols, although not geographically situated in present-day Mols.

Hills in Mols rise to 137 metres, high by Danish standards. The highest points are Agri Bavnehøj (137 m), Trehøje (127 m) and Stabelhøjene (135 m & 133 m). In 2008 this hilly area, Mols Bjerge (bjerge translates to "mountains"), was declared one of the first Danish national parks. It has unspoiled country, farms, rolling hills that descend to the sea, and few large resorts.

People of Mols, called Molboer, are the subjects of Molbohistorier – ethnic stories told by the townsfolk of Aarhus and Ebeltoft to ridicule rural people. Three of the better-known stories are "The Stork in the Corn", "The Thirsty Tree", and "Black Pudding".

== Tourism ==
Tourism is important on Mols, with multiple summer rentals, marinas and a total of twenty-two popular sandy beaches in the general area of Djursland, all of which are public as almost all of Denmark's coastline. Denmark and Mols are not densely populated, compared to central Europe, making the area uncrowded. The summer climate is mild, and it seldom gets unpleasantly hot. Situated on the eastern side of Jutland, and part of the small shallow Kattegat sea separating Denmark and Sweden, the seawater warms up fast in the summer and the coastlines are not exposed to rough tides and waves as normally experienced on the Jutlandic west coast.

== Gallery ==
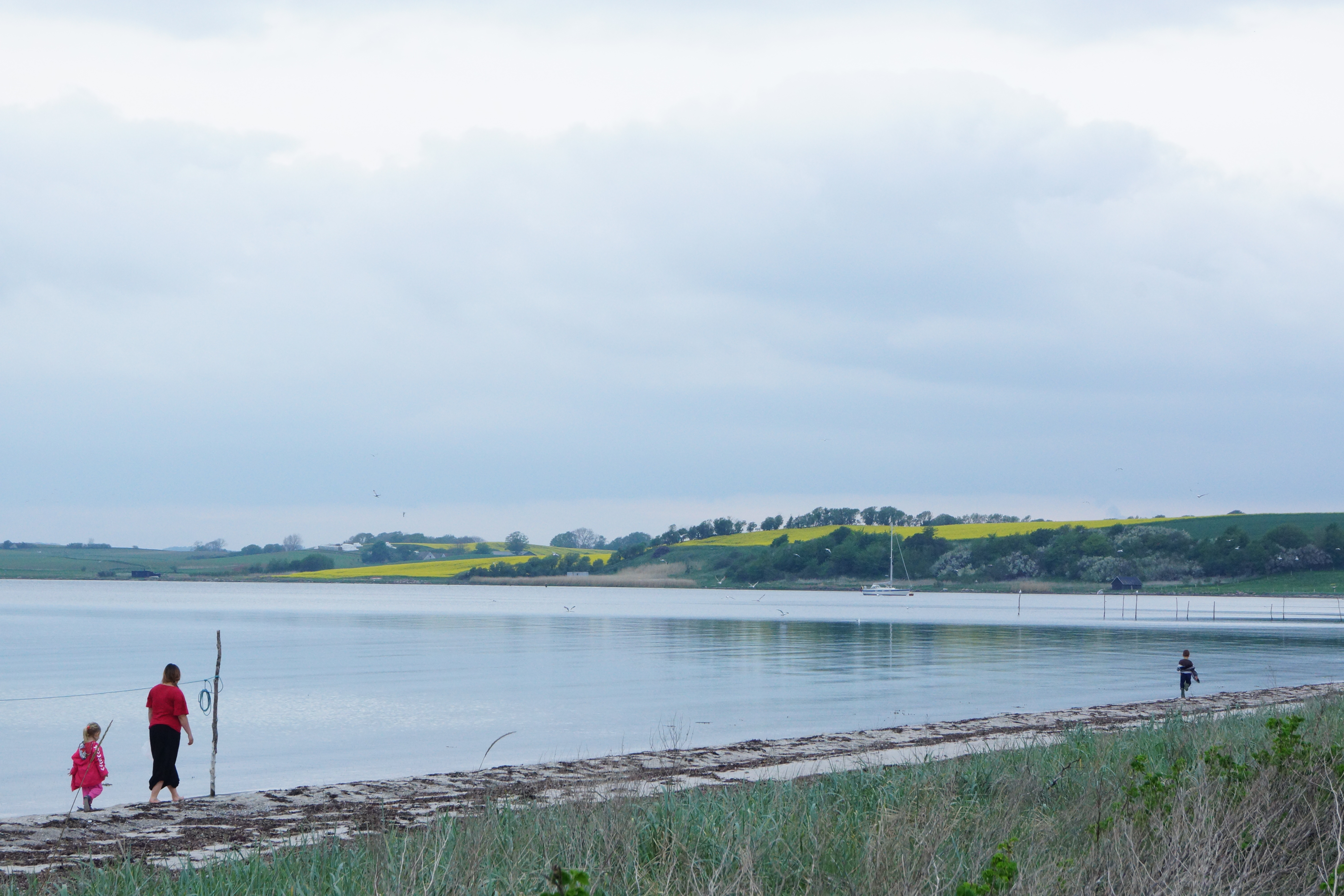
Bight of Begtrup

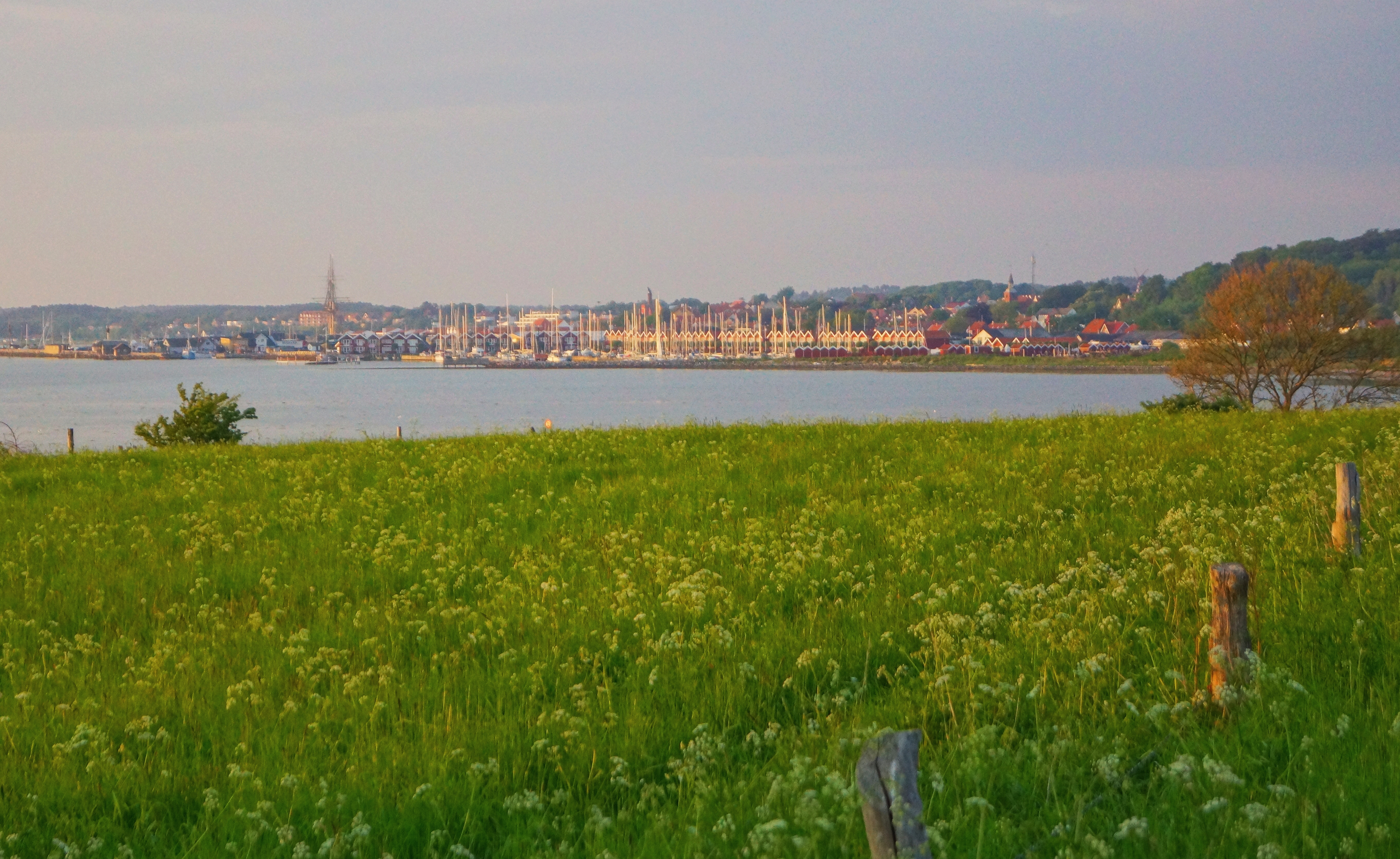
Bight of Ebeltoft

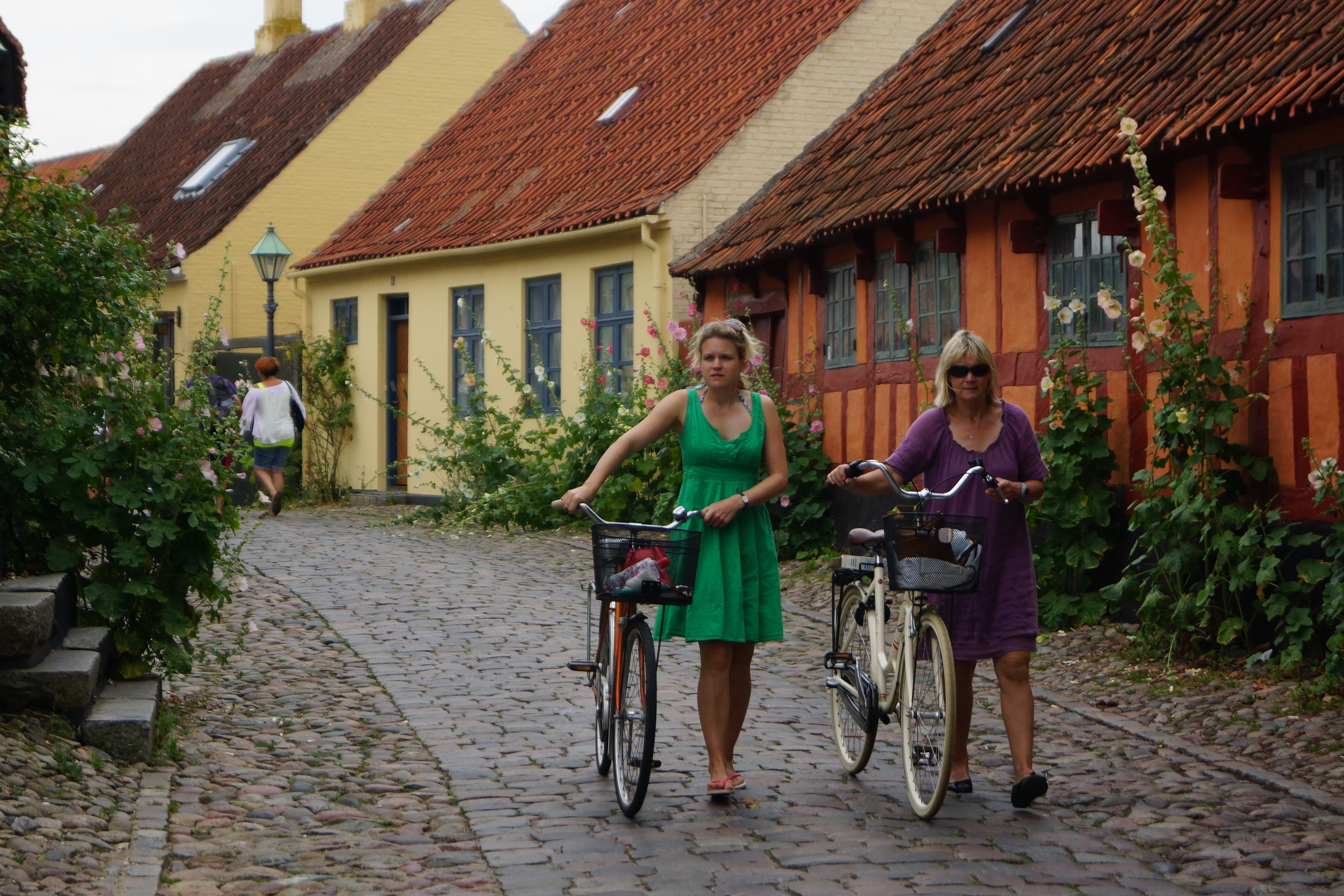
Old town, Ebeltoft

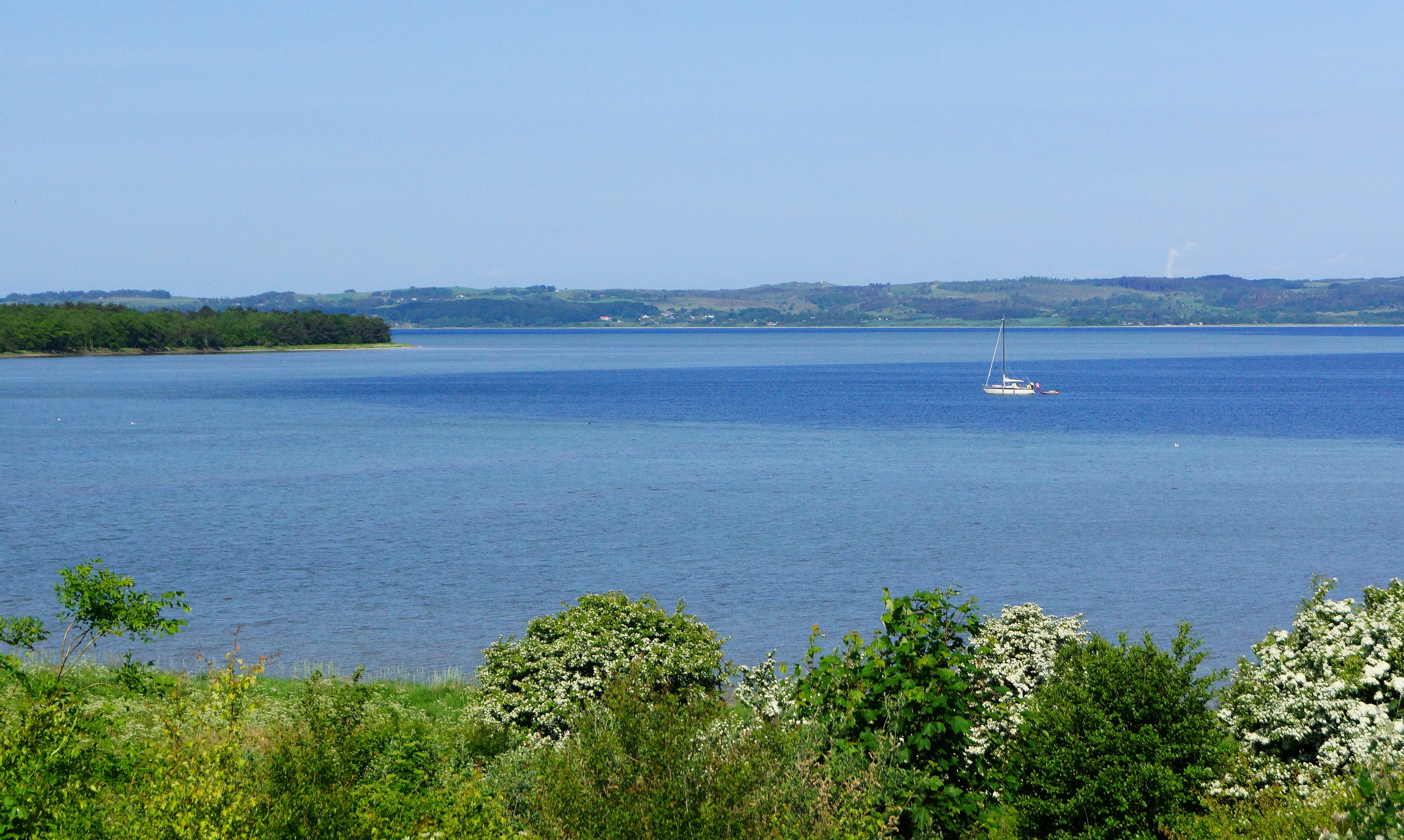
Bight of Ebeltoft

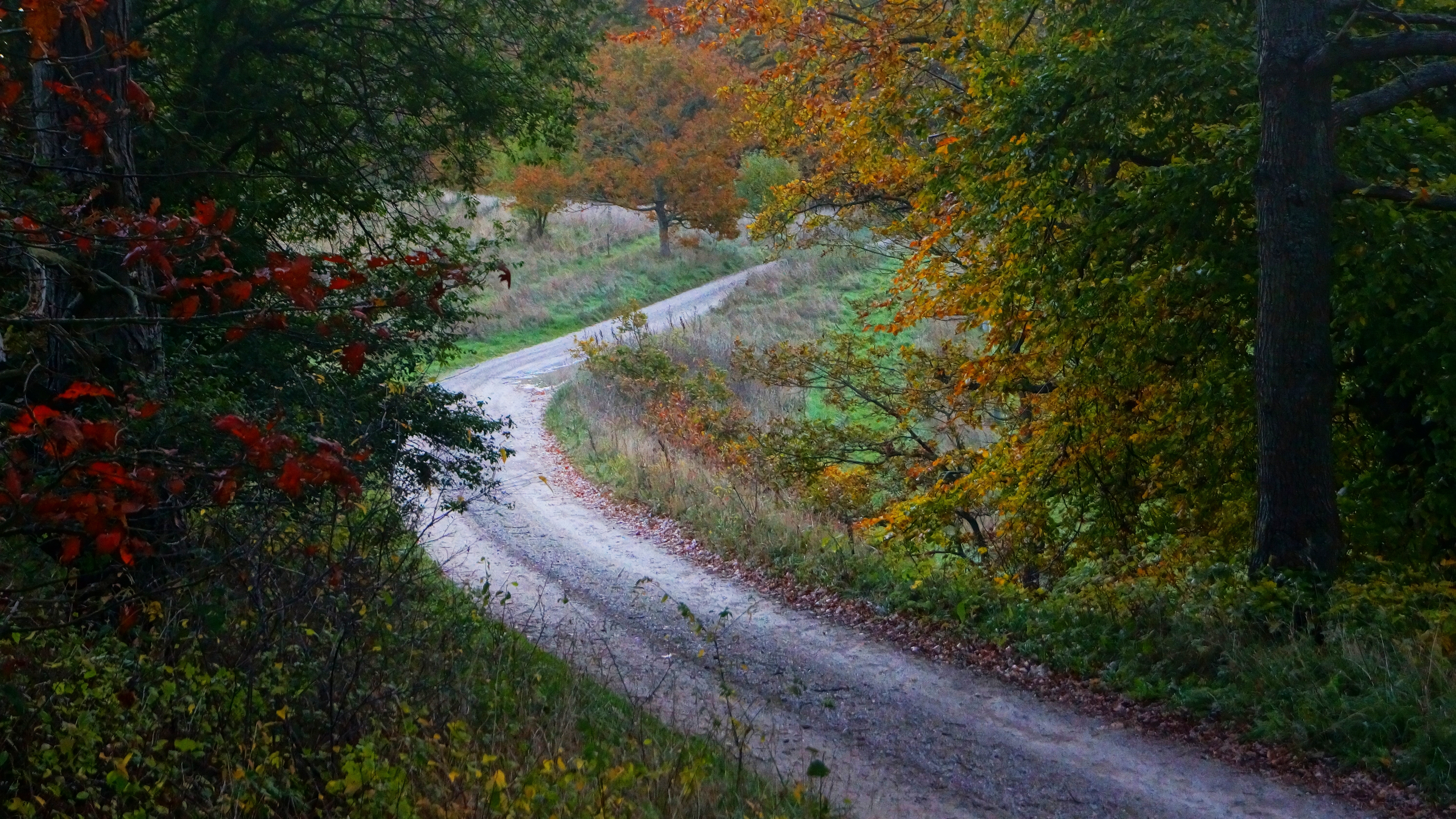
Central Mols
