= Stabelhøje =

Bronze Age Mounds in Denmark

View from Bronze Age Mound, Stabelhøje, Denmark.
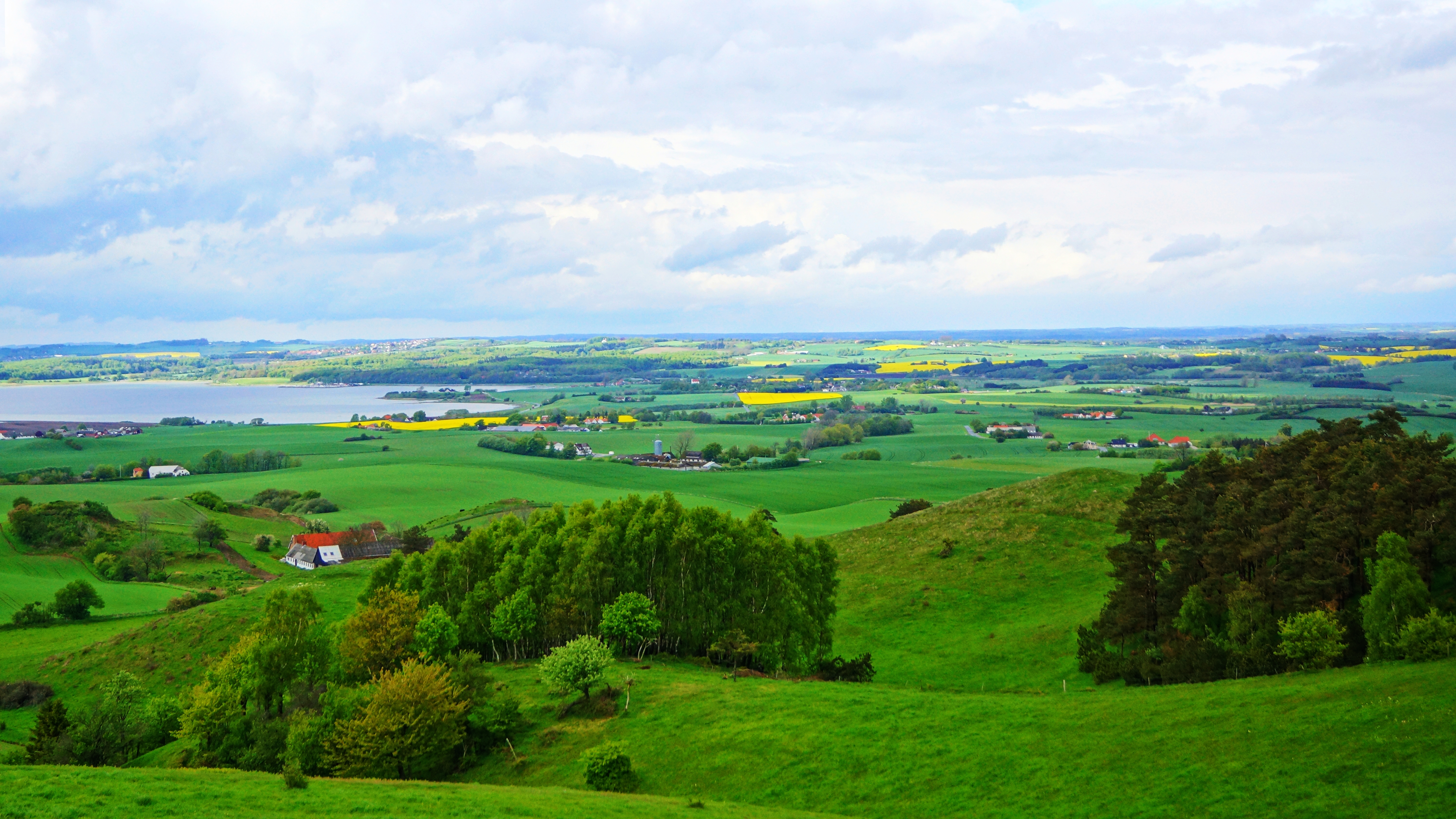
- Direction west towards Bay of Aarhus and Jutland.

- Location within Denmark
- Location: Syddjurs Municipality
- Nearest city: Ebeltoft
- Coordinates: 56°14′26.88″N 10°31′45.15″E

Stabelhøje or Stabel Høje (English: The Stacked Mounds) are two Bronze Age Mounds 135 meters and 133 meters above sea level by the village Agri in Mols Bjerge (Hills of Mols) on the peninsula Djursland in Denmark at the entrance to The Baltic Sea in Northern Europe. The burial mounds date back to the early Bronze Ages 1800–1000 years B.C. These hills are some of the more known view points in Mols Bjerge National Park. Other view points in the area are Agri Baunehøj, Trehøje, Ellemandsbjerg and Jernhatten.

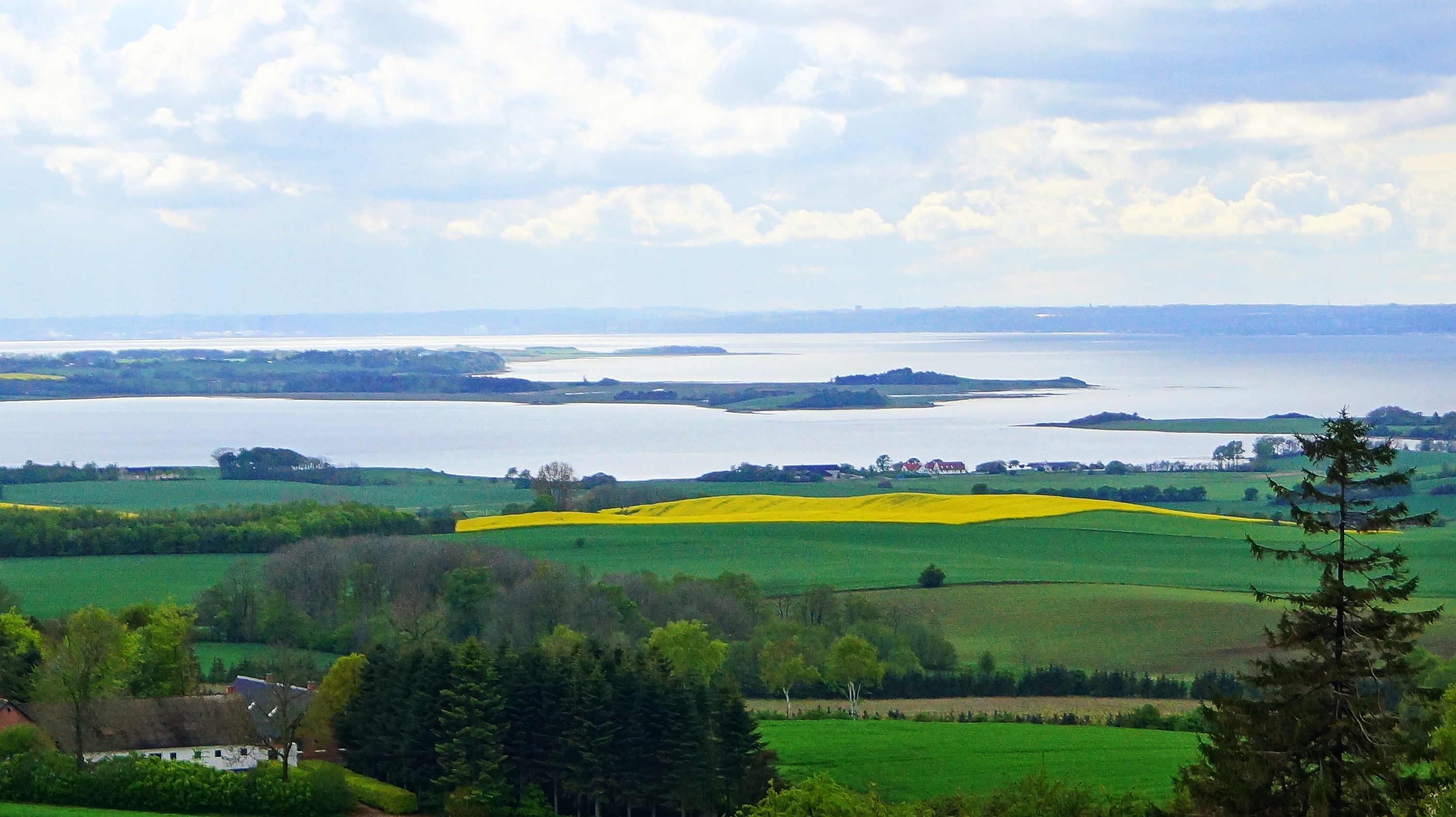
View from Stabelhøje, south-west, across Knebel Vig and Aarhus Bay towards Aarhus and the west coast of Jutland.

In the early Bronze Ages tribal leaders and other important members of society where buried in mounds placed in coffins made from hollowed out oak tree trunks. According to archaeological findings the burial customs changed during the Bronze Ages from coffin burials in oak trunks to cremation in the late Danish Bronze Ages. Probably due to international influence caused by long-distance trade with commodities such as copper, tin and cattle. This change in burial customs is probably also the case at Stabelhøje, that most likely hold several generations of burials from different Bronze Age time periods.

From the top of the mounds there is a view to Kalø Castle Ruin in Egens Bay – part of Aarhus Bay, and to the coast of Jutland, with Aarhus, Denmark's second largest town, in the distance. One can also see the hilly fields of southern Djursland, and the unfarmed hills of protected central Mols, including the tallest hill in the area, Agri Baunehøj, 137 meters above sea level. There is also a view of Ebeltoft Bay, and of the southernmost peninsula on Djursland, Helgenæs. The difference in elevation is accentuated by views that go all the way down to the surface of the sea.

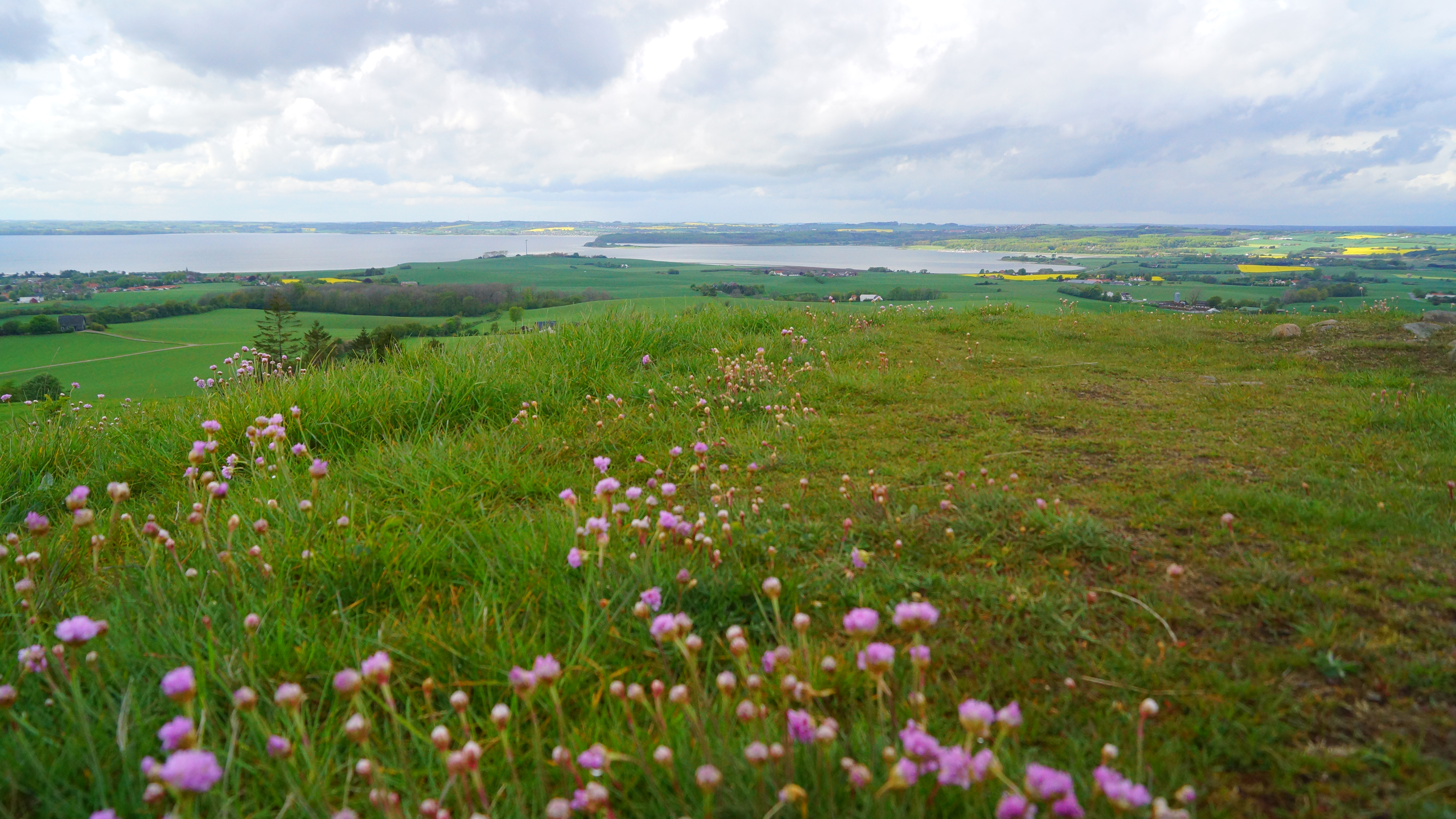
Flowering thrift at the top of the southernmost Stabelhøje. The vegetation on mounds can be special and varied, caused by a dry and warm south side, and a moist and shady north side.

Stabelhøje is accessible via small country roads. There is an infoboard at a small parking lot by the mounds. From here there is a short walk to the top of the southernmost of the two mounds. The mounds are 5–6 meters tall. Each is built of up to 650.000 rectangles of turf that where cut out by hand, corresponding to 7 ha (17 acres) of peeled heath- and grass-turf per mound. Under influence of rain draining through the surface of the mounds many of the Danish Bronze Age mounds have developed a hard mineral rich layer of soil close to the surface, that isolates the inner mound from contact with water and oxygen from the outside. This lid of hardened soil has helped preserve the artifacts insides the mounds over the centuries.

The construction of Bronze Age mounds such as Stabelhøje is an undertaking that involved the work of many people using primitive pre-iron-age tools. A feat that is part of the creation of the 60.000 Stone- and Bronze Age burial mounds registered in Denmark. It has been calculated that 100–150 mounds were built each year at the height of this endeavor in the early Danish Bronze Ages, 1800–500 B.C. Something that points to an organized 2500- to 3800-year-old pre Christian culture pervaded by a unified religious belief.

== Literature ==
- Naturstyrelsen.dk http://naturstyrelsen.dk/media/nst/89792/Mols%20Bjerge_221113_Web.pdf
- Morten D.D. Hansen (2009): Naturhistorier fra Nationalpark Mols Bjerge Naturhistorisk Museum Aarhus
- Sandmarkers kultur- og naturhistorie i Nationalpark Mols Bjerge Kulturarvsstyrelsen (2008)
