= Jernhatten =

Hill and view point in Denmark

Jernhatten The Iron Hat
- Hill
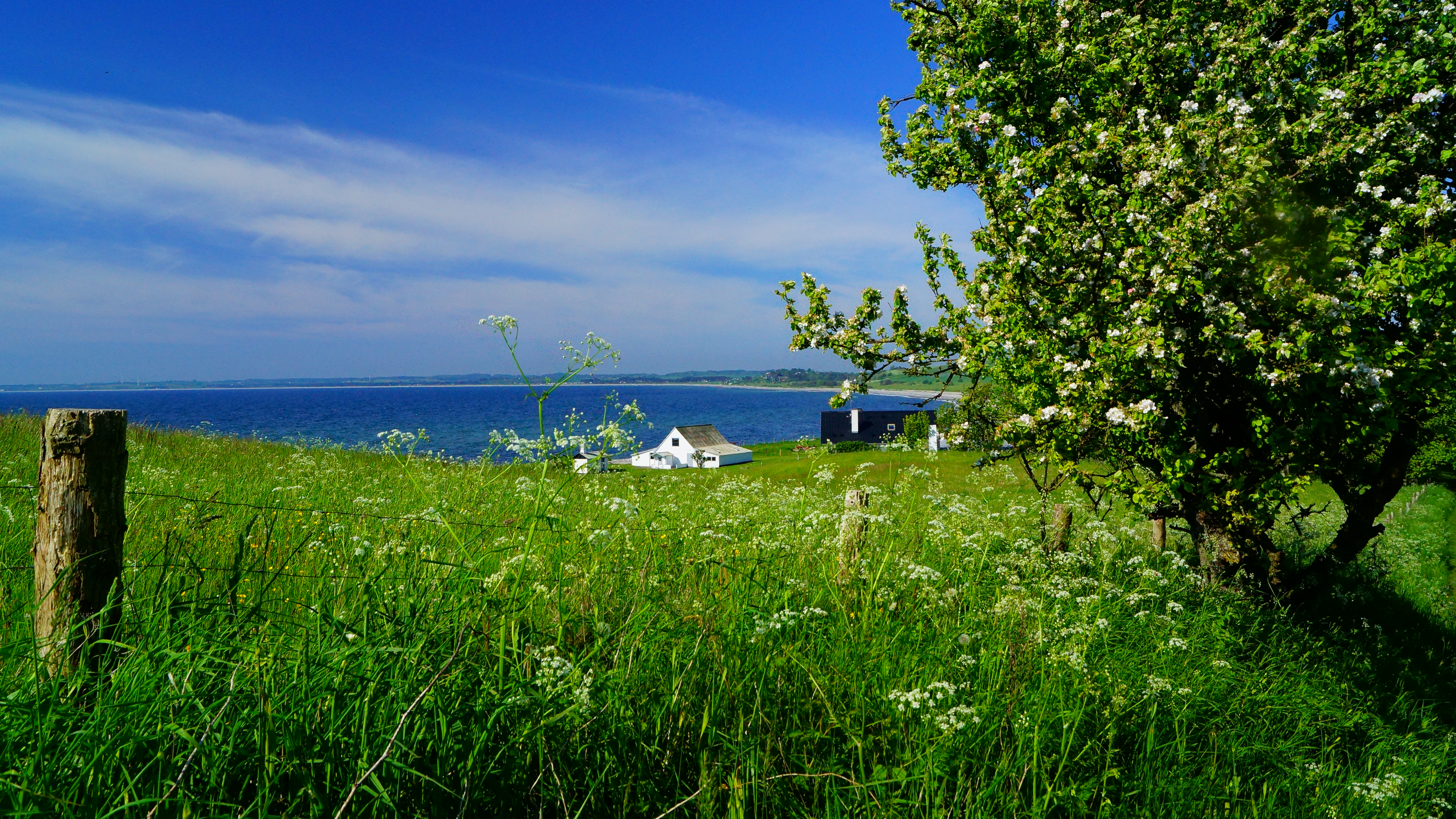
- View towards Bay of Draaby, from path to the top of Jernhatten.

- Jernhatten in Denmark
- Coordinates: 56°10′N 10°45′E
- Location: Syddjurs, Central Denmark (Midtjylland), Denmark

Jernhatten (lit. 'The Iron Hat') is a protected hill and view point on the Djursland peninsula in Denmark which protrudes into the Kattegat sea between Denmark and Sweden. From the top of the hill, 49 meters above sea level, there is a view up and down the coast including and the island Hjelm as well as an inland view over the hilly southern Djursland area, called Mols.

Part of the hill became a protected public area in 1927, and was expanded in 1979 to cover 235 hectares. Today, the hill is within Mols Bjerge National Park, a reserve covering 180 square kilometres.

== Geography ==
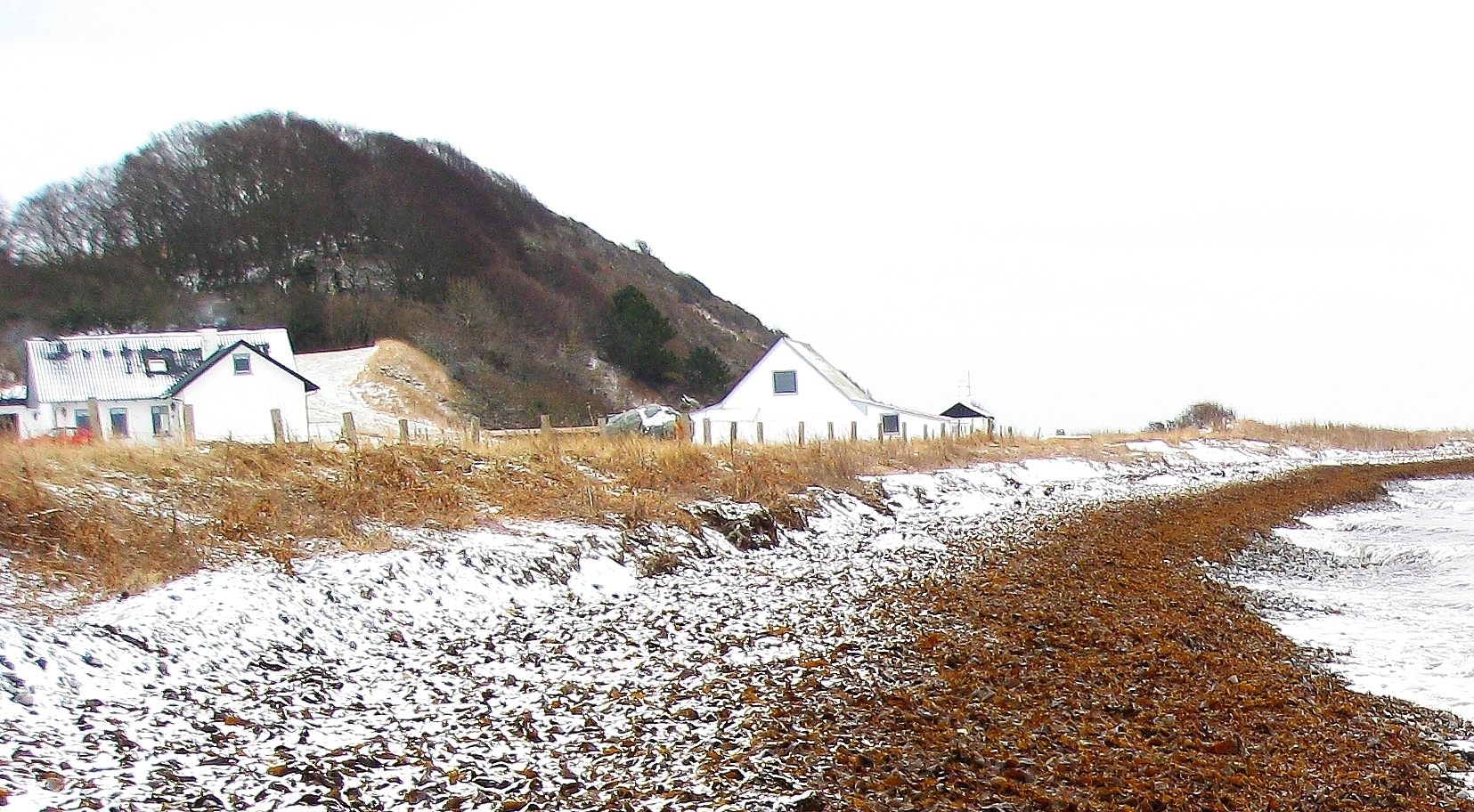
Jernhatten, seen from the sea, winter

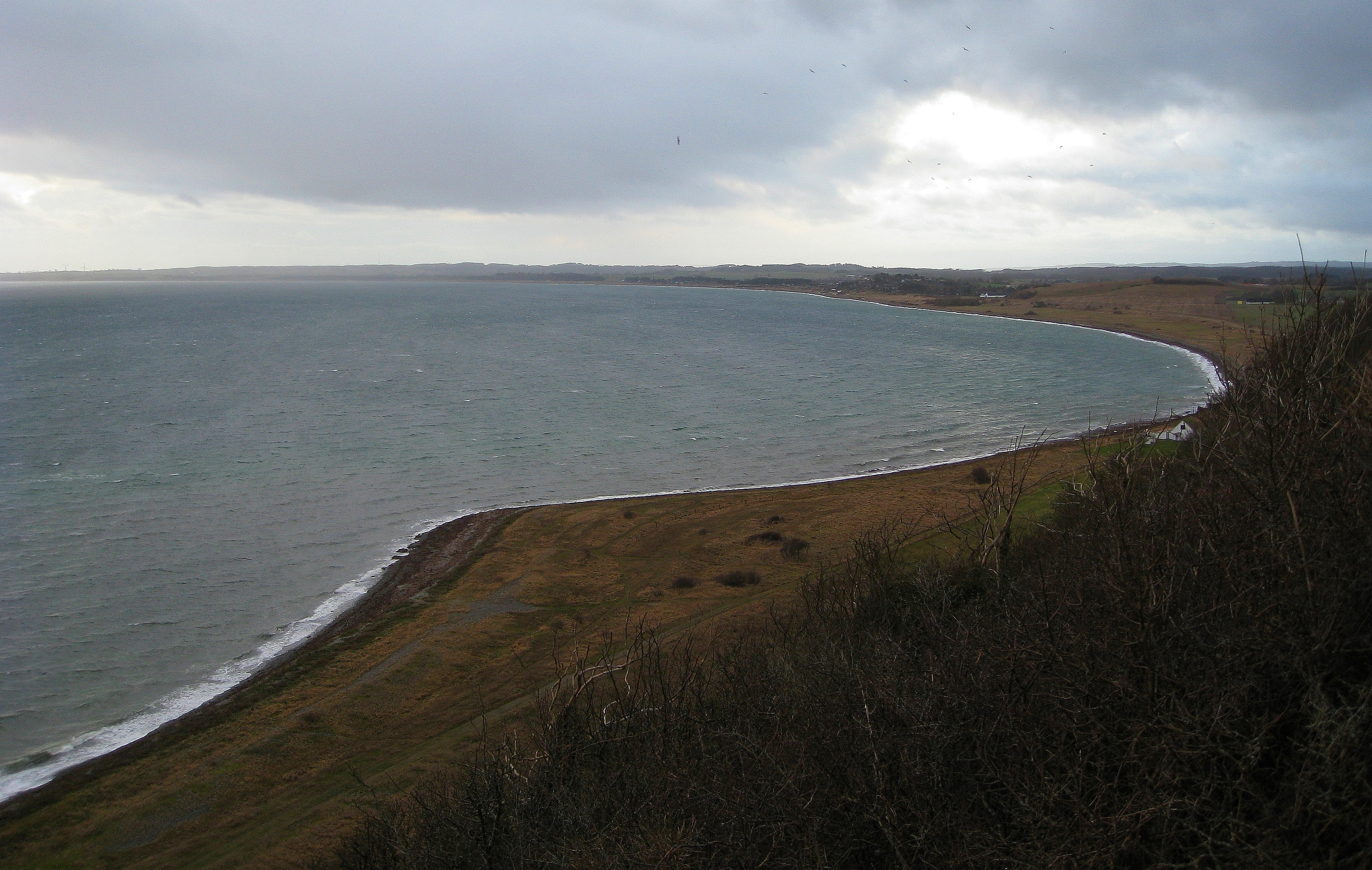
View, south from top, Bay of Draaby, winter

According to legend, Jernhatten was formed when a troll named Arn threw a stone at a troll on the island of Hjelm. In retaliation, the troll threw a stone back at Arn which missed its target, but was so large that Arn died of fright. He fell, dead, where he had been when he threw the stone. His body thus formed the ridge along the coast of the area, with his helmet creating Jernhatten. The hill and the nearby island of Hjelm may in fact be named for the resemblance of their domed shapes to war helmets. It is also speculated that the name of Jernhatten instead refers to the hard rock of the hill that has withstood erosion from the sea.

The coastal hill Jernhatten is located in the driest part of Denmark and receives more sunshine. This gives a microclimate that favors vegetation with similarities to what can be seen in South-Eastern Europe. At the wind exposed top of the hill there is stunted beech tree growth with anemone, ivy, and wild apple trees. The northern and eastern part of the hill merges into a common, maintained through grazing, with primrose blossom in spring. At the foot of the hill lies an elevated beach plain resulting from land uplift due to release of pressure when the heavy ice sheet covering large parts of Denmark melted away 10,000 years ago at the end of the last ice-age.

The coast down from Jernhatten is known among anglers and divers, due to a varied sea bed with kelp and stones, giving favorable conditions for fish life. The nearby rock reef is also popular among scuba divers. In the same area, there are also remnants from the English Wars.

== Hiking ==
From a small car park to the top of the hill there is a 300 meter footpath leading to the main viewpoint. The area is not overrun. A longer walk is over the top of the hill down along the coast to the coastal hills of Rugaard Forest, which can be seen from the viewpoint, going back the same way. This 8 kilometer round trip passes empty coastline and wooded hills with wellsprings running into the sea, and trees falling out over the stony beach and into the sea.

On this stretch there is also a hill with angled beech trees, growing on unstable ball clay, that is slipping into the sea. The tidal difference in the area is normally negligible in the order of one foot, so one does not have to worry about being cut of, even though the beach down from Rugaard Forest is narrow to pass at some places. From Jernhatten and north the coastline is varied and empty up to the coastal town Grenaa and Grenaa Beach 20 kilometers further up the coast of Djursland. This stretch partly joins an international hiking and bicycle trail, the North Sea Trail, which starts in Sweden and ends Spain.

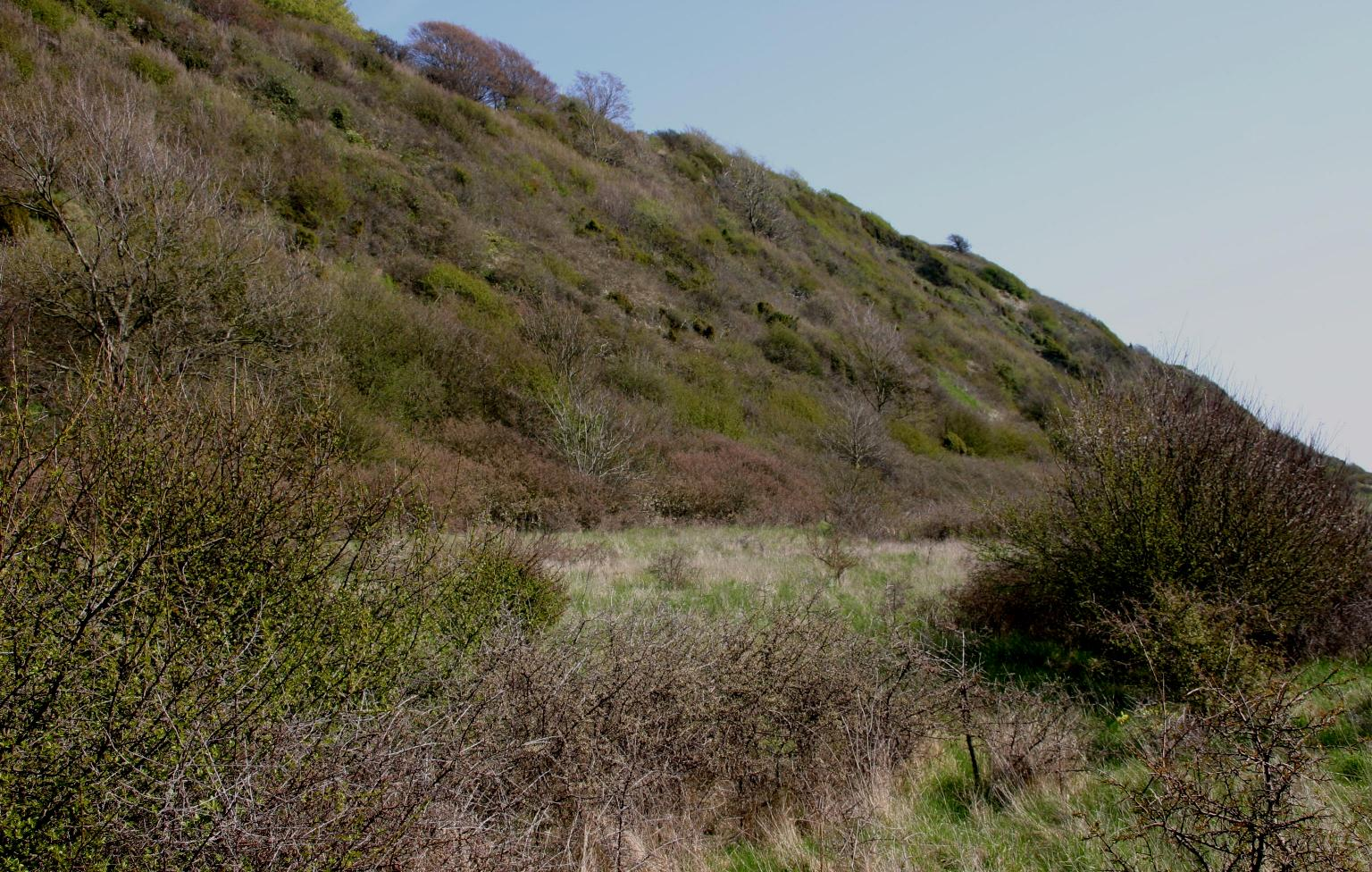
Jernhatten seen from south-west

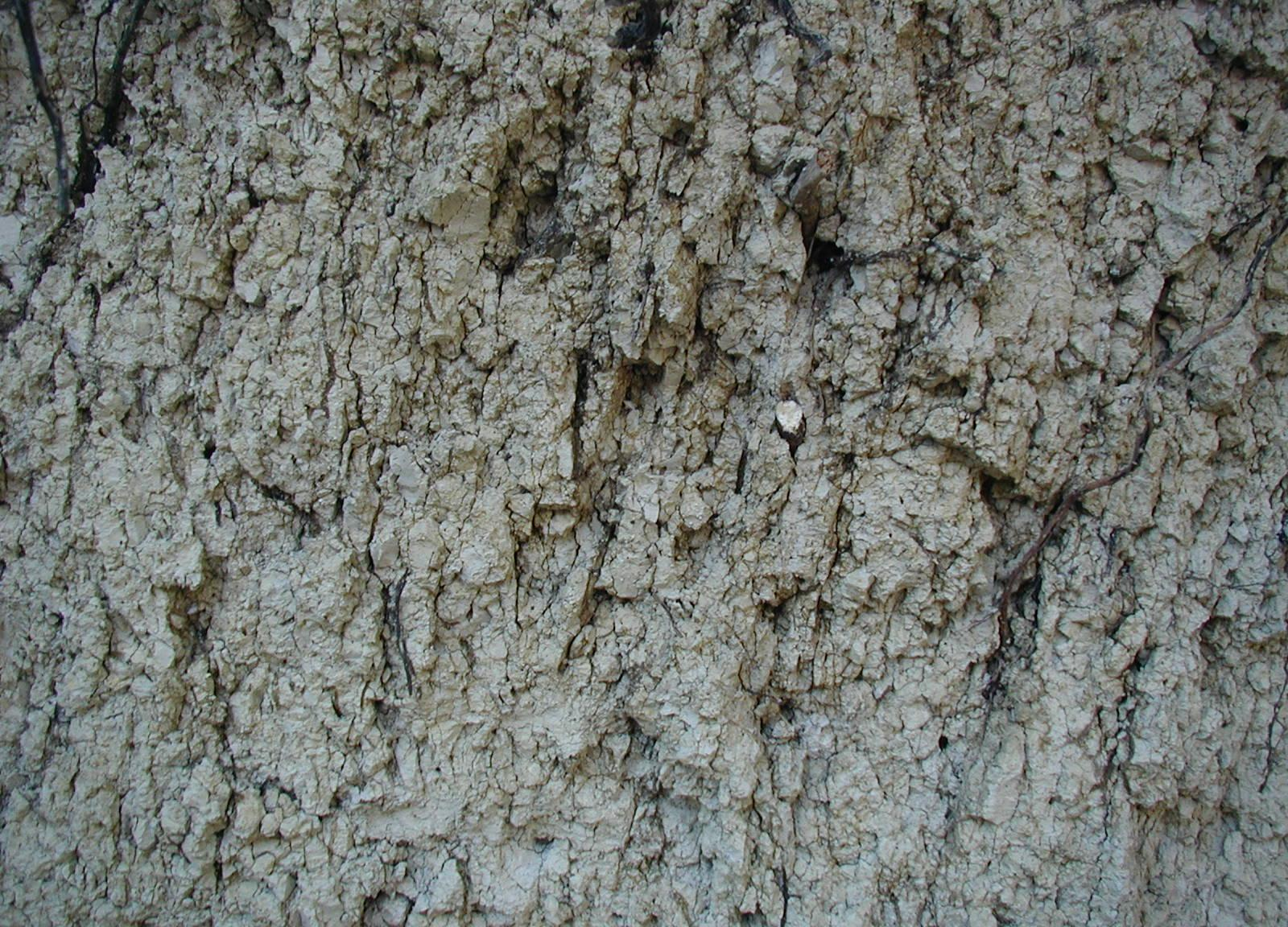
Marl-soil at Jernhatten

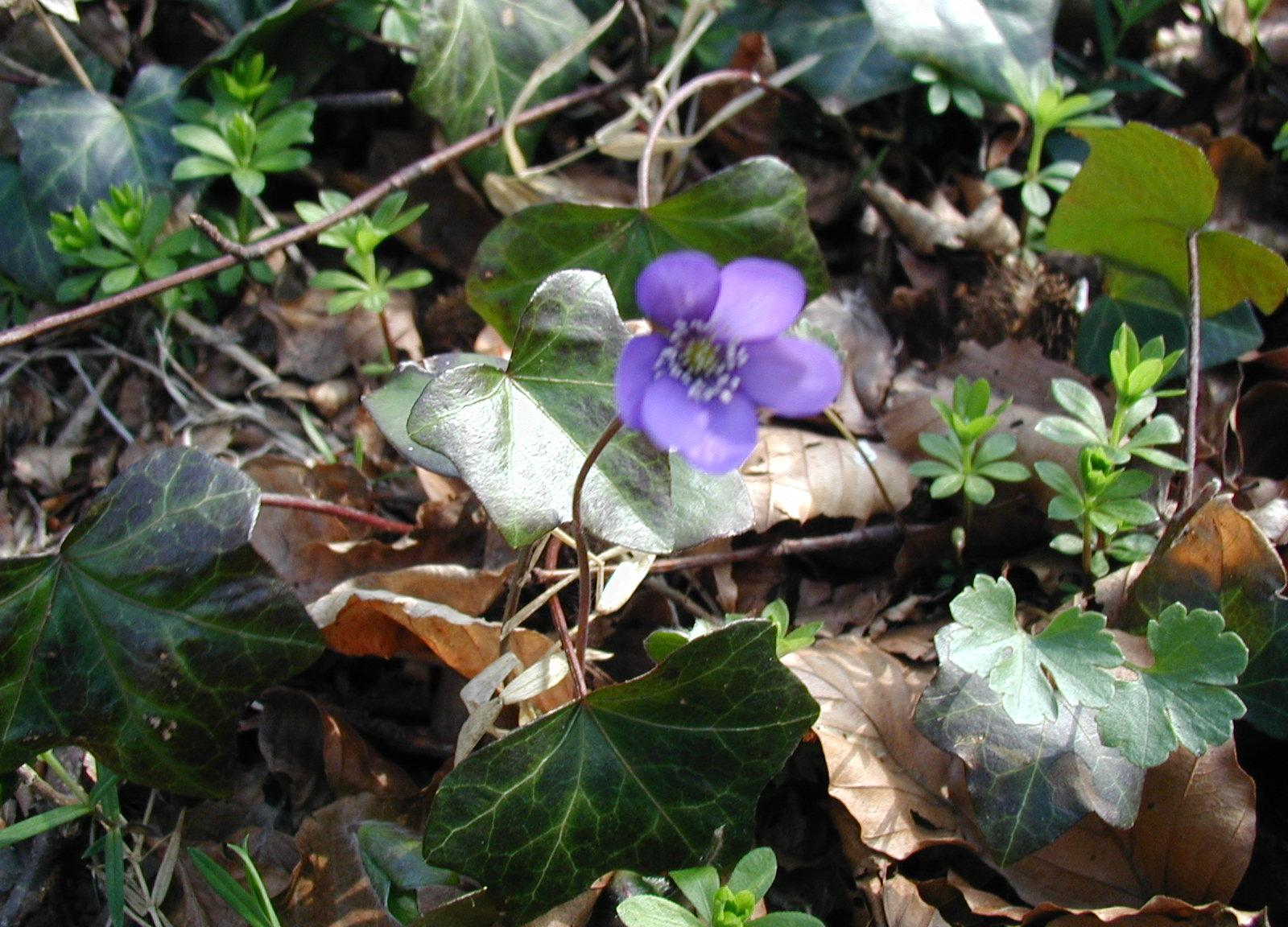
Vegetation at Jernhatten

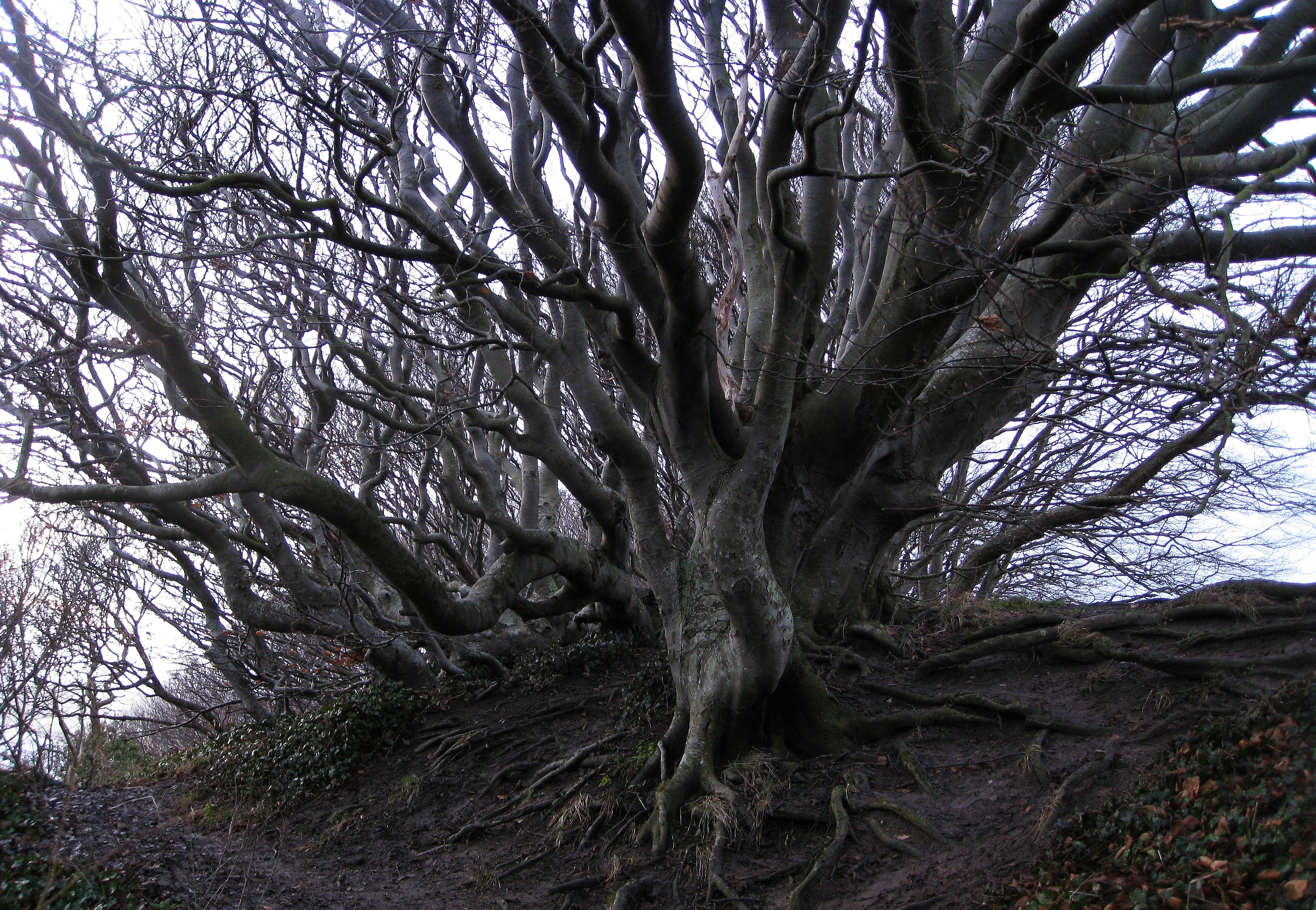
Wind stunted beech tree at the top of Jernhatten

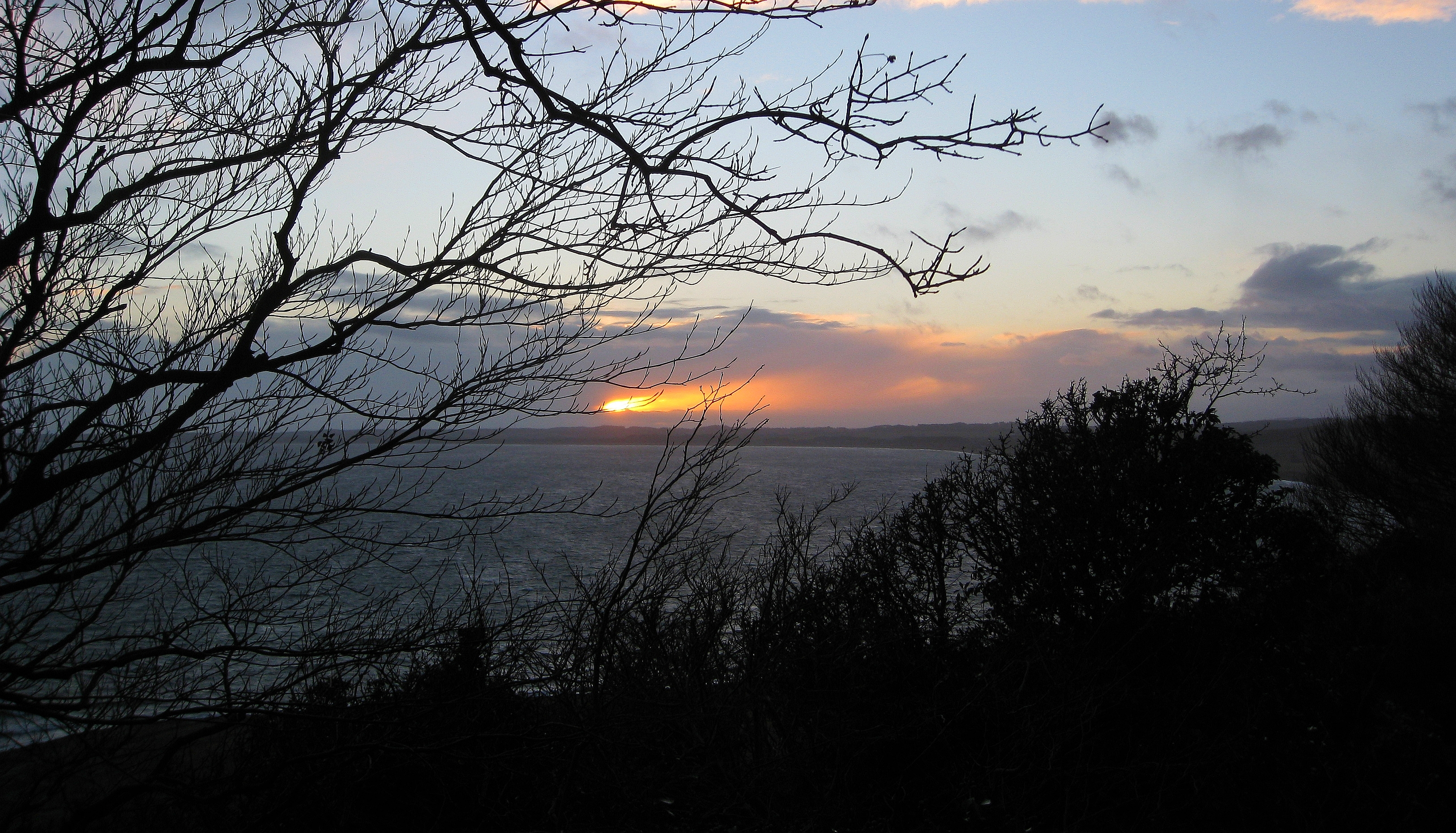
View from top, south, winter

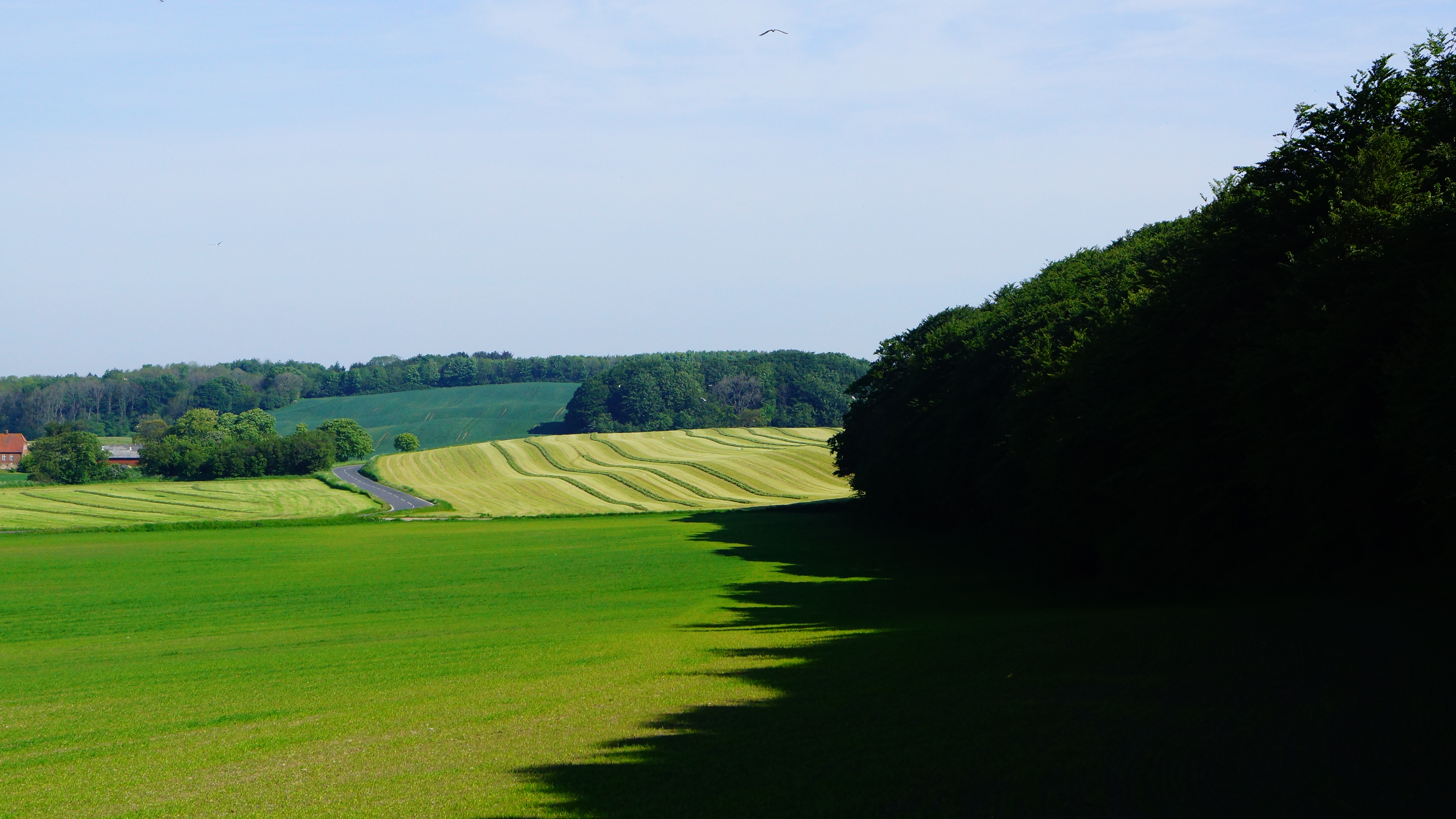
View, from path, direction inland

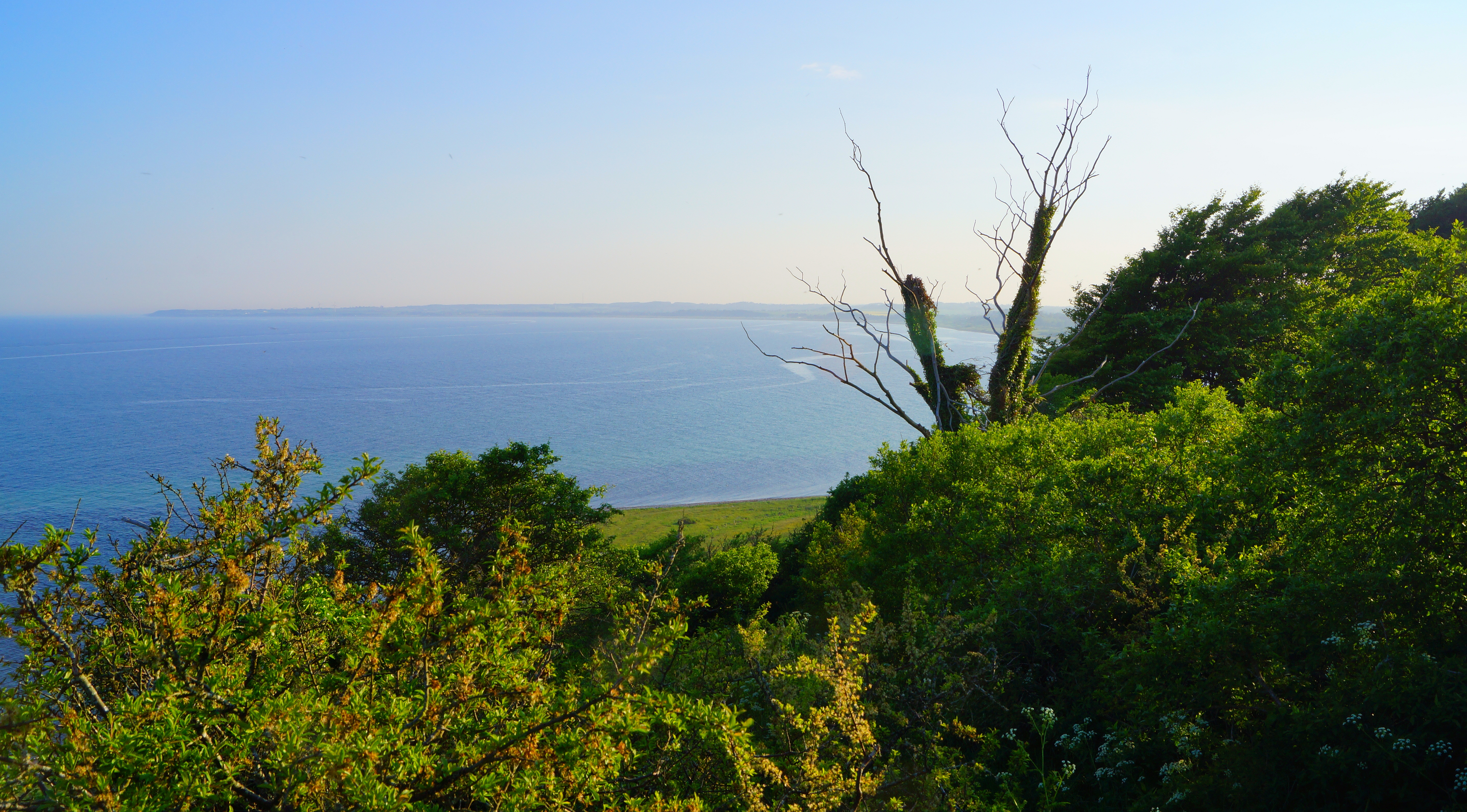
View, east from top

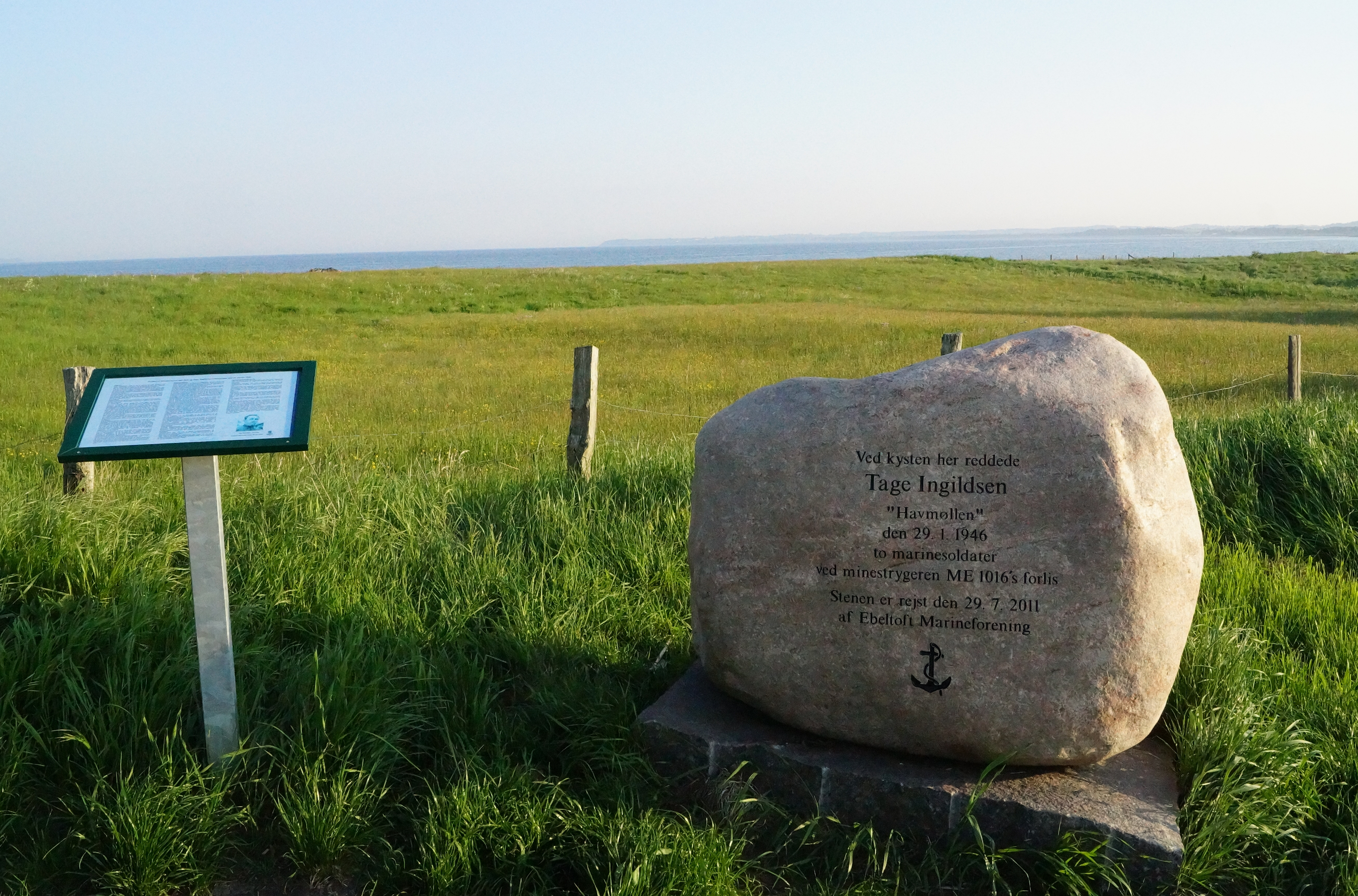
Jernhatten, memorial stone by the car park

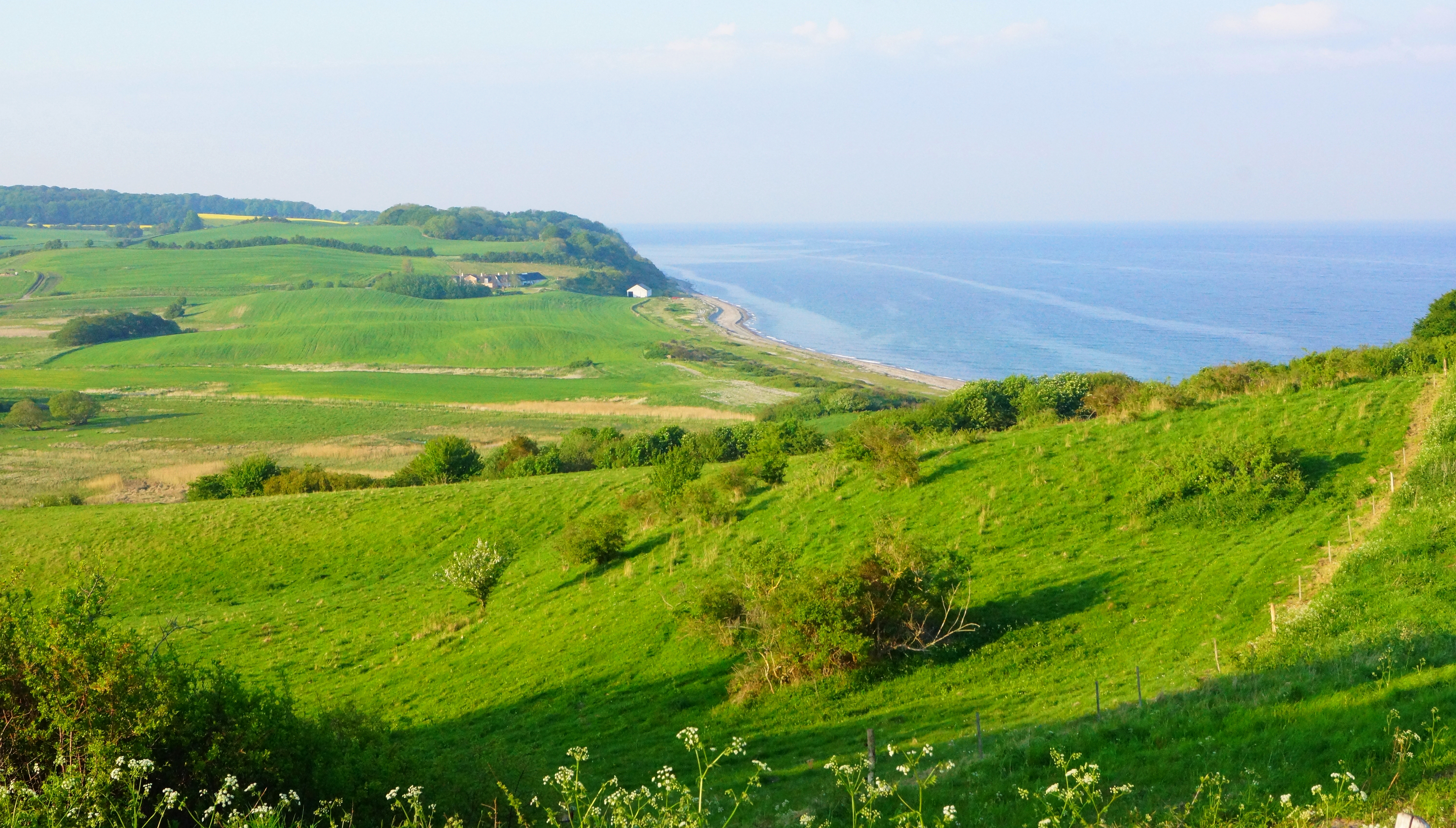
View to the north from the top
