= Agri Bavnehøj =

Hill in Denmark

Agri Bavnehøj, hill Barrow Mound, Denmark
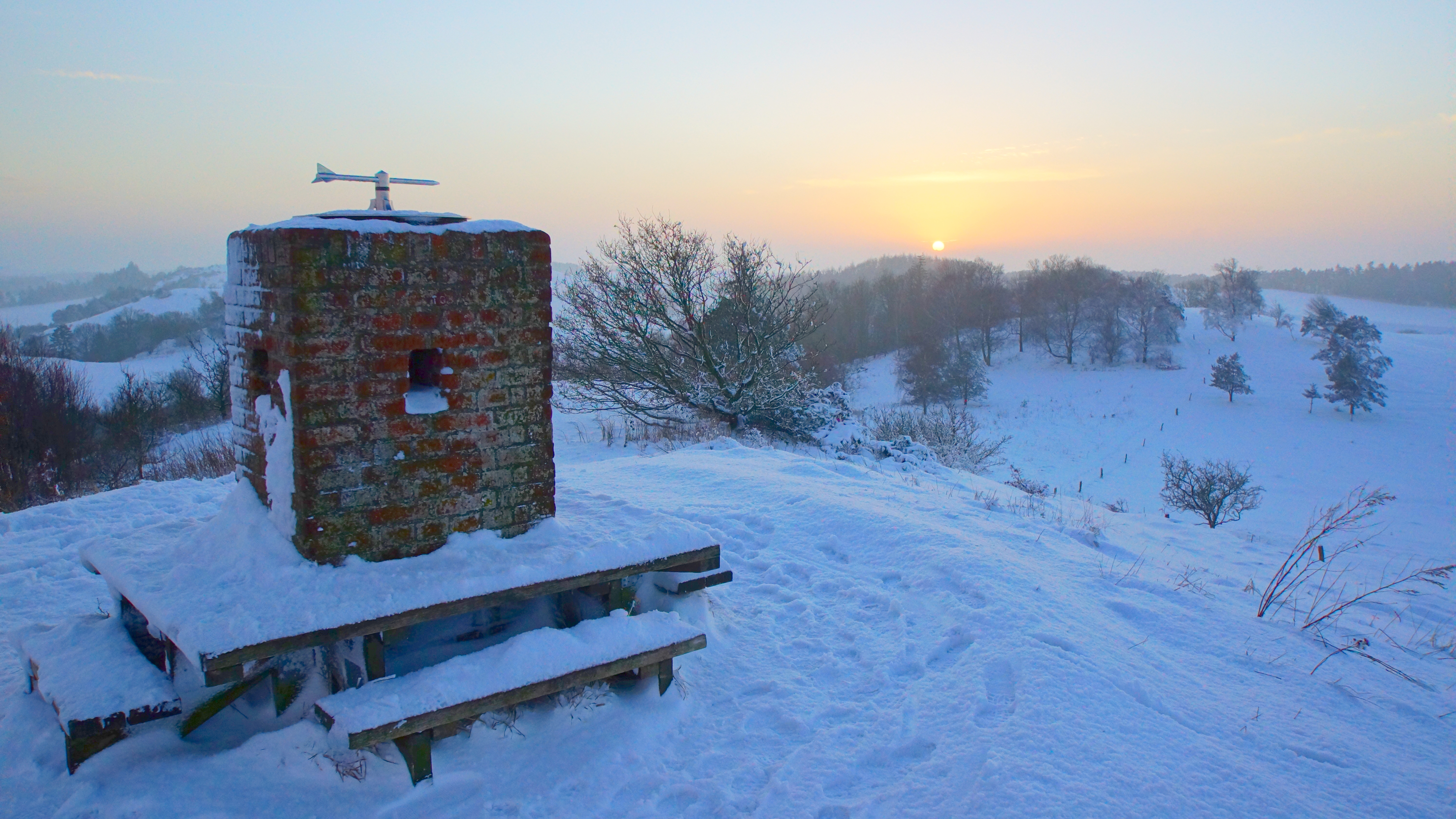
- Agri Bavnehøj is one of 4 barrow mounds and vista points in National Park Mols Bjerge

- Location within Denmark
- Location: Syddjurs Municipality
- Nearest city: Ebeltoft
- Coordinates: 56°13′48.30″N 10°32′12.10″E

Agri Bavnehøj (or Agri Bavnehoej) is a Danish hill and vista point with a bronze age burial mound, located 137 meters above sea level. It is close to the village of Agri, in Mols Bjerge National Park on the southern part of the Djursland peninsula, 40 kilometres (25 mi) northeast of Denmark’s second largest city, Aarhus. The mound was built 1800 – 1000 years BC. Agri Bavnehøj is the least known of four vista points and burial mounds on southern Djursland, despite being the highest (by a few meters). The others are Stabelhøje, Trehøje and Ellemandsbjerg.

== View ==
From the mound there is a view over Århus Bay, Jutland, Southern Djursland, Ebeltoft Bay, the Kattegat Sea and central parts of Mols Bjerge National Park. On a clear day one can also see across The Kattegat Sea to the island Zealand, where the Danish capital Copenhagen lies. Agri Bavnehøj is less than a kilometer east of another vista point, Stabelhøje, 135 meters above sea level, where the view is perhaps even better. The feeling of height is emphasized by the view being all the way down to sea level. The Agri Bavnehøj hill was formed by ice sheet movements 12.000 years ago in connection with the last ice age.

== Warning System ==
The old Danish word, bavn, in Bavnehøj, means stack of wood or fire placed on high ground. The bronze age people and their ancestors used Agri Bavnehøj and other hilltop barrows as part of a warning system, where one lit fires on hilltops to warn neighbour communities of dangers, such as invasions. The neighbours in return lit fires on their own designated hilltops, creating a telegraph chain of fires, spreading the word of unrest. This function was maintained all the way up to the 1800s - actually as late as in the Three Year War (Treårskrigen) 1848 -50, that amongst other things saw the withdrawal of the Danish general Olaf Rye’s army past Århus over southern Djursland to the peninsula Helgenæs that he fortified at the narrow Dragsmur passage 8 kilometers from Agri Bavnehøj. From Helgenæs Rye succeeded in shipping the army to Fredericia in the southern part of Jutland in Denmark, where the army was able to continue fighting, after having manoeuvred around the German front by sailing round it.

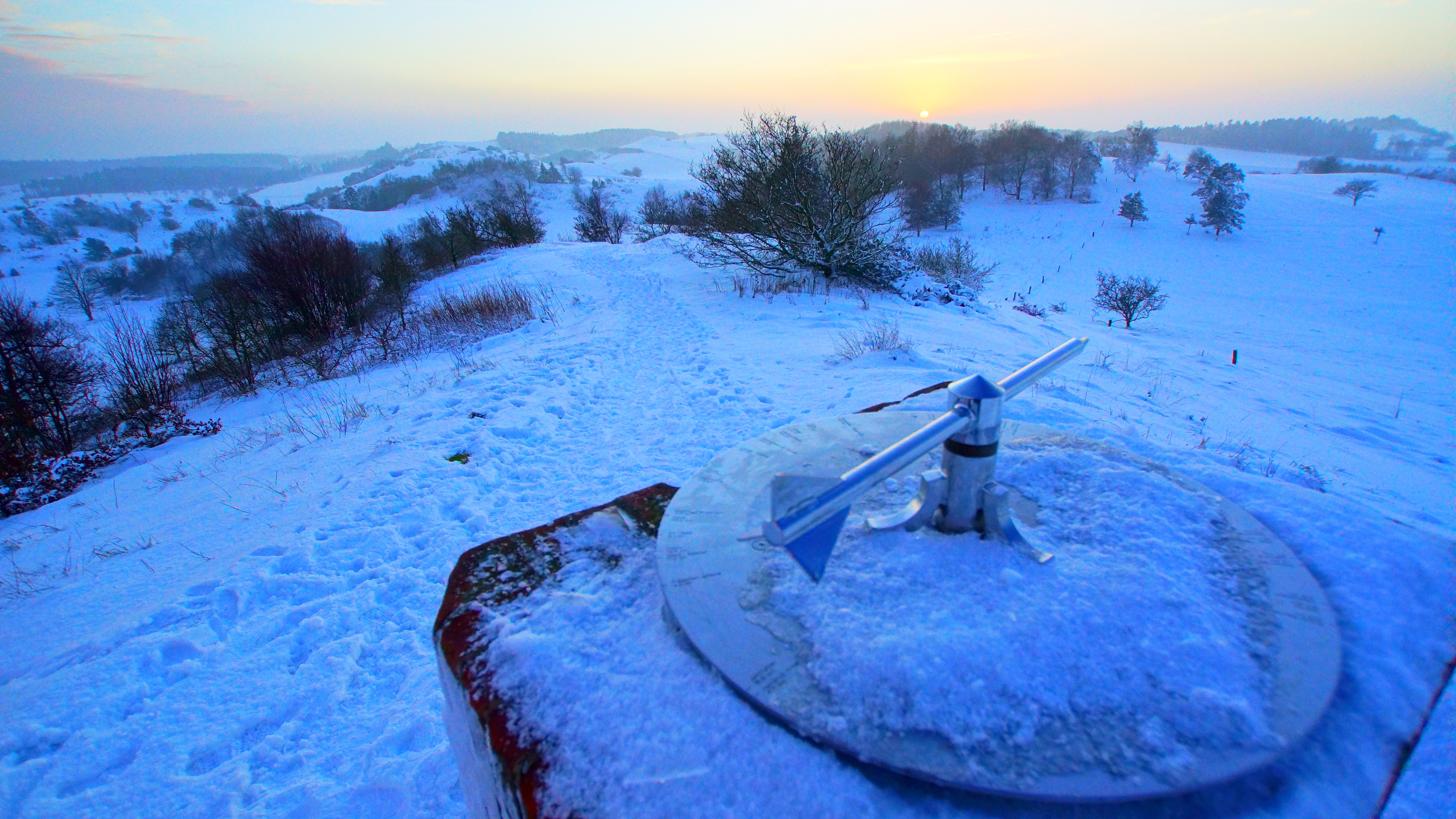
A 360 degree pointing device on Agri Bavnehøj helps to name points that can be seen from the hilltop mound.

== Cult ==
The burial mound on Agri Bavnehøj is made from approximately 650.000 blocks of stacked turf blocks giving the mound a height of 5 – 6 meters. Building a mound this seize corresponds to peeling the top turf away from around 7 hectares of land. The construction of large bronze age mounds such as Agri Bavnehøj is an undertaking that must have involved many people working with primitive pre-iron age tools. The Agri mound was part of a civilisation that built the 60.000 bronze age mounds registered in Denmark today. It has been calculated that in the bronze age period from 1800 – 500 BC, 100 – 150 burial mounds were built every year. This can be seen as a testimony to the existence of organized communities in a 2500 – 3800 year old pre Christian civilization, that must have had a pervasive religious belief containing a uniform concept of burial traditions.

== International ==
In the earliest part of the bronze age, tribal leaders and other important people were buried in the mounds encased in a hollowed out oak log. Often the mounds were used multiple times, with both early oak log burials and later urn burials found in the same mound. The Bronze Age in what is now Denmark was in many ways an international affair with import of copper and tin from far away for bronze production, and export of cattle. Archaeologists reckon that the burials changed from coffin burials to cremation due to international influence.

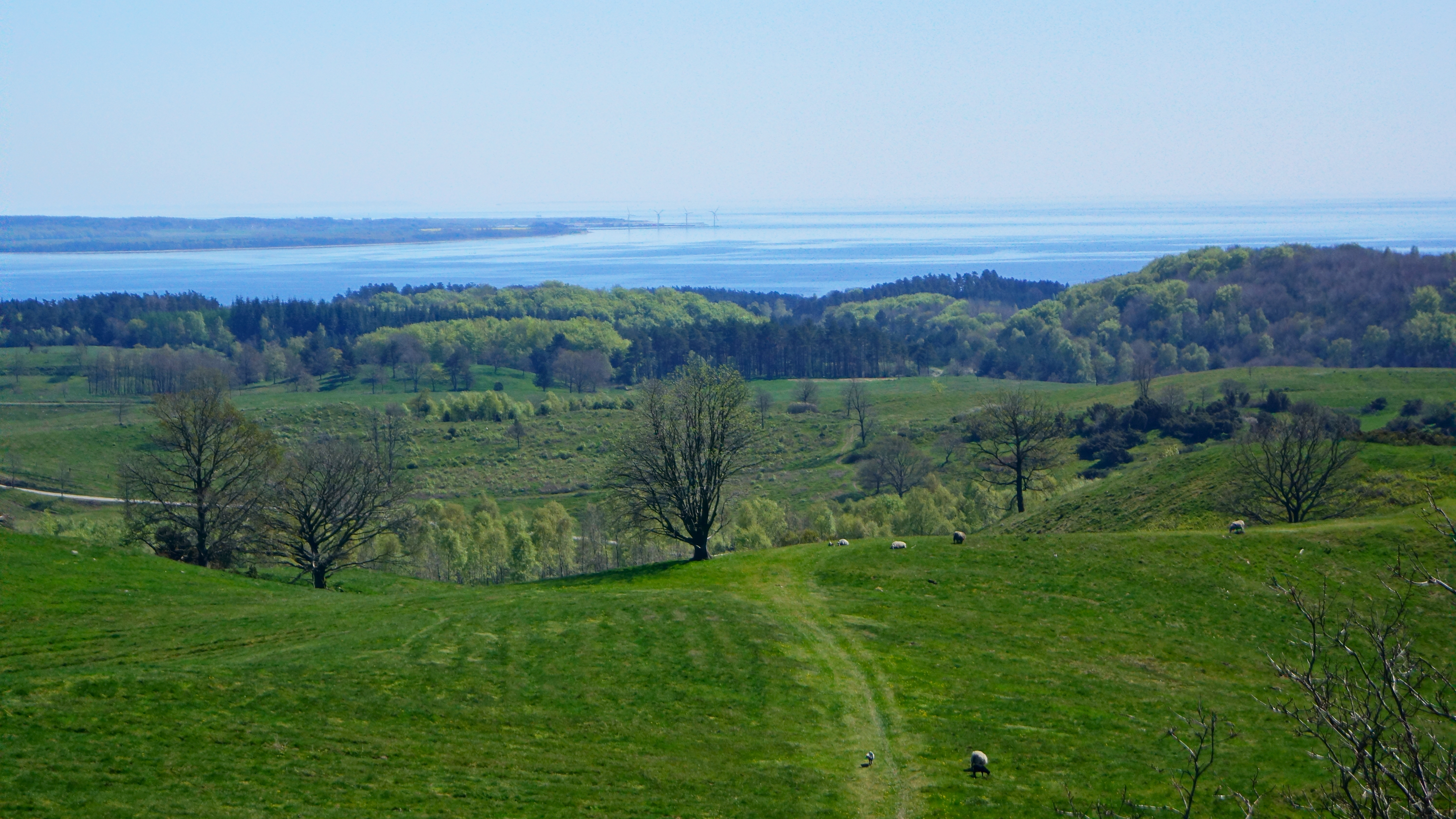
View from Agri Bavnehøj down towards Ebeltoft Bay

A hallmark of the turf built bronze age mounds is that a layer of metallic oxides tended to wash out from the top turf creating a hard and air tight cap isolating the inner mound from the atmosphere. This air tight lid prevents decay of the burials due to oxidation including protecting offerings accompanying the deceased inside the mounds.

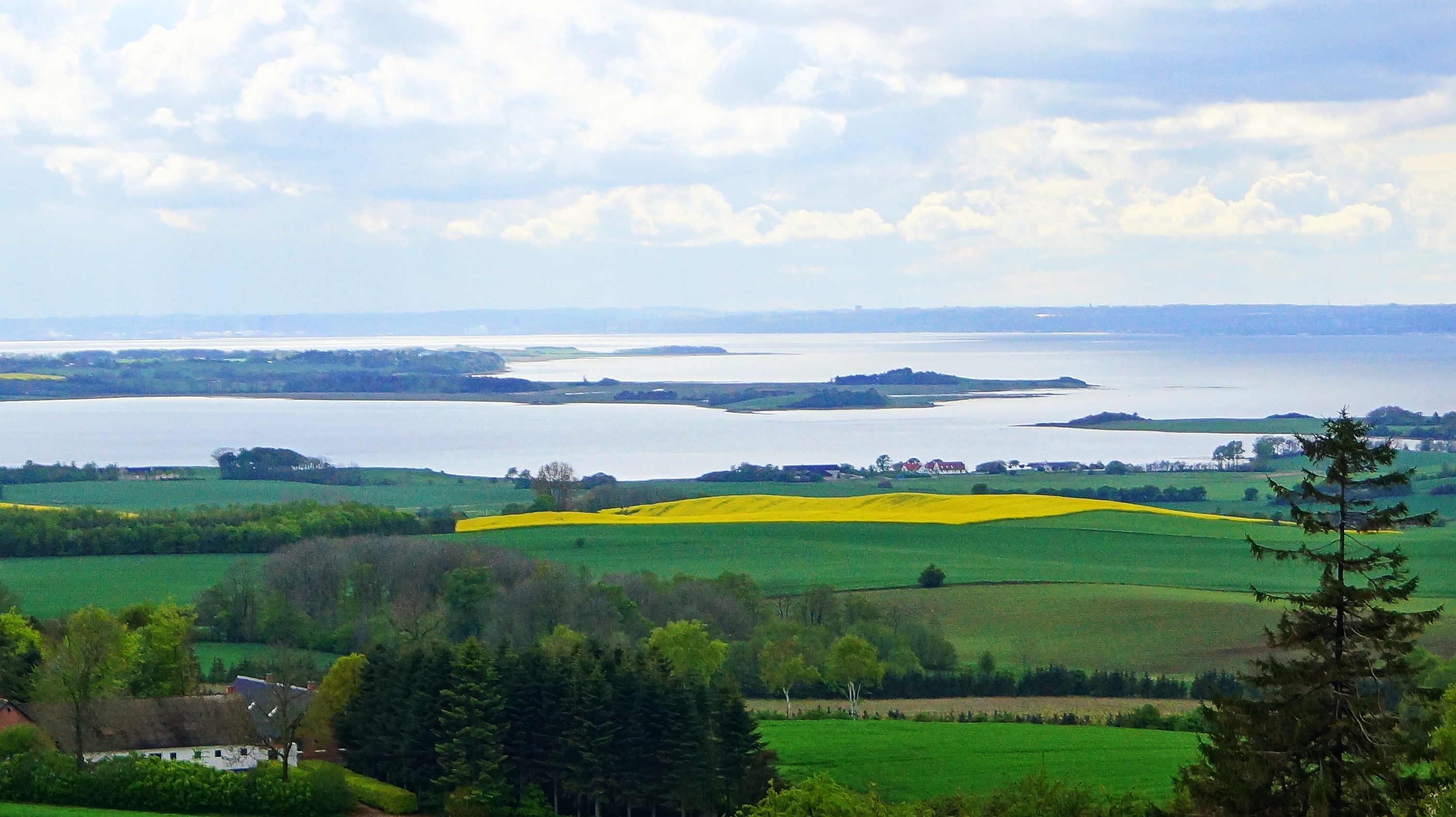
View from a neighboring mound, Stabelhøje, less than a kilometer from the Agri mound, gives a view of Knebel Bay, and Aarhus Bay.

== Location ==
Agri Bavnehøj is situated in the protected not farmed part of The National Park Mols Bjerge 13 kilometers from the partly tourism based coastal town, Ebeltoft. The hills are accessible by car via small country roads leading to a parking lot close to the mound, including an info-poster, benches and toilet facilities. Horseback riders often use the designated horse trailer parking facilities by Agri Bavnehøj as a starting point for rides in the park. From the facilities there is a footpath to the top of the mound. The hilly small roads up to Agri Bavnehøj traverse some of Denmark’s longest hills.
