= Helgenæs =

Peninsula in Denmark

- Peninsula
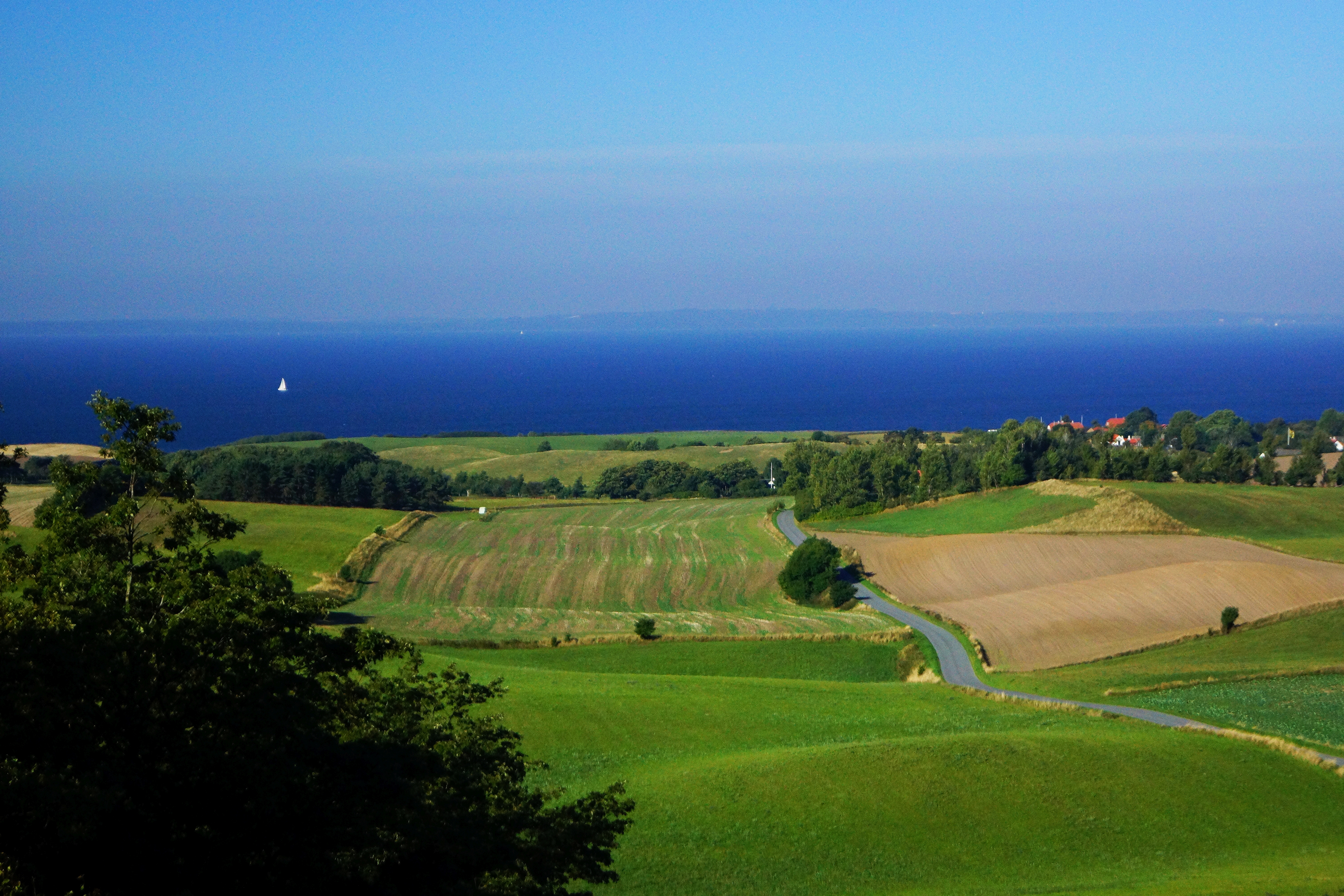
- View across the Bay of Aarhus as seen from the hill of Ellemandsbjerg.

- Location within Denmark
- Coordinates: 56°7′N 10°31′E
- Location: Djursland, Denmark

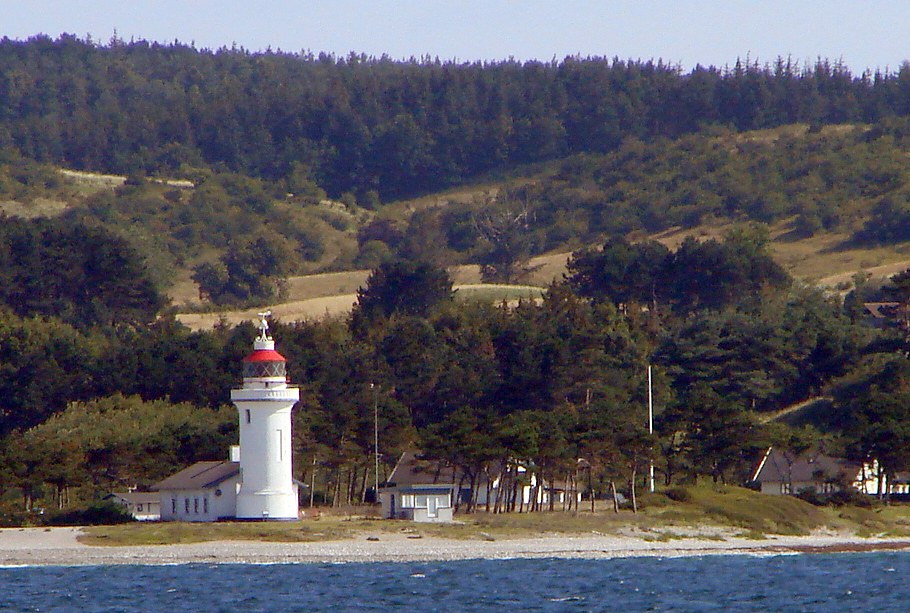
Sletterhage Lighthouse on the southern part of Helgenæs.

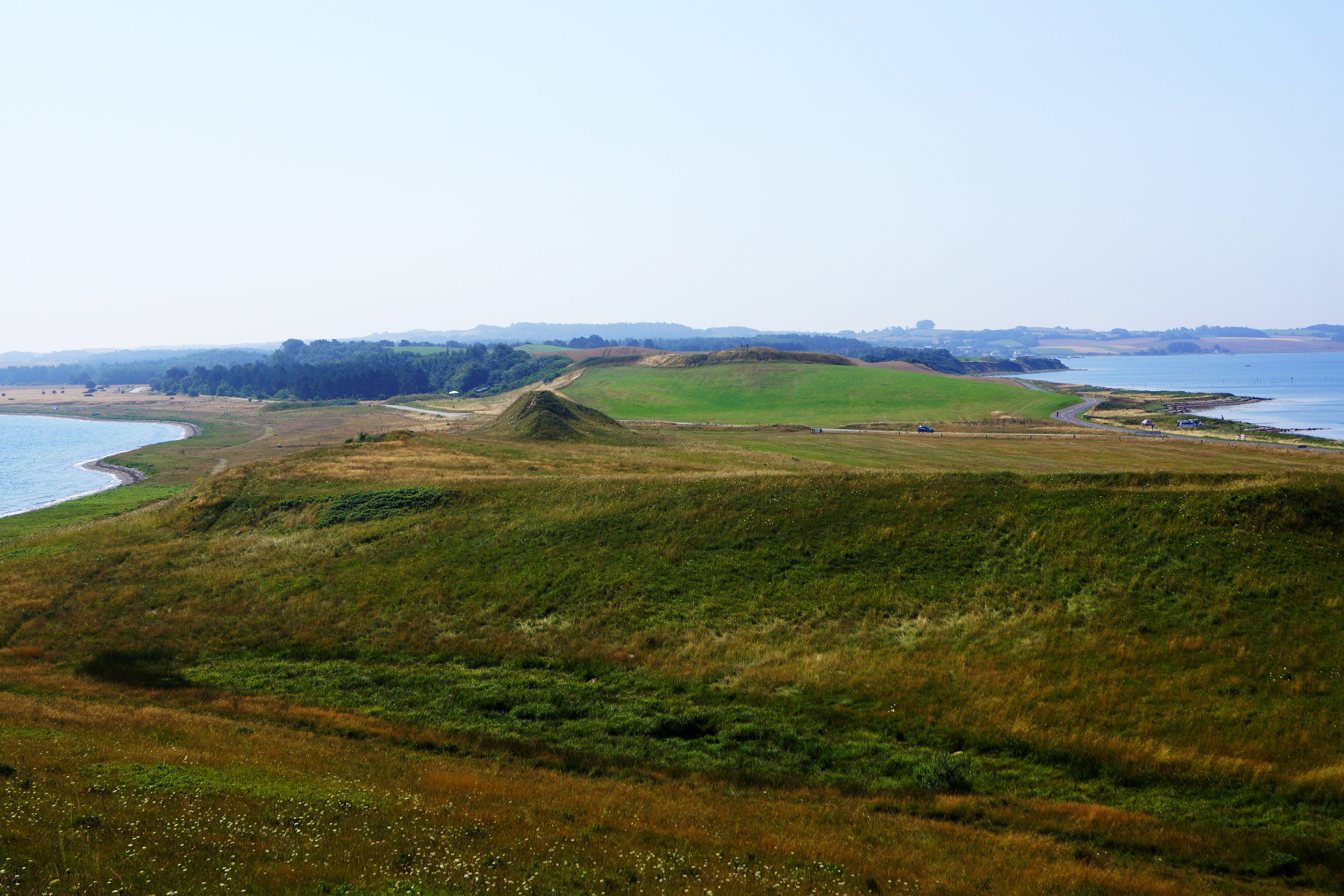
A narrow strip of land, Dragsmur, connects Helgenæs to the mainland.

Helgenæs is a peninsula, approximately twenty square kilometres in size, stretching out from Mols in Denmark. Mols is itself part of the large peninsula of Djursland, in the middle of the Kattegat sea between Denmark and Sweden.

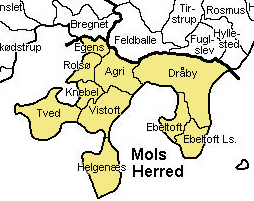
Helgenæs Peninsula forms the southern extremity of the Mols Peninsula

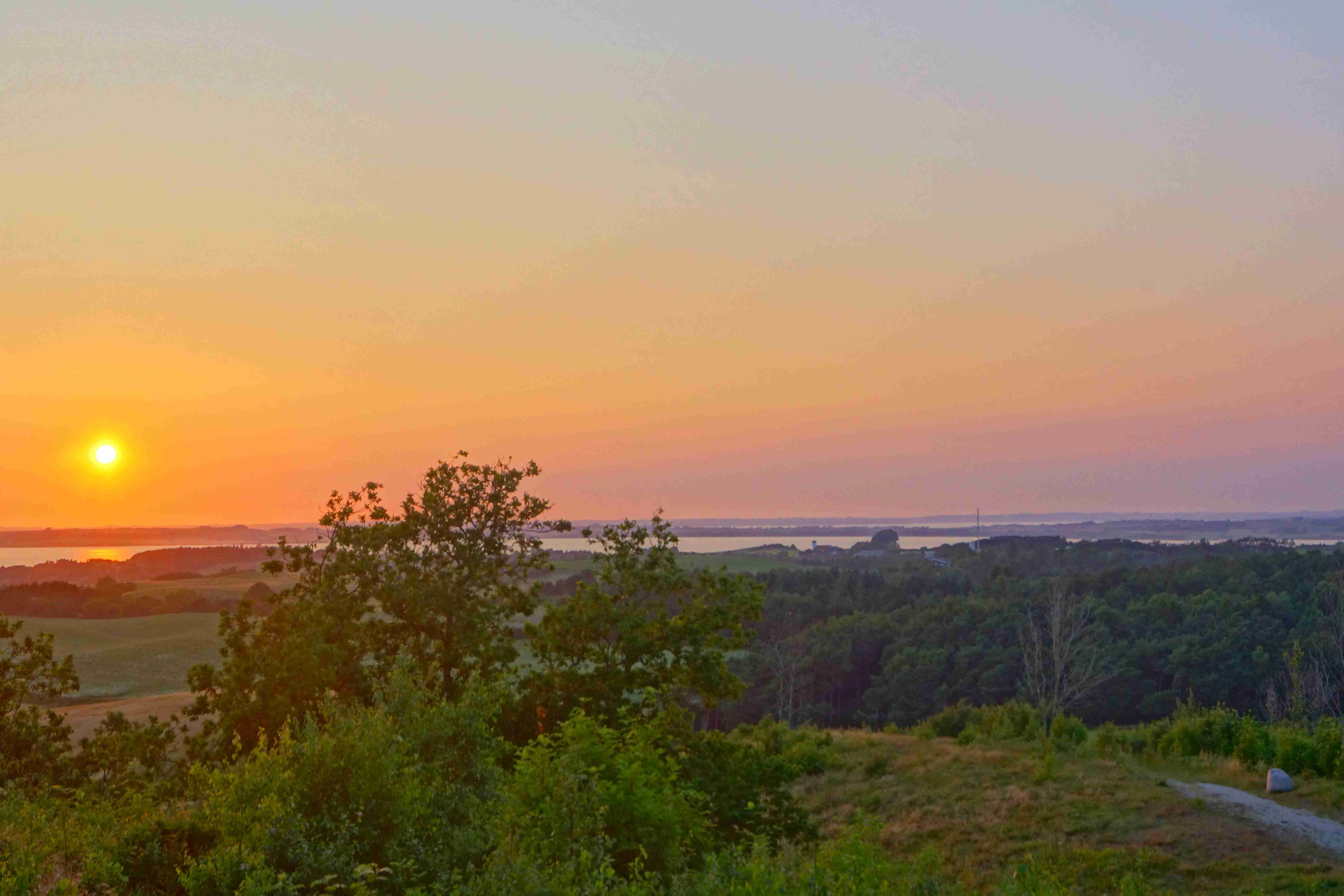
Midsummer view, north towards Begtrup Bay, from the hill, Ellemandsbjerg.

West of Helgenæs, 16 kilometres across the Bay of Aarhus, lies Aarhus, the second-largest city in Denmark. Ten kilometres to the east is the small coastal town of Ebeltoft, with a well-developed tourism industry comprising marinas and summer rentals in the surrounding countryside, including Helgenæs. Five kilometres to the northwest is Skødshoved, another minor peninsula of Mols. Villages on Helgenæs are Kongsgårde, Borup and Fejrup. Just north of Helgenæs is the large recently inaugurated Mols Bjerge National Park, comprising most of the entire Djursland region.

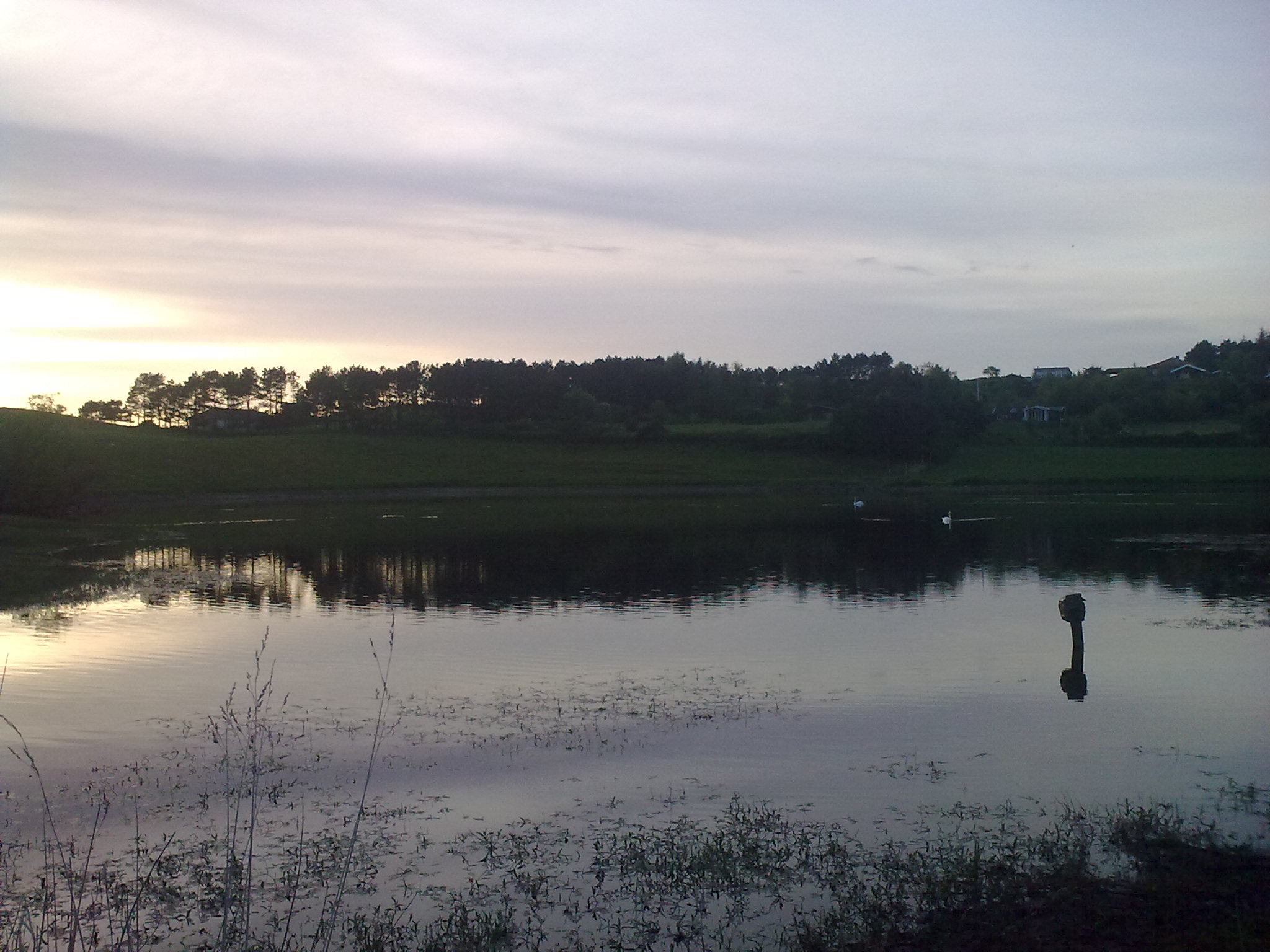
A lake on northwestern Helgenæs.

== Etymology ==
The name, Helgenæs, derives from Danish words hellig (holy) and næs (headland), and the earliest written sources from 1230, spelled it "Hælghænæs". Inhabitants of Helgenæs are known as Helboere (singular: Helbo).

== History ==
As nearly all of Denmark, Helgenæs was formed at the end of the last ice age some 12,000 years ago. The narrowest part of the peninsula, Dragsmur, is 240 meters wide. It is said that the Vikings, when sailing in and out of the Bay of Aarhus transported their longships across the narrow section, perhaps by rolling them on tree trunks. By doing this, they were able to save approximately 4 nautical miles (7 km) of travel.

The waters around Helgenæs was the site of a larger naval battle in 1043, when the exiled king Sven Estridsen attacked and battled King Magnus the Good here in order to reclaim the throne of Denmark. Sven lost, but regained the throne only a few years later, as Magnus died by other means in 1047.

The local association of "Helgenæs Præstegård" was established in 2011 in order to mediate the cultural history of Helgenæs to both locals and visitors alike. They are based in a restored former parsonage farmhouse just east of Fejrup.

== Tourism ==
Tourists from other parts of Denmark, other Scandinavian countries such as Sweden and Norway, and Germany often visit Helgenæs and represents a considerable percentage of the population in the summer. Especially the town of Fejrup and the hills of Stødovbakker have many summer rentals.

The hilly countryside with a long and accessible coastline in a mild, not to hot, summer climate is an attraction. Sletterhage Fyr, an old lighthouse in southwestern Helgenæs, and Tyskertårnet, a concrete watchtower built during the German occupation in World War II, are also visited by many guests. In the southwestern part of Helgenæs, in the town of Ørby, is a gallery with the paintings of Bo Bendixen, a noted Danish painter.

The main shopping facility on Helgenæs is the small "Dagli'Brugsen" supermarket in the village of Kongsgårde. Chiefly (though not only) in the summer, tiny stands in the roadside sell honey, fruits, potatoes, eggs or even homemade souvenirs; these are scattered all over the peninsula, although mostly in main streets going through towns. These small stands are normally unmanned, and payment works on the honor system.

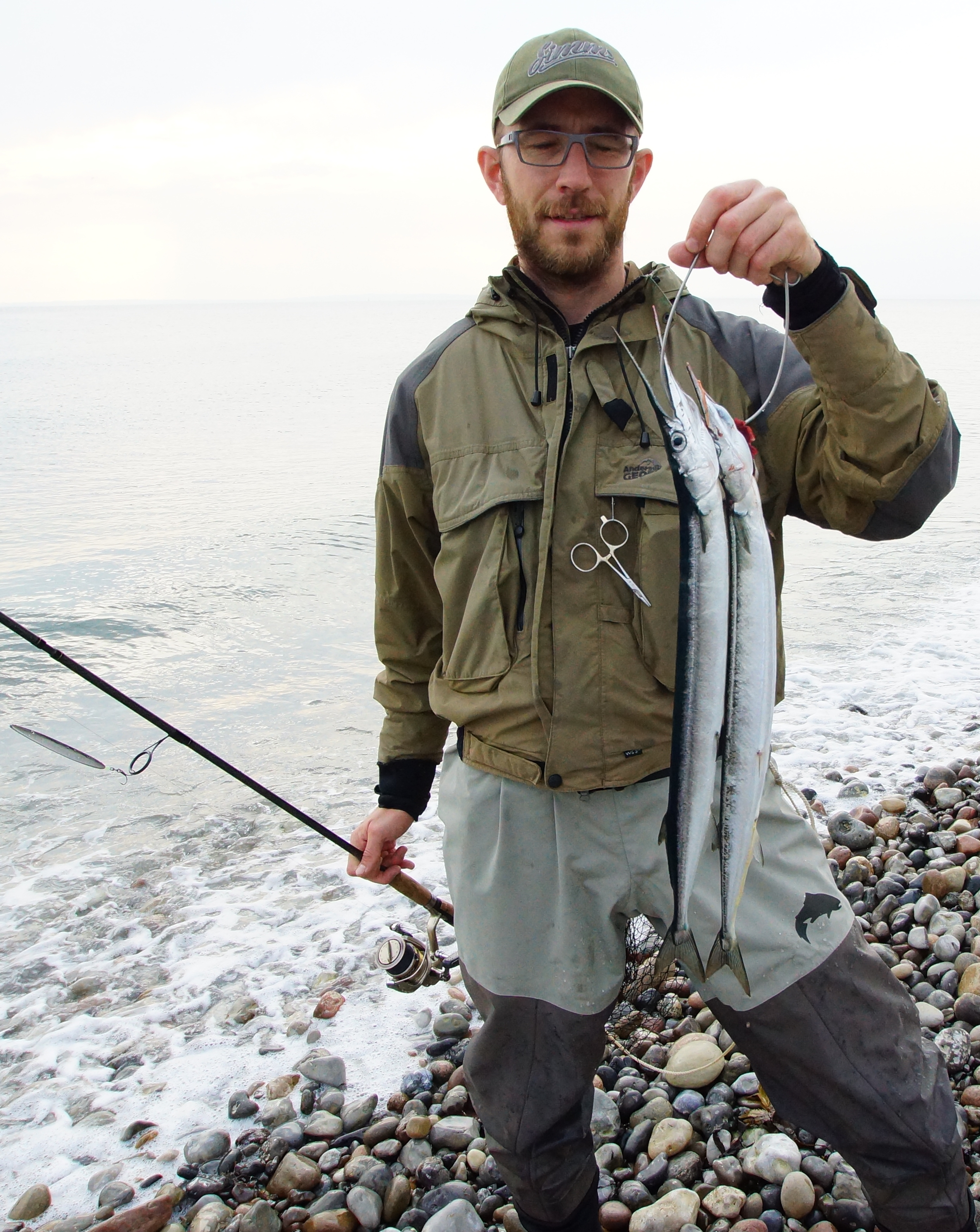
Garfish caught west of the Sletterhage Lighthouse in September.

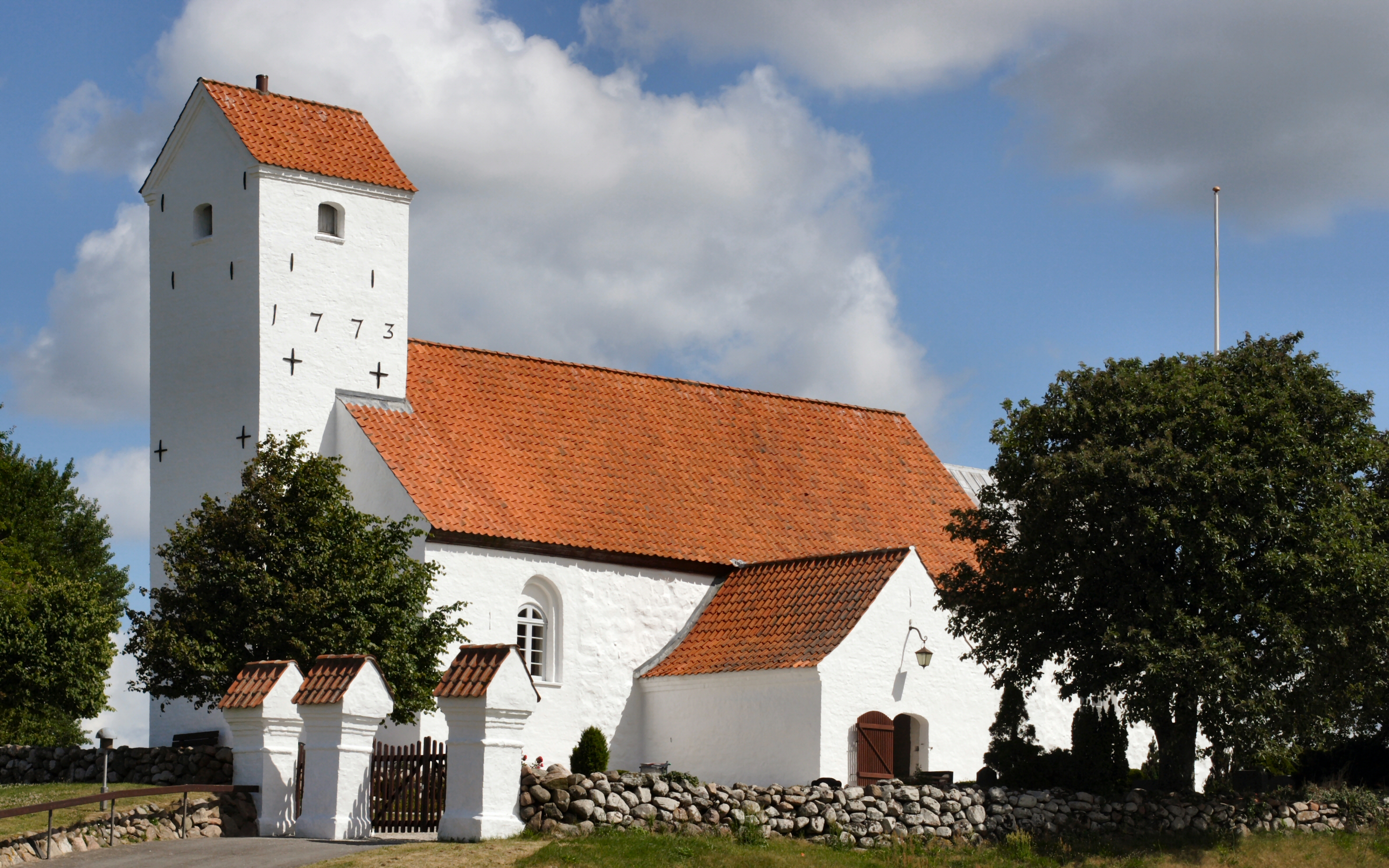
Stødov Kirke.

Stødov Kirke is the only church on Helgenæs, and in a small building close to the church lies a museum of local history. In the middle of Helgenæs is also a community house, where summer and Christmas parties are held.

There is an exhibit at the Sletterhage lighthouse, with modern and old navigational instruments, and a geological exhibition, showing how the Helgenæs landscape was formed during the ice ages. On display are also characteristic stones that can be found on the beaches, that can be traced back to different prehistoric volcanoes in Norway and Sweden, brought to the area by ice sheet movements.

Helgenæs Naturefterskole; is an independent boarding school on Helgenæs, for lower secondary students with educational focus on nature and outdoor activities, including angling from the shores of Helgenæs.

== Transport ==
Bus route 361 goes between Helgenæs and Rønde once an hour in weekdays between 05:00 and 18:00, going counter-clockwise around the peninsula. This connects Helgenæs with other bus routes going to larger cities such as Århus, Grenå, Ebeltoft and Randers.
