= Kalø Vig =

Coordinates: 56°15′0″N 10°25′0″E

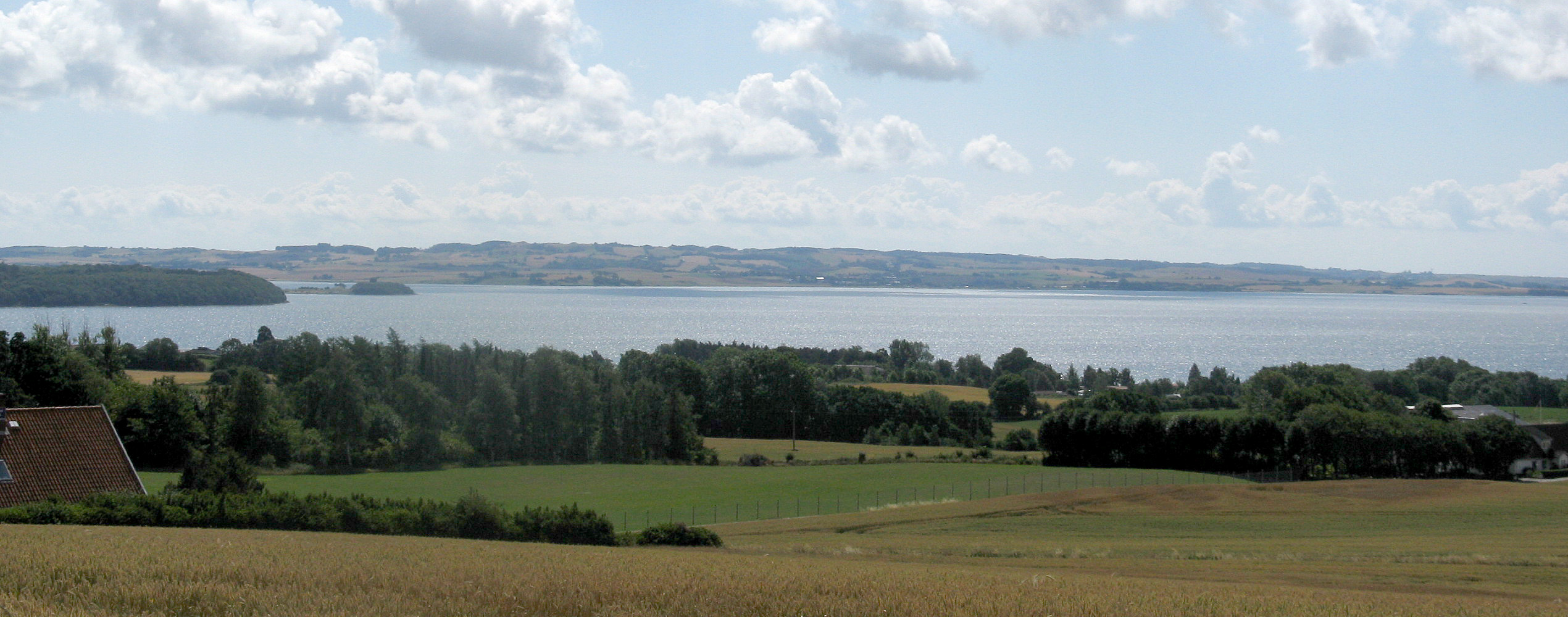
Kalø Vig seen from Ugelbølle, Kalø Castle, and Mols Bjerge National Park i the background

Kalø Vig (English: Kalø Cove) is a cove in the north end of the Bay of Aarhus, Denmark. It stretches in a semicircle from Skæring in the North West to Kalø Castle below Rønde in the North to the peninsula Skødshoved in the East. The area around Kalø Castle became a nature preserve in 1939 and is now a part of Mols Bjerge National Park. Sight lines over the cove from Hjelmager south of Løgten are subject to conservation and preservation rules.

Kalø Vig is characterized by the contrast between the modern Studstrupværket on the West side of the cove and the ruined medieval castle Kalø Slot at the bottom of the cove.

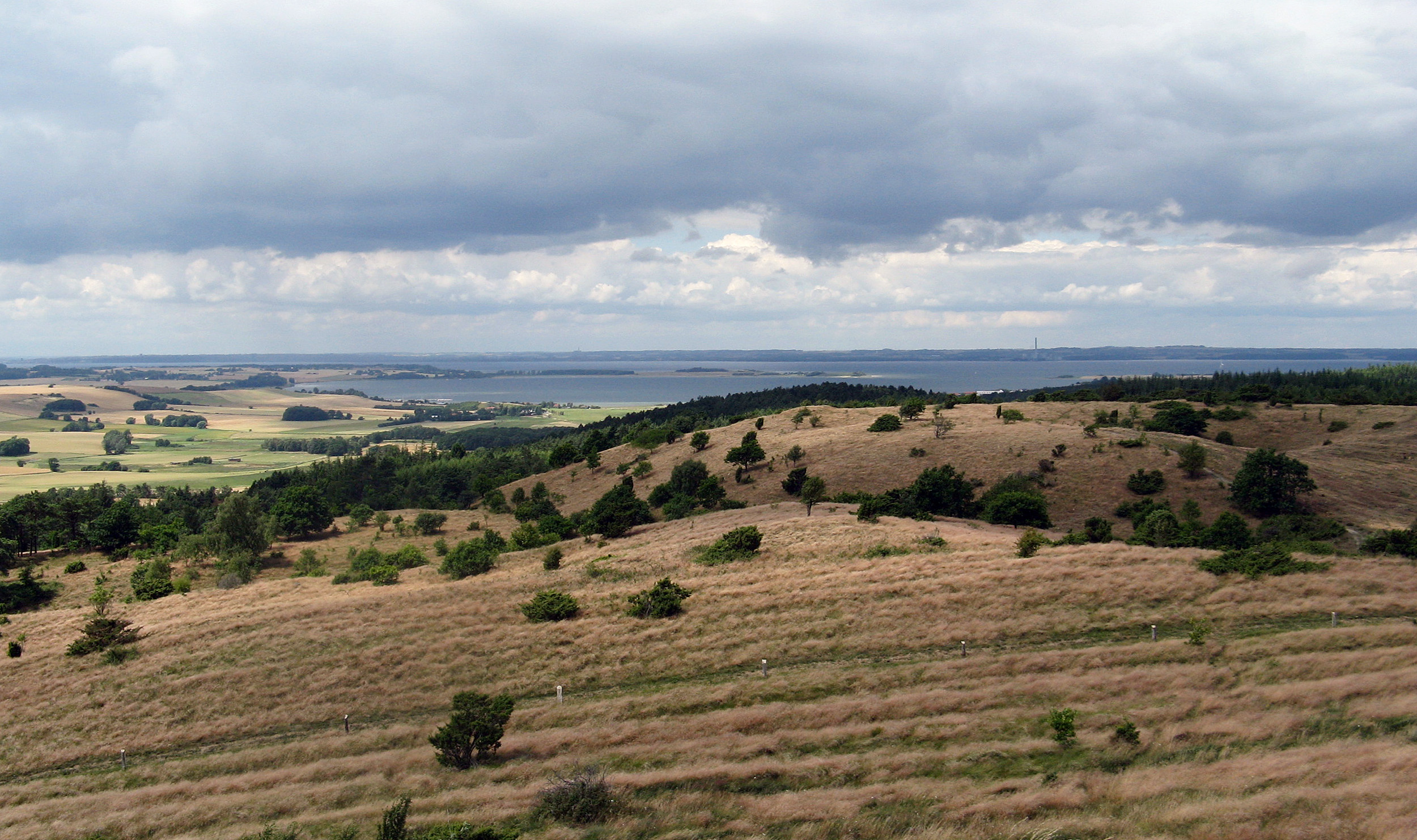
Kalø Vig seen from Mols Bjerge; In the baggrunden Studstrupværket.

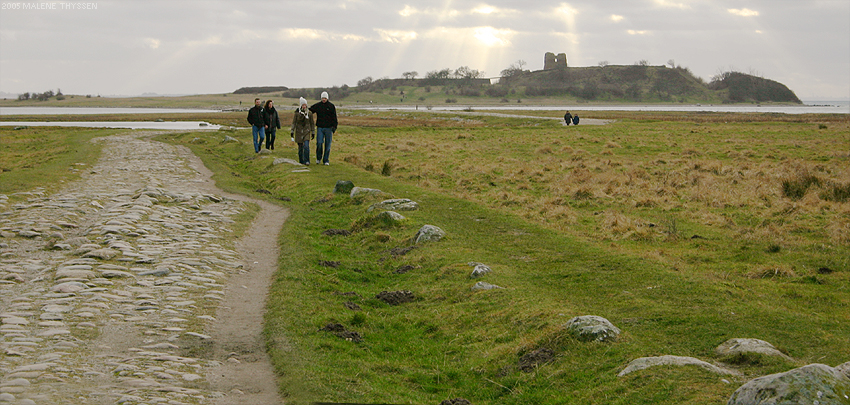
Kalø Castle and the 500 m. cobbled dam to the island.
