= Rønde =

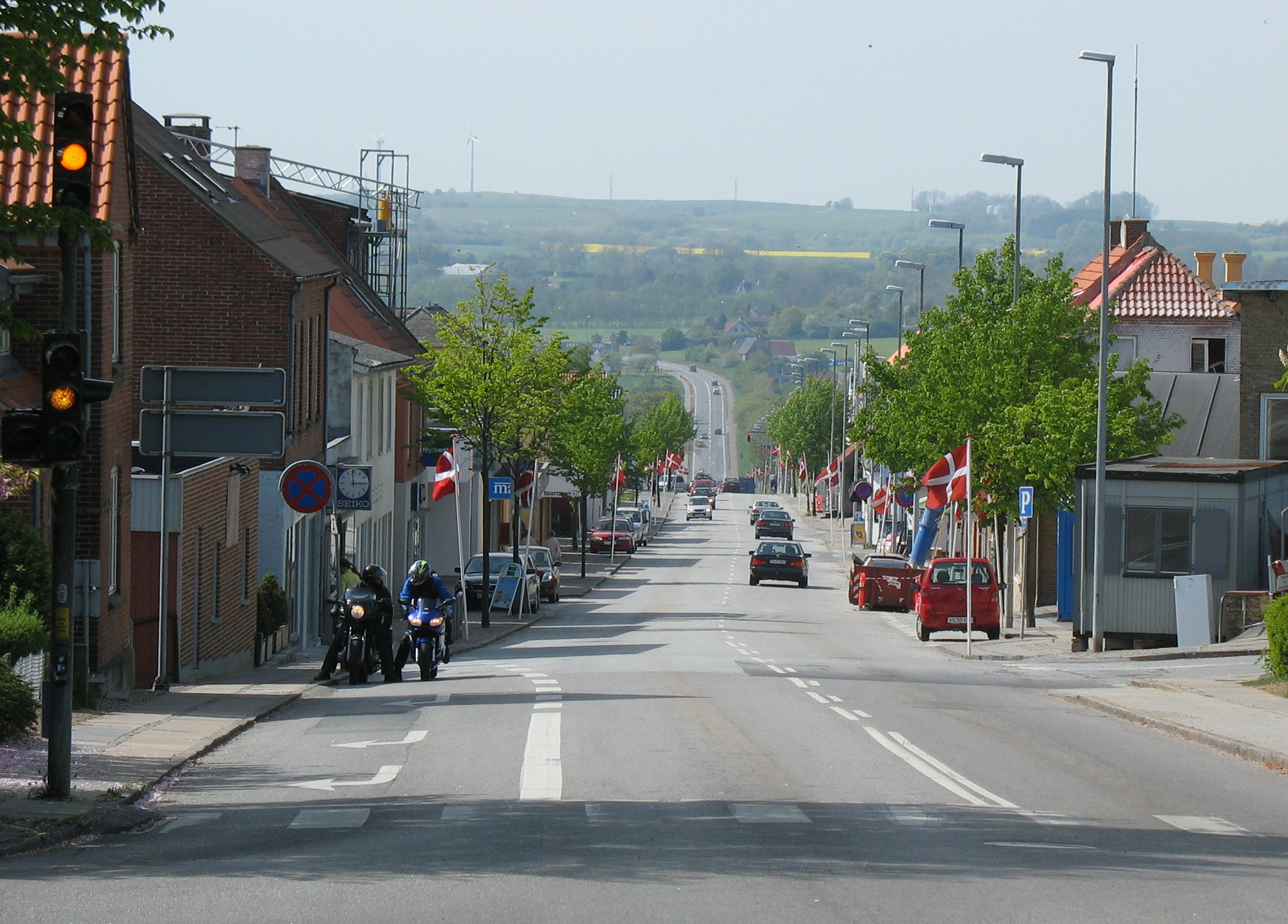
- Looking down Rønde's main street

- Location within Denmark Location within Central Denmark Region
- Coordinates: 56°18′02″N 10°28′40″E
- Country: Denmark
- Region: Mid Jutland (Midjylland)
- Municipality: Syddjurs

Area
  - Urban: 2.3 km^{2} (0.89 sq mi)
- Elevation: 5–100 m (16–328 ft)

Population (2026)
  - Urban: 3,329
  - Urban density: 1,400/km^{2} (3,700/sq mi)
- Time zone: UTC+1 (CET)
  - Summer (DST): UTC+1 (CEST)
- Postal code: 8410
- Area code: (+45) 86

Rønde (or Roende) is a town on the southern part of the peninsula, Djursland in Denmark, Northern Europe, 23 kilometers north-east of the north end of Denmark's second largest city, Aarhus. It is in part a commuter town to Aarhus, with a motorway entering Aarhus from the north. Rønde is located between Aarhus, and Aarhus Airport with a 12 kilometer drive from Rønde to the airport.

Rønde is placed in hilly country overlooking Aarhus Bay with 2.5 kilometers to the bay and the marina, Nappedam. The closest sandy beach for swimming lies in Følle Strand, 3.4 kilometers from Rønde.

Rønde has a population of 3,329 as of 1. January 2026.

Rønde lies in Syddjurs Municipality. The administrative headquarters of Syddjurs Municipality is in Ebeltoft.

== Geography ==
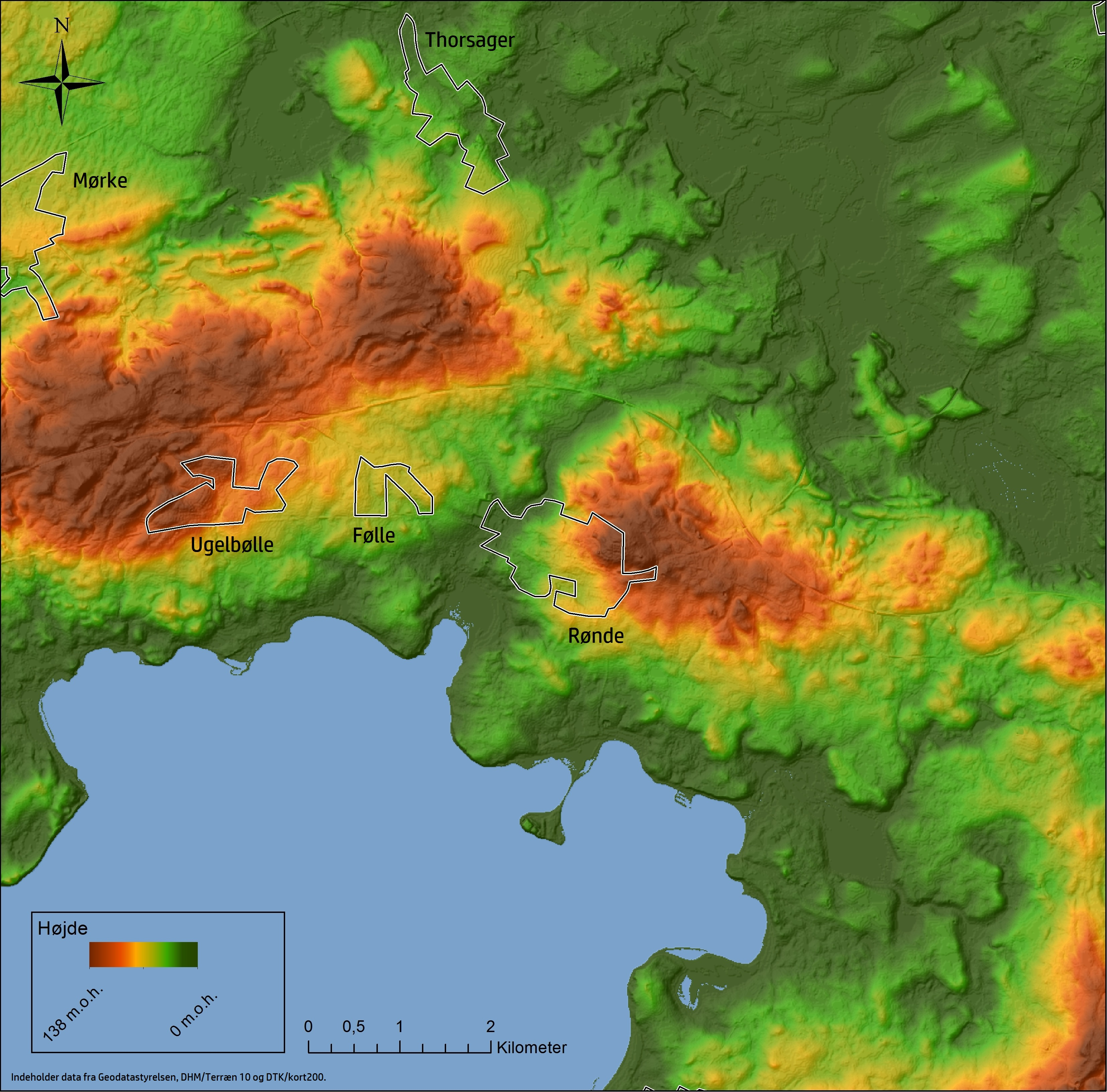
Elevation map with town limits for the Rønde area. To the west the town is located in a glacial valley, and to the east it stretches up a moraine hill.

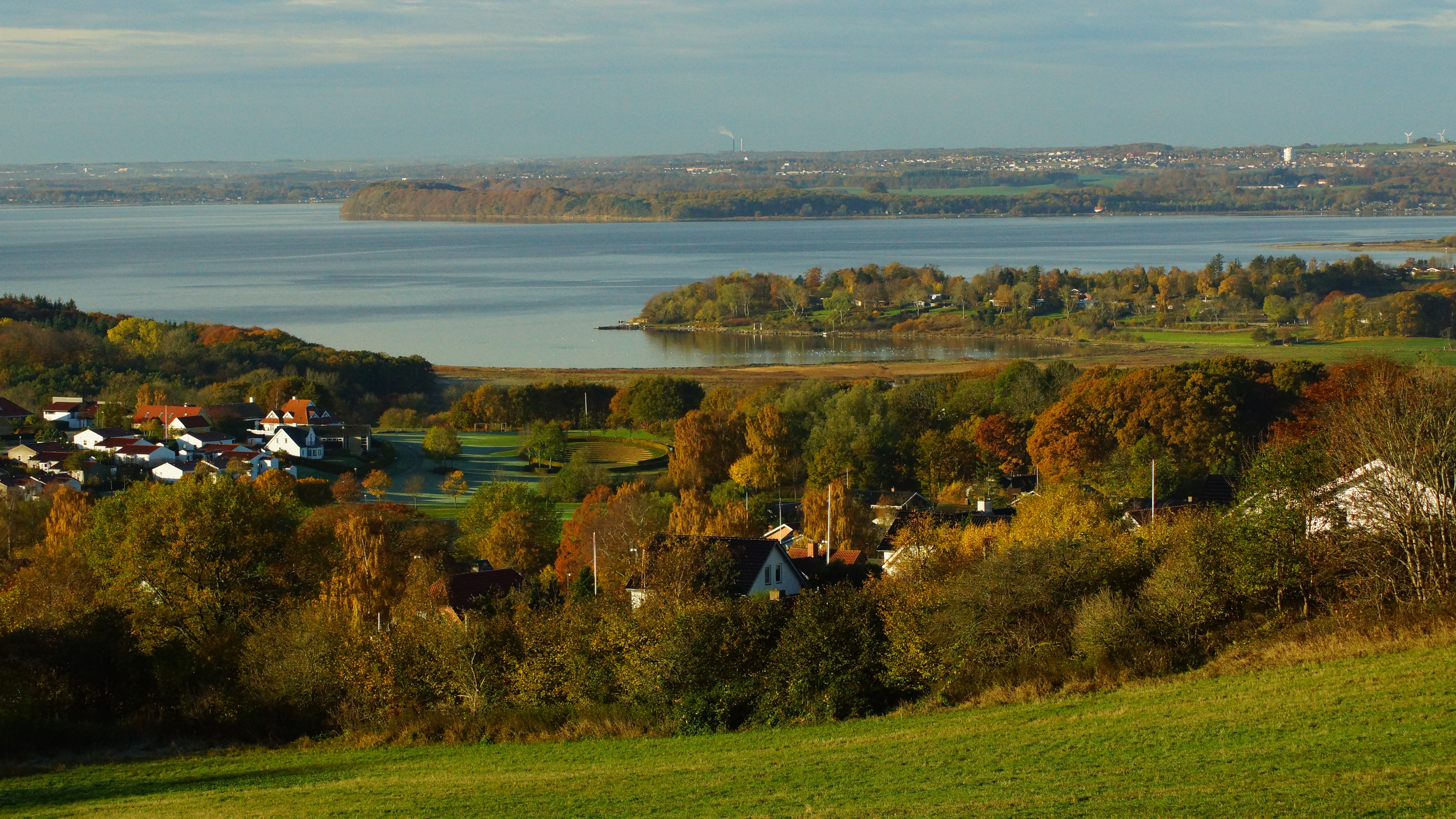
View from hill top by Rønde over parts of the town with Følle Bay, Århus Bay and Jutland in the background

Rønde is a hill town, with a 95-meter difference in elevation between the lowest and highest part. This kind of grade difference is unusual for Denmark, where the overall highest point in the country is 172 meters above sea level.

Rønde has a temperate coastal climate with an average summer temperature in July of 20 degrees Celsius in the day, and 12 degrees at night, and an average winter temperature in January with 5 degrees in the day and 1 degree at night (1961–1990) The average precipitation is 722 millimeters per year, making relatively flat Denmark well suited for farming. Barley, wheat, canola, and in recent years corn, are common crops in the farmland surrounding Rønde as well as in the rest of Denmark.

== Education ==
There is a public and a private primary school in Rønde, as well as Syddjurs Gymnasium, a high school with boarding. Rønde also has a vocational school with a number of lines related to crafts, commerce and computer oriented specialisations.

Rønde also has a Folk High School and an Efterskole. These are types of boarding schools that young people in Denmark can choose, typically for a year, to cultivate special interests such as sports and aspects of culture, such as theatre, or as a means of strengthening their academic skill, often as a break before continuing in the mainstream education system.

A neighboring smaller town, Ugelbølle, has a recently established private primary school, Ugelbølle Friskole. Ugelbølle also has an industrial area, and a newer residential neighborhood dominated by over the average priced housing. All of the houses have a view over Aarhus Bay. Ugelbølle lies 1.5 kilometres from the western outskirts of Rønde. The two towns are likely to merge in the coming years.

Another private primary school close to Rønde is Syddjurs Friskole 5.8 kilometres from Rønde.

Aarhus University has a bioscience department at the Kalø Estate just east of Rønde.

== Commerce ==
The main road through Rønde is also a route from the city of Aarhus to residential and summer house areas on the southern part of the Djursland peninsula. Rønde is also a local shopping centre. There are a number of shops, supermarkets, trades, crafts and restaurants in the town.

== Surroundings ==
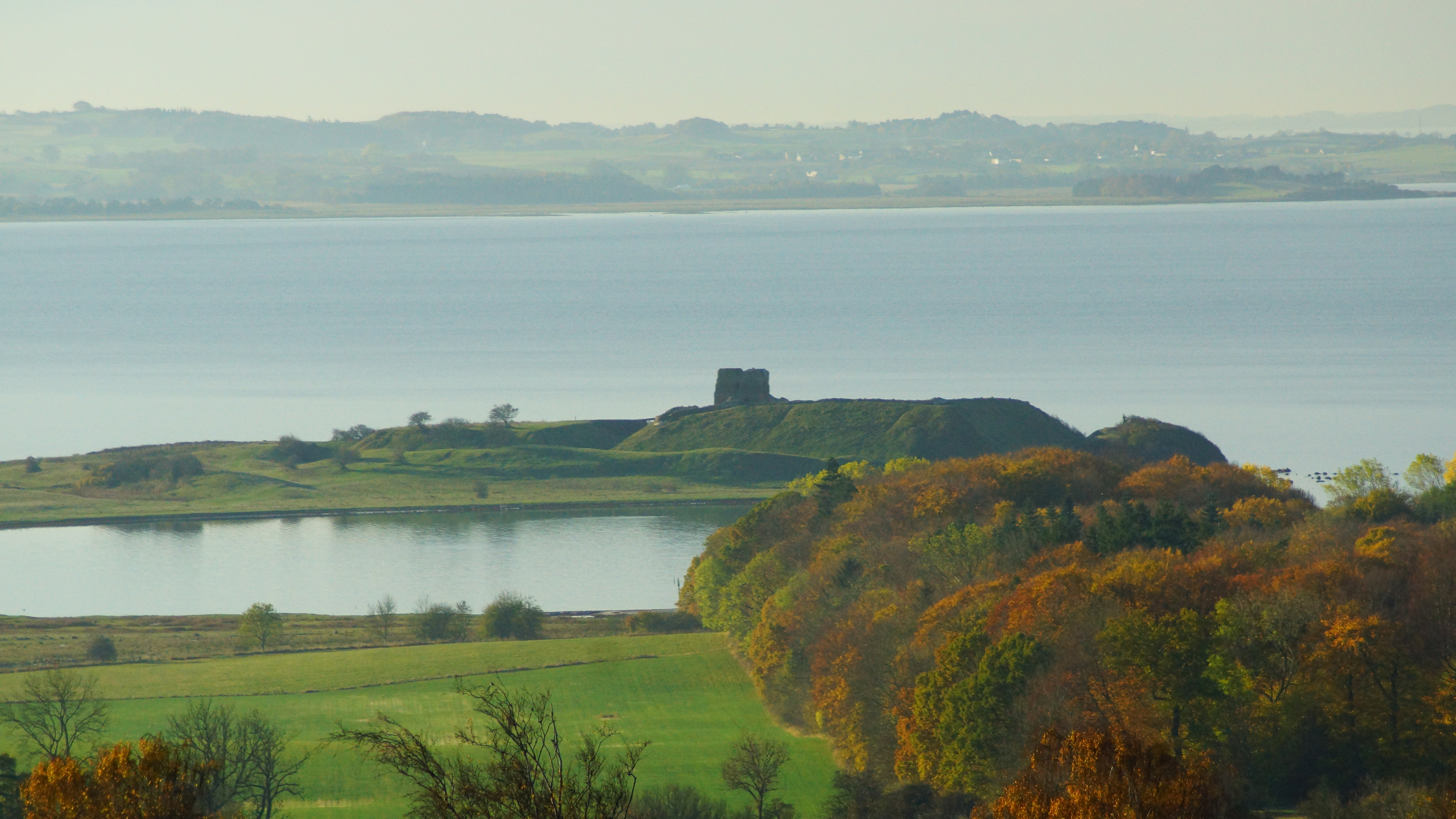
Peninsula with Kalø Castle Ruin and part of Hestehave Skov. The photo was taken from a hilltop burial mound in the eastern outskirts of Rønde.

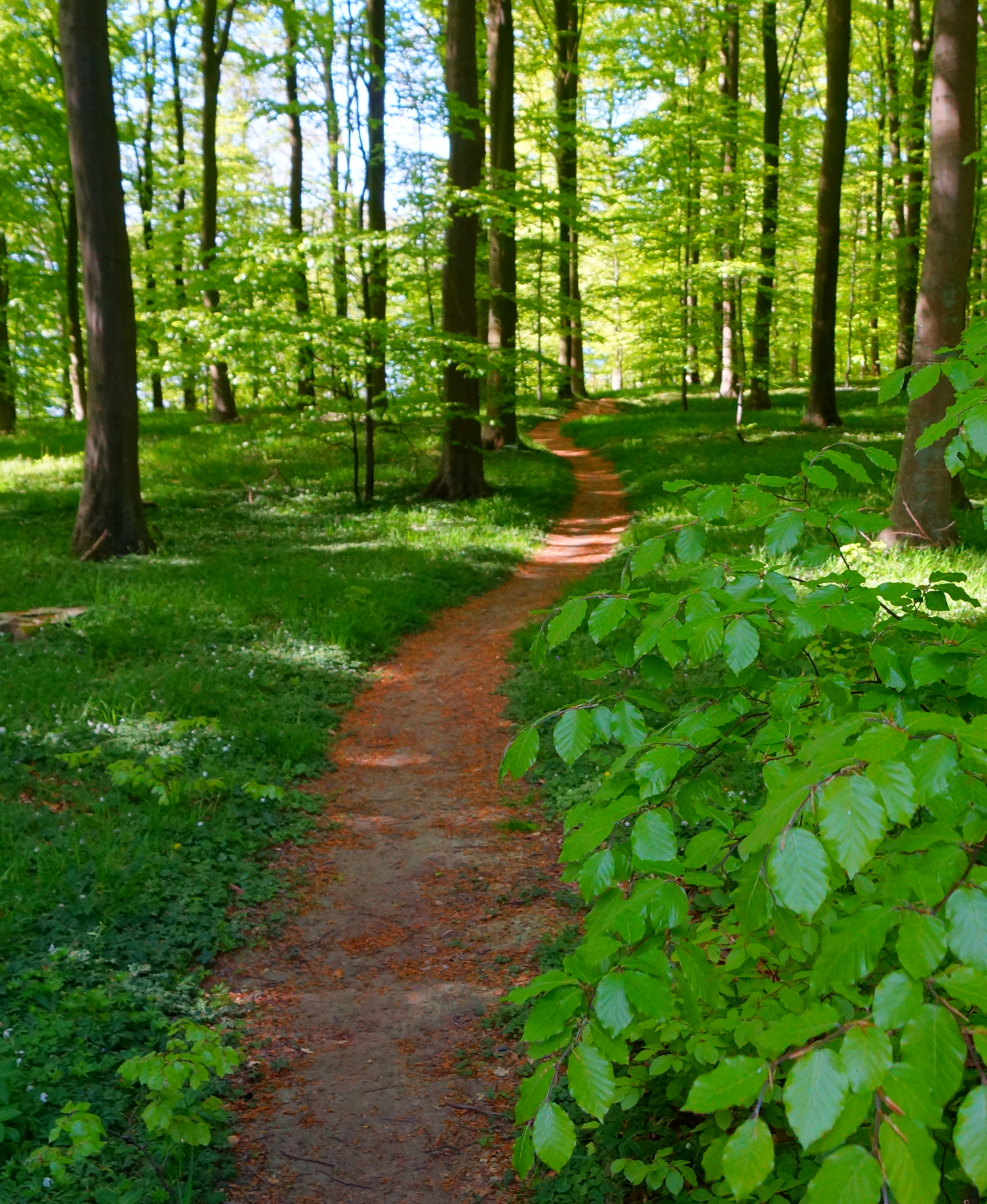
Path through beech wood in spring at Hestehave Skov by Rønde.

At the southern outskirts of Rønde the recreational wood, Hestehave Wood, extends downhill to the sea at Aarhus Bay. The wood is state owned and has a network of footpaths and gravel roads used by the inhabitants of Rønde and others. Next to Hestehave Wood lies the Kalø Castle Ruin 2.5 kilometres from Rønde, placed on an island with a cobbled medieval road on a dam leading to the ruin. The place is a tourist attraction.

Rønde lies next to the coastal Mols Bjerge National Park, covering a hilly area by the sea with many bays and coves. One of the two main roads to the tourism based coastal town, Ebeltoft in the park, passes through Rønde. Ebeltoft is 20 kilometers from Rønde to the south-east located on the southern part of the Djursland peninsula.

A road from Aarhus to another coastal town, Grenå, passes through Rønde, with 33 kilometres to Grenå. Grenå is a coastal town with part of the economy based on tourism, for a large part due to a sandy beach facing the Kattegat sea between Denmark and Sweden. Grenå is also a seaport with a ferry connection to Varberg in Sweden, as well as being a town based on industry and education.

There are many summer rentals and summer houses on the coastlines of the Djursland peninsula, including at the village, Følle Strand, 3.4 kilometres from Rønde.

== Transport ==
From Rønde one can travel to the island of Zealand and Copenhagen, via car and ferry sailing either from Ebeltoft or Aarhus, reaching the capital in approximately two and a half hours. It is also possible to drive all the way via bridges over the island of Fyn, to Zealand. This is a three and a half hour drive.

Public transportation in Denmark is often comprehensive. Rønde has a recently built a bus terminal. The town is a bus-hub for southern Djursland, including regular connections to Aarhus.

== Notable people ==
- Lene Demsitz (born 1959), long jumper
- William Kvist (born 1985), footballer
