= Hestehave Wood =

Forest in Mols Bjerge National Park, Denmark

Horse Garden (Hestehave) Danish Wood
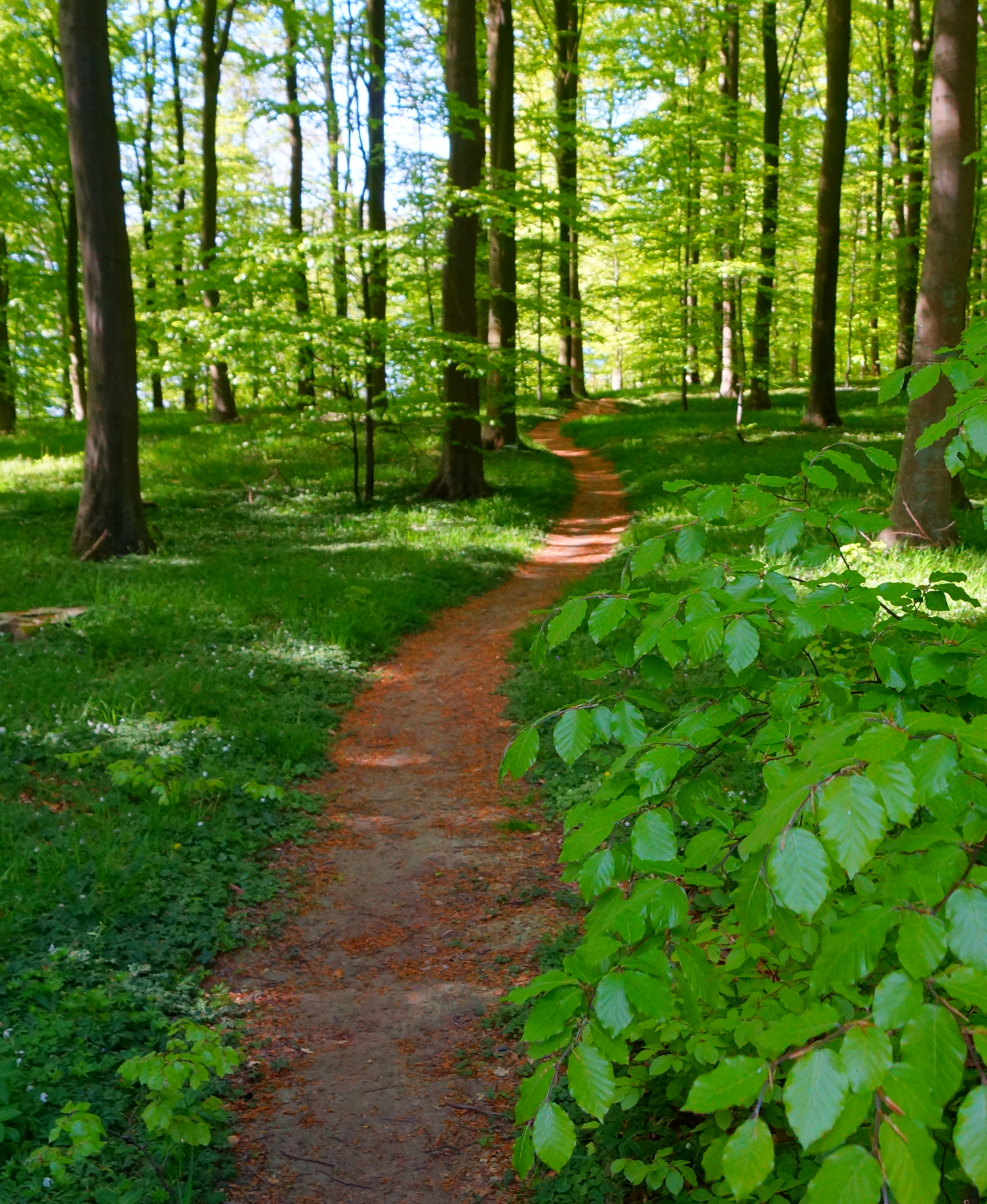
- Hestehave is located in National Park Mols Bjerge.

- Location within Denmark
- Location: Syddjurs Municipality
- Nearest city: Rønde
- Coordinates: 56°16′59.9″N 10°28′48.3″E
- Area: 1.5 km^{2} (0.58 sq mi)

Hestehave Wood (Horse Garden Wood) on southern Djursland in Denmark, Northern Europe, at the entrance to The Baltic Sea between Denmark and Sweden, is a recreational wood with a temperate coastal climate, owned by the Danish state. Hestehave is located close to the town Rønde, 21 miles north of the second largest city in Denmark, Aarhus.

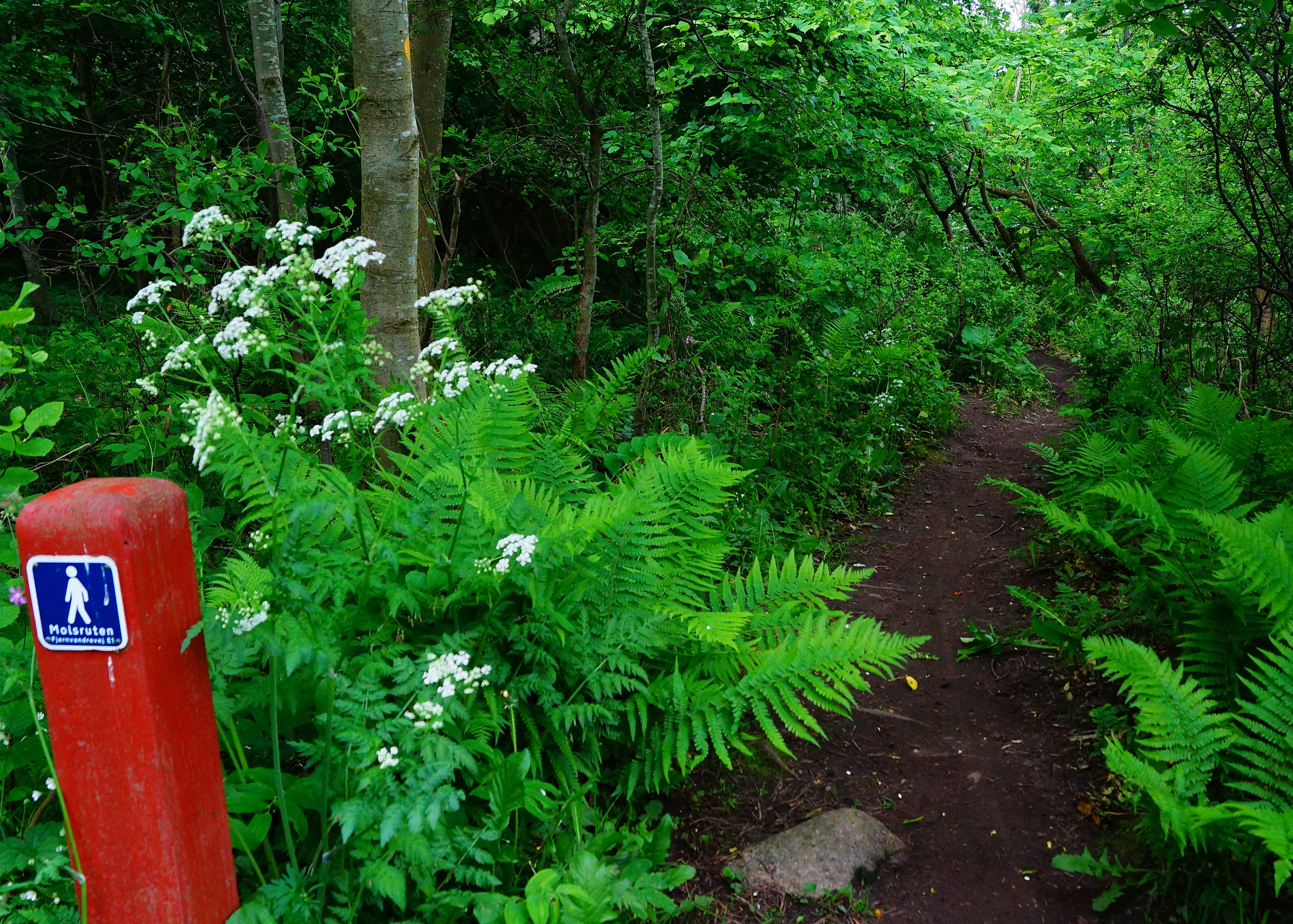
Hiking Trail no. 91 is part of the international North Sea Trail, passing through Hestehave Wood.

Hestehave Wood is part of Mols Bjerge National Park, with a southern and eastern coastline bordering the ruined Kalø Castle and the Slotsvig- and Følle Bugt- coves at the southern and eastern perimeter.

Historically the wood has been part of the Kalø Estate, where the Danish Environmental Research Institute has its headquarters today. The researchers here often use Hestehave Wood for studies, such as of the 300 roe deer in the area.

== Troll Forrest ==
The oldest parts of Hestehave Wood dates back to the mid-seventeenth century. In the Sea Hills/Havbakkerne by Følle Bay and the Slotsvig cove, one finds an up to 200 year old so-called troll forest of crippled beech trees. The peculiar growth is caused by the trunks growing out from the same stub close to each other, combined with wind and salt exposure from the sea, crippling the trees to a crooked form, as if trolls had been at play.

== The Hole Tree/Hultræet ==
Hestehave Wood has a Gallows Hill, where the Hole Tree is. It consists of a combination of two trunks that have merged, leaving a hole in the middle. The hole is getting smaller as the trunks grow. Just as with other hollow trees in the folklore, the belief is that passing through the hole can cure diseases. Children still crawl through the tree for fun.

West of the Hole Tree in Hestehaves twin wood, Ringelmose, is a holy spring by the forest track from Bregnet Church, leading into the wood. Today the spring has the form of a small circular dam. In earlier times it was a centre of pilgrimage, with a reputation of curing blindness. 80 mounds and other historical sites are registered in the Caloe Woods.

== Baron Vilhelms Beech ==
From the northern parking lot one enters the wood close to the oldest tree, Baron Vilhelms Beech, approximately 170 years old. It is 36 meters tall and has a circumference of 4.7 meters, with a calculated weight of 32 tons.

Many of the trees in the wood have names, given in the first part of the 1900s by the former German owner, Baron von Jenisch, who as part of the German army was killed in the Mediterranean in 1943 during WW2. After the war, the Kalø Estate with the Kalø Woods, Hestehave and Ringelmose, were confiscated by the Danish State, which is still the owner.

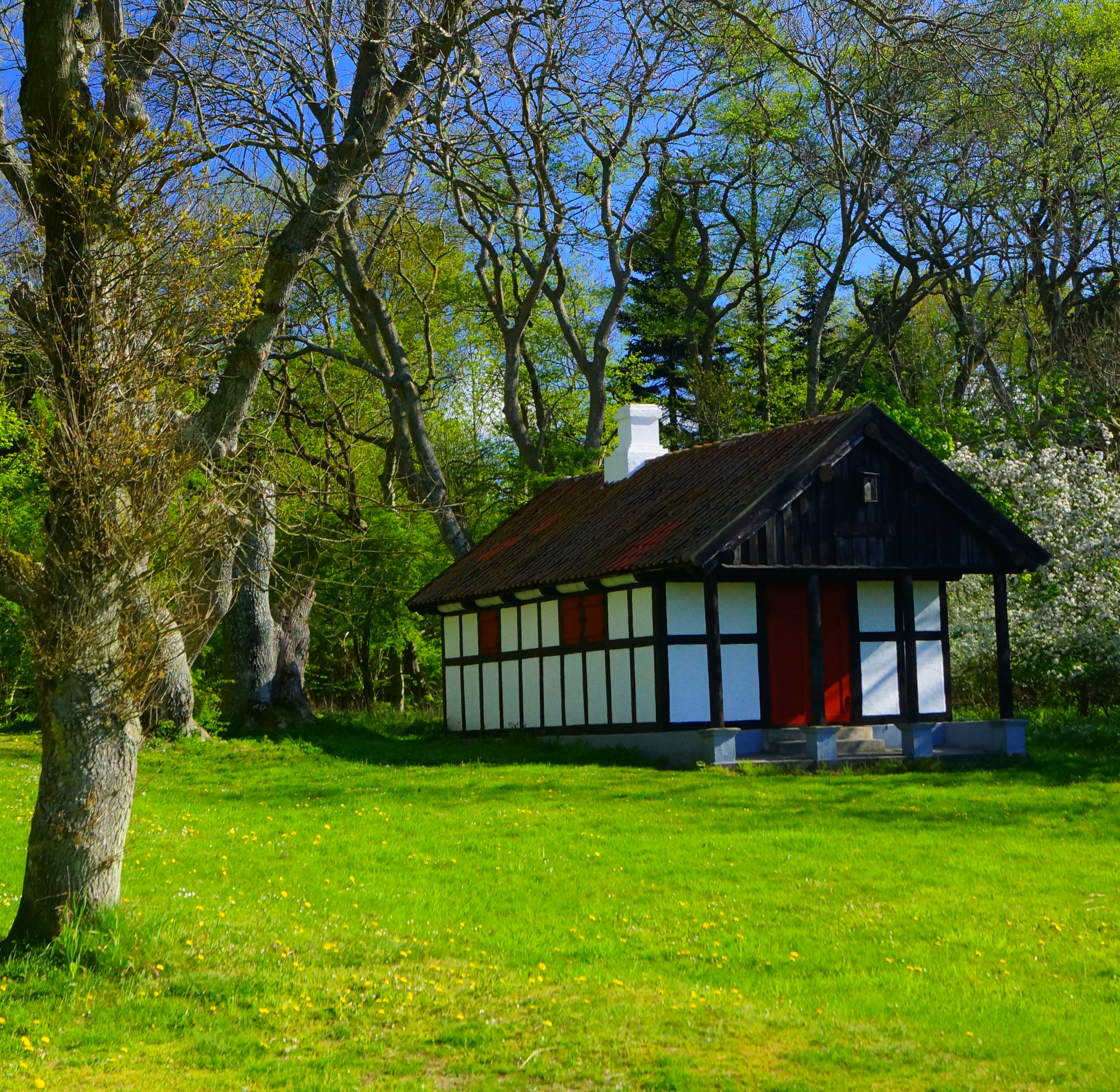
Thyras Hytte/Hut in the southern part of Hestehave Wood, can be borrowed by institutions such as kindergartens for outings.

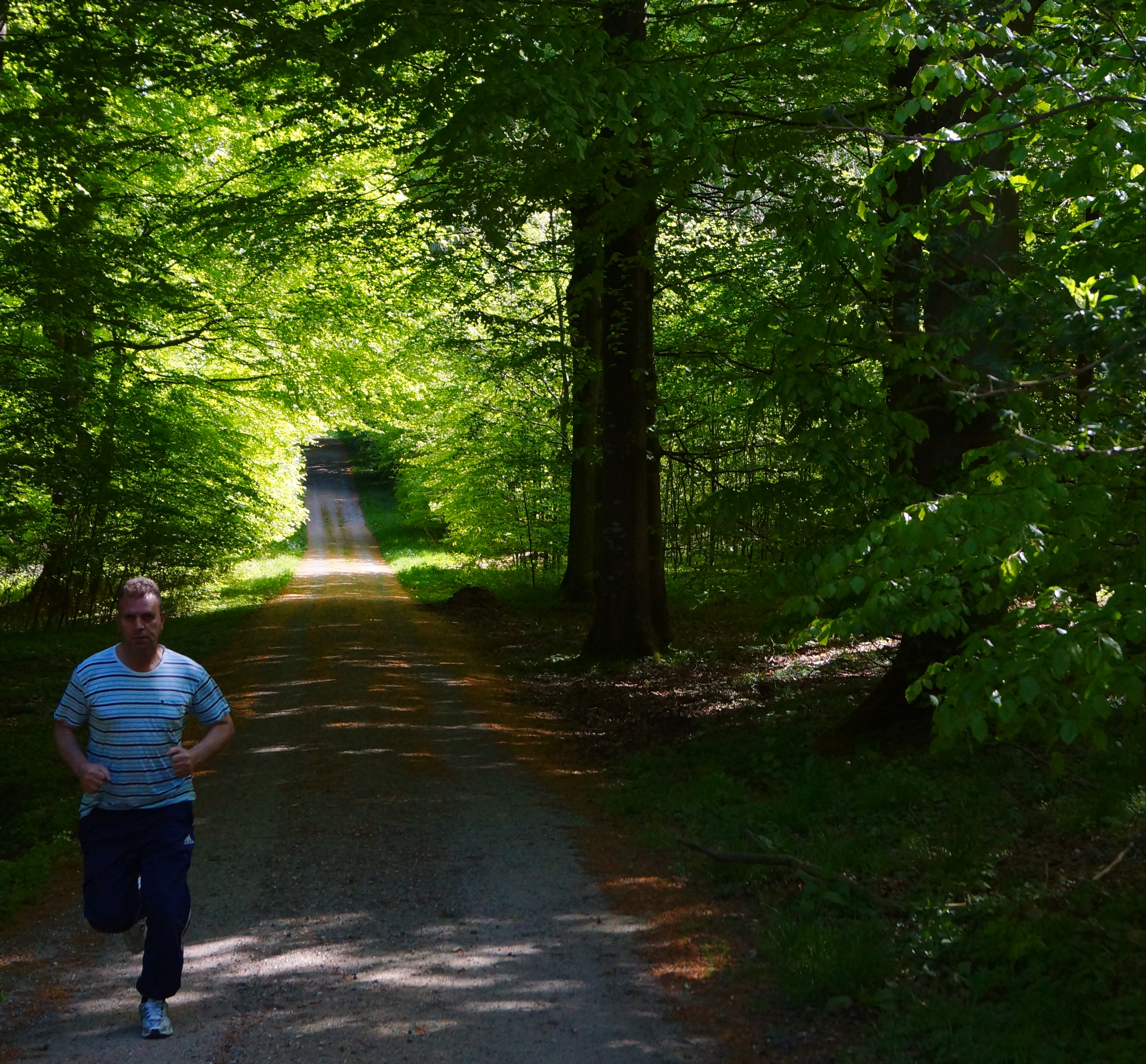
Joggers use the wood, which is connected to the town Rønde via paths.

== Thyras Hut ==
At the coast in the southern part of the wood is a cabin with a bonfire site, that institutions and others can borrow for outings. From Thyras Hut there is a view across the cove, Slotsvig, to the castle ruin.

The hut is located half a mile from the parking lot at the Castle Ruin and the Castle Inn (Slotskroen), which in a few years (as of 2014) is planned to be replaced by a new main building for Mols Bjerge National Park with exhibits and a diner.

== Twin Woods ==
The Hestehave twin wood, Ringelmose, is located half a mile west of Hestehave, and is of the same seize growing in the same hilly and clay-rich type of soil. Ongoing research that started in the eighties studies the parallel development of animal- and plant life in the two twin woods.

Hestehave Wood is maintained as an untouched forest type, where toppled trees are left on the forest floor, and new tree growth is left to emerge by itself, as opposed to Ringelmose Wood, which is run traditionally with an emphasis on production of timber. It mostly contains maple, ash, beech and a small amount of oak.

80 - 90 pct. af Hestehave is deciduous wood, with a lot of beech, predominantly old trees. This contributes to an open type of forest, with views. The two woods are part of a coastal recreational area in National Park Mols Bjerge, with many footpaths and posters with the purpose of facilitating access and information to the public.

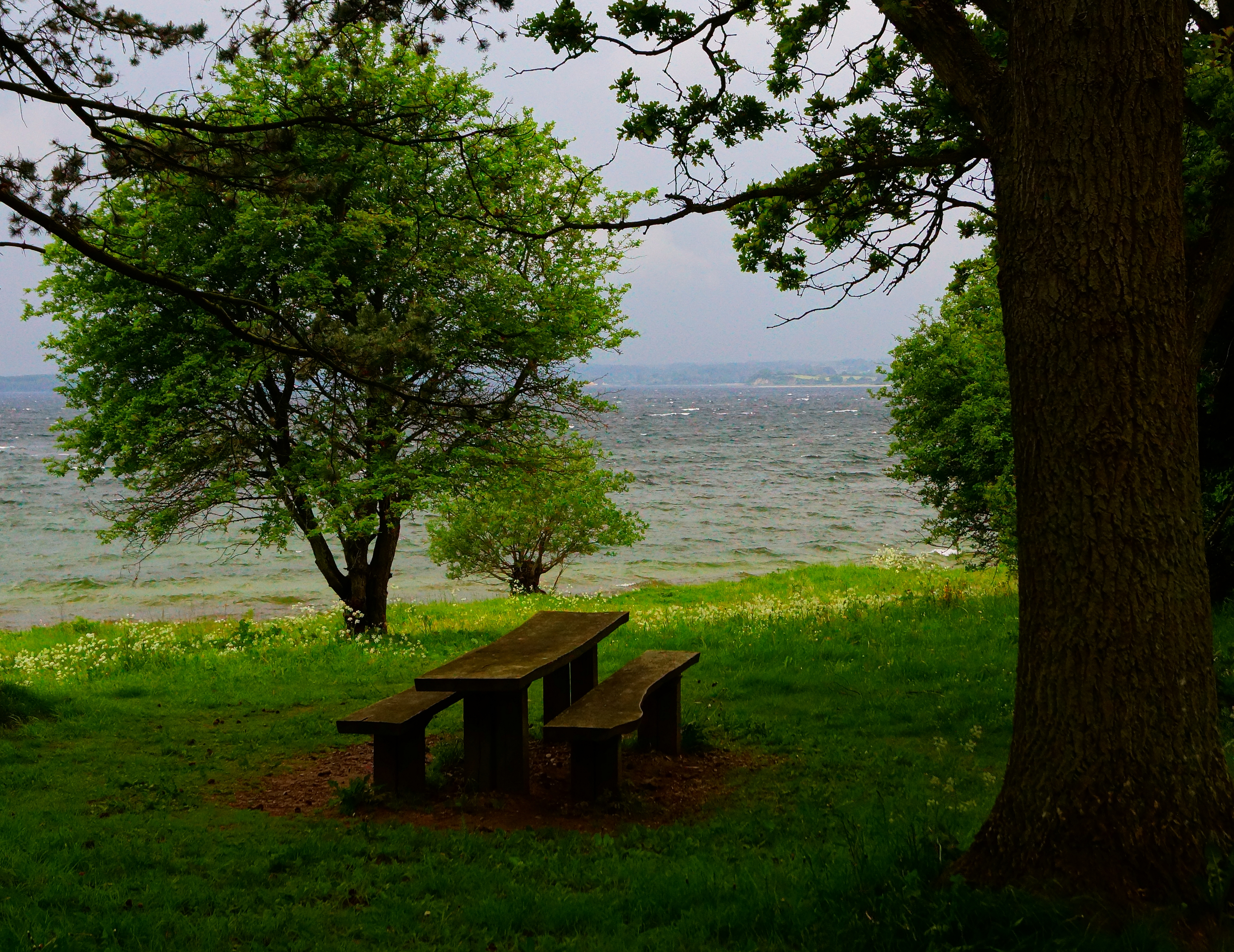
Bay of Følle, at the far end of Bay of Aarhus, seen from The Fire Wood Place (Favntræspladsen) constitutes the western border of the wood.

== Campsite ==
On the coastal plains to the south is a primitive campsite, which anyone may use after booking.

To the west, at Favntræpladsen, the Fire Wood Place, on the beach of Følle Bay, there is a picnic site with a stationary plank table and bench. Until lorries became the norm for transport, the Fire Wood Place was used to ship out firewood to Aarhus, a short 15 mile sail to the south.

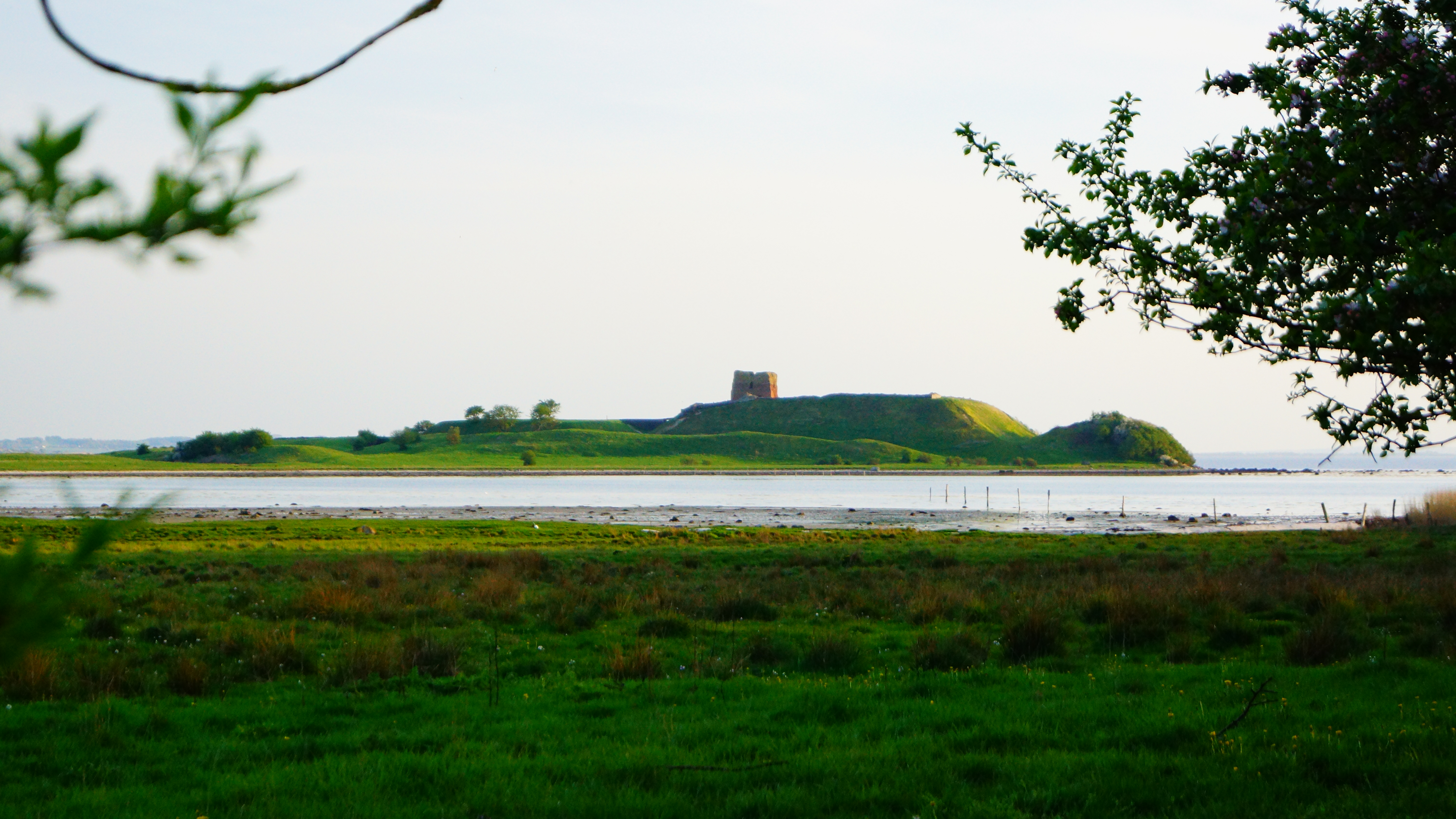
With a view of the Kaloe Castle Ruin, there is a primitive campsite on the beach plain at the southern end of the wood.

== Trails ==
Hiking Trail nr. 94 passes through Hestehave Wood. It is part of The North Sea Trail, a hiking and mountain bike trail, through seven countries around The North Sea. The trail is connected to another trail crossing Europe from Sweden to Southern Europe.

Hestehave Wood is often used for walks and jogging, not least from the town at the northern end of the wood, Rønde. The annual Egegårds-jog, from Rønde, goes through Hestehave Wood.

== Accessibility ==
Paths from Rønde lead into the wood. The parking lot for Kalø Castle Ruin is also an access point. The same parking lot is used by the non-commercial volunteer-based Kalø Vintage Car Rally, or the Tuesday Rallies, held at Kaloe each Tuesday throughout spring, summer and fall, where old car enthusiasts and on-lookers gather. Together with the Kaloe Castle Ruin the Veteran-Rallies are two main attractions in the area.

There is also access to the wood's northern part via a parking lot in from the road, Molsvej, that connects Denmark's main peninsula, Jutland, to the southern part of the peninsula, Djursland leading to the Mols Hills and the coastal town Ebeltoft.
