= List of power stations in Denmark =

This is a list of fuel-burn power stations in Denmark; fuel types are fossil or biomass.

== Thermal ==
Station	Place	Coordinates	Capacity (MW)	Fuel	Year of inauguration	Operator
Fyn Power Station	Odense	55°25′47.3″N 10°24′39.6″E	632	Natural gas, biomass, municipal waste	1953	Fjernvarme Fyn A/S
Asnæs Power Station	Kalundborg	55°39′40.7″N 11°04′44.2″E	26	Biomass	1959	Ørsted
Studstrup Power Station	Studstrup	56°15′0.7″N 10°20′41.4″E	362	Biomass	1968	Ørsted
Nordjylland Power Station	Aalborg	57°04′29.9″N 10°02′21.8″E	411	Coal	1977	Aalborg Forsyning
Avedøre Power Station	Avedøre	55.602761°N 12.47925°E	806	Biomass, natural gas, oil	1990	Ørsted
Viborg Power Station	Viborg	56°28′25.88″N 9°24′54.4″E	57	Natural gas	1996	Energi Viborg
Lisbjerg Power Station	Lisbjerg	56°13′40″N 10°09′30″E	154	Biomass, municipal waste	1978	AffaldVarme Aarhus
Skærbæk Power Station	Skærbæk	55°30′40″N 9°36′47.6″E	392	Biomass, natural gas, oil	1951	Ørsted

== Non-thermal ==
For offshore power stations, see List of offshore wind farms in Denmark.

== See also ==
- Energy in Denmark
