= Studstrup =

Town in Denmark

- Town
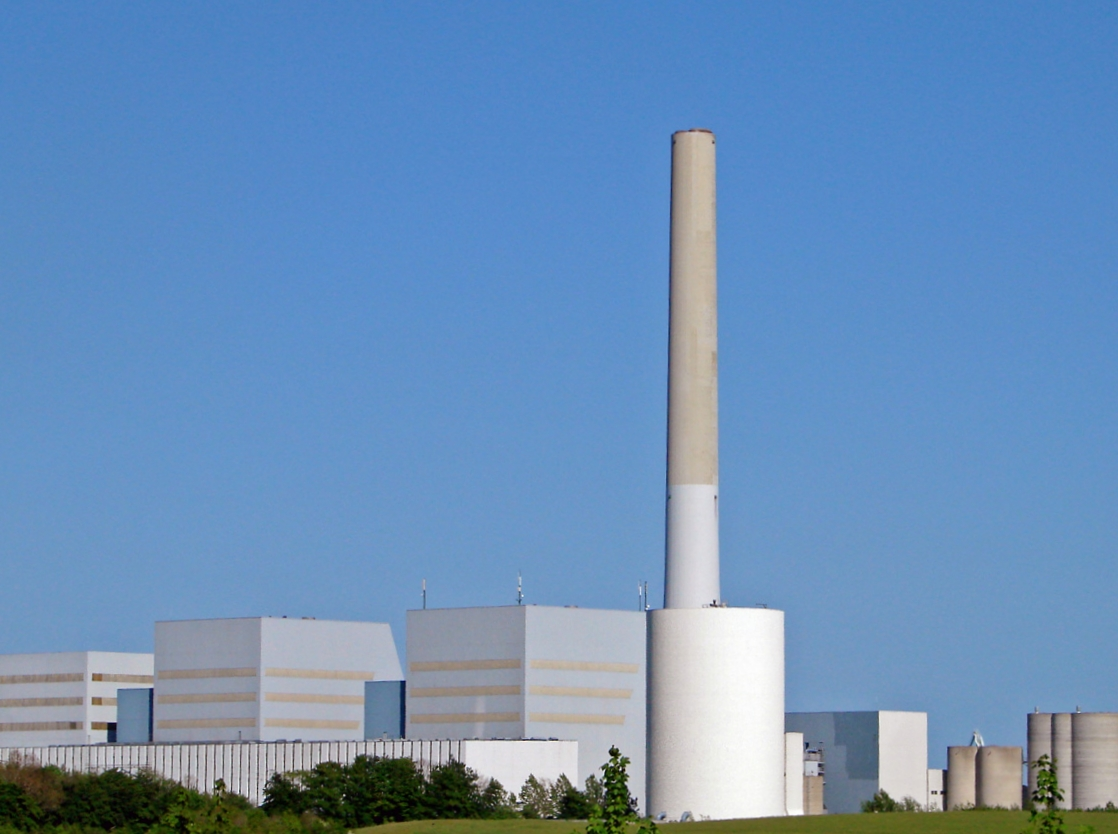
- Studstrupværket power plant, with its 190 meters tall smokestack, is a landmark for Studstrup.

- Location in Central Denmark Region Studstrup (Denmark)
- Coordinates: 56.25790°N 10.3384°E
- Country: Denmark
- Region: Central Denmark Region
- Municipality: Aarhus Municipality

Population (2026)
  - Total: 816
- Time zone: UTC+1 (CET)
  - Summer (DST): UTC+2 (CEST)

Studstrup is the northernmost suburb of Aarhus, Denmark with a population of 816 (1 January 2026).

Studstrup is home to the 700 MW power plant Studstupværket. The smoke stack is a landmark across the entire Aarhus Bay area.

Immediately south of the power plant is the marina Kaløvig Bådehavn.
