= Viborg Power Station =

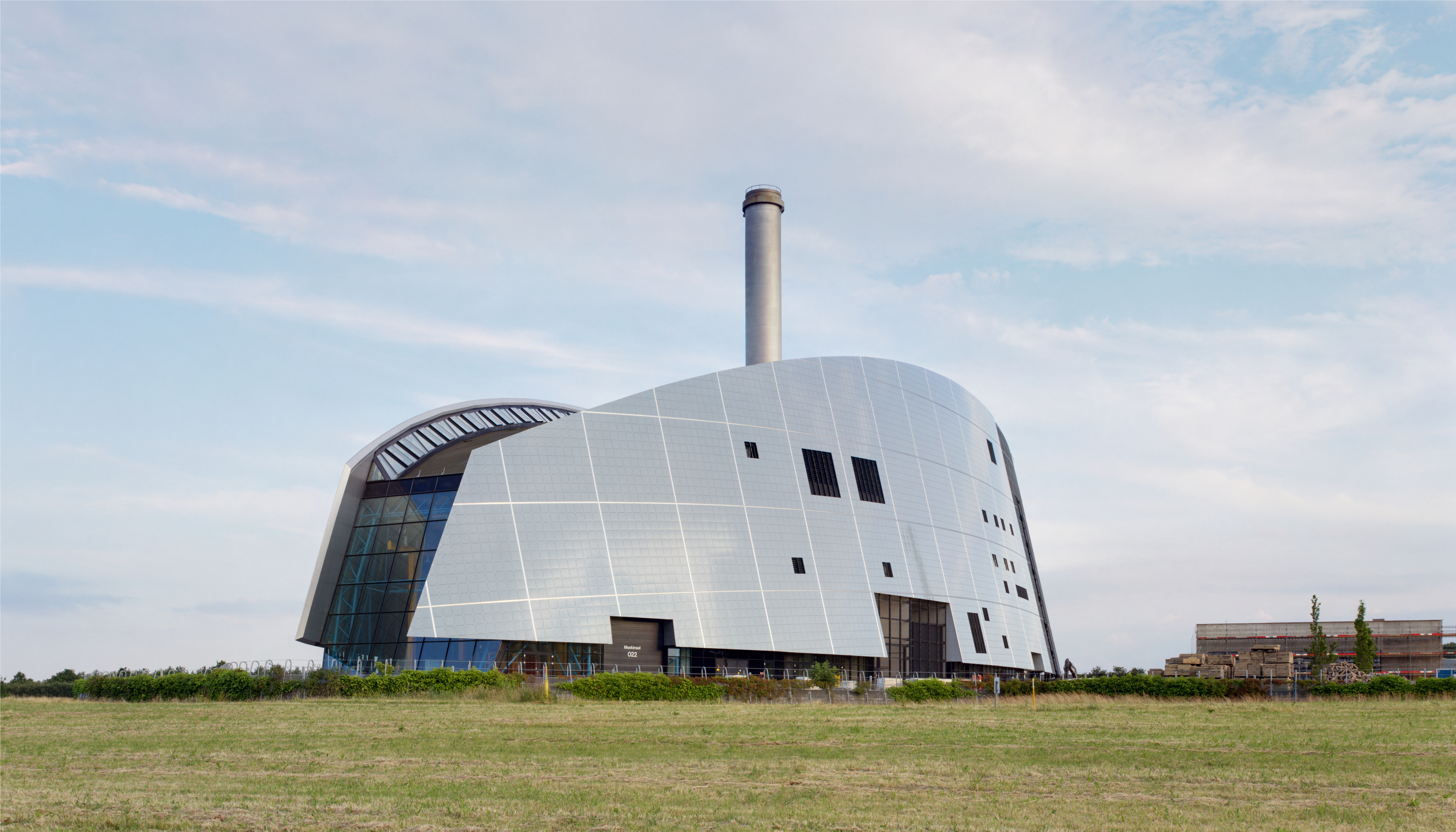
- Viborg Power Station in July 2014 (photo by Kim Hansen)
- Country: Denmark
- Location: Viborg
- Coordinates: 56°28′25.88″N 9°24′54.4″E
- Status: Operational
- Commission date: 1996
- Owner: Energi Viborg

Thermal power station
- Primary fuel: Natural gas
- Combined cycle?: Yes
- Cogeneration?: Yes

Power generation
- Nameplate capacity: 57 MW

External links
- Commons: Related media on Commons

Viborg Power Station (Danish: Viborg Kraftvarmeværk) is a natural gas-fired power station operated by Energi Viborg in Viborg, Denmark.

It can provide 57 MW of electric power from a General Electric Frame 6 gas turbine and a W.H.Allen steam turbine, and 57 MJ/s of district heating. It is used about 5,000 hours per year. The hot water tank contains 19,000 m^{3}, suitable for 15 hours of cold weather consumption.

The station is to be used as a hub for distributing district heating from the coming Apple data center near Foulum and Tjele. Consultants calculate that the best economy for Viborg's district heating is a system where Apple's cooling water is used to provide heat for 7 MWe heat pumps at the data center delivering 55 MJ/s of heating (and cooling for Apple), with an overall Coefficient of performance of 8. The transmission water temperature is raised from 30 to 50 °C and then pipelined 10 km to Viborg, where further heat pumps raise (and keep) the local heat to 60 °C. The start cost is estimated at DKK 316 million, and running costs of DKK 265/MWh, compared to the 2017 price of DKK 413/MWh and natural gas at over DKK 500/MWh. Conversely, Apple's cooling water is lowered in temperature by the heat pumps. Viborg's expected heat demand is between 10 MJ/s in summer and 90 MJ/s (peak) in winter, for an annual consumption of 307 GWh. The heating difference between the 55 MJ/s heat from Apple and the 90 MJ/s peak demand is covered by gas boilers.

== See also ==
- List of power stations in Denmark
