= Studstrup Power Station =

Biomass energy plant in western Denmark

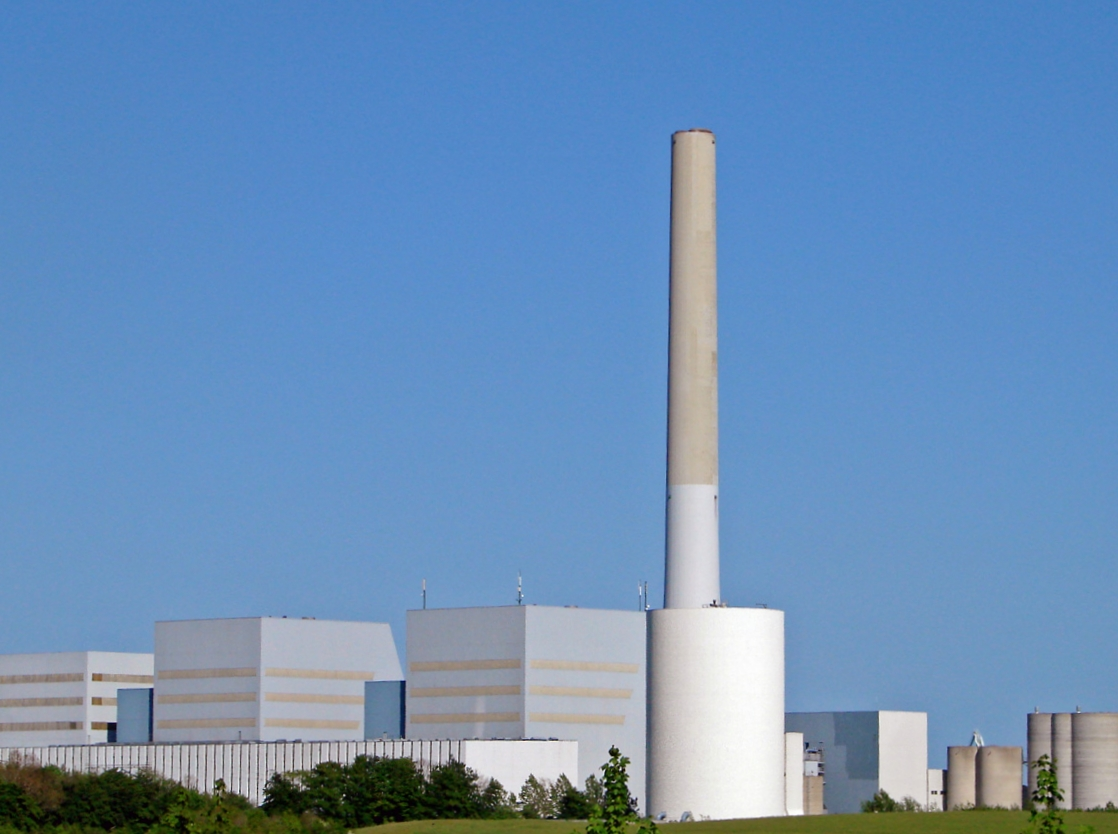
- Studstrup Power Station
- Country: Denmark
- Location: Studstrup
- Coordinates: 56°15′0.7″N 10°20′41.4″E
- Status: Operational
- Commission date: Unit 1: 1968; Unit 2: 1972; Unit 3: 1984; Unit 4: 1985
- Decommission date: Unit 1: decommissioned Unit 2: decommissioned Unit 4: 31 August 2024
- Owner: Ørsted
- Operator: Ørsted

Thermal power station
- Primary fuel: Wood pellets
- Cogeneration?: Yes

Power generation
- Nameplate capacity: 700 MW
- Annual net output: 3,340 GWh (electricity 2006); 9,090 TJ (heat 2006)

External links
- Commons: Related media on Commons

The Studstrup Power Station (Danish: Studstrupværket) is a thermal power station at Studstrup, Aarhus Municipality, in Denmark. It is owned and operated by the Ørsted company and has an electrical generation capacity of 700 MWe. The chimney is 189.89 metres (623.0 ft) tall. The power station uses cleaned wastewater as coolant, and the residual heat is used for district heating; directed via pipes into Aarhus. The power station went in to service in 1968 as a coal-fuelled power station, but has been expanded and refitted a number of times since its inception. In 2016, one of two boilers was converted to biomass-fuelled, using wood chips and straw primarily.

== History ==
The plant was built as a coal-fired power plant with a single unit with a nameplate capacity of 152 MWe electricity. It was inaugurated 18 October 1968 by Queen of Denmark Margrethe II. The chimney is 124 metres (407 ft) tall. The plant was originally owned and operated by I/S Midtkraft.

In 1972, boiler unit 2 with a nameplate capacity of 262 MWe electricity was commissioned. It had a second 124 metres (407 ft) tall chimney.

Two extra coal-fired units, unit 3 and 4, was commissioned in 1984 and 1985. Both of them are combined heat and power plants, each with a nameplate capacity of 380 MWe electricity and 455 MJ/s heat. The two units use a combined 190 metres (620 ft) tall chimney.

In 2000, I/S Midtkraft, along with five other power plant companies and the distribution company ELSAM I/S, fused to become Elsam A/S. In 2006, Elsam A/S was taken over by DONG Energy.

Unit 4 was expanded to burn straw as a supplement to coal in 2001. Unit 3 followed with the same conversion in 2005.

Between 2014 and 2016, unit 3 was converted from coal and straw to wood pellets. A new silo with a capacity of 65000 tons wood pellets, and an 800m conveyor transport system, was constructed. Unit 3 can still be fired on coal, but due to taxes, it is only profitable to do when there is no demand for heat.

Unit 4 was decommissioned in April 2022, but in October 2022 the decommission was postponed to 31 August 2024, due the energy crisis in Europe.

=== Accidents ===
From 22 September until 20 October 2022, a fire was accidentally active in the large silo containing wood pellets, sending up large plumes of smoke. Nearby towns had at times to be evacuated, while the firefighting was ongoing. The silo contained 55.000 tons of wood pellets when the fire broke out.

Units
	Commission	Fuel	Electric capacity [MWe]	Heat capacity [MJ/s]	Decommission
Unit 1	1968	Coal	152	0	Decommissioned
Unit 2	1972		262	0	Decommissioned
Unit 3	1984	Coal	380	455	Active
Unit 3	2005	Coal and Straw	380	455	Active
Unit 3	2016	Wood pellets and Coal	380	455	Active
Unit 4	1984	Coal	380	455	31 August 2024
Unit 4	2001	Coal and Straw	380	455	31 August 2024

== See also ==
- List of power stations in Denmark
