= Bay of Aarhus =

Bay in Denmark

Coordinates: 56.15°N 10.29°E

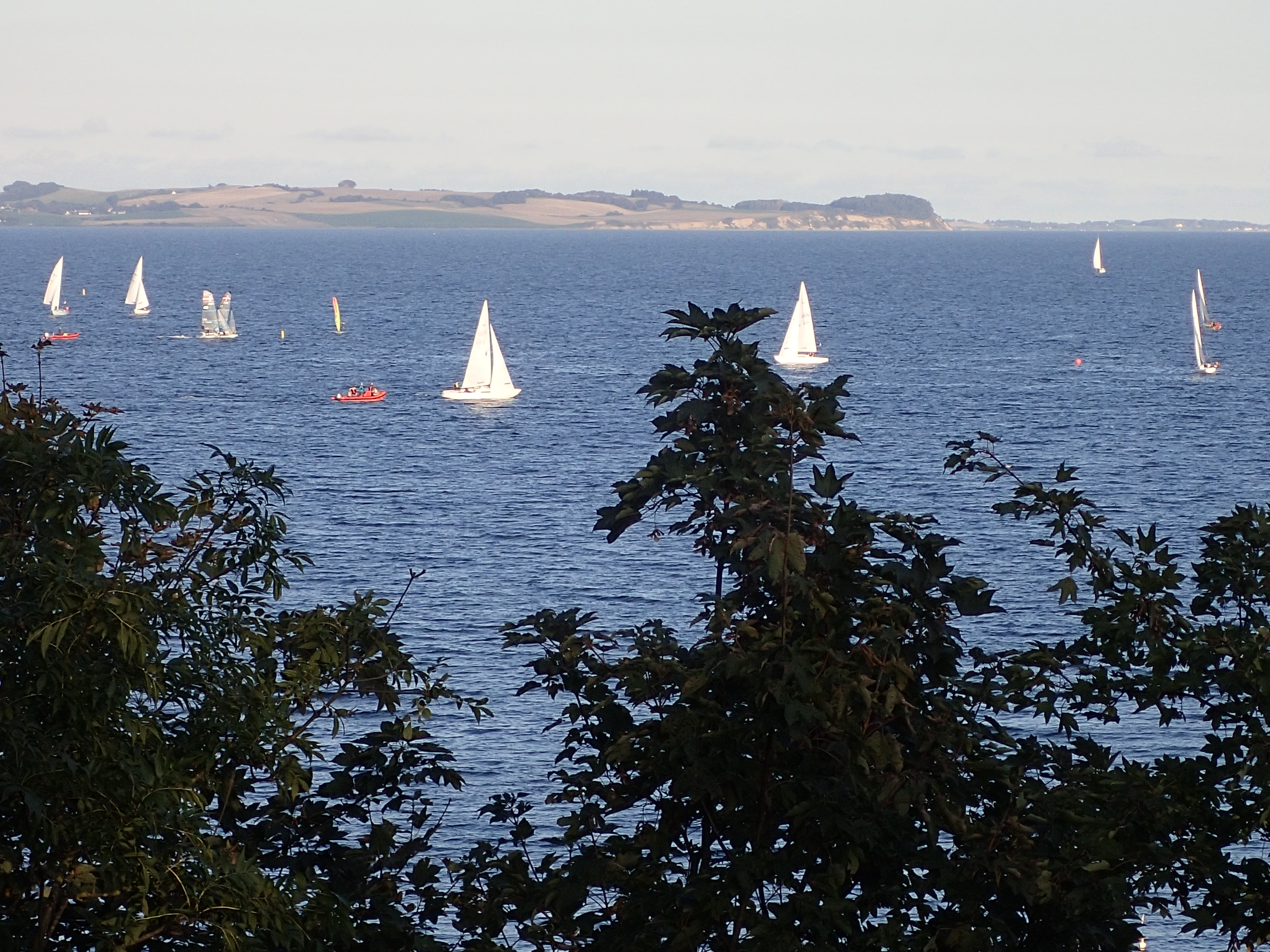
Bay of Aarhus

The Bay of Aarhus, or Aarhus Bay, is a Danish waterway by Aarhus in eastern Jutland.

The Bay of Aarhus is bounded by Kalø Vig in the north, Sletterhage and Helgenæs in the east, Samsø and Tunø to the south and the east Jutland coast to the west. The bay stretches over an area of 610 square kilometres (240 sq mi) and consists of a flat bassin, increasing in depth from 14 m in the west to 18 m in the east. The bay mainly exchanges water with the Kattegat through a deep trench along Helgenæs with depths to 50 m. In the bay's southern section there are a number of stony reefs including Norsminde Flak, Wulffs Flak, Mejlflak and Tunø Knob. These reefs, and the islands of Tunø and Samsø, prevents an open connection with the Belt Sea.

== Environmental issues ==
In 2002, the inner Danish waters suffered serious and prolonged hypoxia with the Bay of Aarhus being hit especially hard. Studies by the National Environmental Research Institute of Denmark (DMU) in November 2002 and March 2003 showed large areas with noticeable damage to marine life, especially around the areas of Kalø Vig and the western sections of the bay.

In 2013, planning for an offshore windmill park in the bay on the shallow reef of Mejlflak between Tunø, Samsø, and Helgenæs was initiated, scheduled to be completed in 2017. In September 2015, the project was put on hold indefinitely as it was not found profitable for energy company NRGi.

== Gallery ==
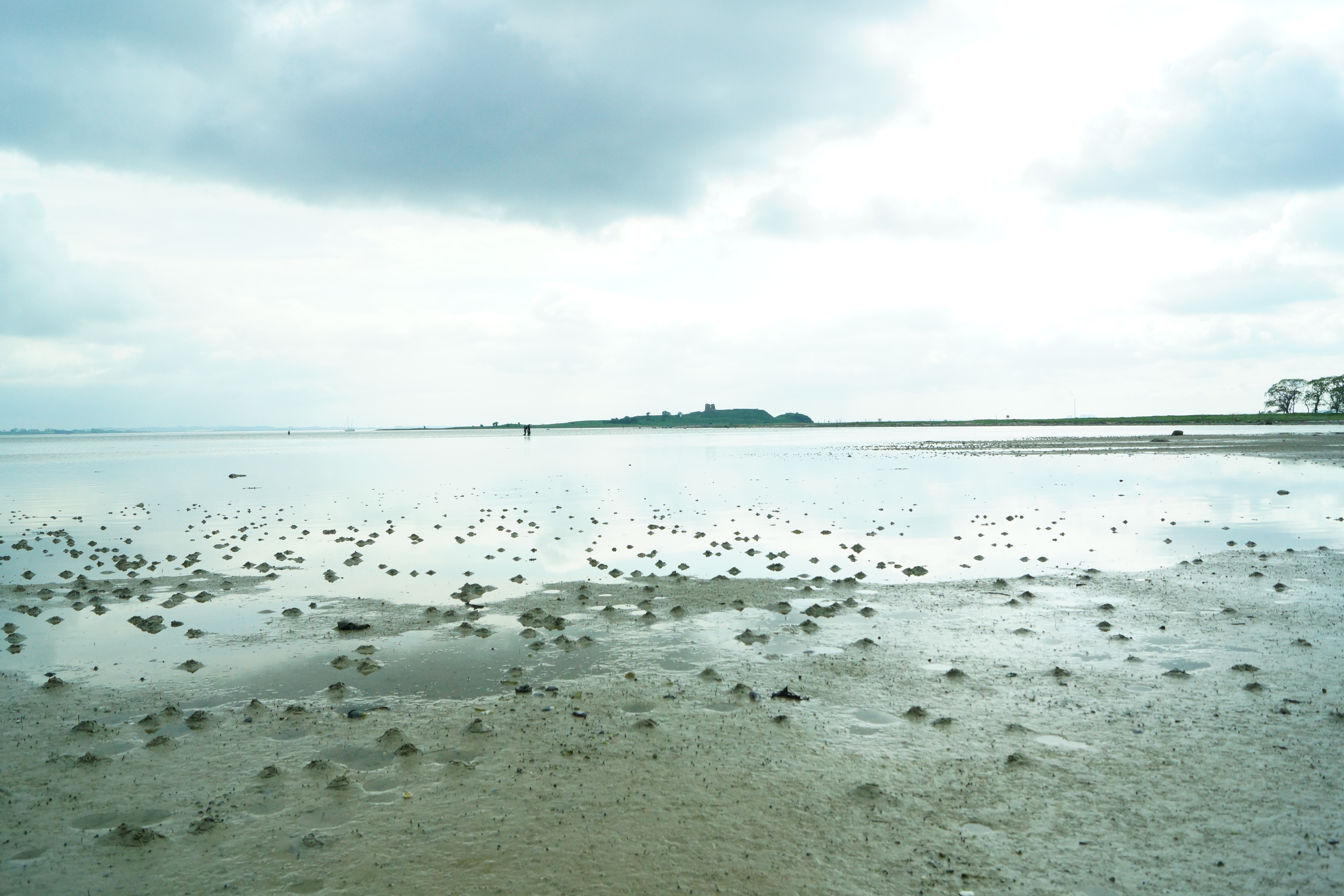
The Bay of Aarhus has several shallow coves (Egens Vig at Kalø Castle).

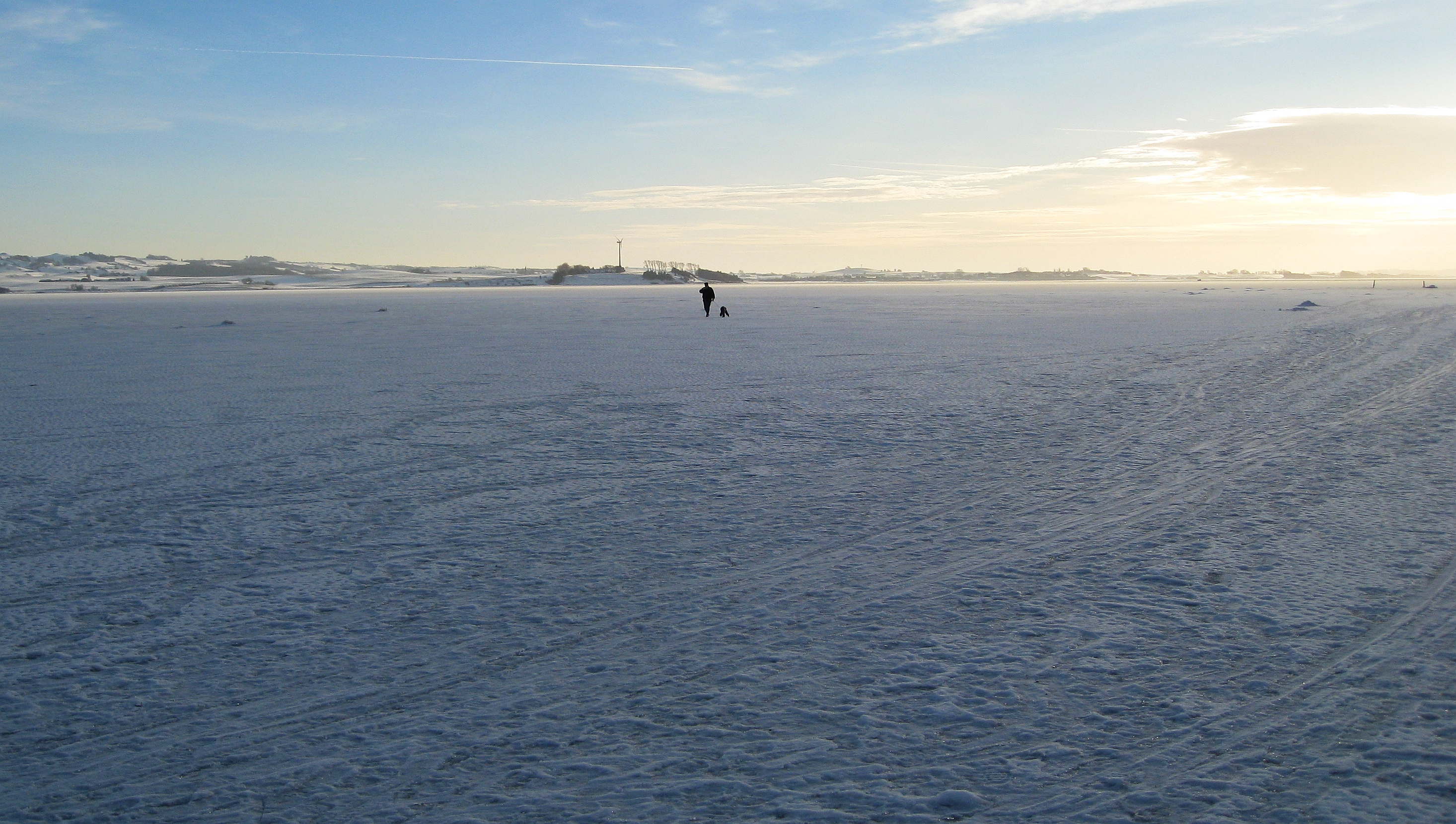
The Bay of Aarhus rarely freezes up in winter, but some of the shallow coves do occasionally (Egens Vig).

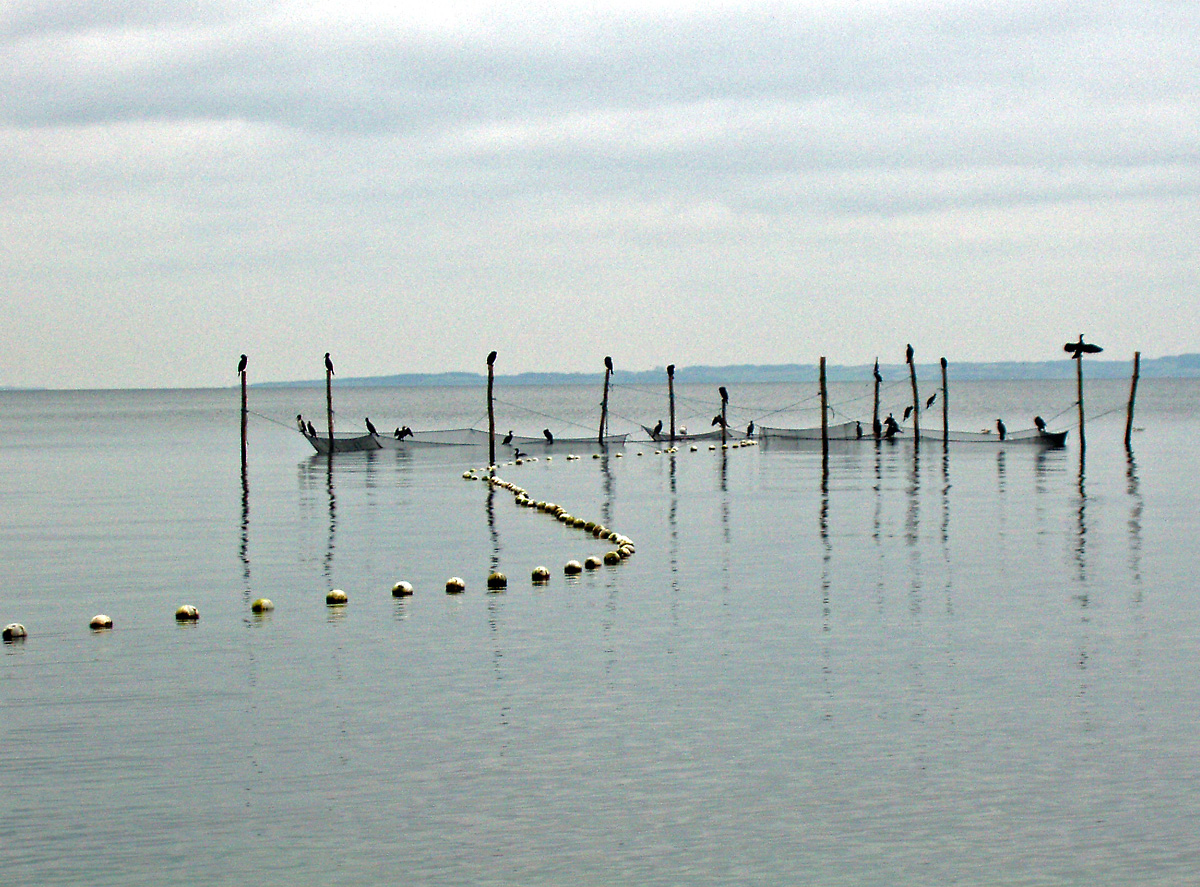
Sustainable fishing. Commercial fishing in the bay has almost vanished, due in part to ecological collapse.

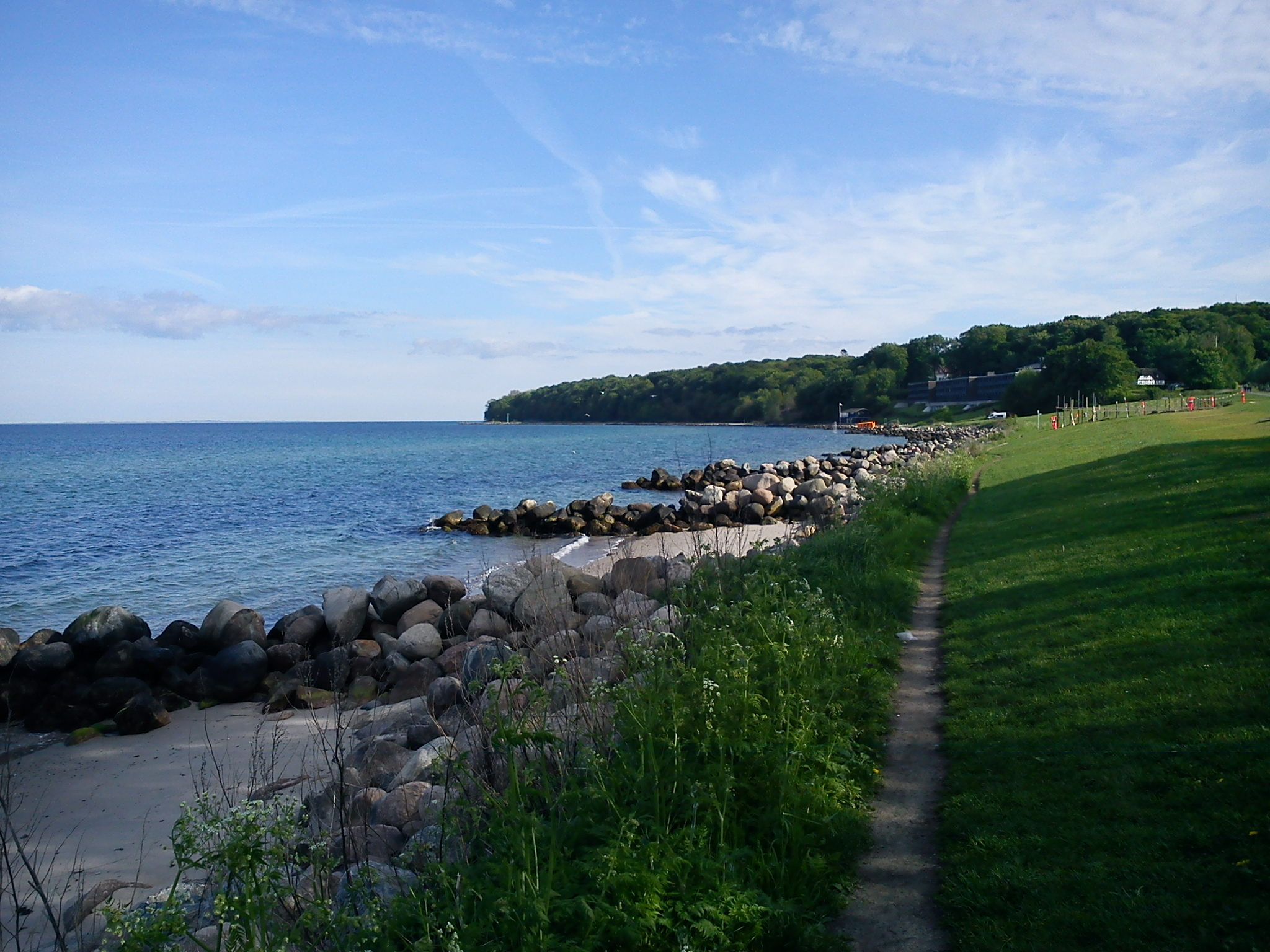
Around the city of Aarhus, the coast has been secured from erosion.

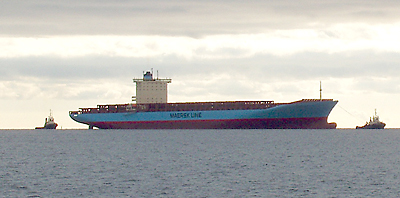
The port of Aarhus has heavy traffic.

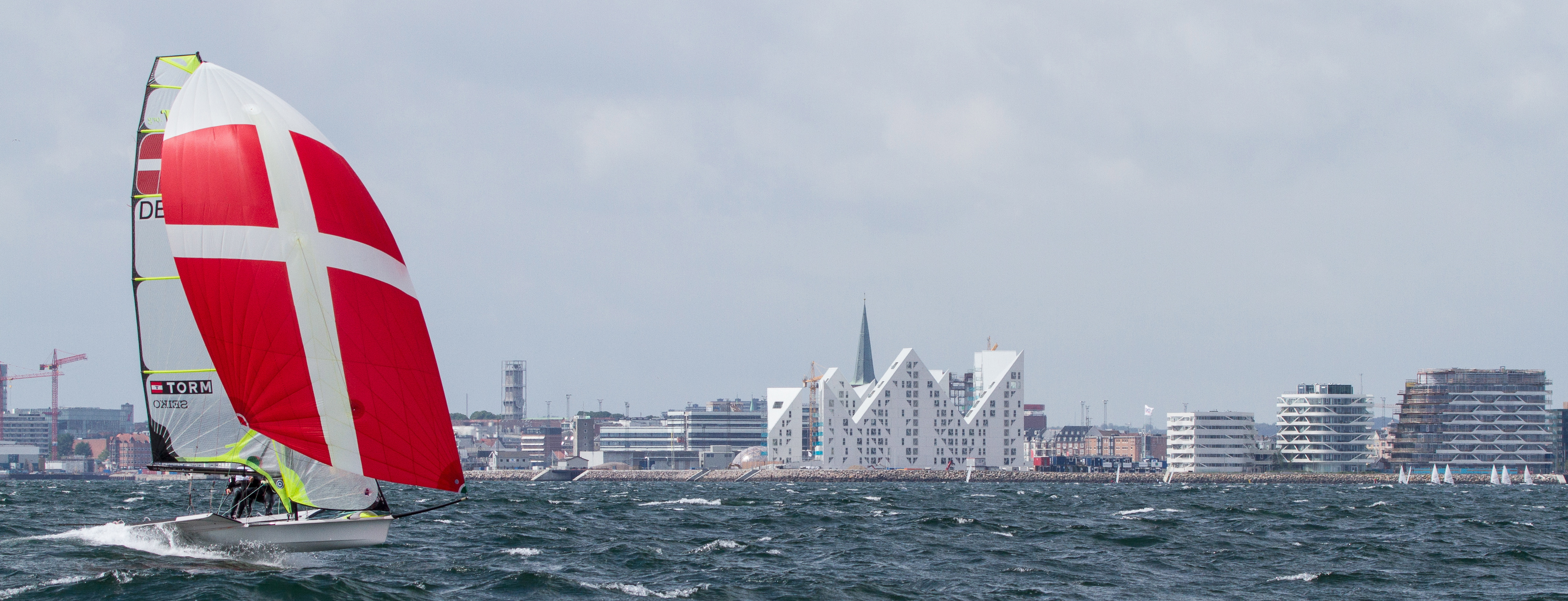
The bay is very popular for watersports.

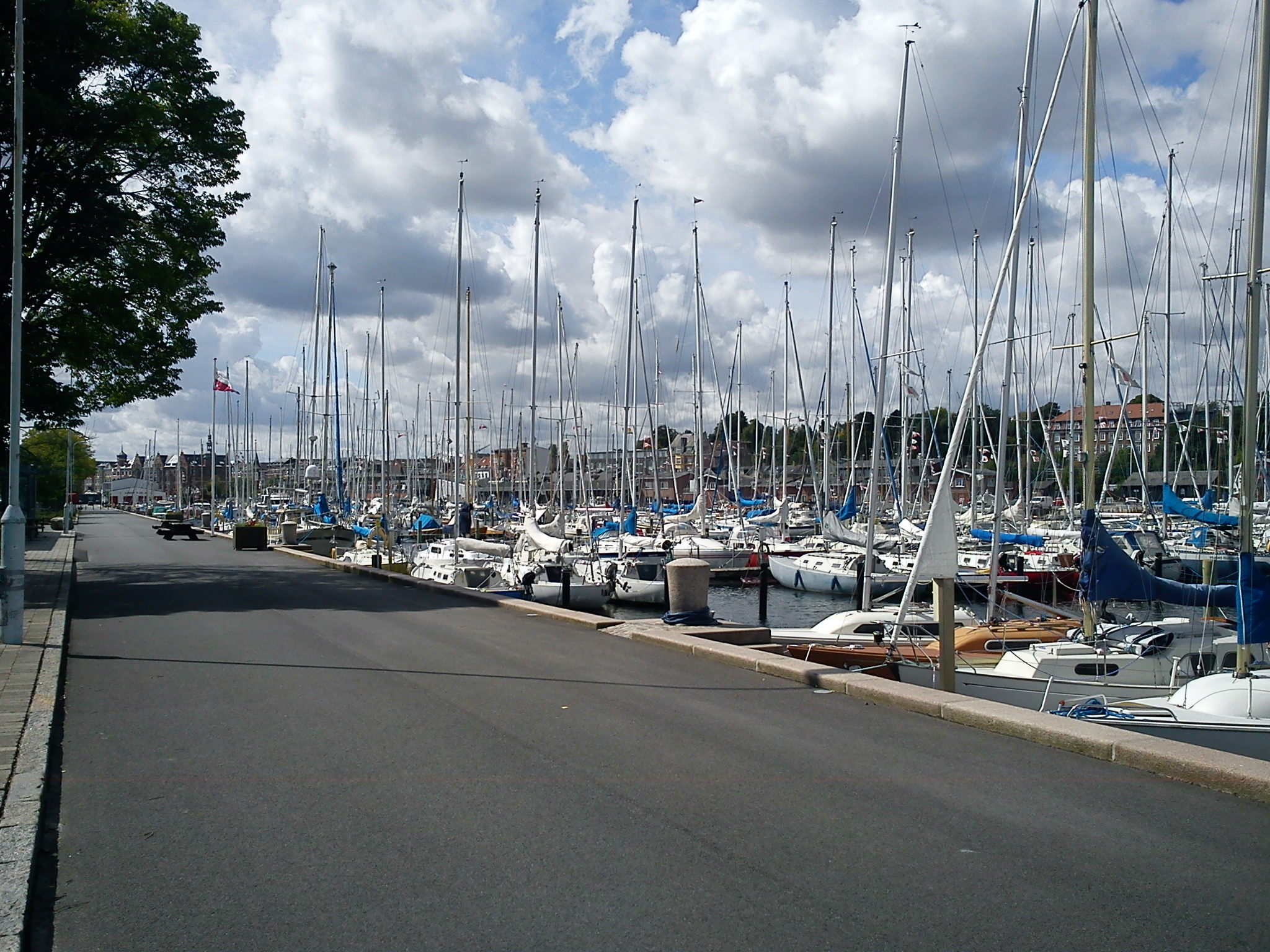
The bay has several marinas, with two in the port of Aarhus alone (Aarhus Lystbådehavn).

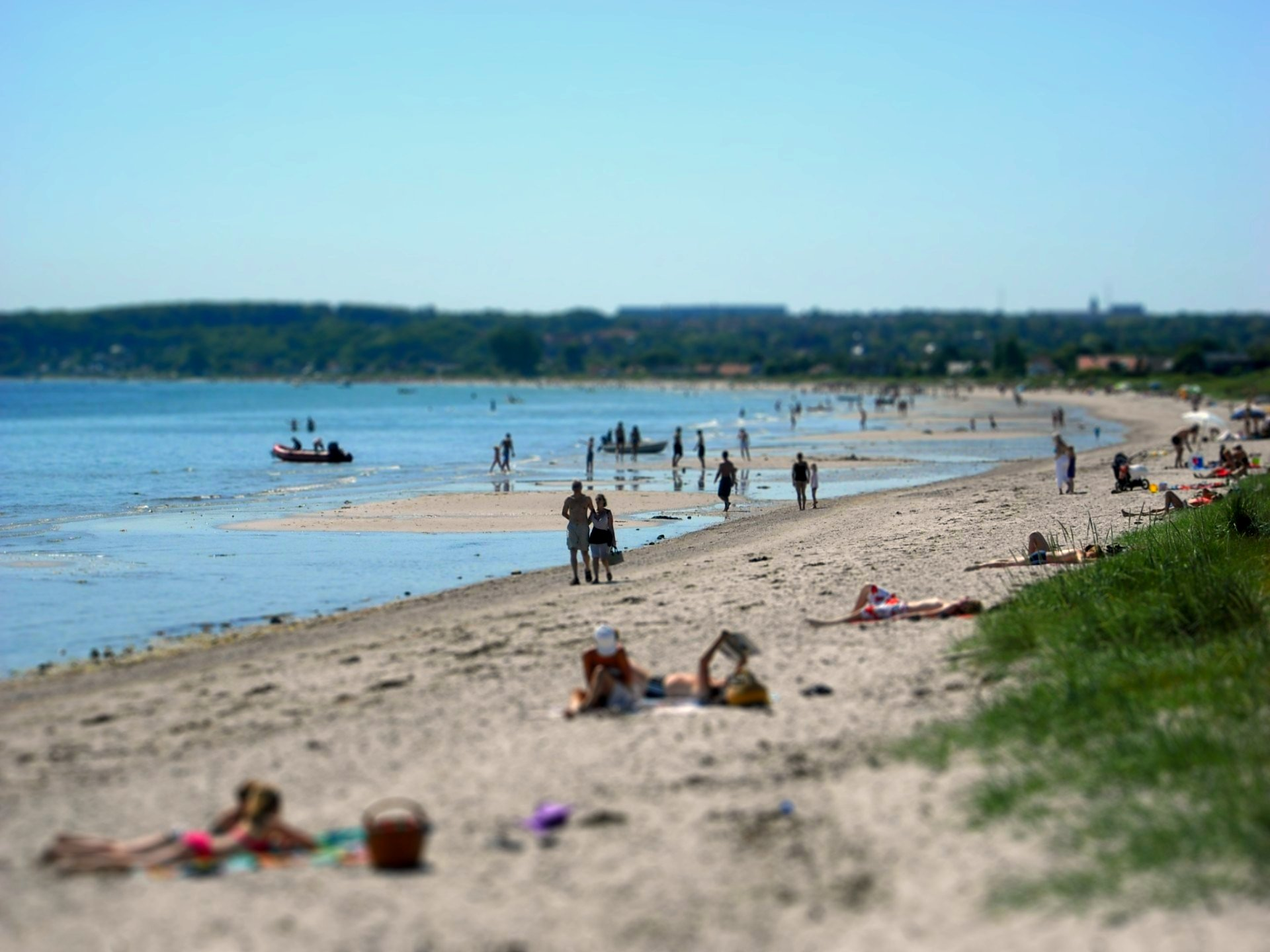
Sandy beaches form most of the coastline of the bay.

== See also ==
- Tunø Knob Offshore Wind Farm
