= Kalø Castle =

Ruined castle in Jutland, Denmark

Kalø Ruin
- Mols Bjerge National Park
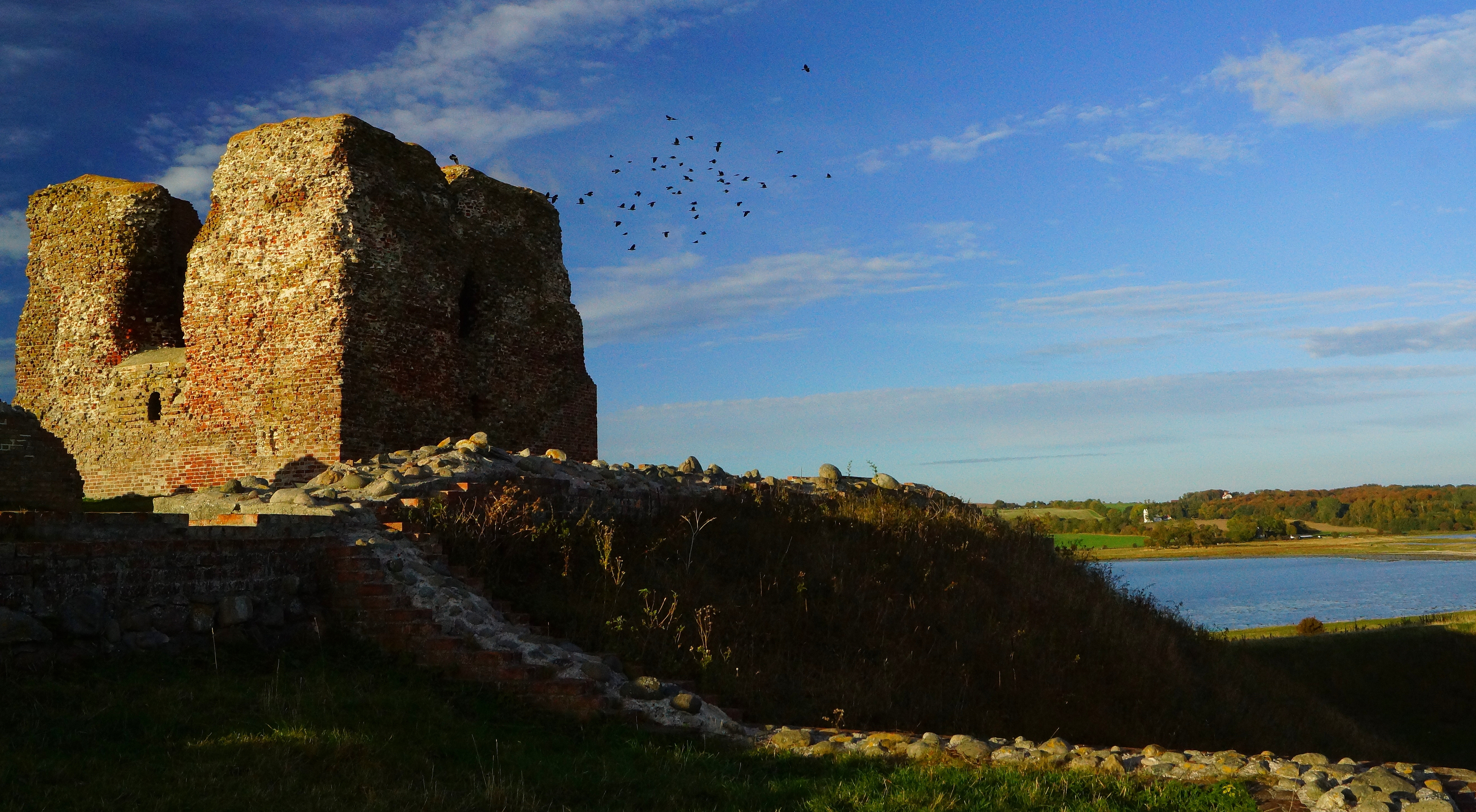

Site information
- Type: lowland castle
- Owner: The State of Denmark
- Controlled by: the Danish Crown
- Open to the public: yes
- Condition: Ruin

Location
- Coordinates: 56.2744°N 10.4669°E

Site history
- Built: 1313
- Built by: Erik Menved (Erik VI), local slave labour
- Materials: bricks, stone

Kalø Castle (Danish: Kalø Slot) is a ruined castle located in eastern Jutland, in Denmark, 20 km from the city of Aarhus within Mols Bjerge National Park.

== History ==
The castle was constructed in 1313 by the Danish king Erik Menved (Erik VI). It was one of at least four similar strongholds in Jutland, constructed to counter the ongoing rebellions of the Jutlandic nobility and peasantry against the Crown. The other strongholds were Borgvold in Viborg, Bygholm in Horsens and Ulstrup, east of Struer. All were built by local peasants forced labour, with the goal of breaking their rebellious spirits. Kalø Slot was raised on the small island of Kalø, connected to the mainland by a 500 m-long (1,600 ft) artificial embankment, rising 1.2 m (3 ft 11 in) above sea level. The embankment was cobbled; deep moats were dug and earth mounds heaped around the fortress. A port of call, outer ringwalls and other fortifications were all built by hand. This was a colossal task in the early 14th century.

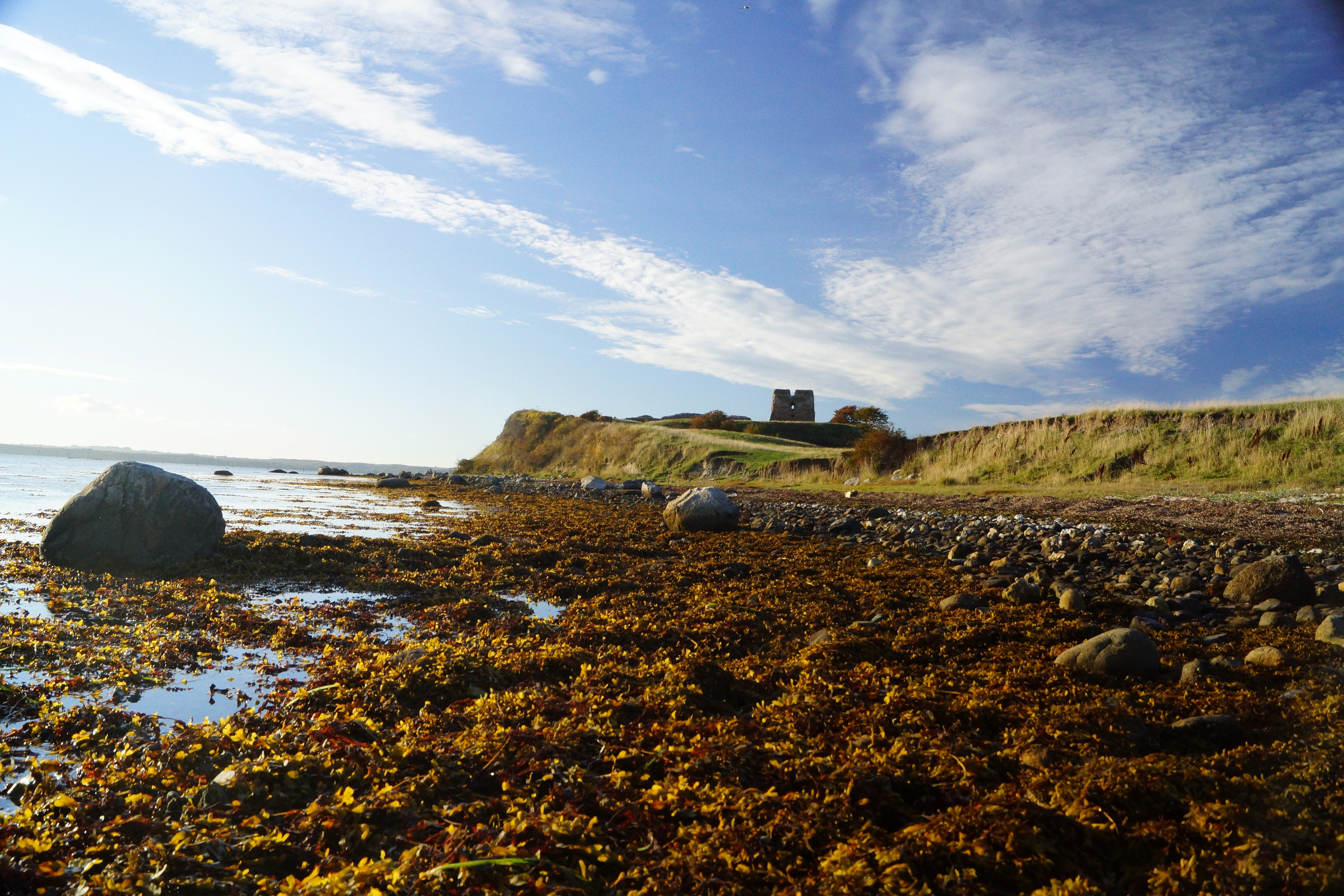
Kaloe Castle Ruin lies on a peninsula 30 km north of Aarhus in Denmark

The castle of Kalø was successful in its original purpose, but already in 1320 the new king Christoffer II, was forced by the Danish nobility in a coronation charter to tear it down, along with most of the Crown's fortresses in Jutland. It is not clear how much of the castle was actually torn down, but the Crown definitely lost its grip on Kalø and it was mortgaged. From the 15th century and onwards, Kalø had a more peaceful role, as the local administrative center and state prison. King Christian II held the future Swedish king Gustav Vasa captive at Kalø during 1518-1519, until he escaped and fled to Lübeck, disguised as a common peasant.

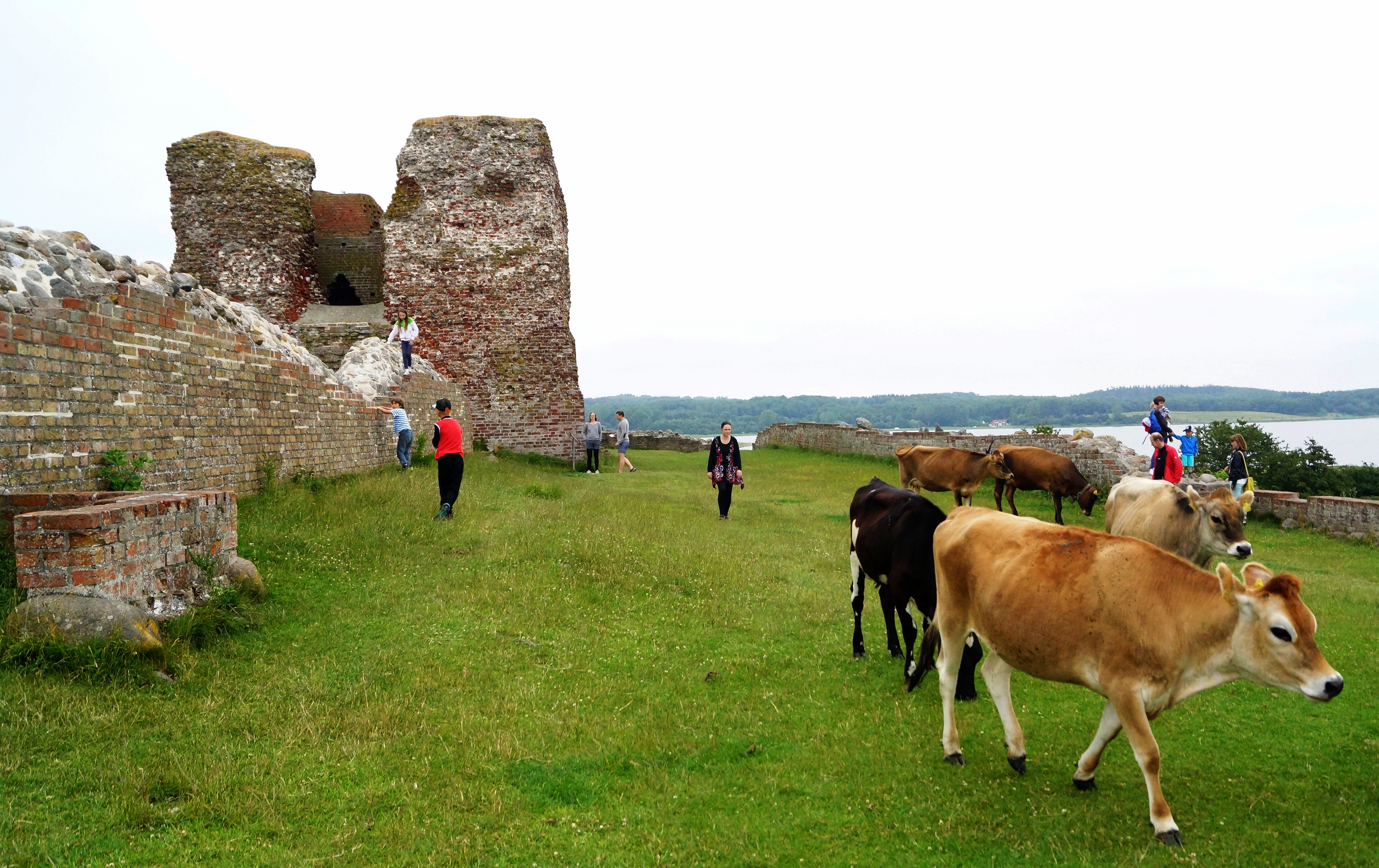
Cows and tourists

When King Frederick III converted the elective monarchy into an absolute monarchy in the revolution of 1660 in Denmark, Kalø Slot lost its function. The buildings had fallen into decay under the Swedish occupation during the wars between Sweden and Denmark in the years 1643 to 1645. In 1662, Ulrik Frederik Gyldenløve, Count of Laurvig, decided to tear down the abandoned ruin when he received it from his father, Frederick III. The useful materials were used to build his private palace in Copenhagen, now called the Charlottenborg Palace.

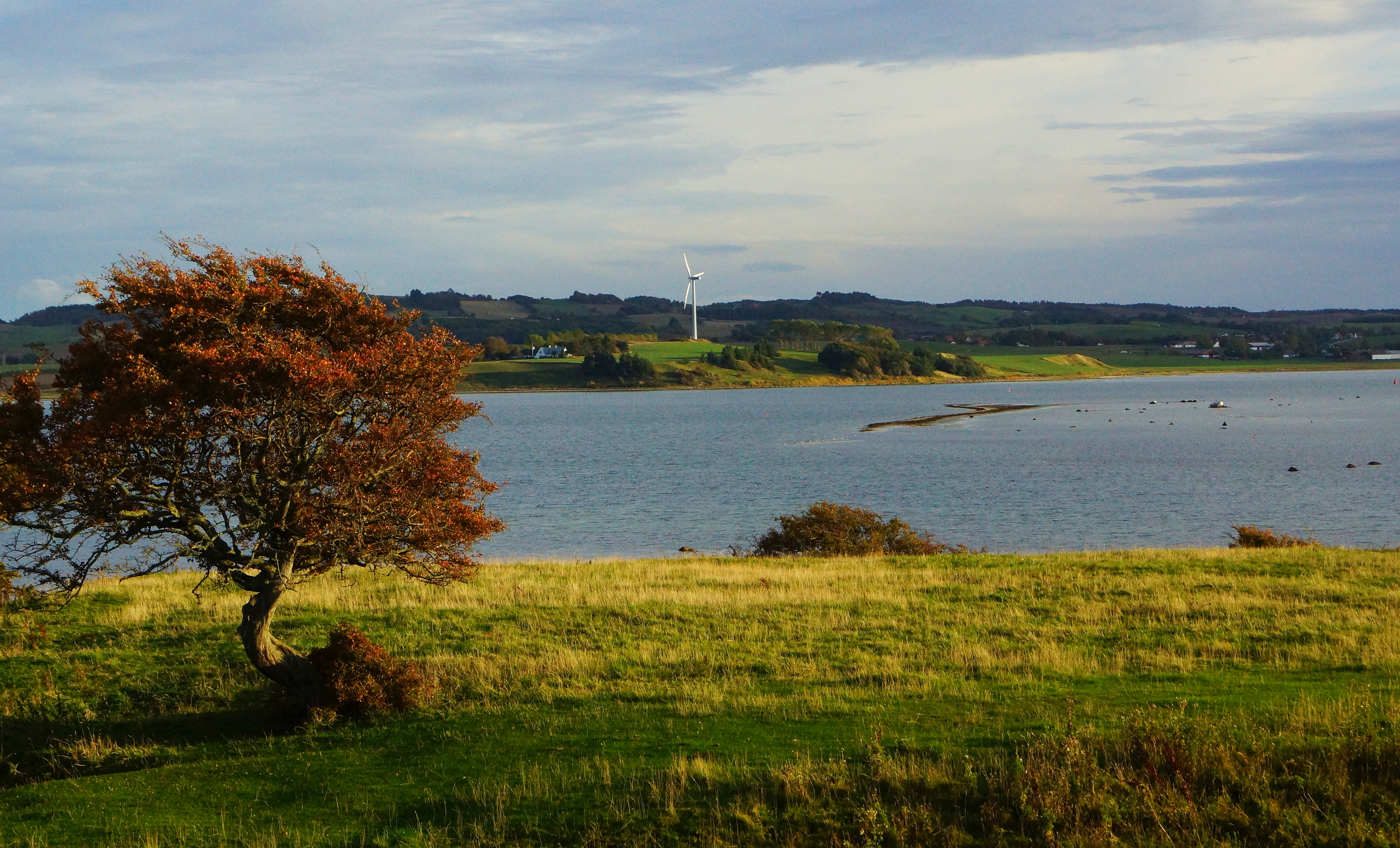
Easterly view from the castle across Egens Vig (Bight of The Oak).

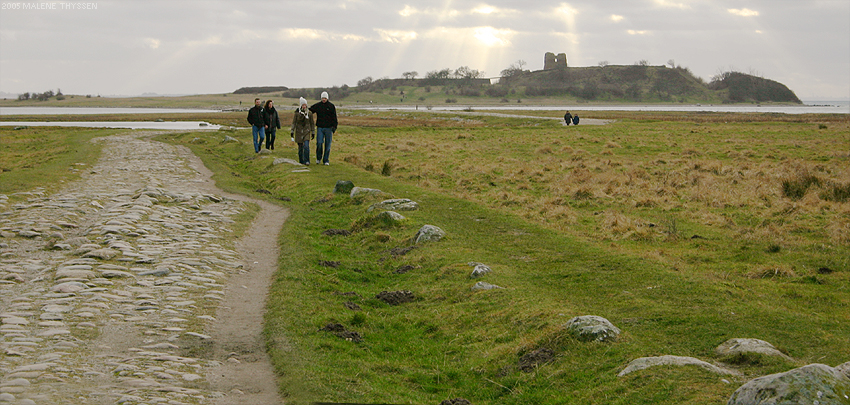
The cobbled embankment leading to Kalø

Kalø and Kalø Slot were declared protected as early as the 1800s (decade), and the restoration process was initiated in the year 1903, led by architect C. M. Smidt from the National Museum of Denmark. A memorial stone with his name has been placed next to the riding ground. The restoration proceeded through World War II, when the German marines used Kalø as a target for gunboat shooting practice. Fortunately, the ruins were only slightly damaged.

Today, Kalø and Kalø Slot are owned by the Danish State and are protected. In 2009 the area was incorporated into the Mols Bjerge National Park.

== Etymology ==
The peninsula with the castle ruin is named 'Kalø' - 'Kal' has hitherto been written as 'Kalf' and is probably an older version of the modern Danish word 'Kalv' meaning calf, and 'ø' - meaning, island, in Danish. It is unclear if the island was named calf-island, because peasants used to send their cattle there, or if the small island was poetically perceived as a calf lying next to the mainland, representing the cow. This later use of the word calf has been quite common in Denmark and was often applied when a smaller island was placed next to a larger one. The island is a natural formation. In Lillebælt between Jutland and Fyn a small island is likewise called, Fænø Kalv - calf of the bigger island, Fænø.

== In literature ==
Kalø slot is part of some acclaimed Danish novels:

- Steen Steensen Blicher (1829): The Rector of Veilbye.
- Carit Etlar (1877): Fangen på Kalø. About Gustav Vasas imprisonment.
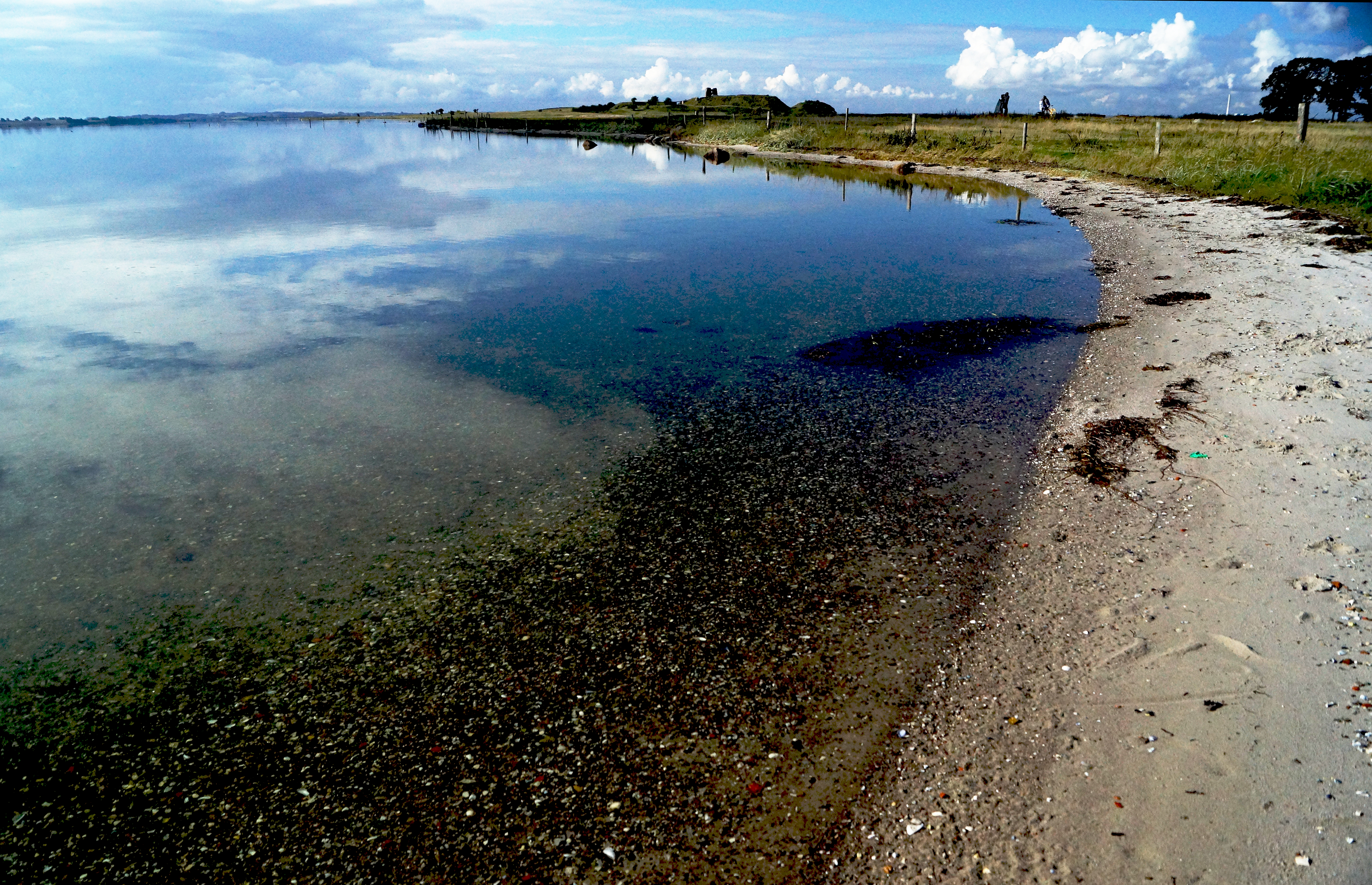
View of the beach from the nearby parking lot.

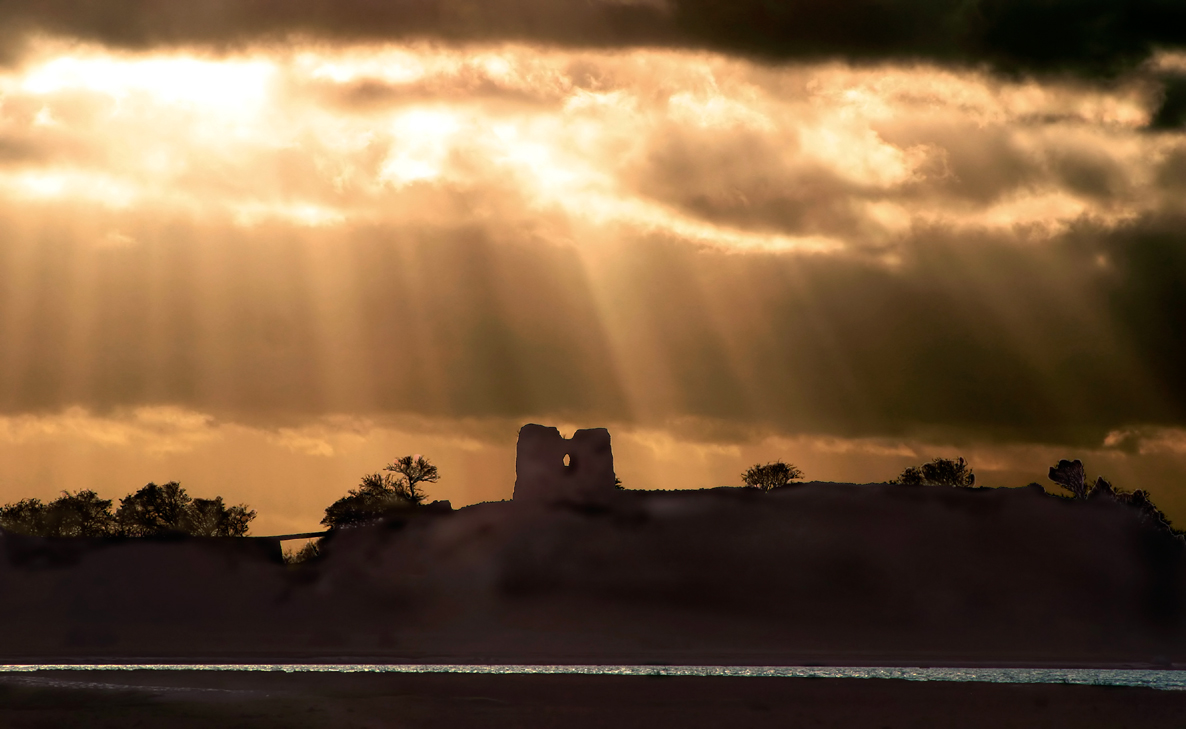
Kalø Castle.

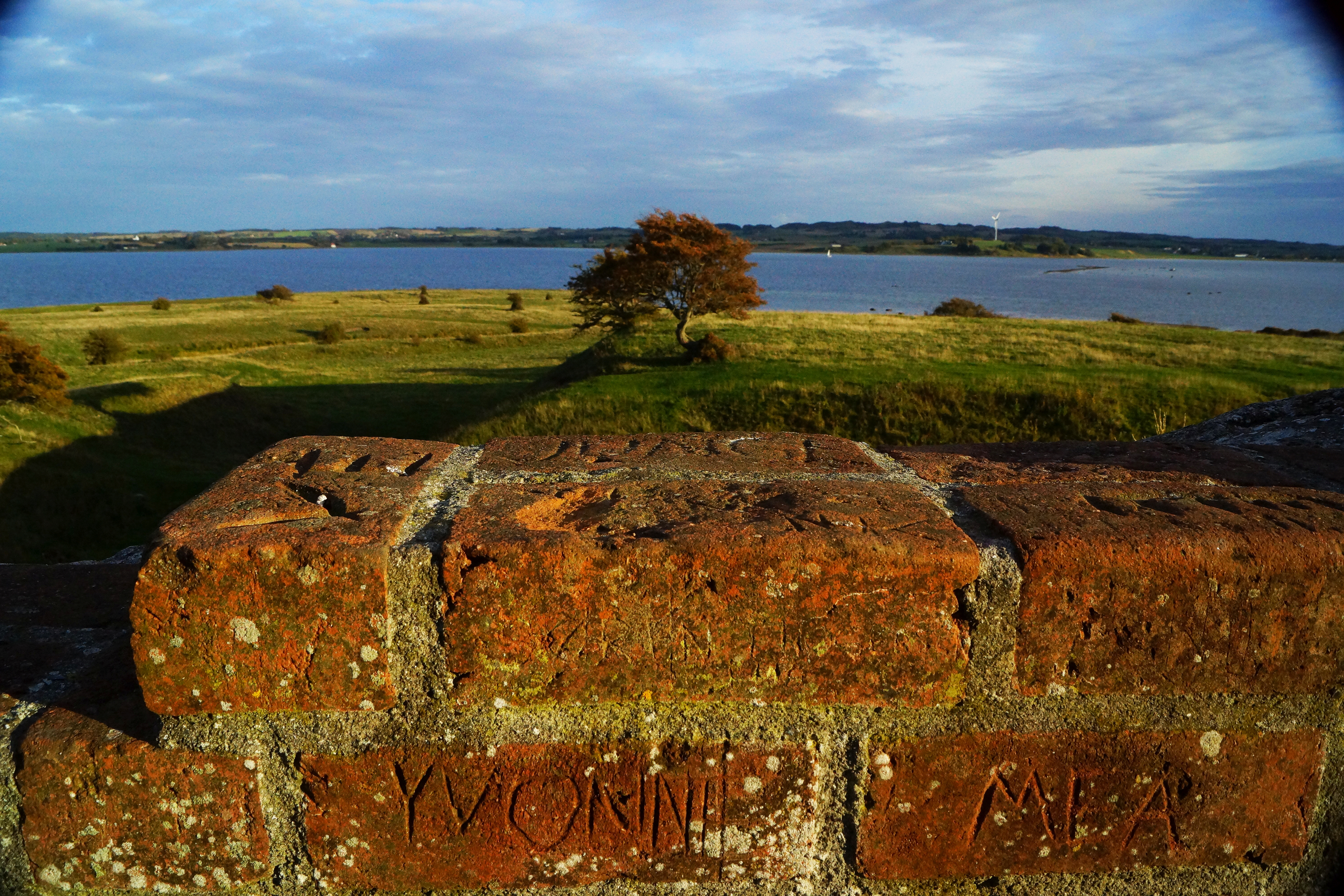
View from the ruin. Bricks have been a preferred building material in Denmark for almost a millennium.

== Sources and external links ==
- Kalø Danish Nature Agency (in Danish)
- Kalø pdf-pamphlet (2008), Danish Nature Agency (in Danish)
- Kalø castleruin Danske Fortidsminder, Danmarks KulturarvsForening. (in Danish)
- Kalø - the die-hard castle Multimedia-site hosted by the Danish Agency for Culture
- Kalø Slot - 360 degree Virtual Panorama Tour
