= Mols Bjerge National Park =

Danish national park

- IUCN category II (national park)
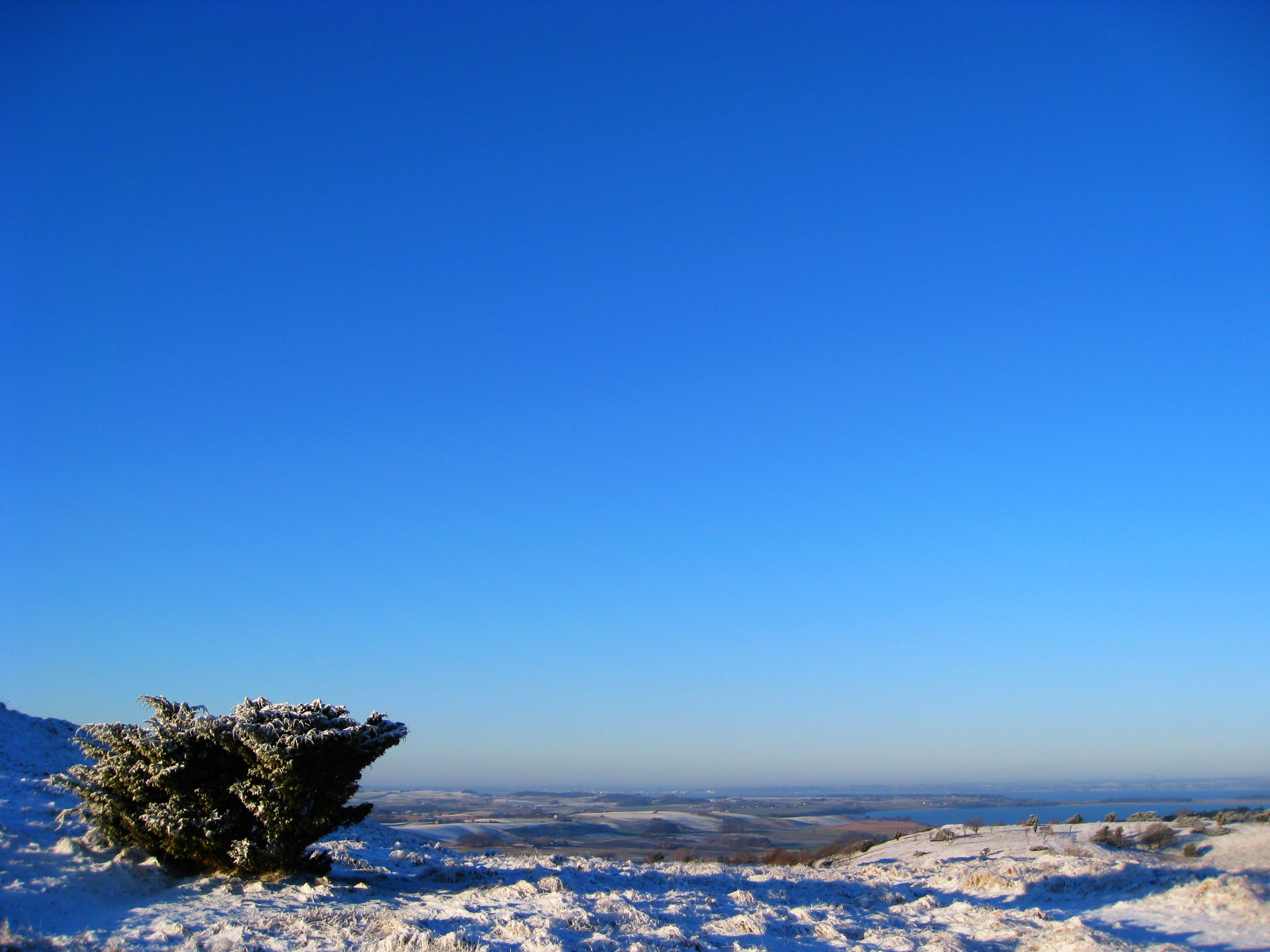
- Kalø Cove seen from Trehøje in the Mols Hills with Knebel Vig (foreground), Skødshoved (to the left)

- Location within Denmark
- Location: Syddjurs Municipality
- Nearest city: Ebeltoft
- Coordinates: 56°12′26.88″N 10°30′45.15″E
- Area: 180 km^{2} (69 sq mi)
- Established: 29 August 2009
- Website: Mols Bjerge National Park, Danish Nature Agency

Mols Bjerge National Park or Nationalpark Mols Bjerge is a Danish national park in the area known as Mols Bjerge (Mols Hills, lit.: Mols Mountains) in Syddjurs Municipality, Central Jutland, inaugurated on 29 August 2009. The protected area, measures 180 square kilometres (69 sq mi) in size. The Mols Hills, reaching a height of 137 metres (449 ft), are centrally located in the park, and take up 2,500 ha. "More than half of all wild Danish plant species" can be found at Mols Bjerge.

== Legal status ==
The creation of the park - Denmark's second - was announced by Minister of the Environment Troels Lund Poulsen on 17 January 2008. It was proposed that the park would be established under the Executive Order 789, dated 21 August 2009, into national law. The park was finally inaugurated by Queen Margrethe II on 29 August 2009.

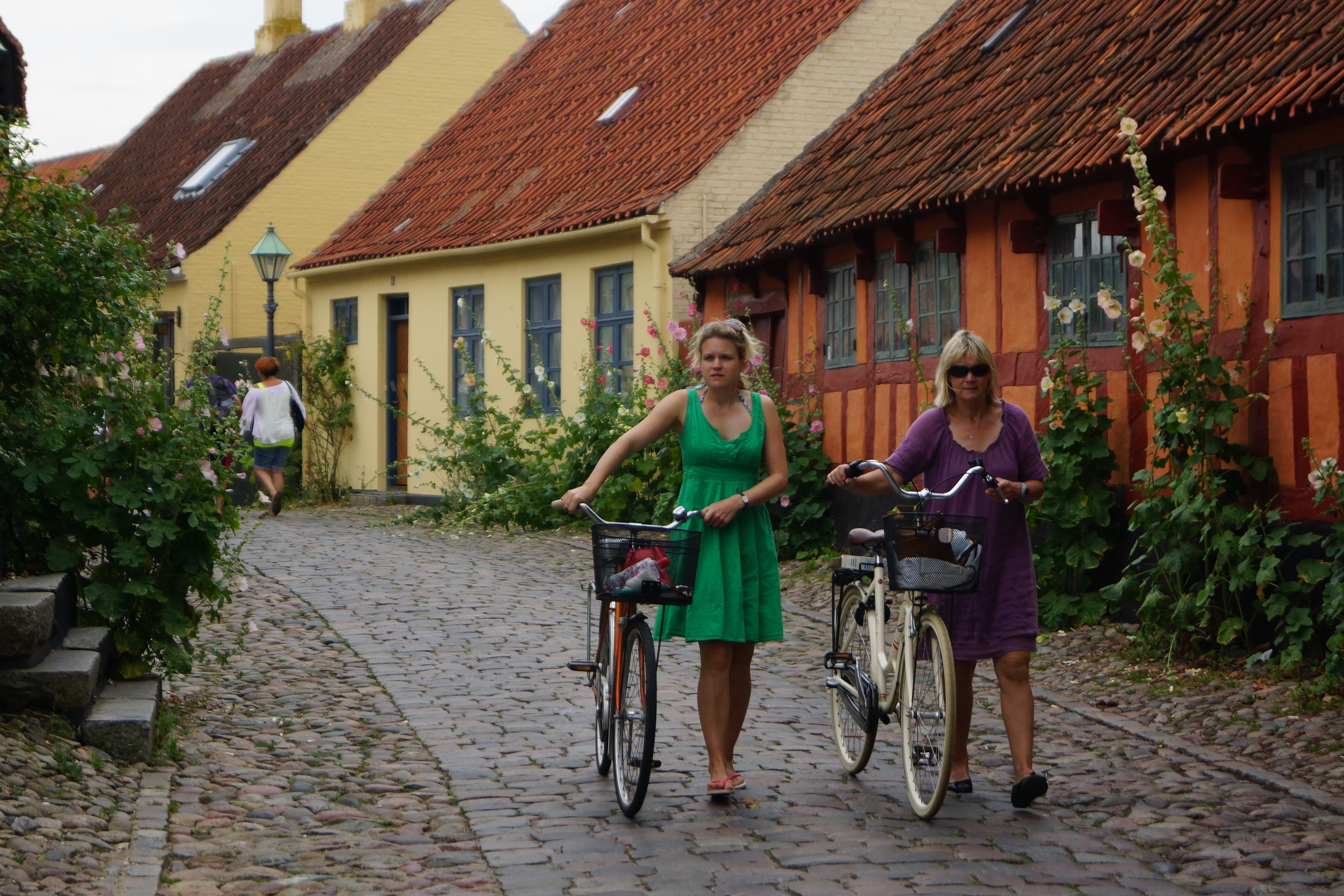
Ebeltoft, in the National Park, historical town centre

== Geography ==
The park comprises most of the southern parts of the headland of Djursland. It is bounded on the east by the sea of Kattegat, the forests of Kaløskovene in the west and to the south by multiple inlets, coves and plains of glacially generated moraine. The town of Ebeltoft, along with villages and summer house residence areas, is considered part of the park. Land in the national park is held under both private and state ownership. Nearly 33% of the park is cultivated and 80% of the hill area is under private ownership. In addition to the natural attractions, the park also features an 18th-century manor and ruins of a 14th-century castle. Accessible by road, bicycle tracks and hiking trails, there are a number of designated parking areas throughout the park area.

Mols Bjerge National Park has a rolling and widely varying topography of woodlands and open countryside, created at the end of the last ice age. Elevation in the park area varies, rising to a maximum of 137 metres (449 ft) in Mols Hills, with many types of habitats such as heath, forests, pastures, bogs, meadows, a variety of coastal habitats and sea.

== Attractions ==
Some of the attractions in the park are the forest areas of Skovbjerg, Strandkær, the ruins of Kalø Castle, Ørnbjerg water mill, Jernhatten, Ahl Plantation, Bjørnkær-Egedal Forest, and the Kalø woodlands.

As standing witnesses to the ancient Stone Age human habitation of the area, granite barrows, dolmens and passage graves used for burials of chieftains, can be seen throughout the landscape. The well-preserved burial mound of Stabelhøje (lit: Stack-hills), dates to the Bronze Age.

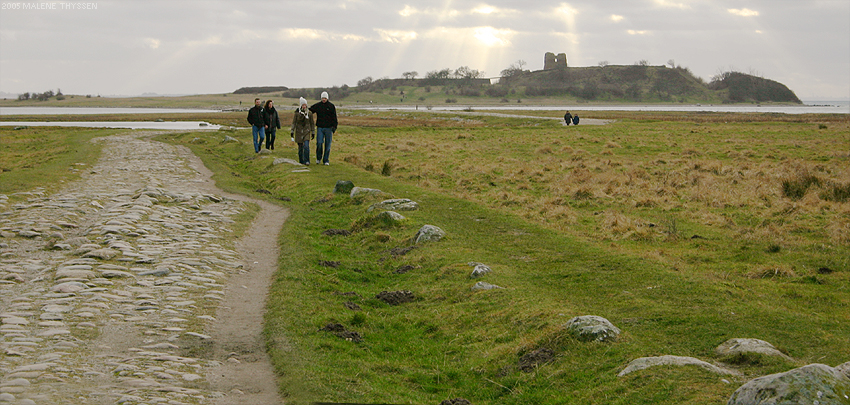
The cobbled embankment to the Kalø Castle ruins.

The castle ruins in the southwest of the park area, are the remains of the old and once important Kalø Castle. It is situated strategically on the small island of Kalø and the route to the castle ruins includes a 500 metres (1,600 ft) stretch of medieval road on a cobblestone embankment. The marina of Nappedam is located in the cove east of the embankment and on the shores of the mainland lie the Kalø woodlands of Hestehave and Ringelmose. Hestehave Wood presents opportunities for bird-watching and the Stone Age (Funnelbeaker culture) long barrow of Store Stenhøj. The coastal cliffs at Hestehave Wood supplied the clay for bricks, when Kalø Castle was built in the early 14th century and the forest here was probably planted later on in the 1500-1600s. Further inland, the former manor of Kalø Gods from the early 18th century and the hunting lodge of Jagslottet designed by architect Hack Kampmann in 1898 can be found. Jagtslottet was originally owned by the German Jenisch-family who used it for summer retreats. The Jenisch was well-liked in the region apparently, but after WW II German property in Denmark was confiscated in order to pay an estimated compensation claim of DK 11.6 billion. Now the secretariat of the national park takes residence at Jagtslottet, while Kalø Gods is owned by the state and holds several schools and an environmental administration. The restored, 18th-century barn of the Kalø estate, Karlsladen, now acts as a visitor centre to the Kalø ruins.

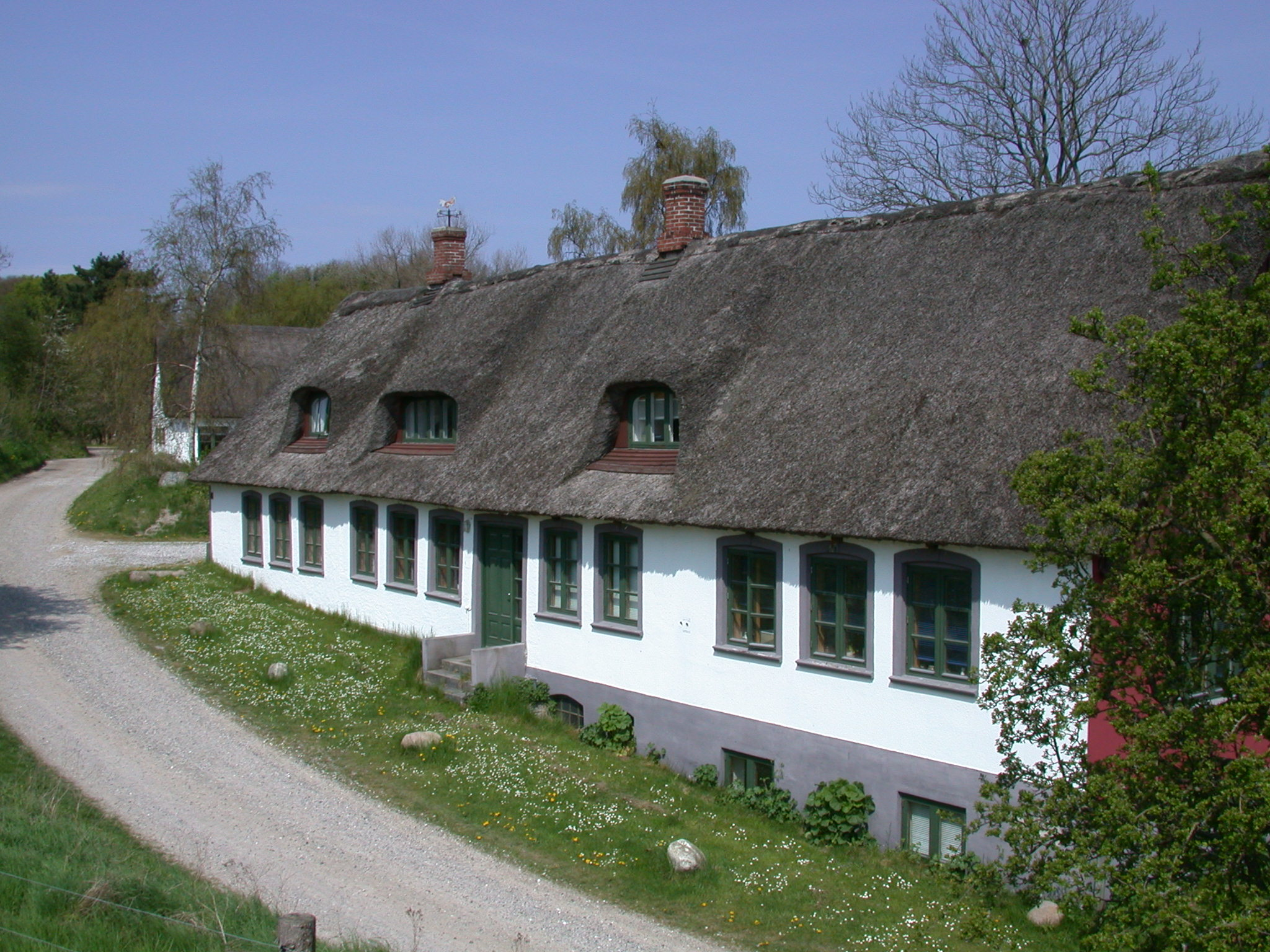
Nedre Strandkær. The visitor centre in the middle of Mols Bjerge National Park.

The old farm of Strandkær in the middle of the park comprise the houses of Øvre and Nedre Strandkær (Upper and Lower Strandkær). Nedre Strandkær was built around 1730. The farmhouse now house the research activities on the national park and also functions as a training center for nature guides. Øvre Strandkær holds the Visitor Centre of the Danish Forest and Nature Agency. A trekking path leads from Strandkær through forests of pinewood and deciduous trees and across old grasslands pastures with grazing cattle.

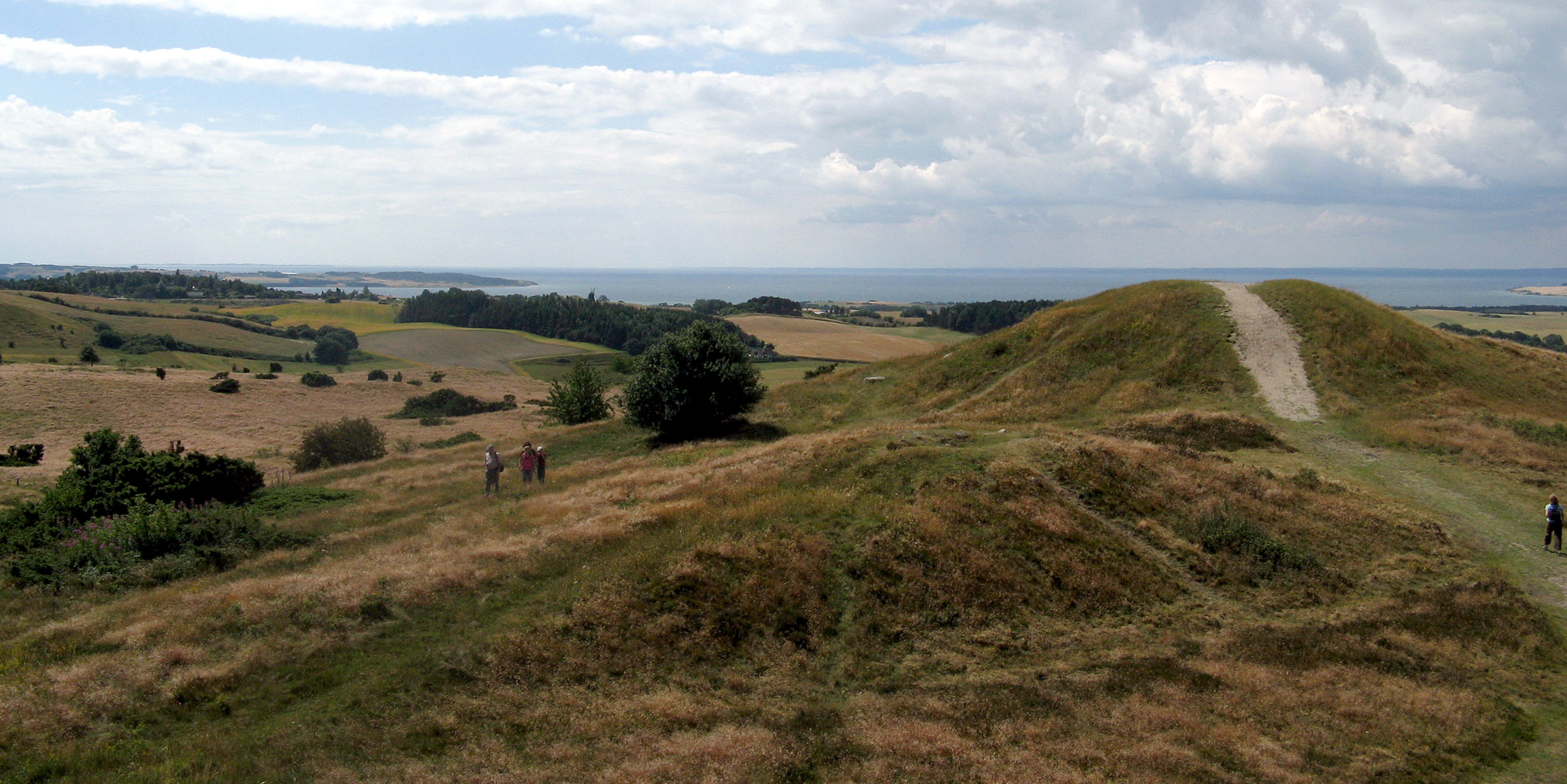
Vista from the tumulis of Trehøje.

The protected landscape south and east of the Strandkær visitor centre has a high concentration of tumuli. The open heath and grassland together with the many hill tops, offers grand vistas of the entire region. Patches of woodland grows here and there, most of them young plantations, but the deciduous wood of Skovbjerg presents one of the few remnants of the ancient forest in the national park. Further south lies the cove of Begtrup Vig and the peninsula of Helgenæs. Begtrup vig is a protected Natura 2000 area, but visitors are welcome and the shallow cove offers good and safe opportunities for snorkeling and windsurfing. Helgenæs is not part of the national park.

Mols used to house several water mills. The village of Femmøller (lit.: Five-mills) a few kilometres north of Strandkær, sprawled around a total of five water mills. None of the mills are left today, but the millponds and the timber-framed houses of the old village can still be experienced. Nowadays Ørnbjerg Mølle further east, is the only functioning water mill in the park area. Located to the south of Feldballe and enclosed within a forested area, it is run by a group of volunteers. The current timber-framed buildings date to 1833, but there has been a mill here since the 16th century. It works as a grain mill, powered by the Ulstrup Stream. The path to the mill follows the valley to Stubbe Lake, the largest lake in Djursland.

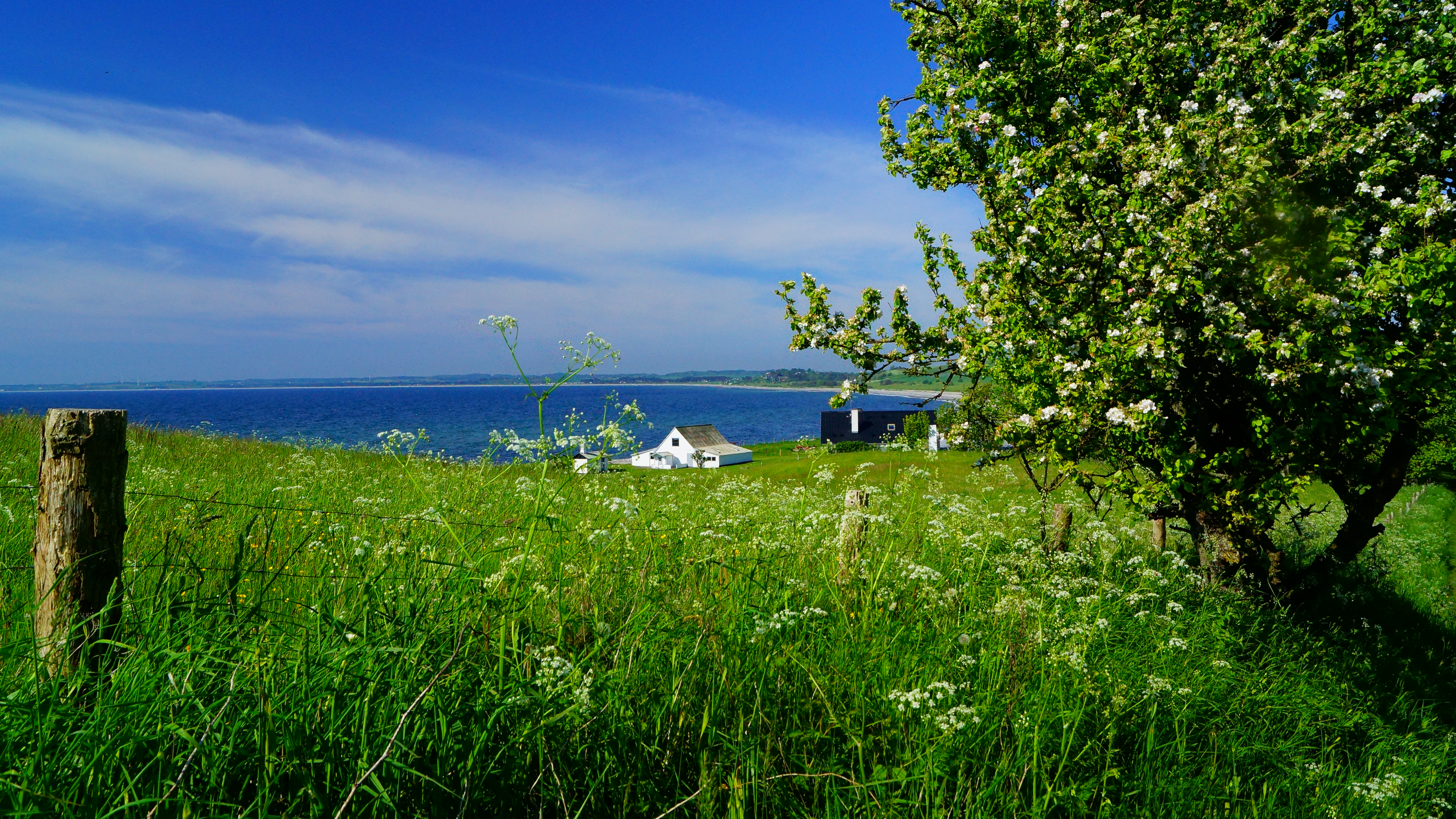
From the trail at Jernhatten.

Jernhatten (English: The Iron Hat) is a view point on the coast of the Kattegat sea, in the eastern parts of the park. The cliff above the sea has a drop of 49 metres (161 ft). The formation is very hard and not erodible by sea waves. From the car parking area, the site is approached along a track passing through the beechwood of Troldeskoven (English: The Troll Forest). The hill offers panoramic views of the surrounding area and across the Kattegat sea with the small island of Hjelm in the southeast. The path to Jernhatten leads onwards to the hills of Hyllested Bjerge, the forest of Bagskoven and down to the beach. The seafloor along the coast here, comprise a cold water stony reef with an extensive kelp forest known as the Blak, offering good snorkeling opportunities in the summer months. Harbour porpoises may be visible as well.

The woodlands of Bjørnkær-Egedal Forest and Ahl Plantation are both situated near Ebeltoft. Just south of Ebeltoft is also the small woodland of Tolløkke Wood. It is the only remaining patch of old forest on the entire Ebeltoft-peninsula and presents many large and old trees. Deciduous trees such as beech, oak, ash, black alder and willow dominate and the forest floor is covered with plants that can only thrive in ancient woodlands, such as the white-flowered Wood Anemone, the purple Early Dog-violet or the yellow Lesser celandine. Many trees are covered with the non-parasitic common ivy and cavity nesting birds like great spotted woodpecker thrives here. Tolløkke Wood has been in possession of the citizens of Ebeltoft for centuries and it used to house summertime celebrations at Skovpavillionen - a dance pavilion in the midst of the forest.

Bjørnkær-Egedal Forest was previously an important oak forest owned by the Crown, but it was deforested for firewood to produce salt during the wars of the 1660s and 1670s with Sweden. The forest was replanted in 1940-45 during the German occupation of World War II, as a labour project for the unemployed. Now species of conifer dominate, but various deciduous trees are mixed in, such as beech. Bjørnkær-Egedal Wood is situated just east of Ebeltoft in the hilly terrain of Skelhøje, offering scenic views of the landscape of this region.

Ahl Plantation is a coastal forest planted in the later part of the 19th century on a large depositional protrusion southwest of Ebeltoft and comprise both salt marsh and woodland. The sturdy mountain pine dominate the 110 ha forest, but oak and birch is mixed in. Green woodpecker is common here, indulging in the many ant-heaps of the forest. The northward shores are very shallow and attracts flocks of foraging gulls and wading birds such as lapwing, curlew, oystercatcher and ringed plover. Some of the trenches and bunkers built here during the war of 1801–1814 against England, can still be seen today. Similar constructions exists at Ebeltoft, Havmøllen at Jernhatten, Randers and Stavns Fjord on the island of Samsø.

=== Gallery ===
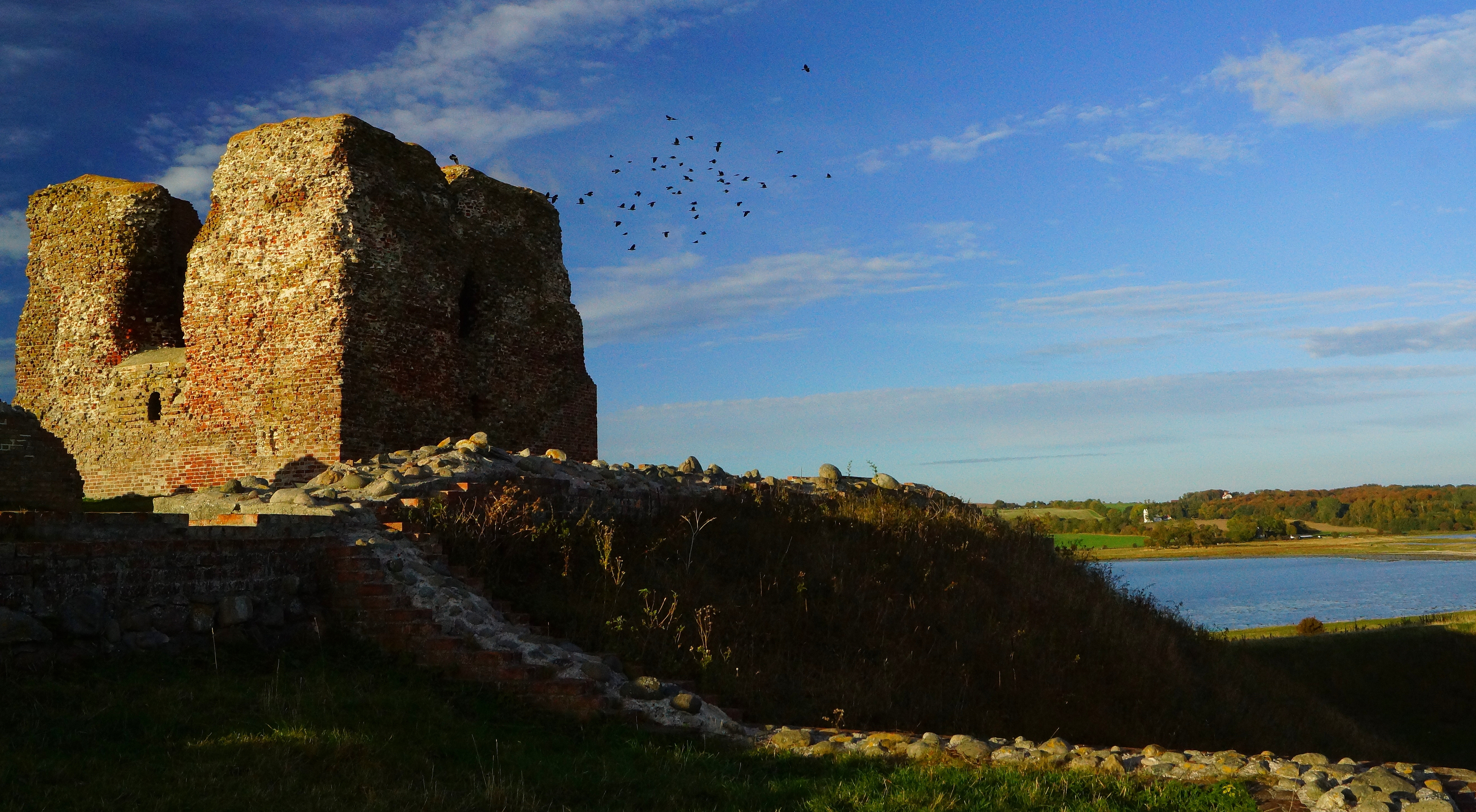
Kalø Castle Ruin

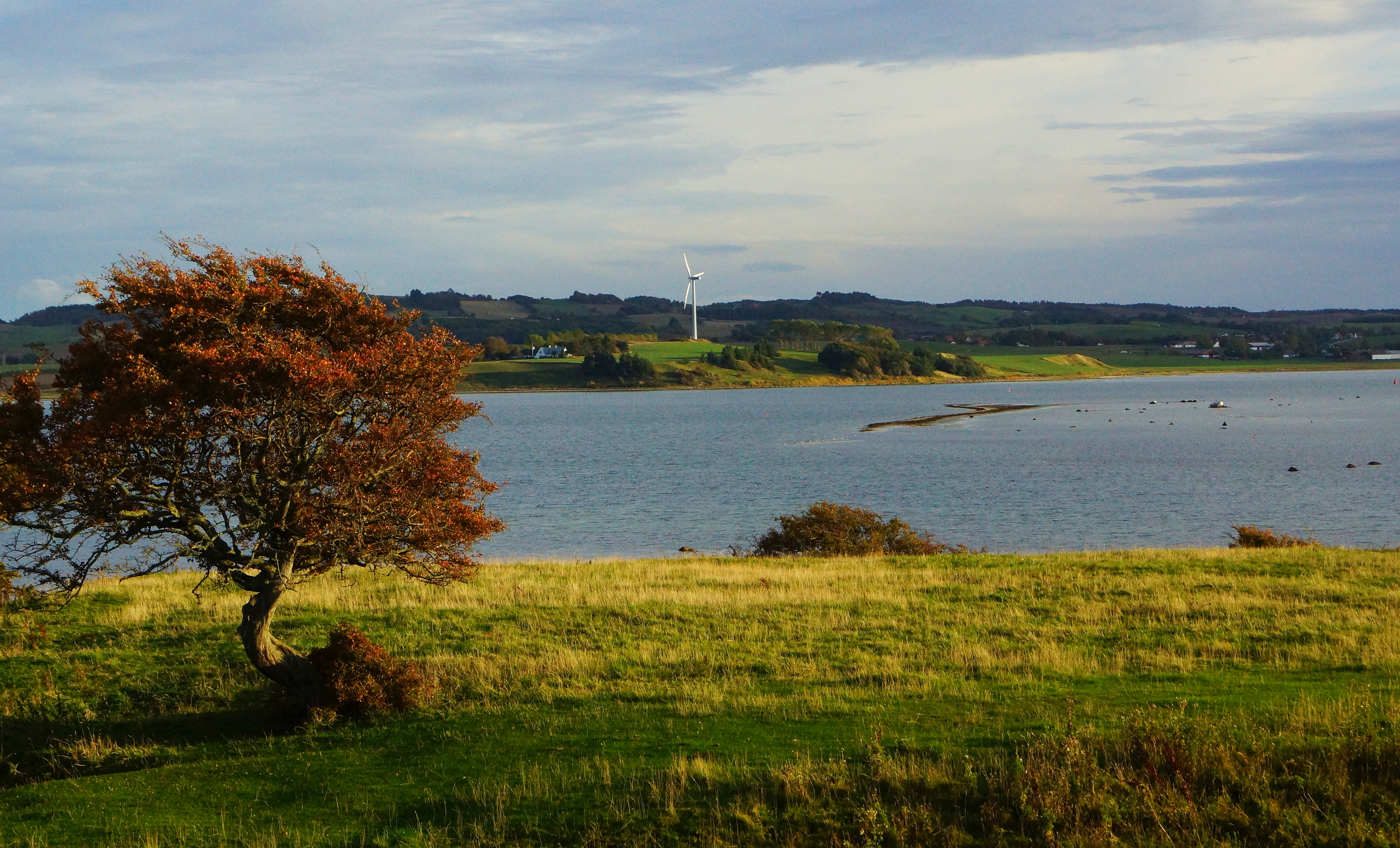
Bight of Egens

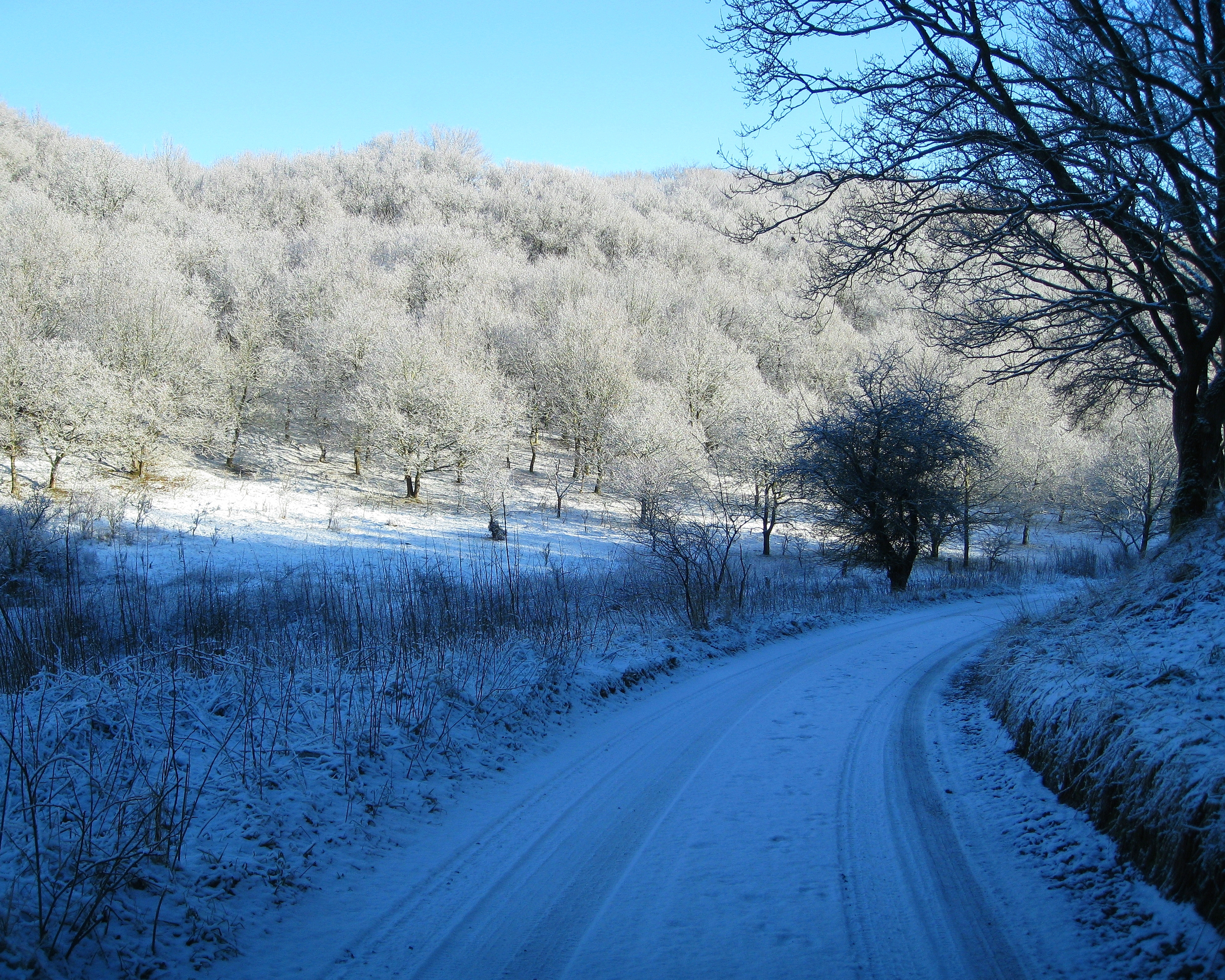
Hills of Mols

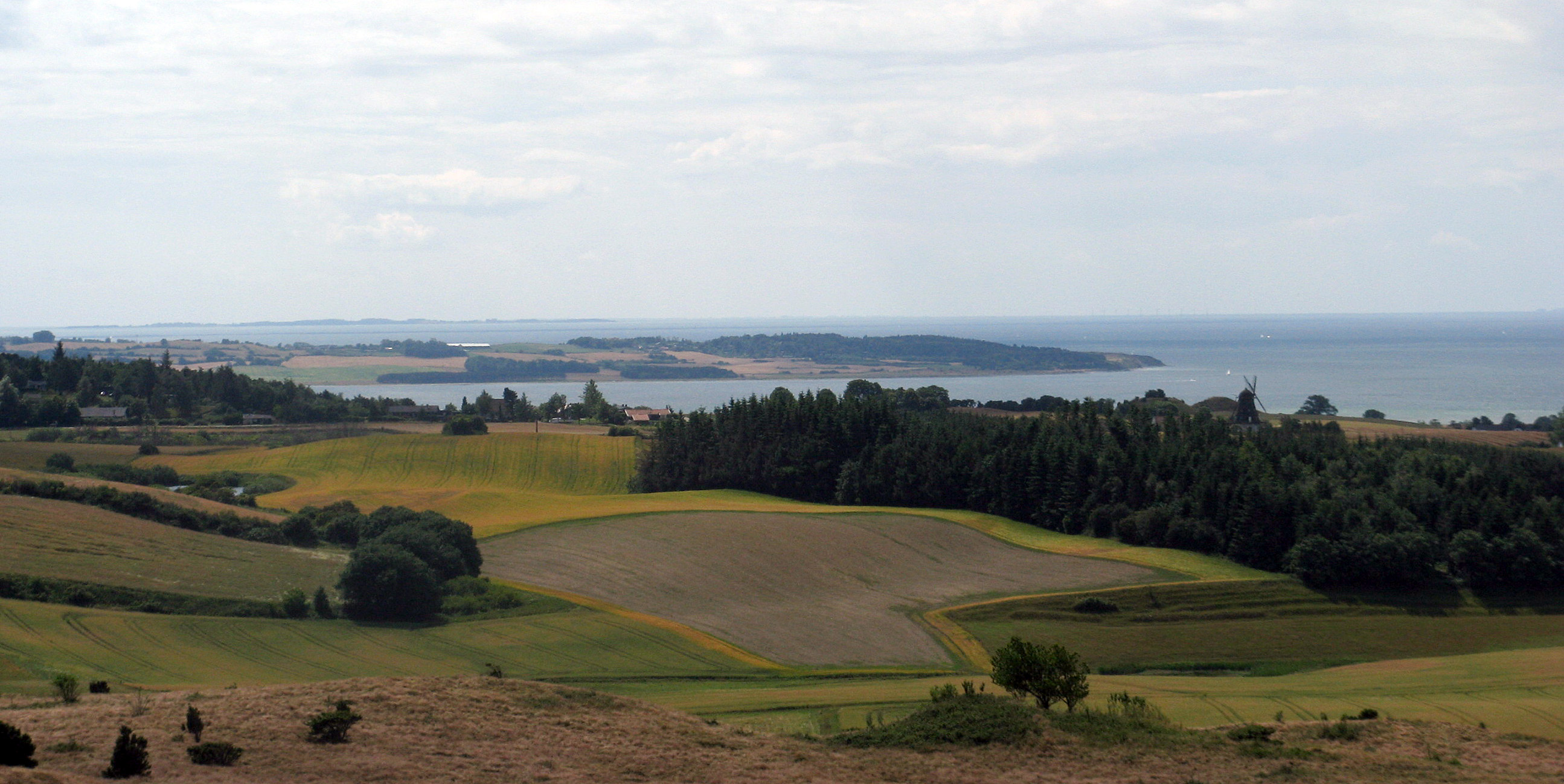
Begtrup Cove and the peninsula of Helgenæs

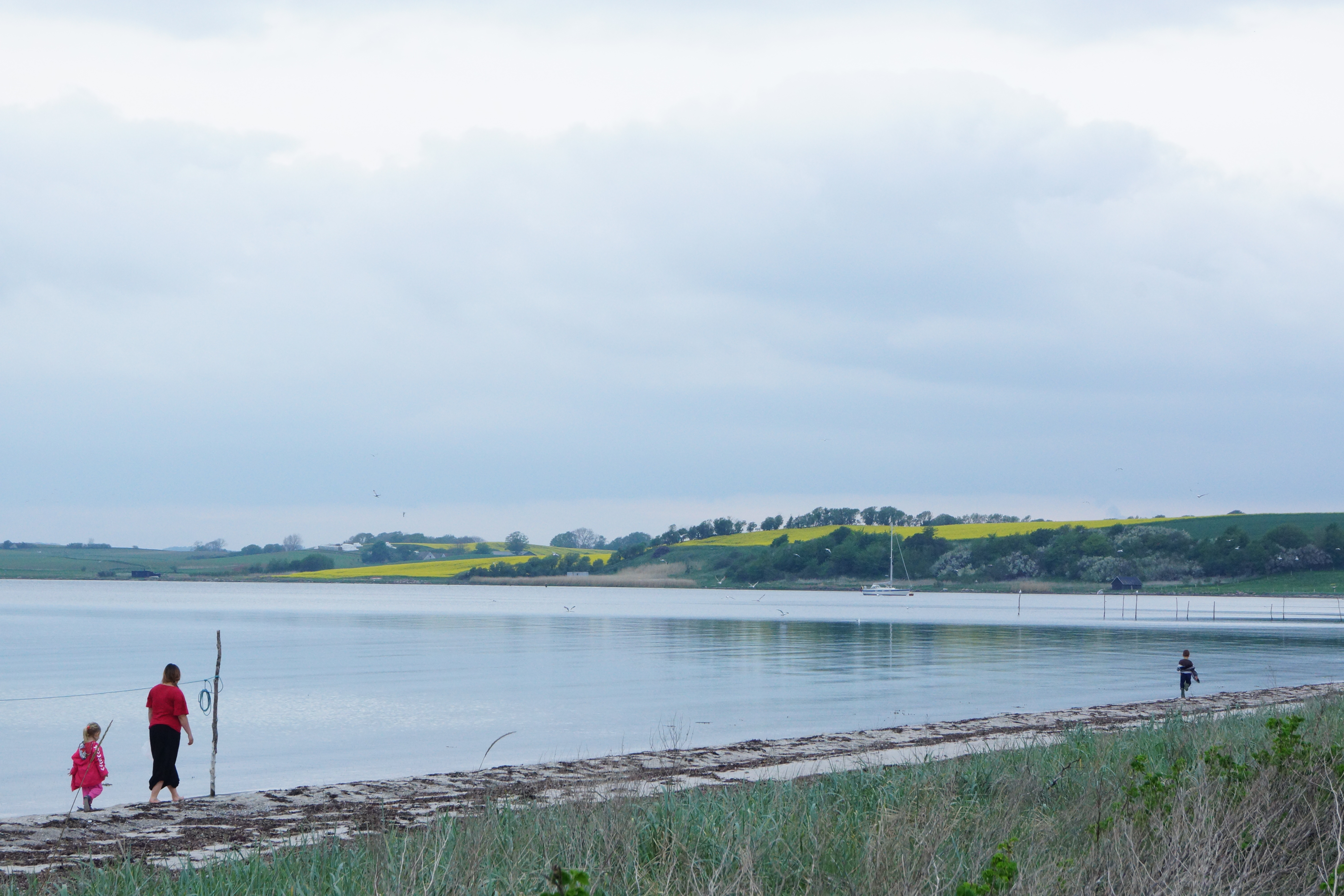
Bight of Begtrup.

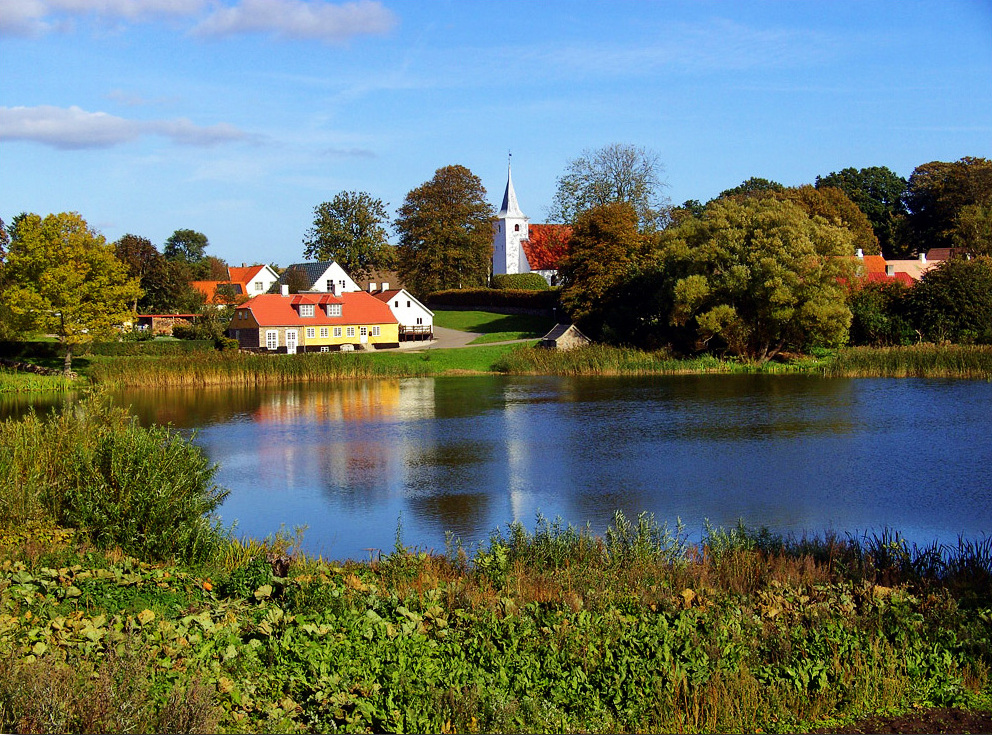
The village of Agri

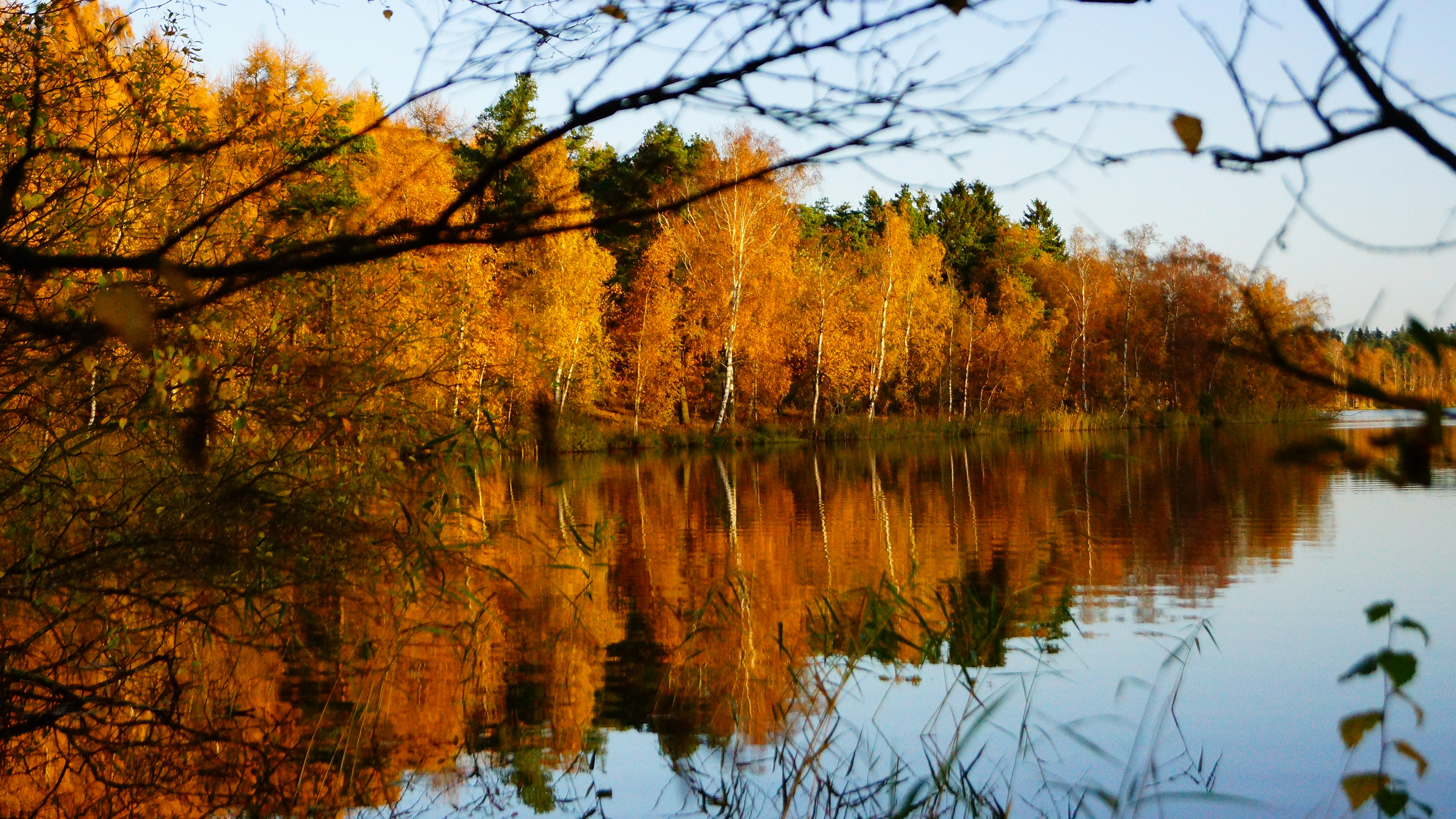
Øjesø (lit: Eye-lake) a forest lake.

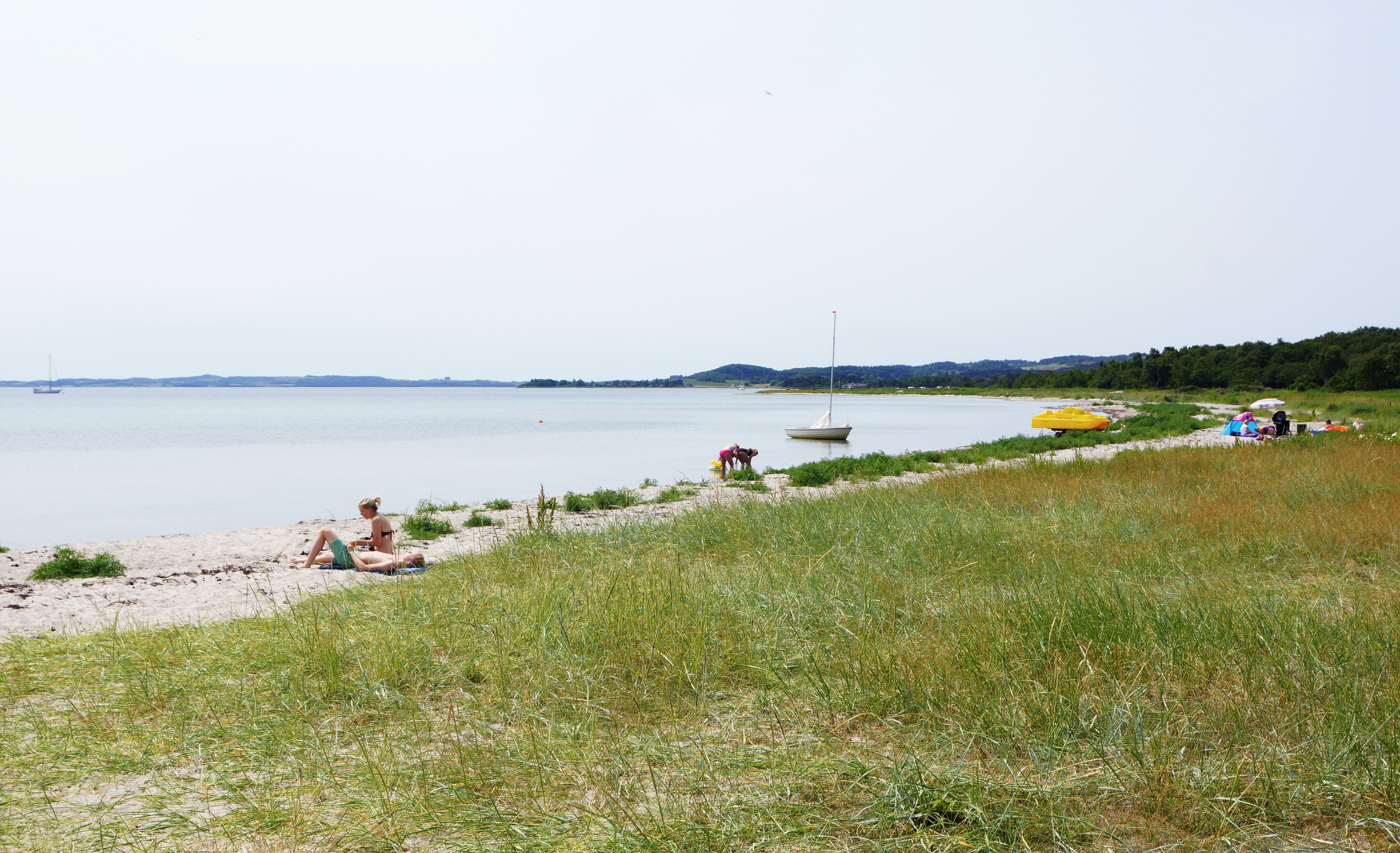
Summer at the beach of Femmøller Strand.

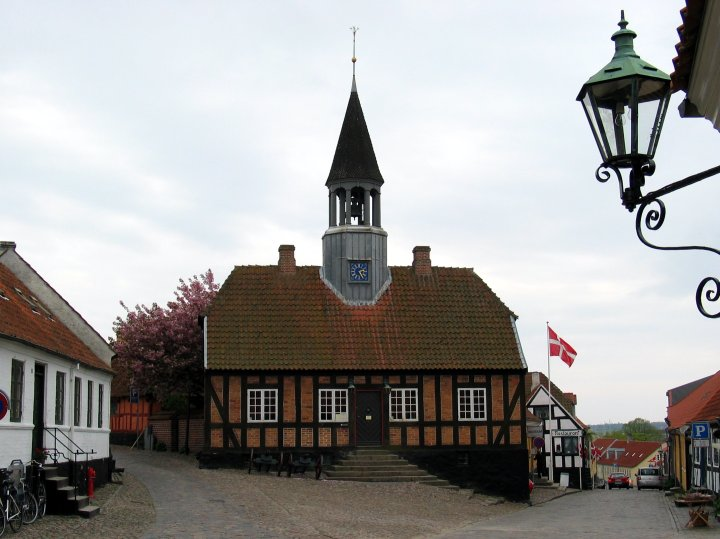
The old city hall in Ebeltoft.

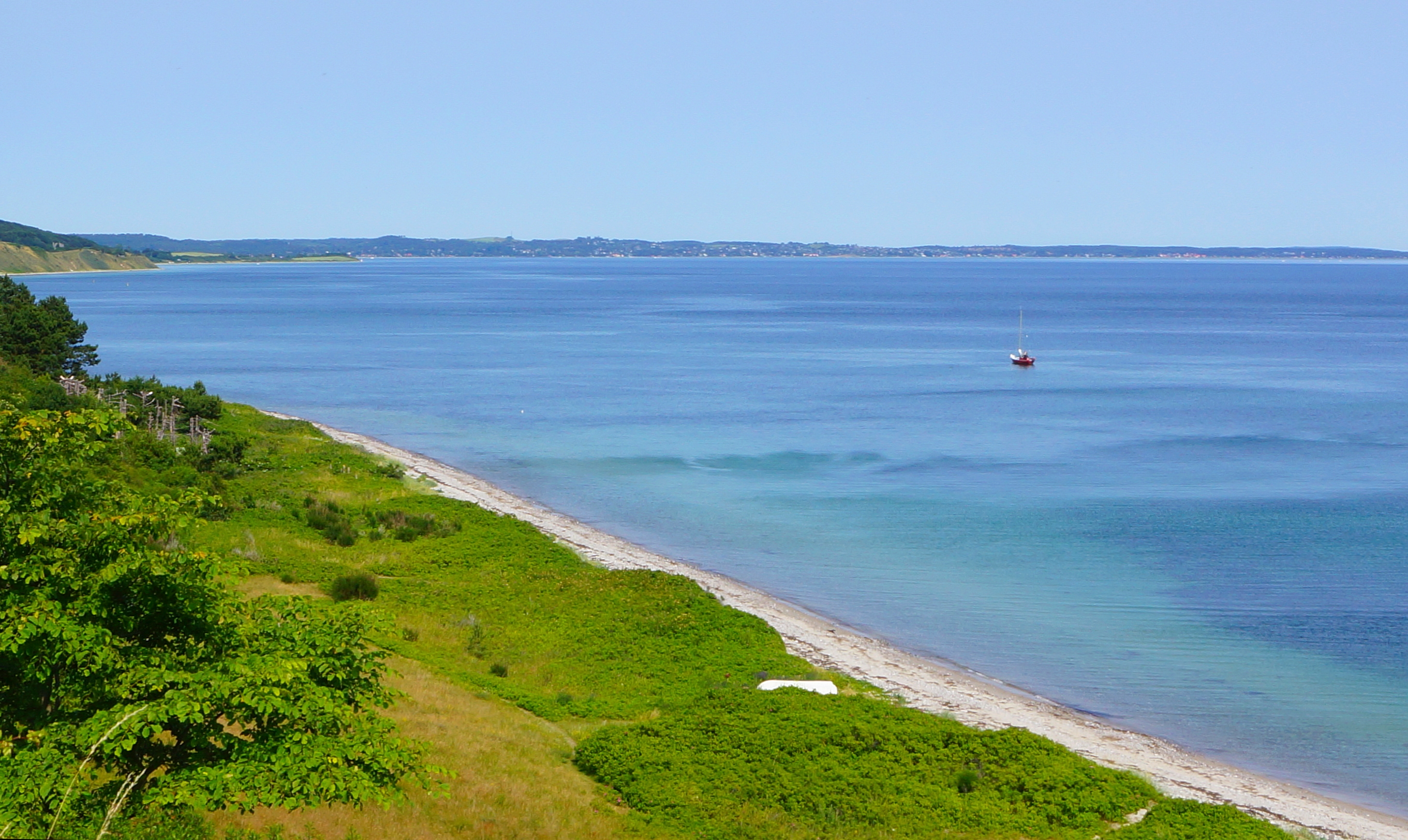
Bight of Ebeltoft

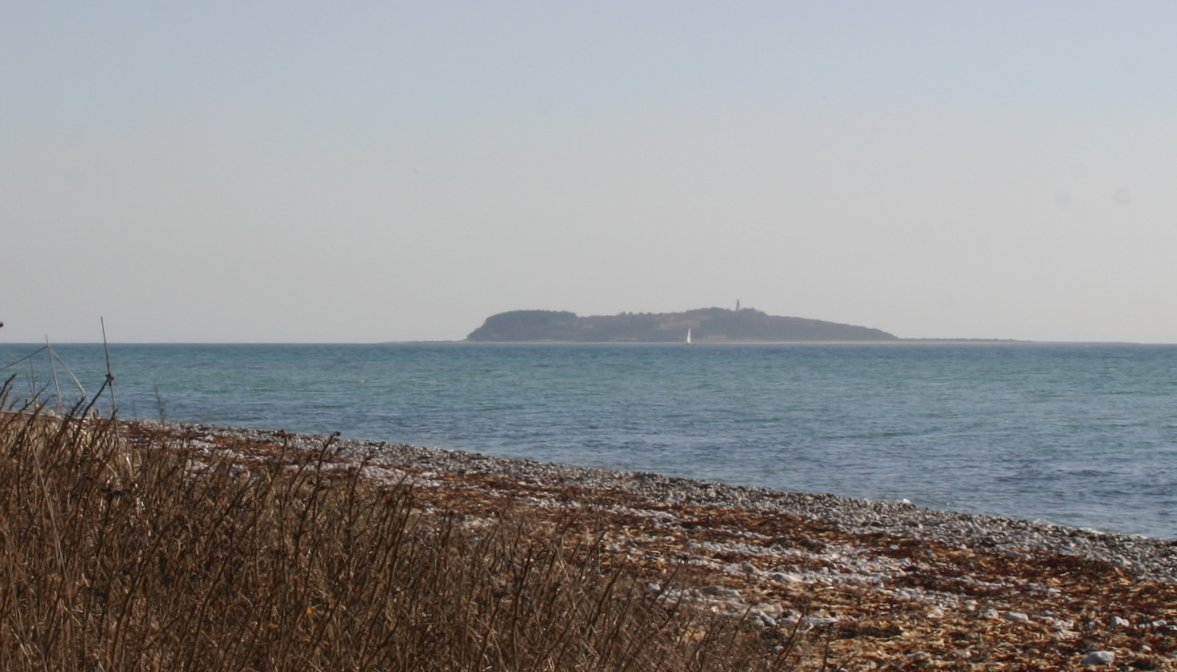
The desolate island of Hjelm

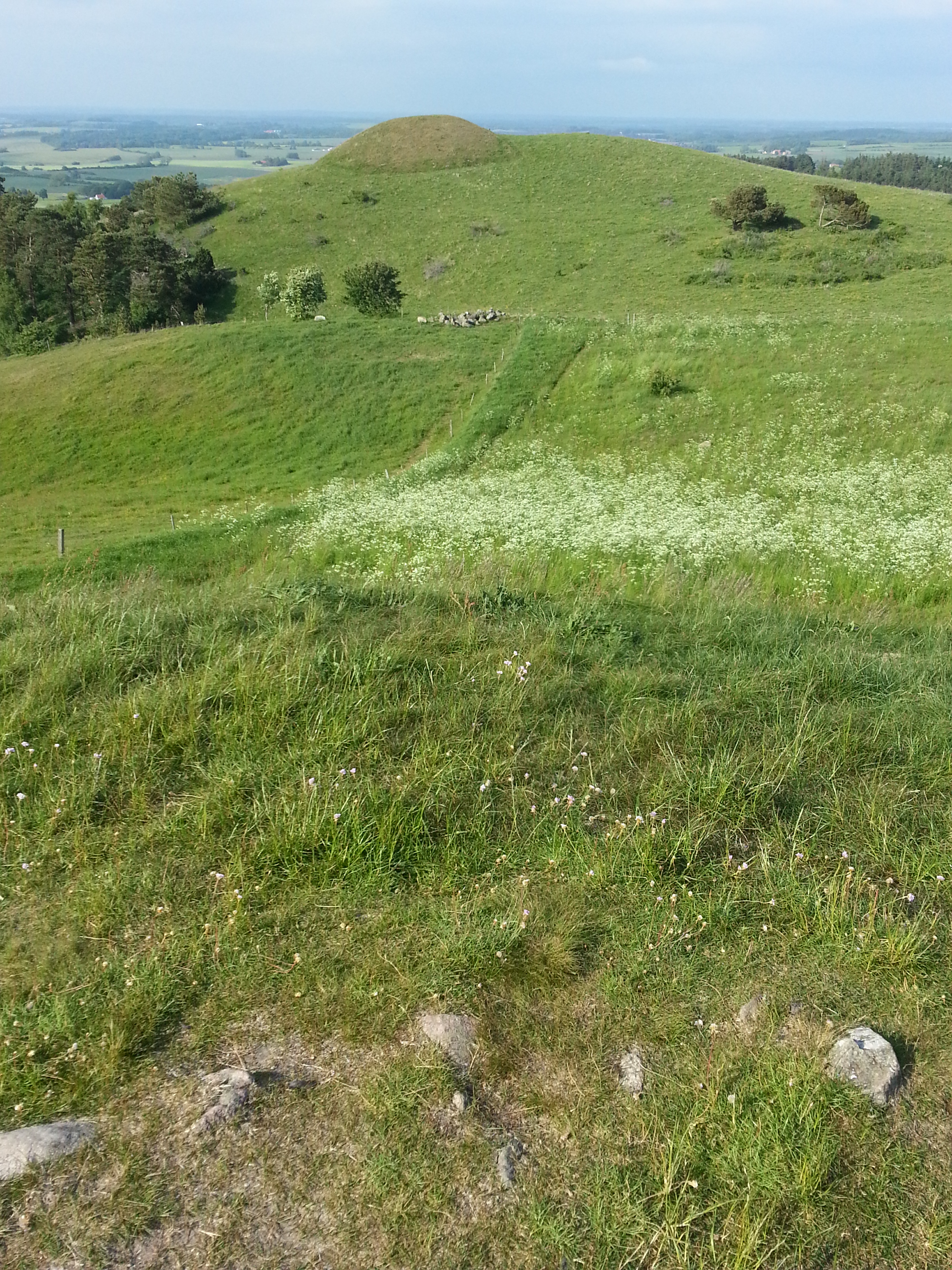
Stabelhøje view from top of southern Dolmen towards the northern Dolmen

== Flora and fauna ==
Mols Bjerge National Park contains many rare or threatened species and nature-types and a large part of the park is to be preserved as Natura 2000. One of the reasons to establish the park was to protect and collectively administer separate and fragmented areas.

Agriculture has marked the entire landscape and ecosystem of Mols very heavily for centuries and only small patches and remnants of the former ancient woodland exist nowadays. It can still be experienced here in forests like Tolløkke Skov or Skovbjerg (lit: Wood-Hill), an oak-dominated woodland. Even though Skovbjerg is an ancient woodland, the habitat has been subject to a cyclical use of “grazing and timbering” for centuries and young scrub and open grasslands are around. In recent years, an area of 15 hectares (37 acres) has been subject to beef cattle grazing to a moderate degree. In Denmark, 10% of the forest-preserved land is allowed to be used for wood pastures in order to maintain and create stable woodland ecosystems. The forest habitat of Skovbjerg consists of old acidophilous woodland of pedunculate oak (Quercus robur), characterized by a low diversity of vascular plants, but many different epiphytic lichens. Roe deer are the only larger grazing animal observed here. It has a population density of 20 deer per km^{2}.

Important wildlife flora in the national park includes plants such as the pasque flower, catchfly, and cudweed. Threatened nature habitats like beach meadows, coastal heath and salt marshes holds important flora and fauna to be protected. A large number of rare and threatened fungi species has been found in Mols Bjerge National Park, some of them nowhere else in the country.

The mammals in the park include red fox, hare, roe deer, alongside reptiles like the viviparous lizard and the European adder. There are rich and varied populations of birds in the park area, ranging from sea birds, waders, forest birds, cavity nesting birds to birds of prey at the top of the food chain.

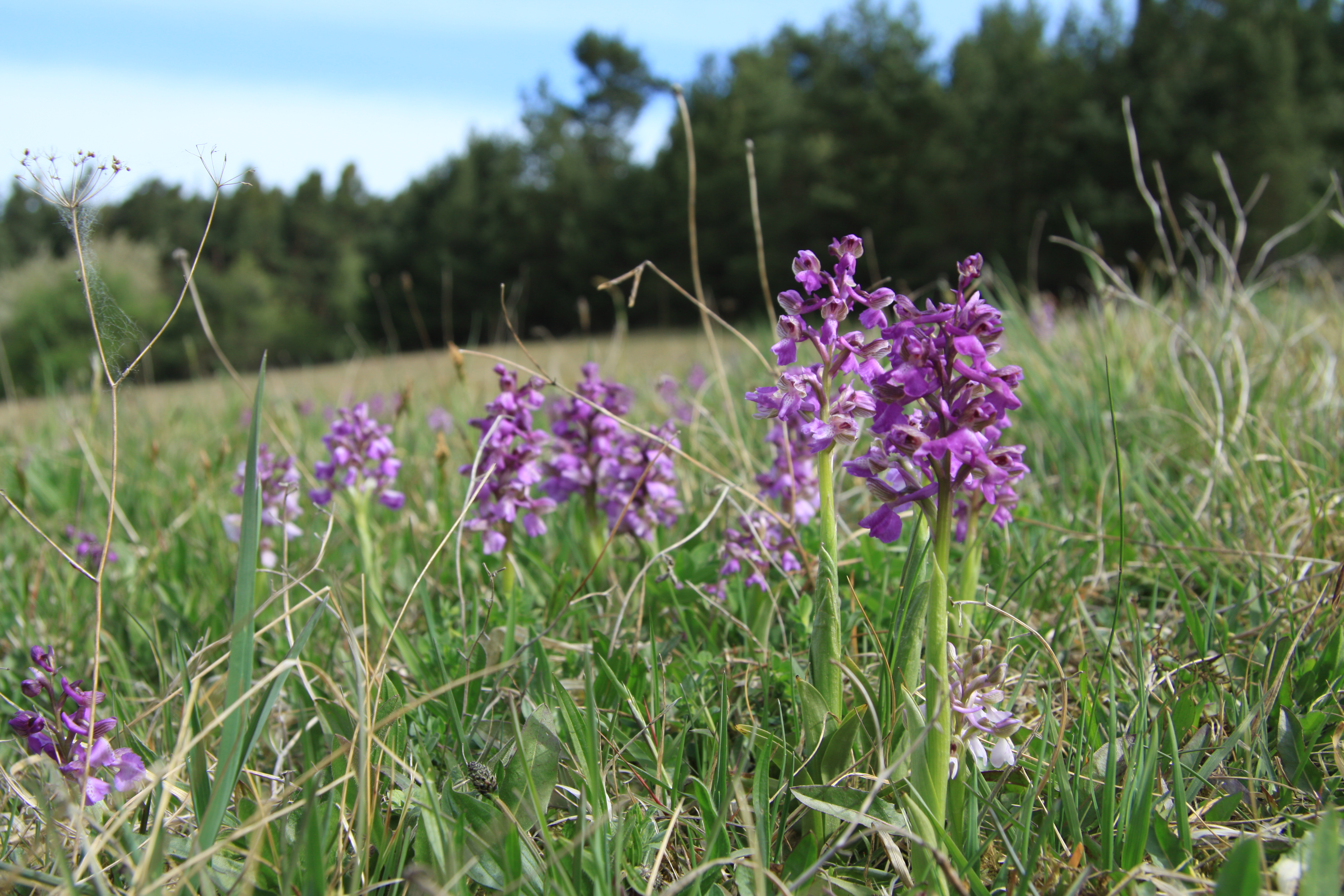
Green-winged orchid.

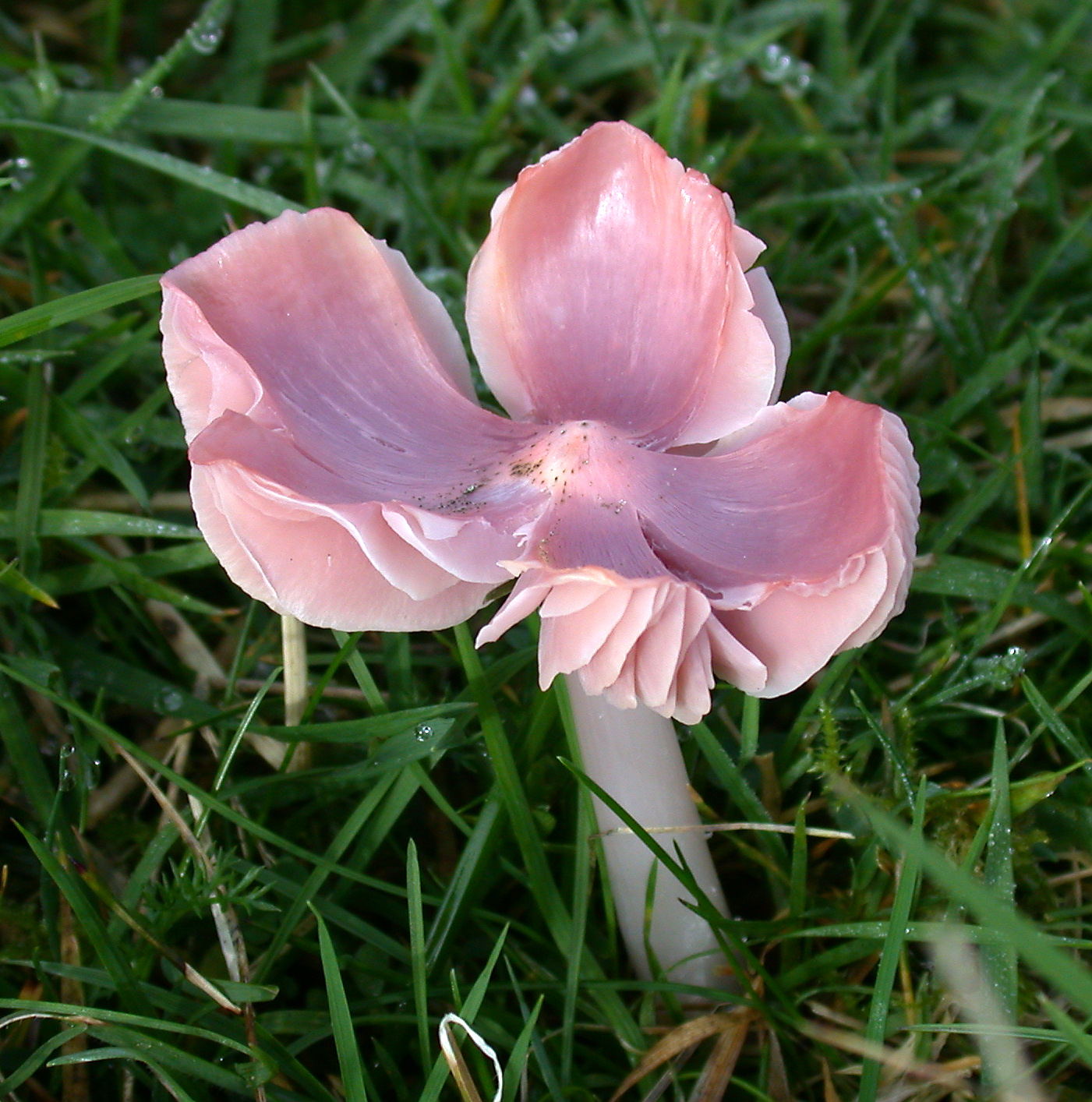
Pink waxcap.

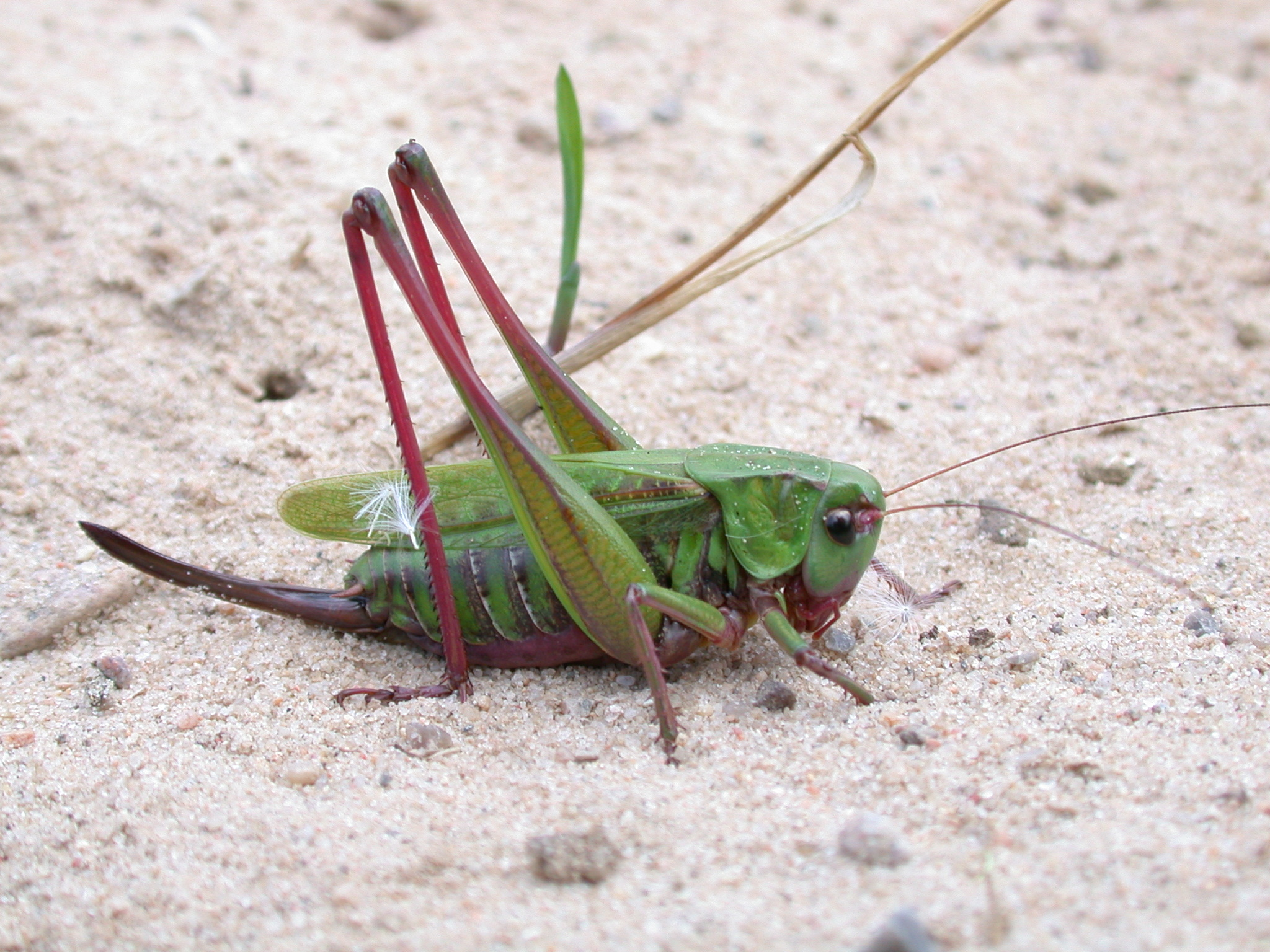
Wart-biter.

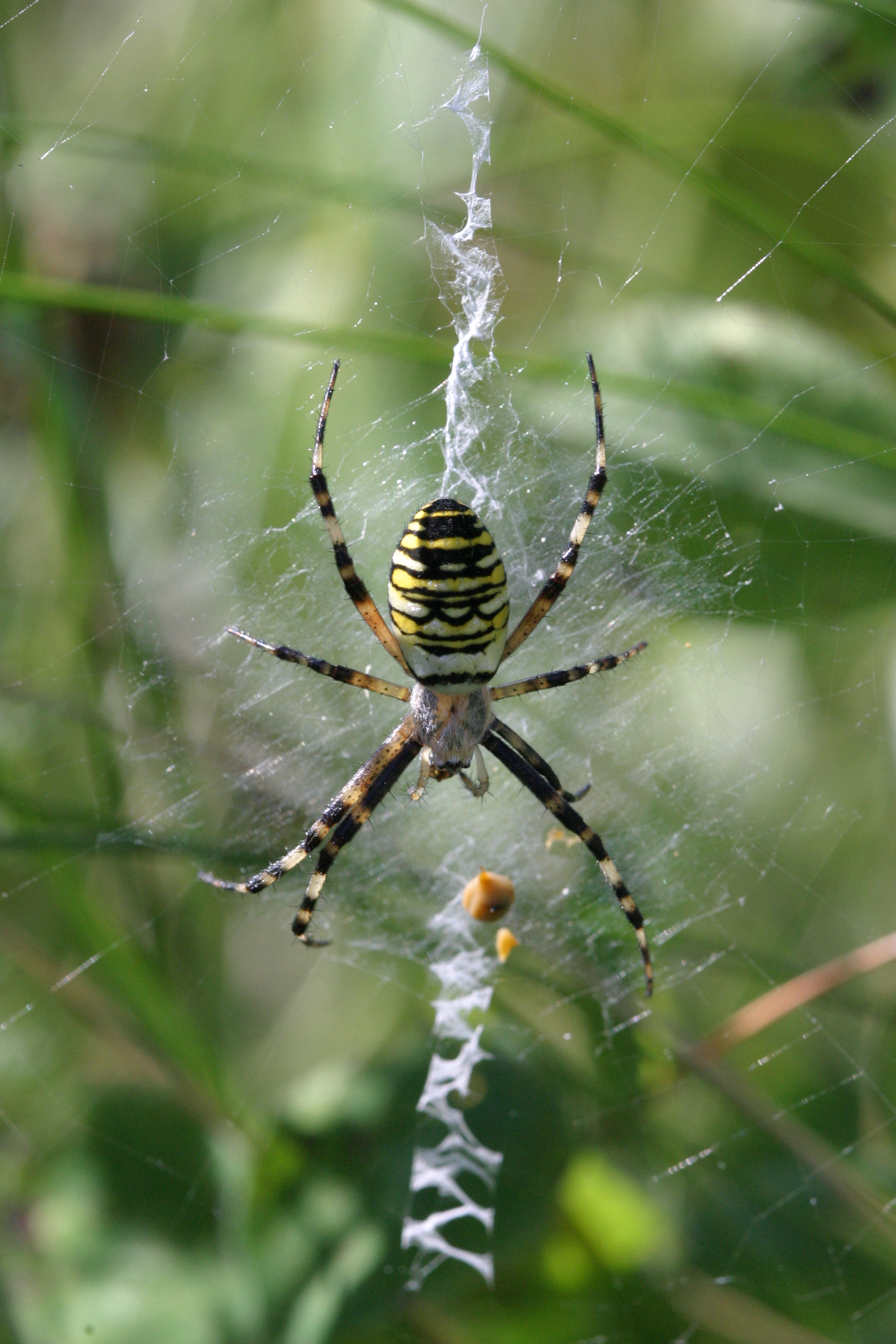
Wasp spider.

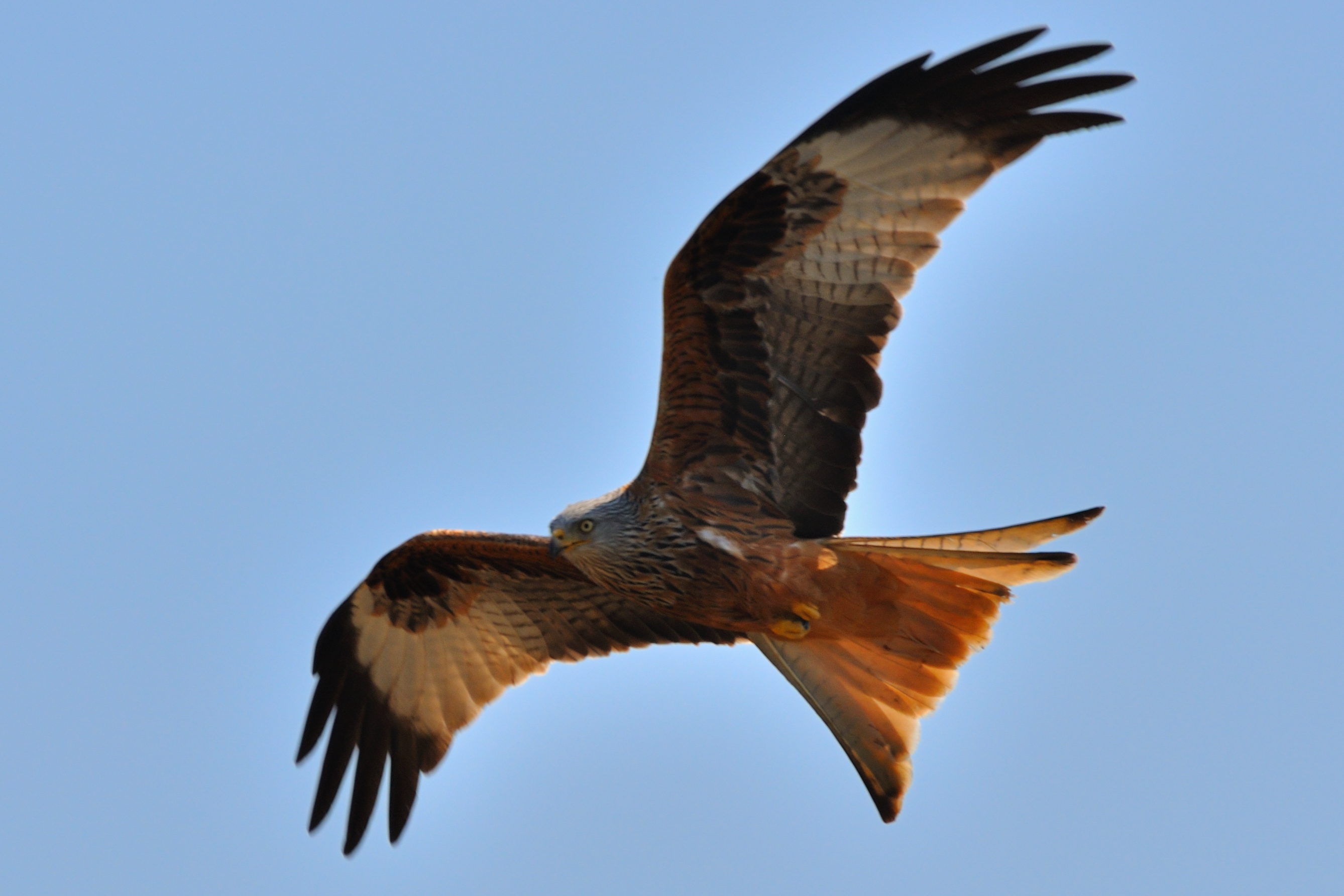
Red kite.

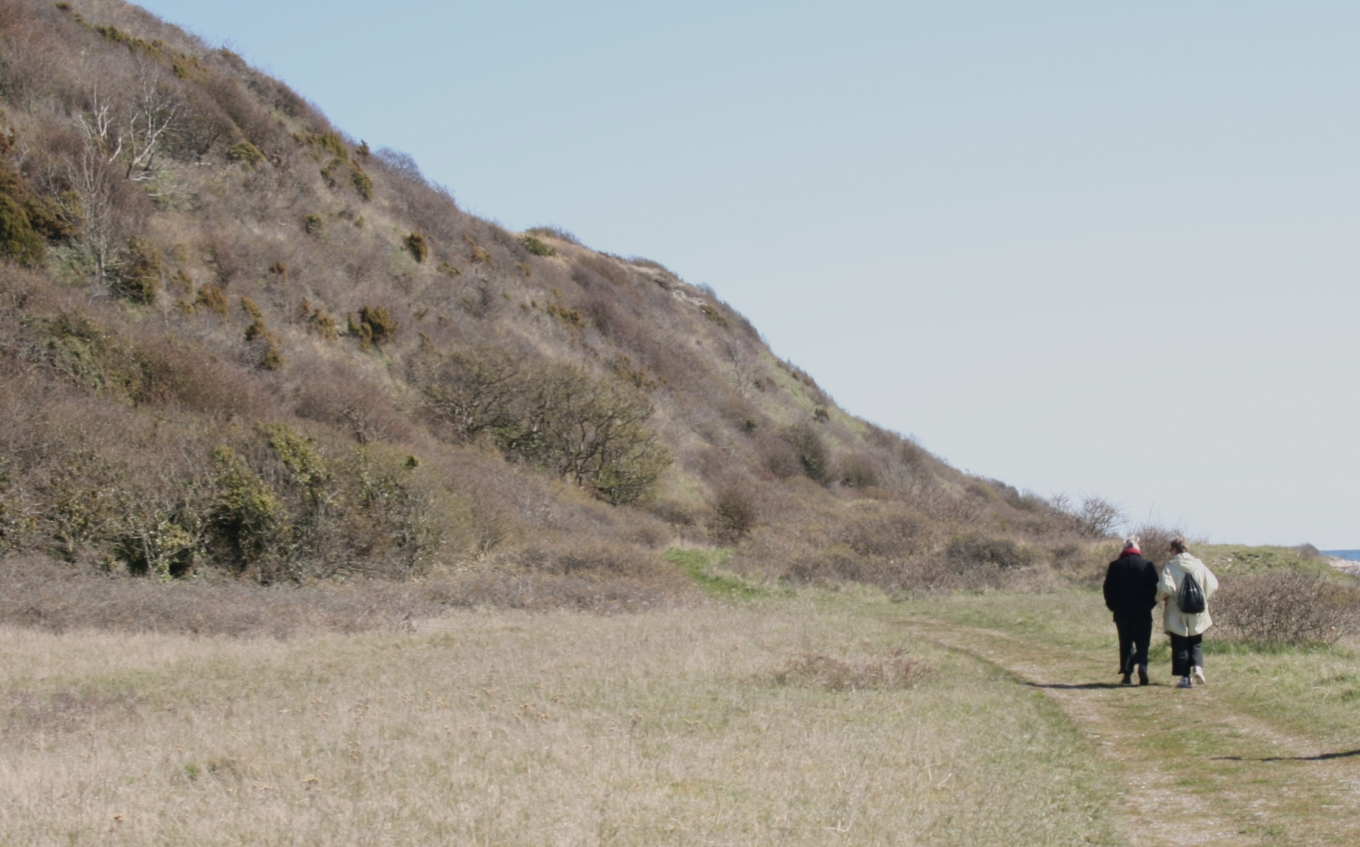
Jernhatten has a special steppe-like ecology.

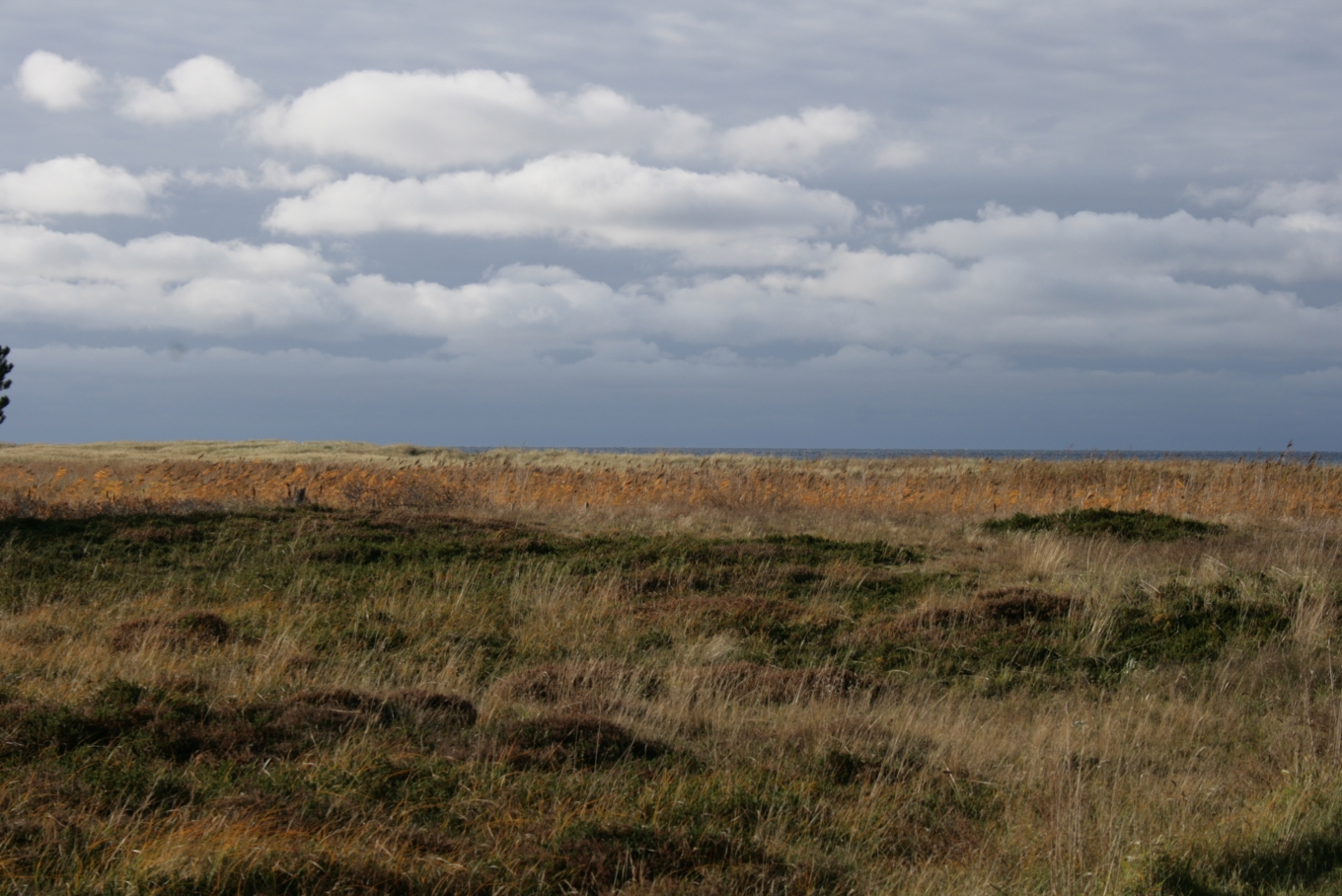
Coastal heath at Øer.

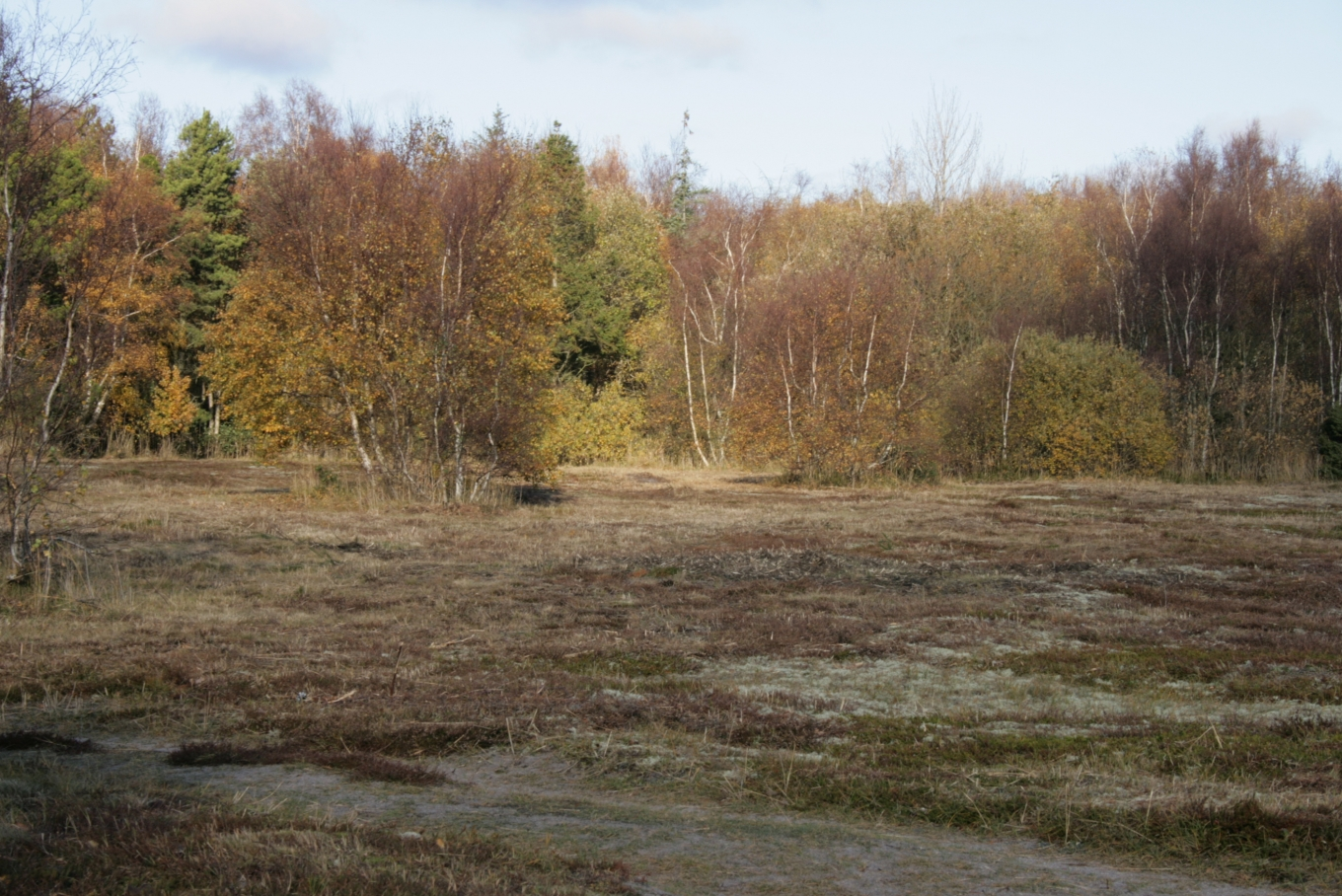
Spontaneous pine and birch vegetations.

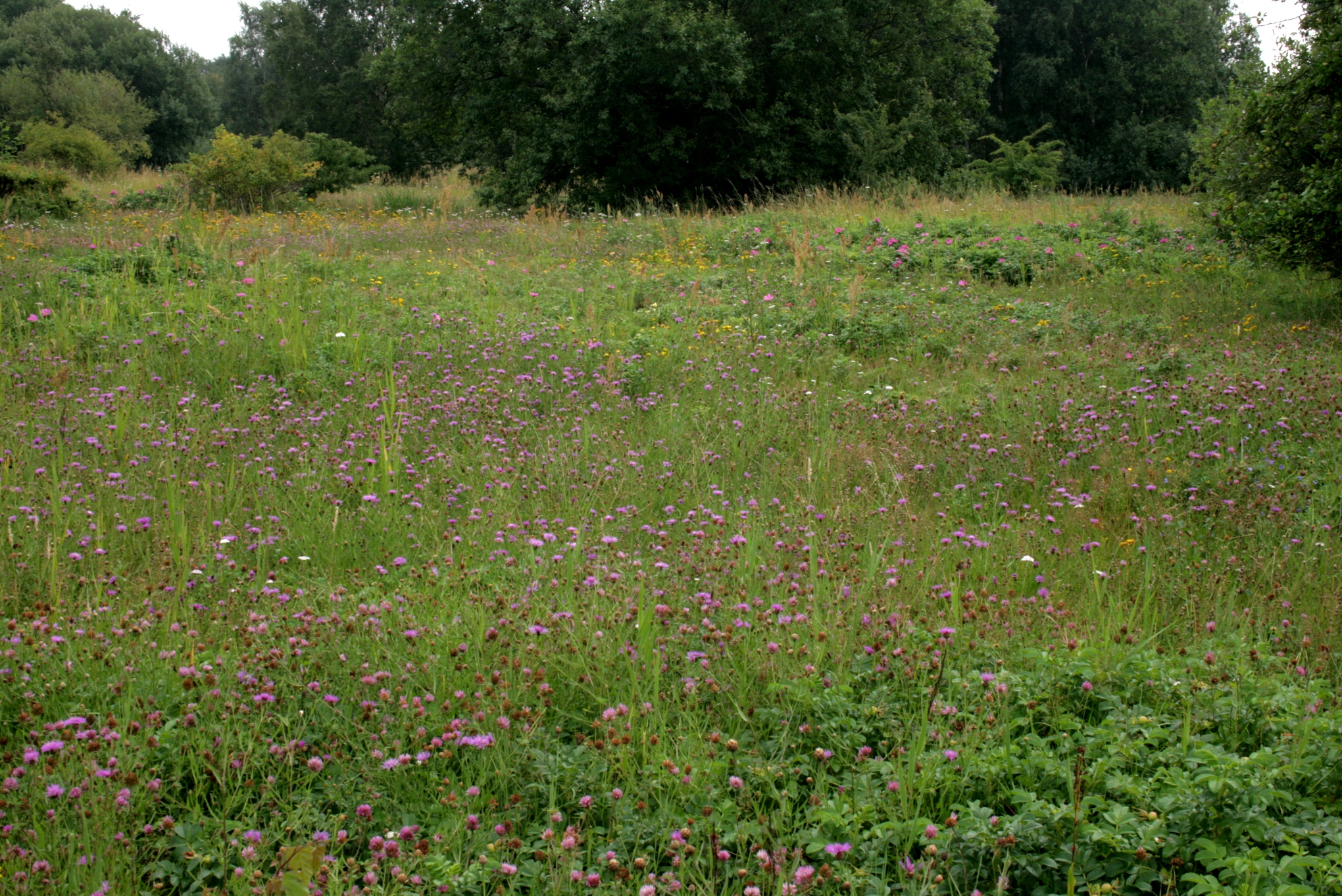
Meadows

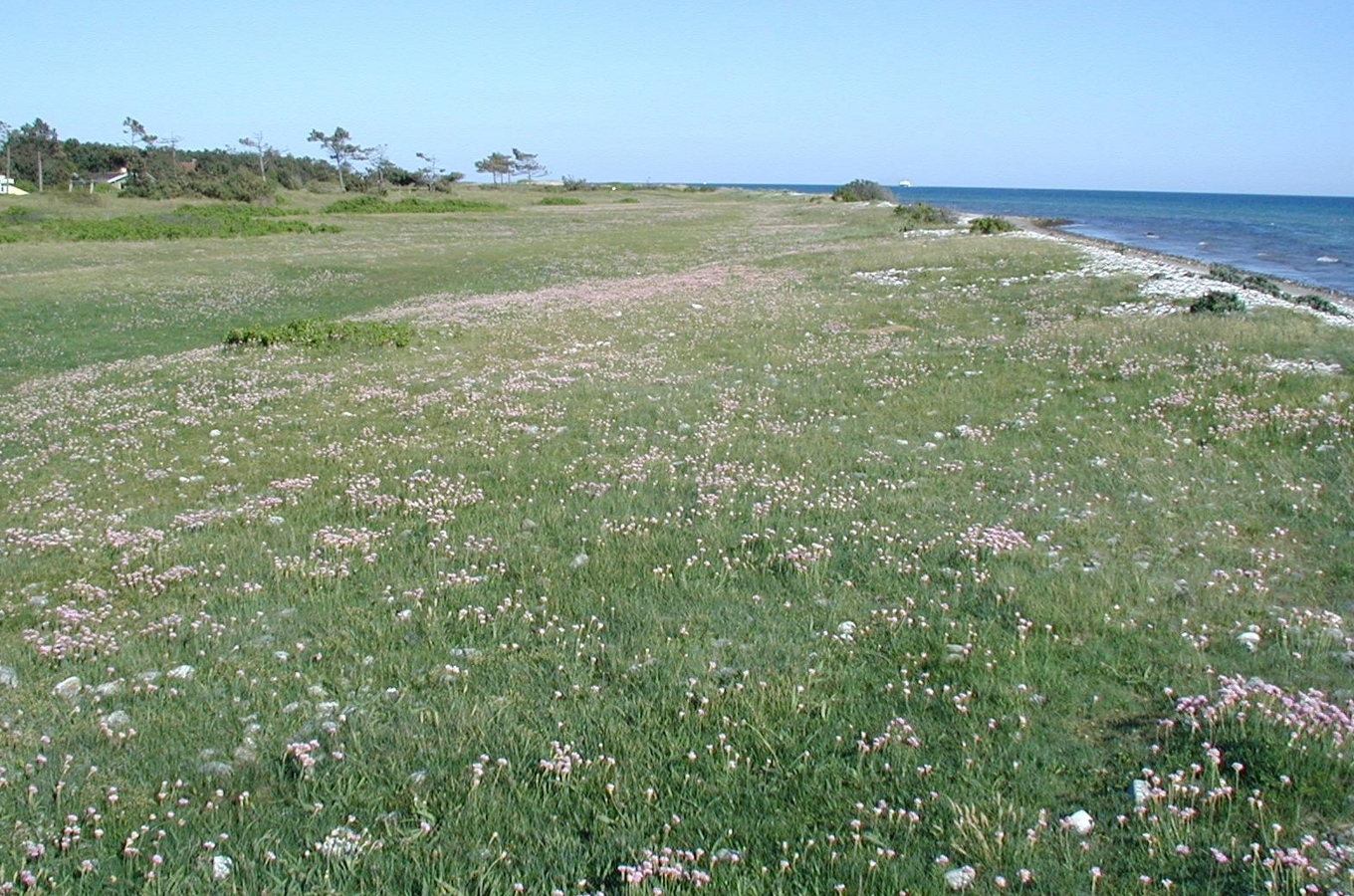
The beach meadows near Ebeltoft.

== See also ==
- List of national parks of Denmark
- Pardosa danica, a spider only known from a single specimen found in Mols Bjerge in 1883

== Sources and references ==
Bibliography

- Berezin, Henrik (2006). Adventure Guide Scandinavia. Hunter Publishing, Inc. ISBN 978-1-58843-579-8.
- Fauchald, Ole Kristian; Hunter, David; Xi, Wang (7 January 2011). Yearbook of International Environmental Law 2009. Oxford University Press. ISBN 978-0-19-960882-9.
- Bain, Carolyn; Bonetto, Cristian; Stone, Andrew (1 June 2012). Lonely Planet Denmark. Lonely Planet. ISBN 978-1-74321-287-5.
- Rotherham, Ian D. (5 March 2013). Trees, Forested Landscapes and Grazing Animals: A European Perspective on Woodlands and Grazed Treescapes. Routledge. ISBN 978-0-415-62611-8.
