= Hjelm (island) =

Island in Denmark

Coordinates: 56°08′00″N 10°48′10″E

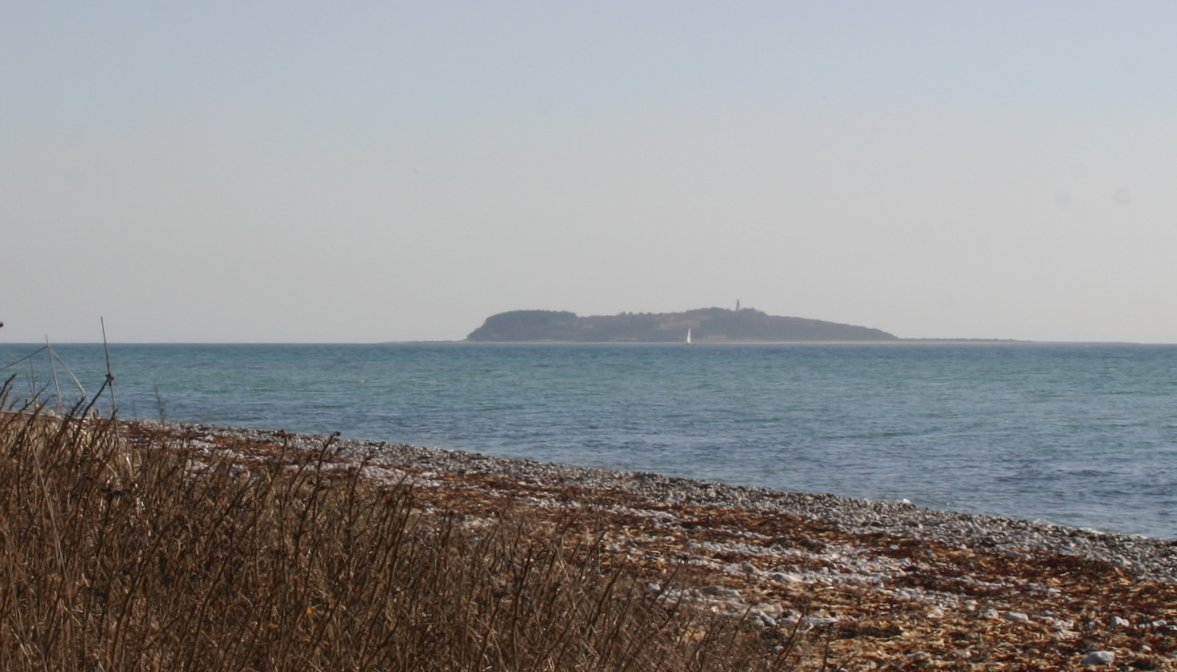
- Hjelm seen from Djursland

Geography
- Location: Kattegat
- Area: 0.62 km^{2} (0.24 sq mi)
- Highest elevation: 39 m (128 ft)
- Highest point: Fyrbakken

Administration
- Denmark

Demographics
- Population: 0
- Hjelm Lighthouse
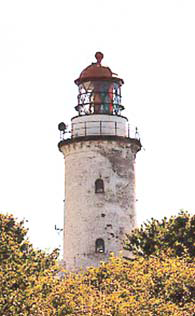
- Constructed: 1856
- Construction: brick
- Height: 18 m (59 ft)
- Shape: cylindrical tower with balcony and lantern
- Markings: White (tower), red (dome)
- Power source: solar power
- Focal height: 61 m (200 ft)
- Range: 14 nmi (26 km; 16 mi) (white), 11 nmi (20 km; 13 mi) (red, green)
- Characteristic: Iso WRG 8s
- Denmark no.: DFL-1900

Hjelm is a small uninhabited Danish island located in the Kattegat 10 km (6 mi) south-east from Ebeltoft.

In 2009, the island was included in Mols Bjerge National Park. The island is privately owned.

The name Hjelm literally translates to Helmet in English. The island has also been referred to as Helm in English.

== History ==
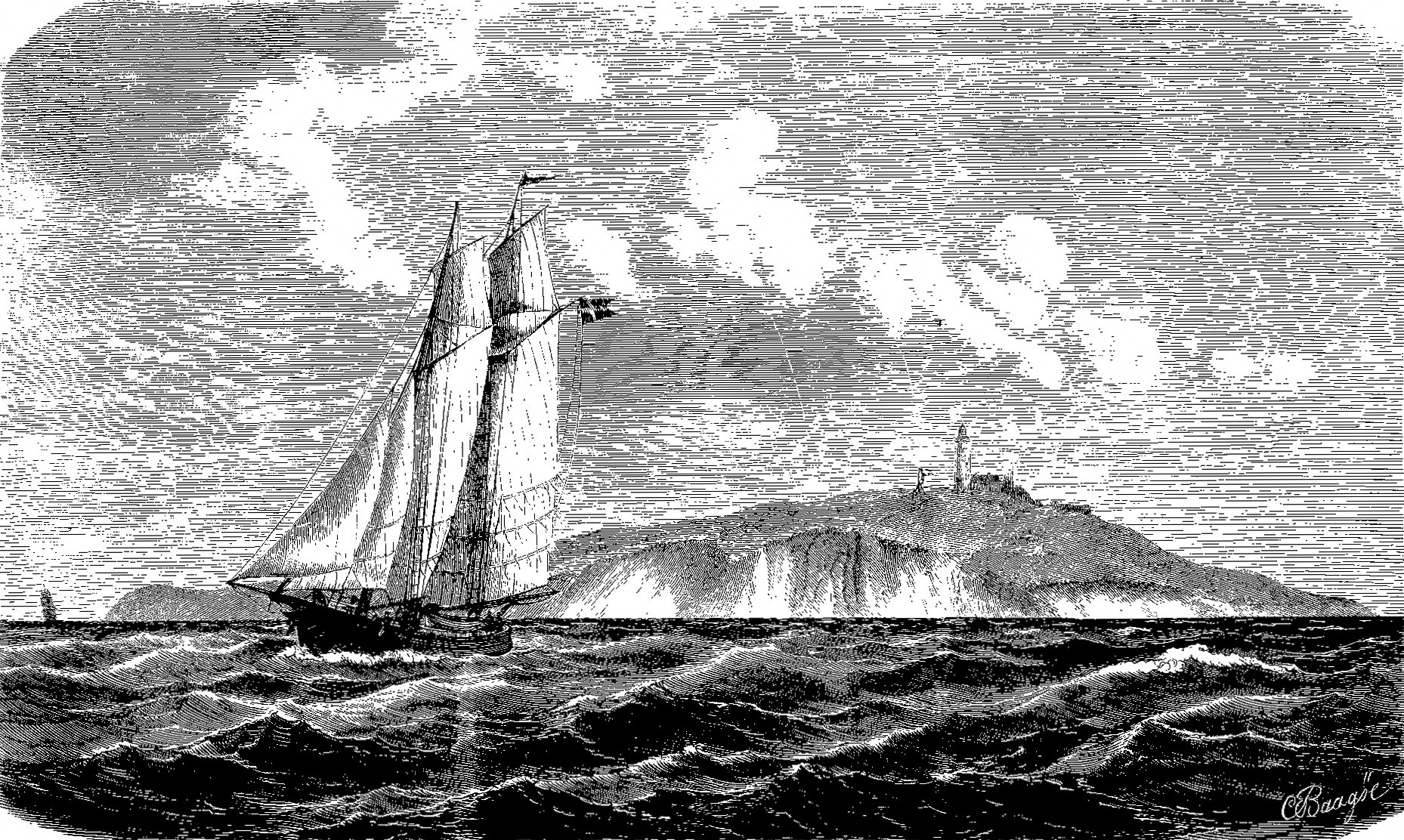
Old picture of Hjelm

There has been found evidence of human activity on Hjelm, as early as the Stone Ages, but it first entered Denmark's history in 1287, when the outlawed Marsk Stig fled to this barren island, after the murder of Erik Klipping the year before. The outlaw sought help and assistance from the Norwegian king Eric "Priest Hater" and he supplied them with a total of three fortresses, various fortifications, ships and troops. Recent archaeological excavations have revealed that in the year of 1289 Marsk Stig and his men attacked and demolished the royal castle of Brattingsborg on the island of Samsø, just south of Hjelm. With that neighbouring threat out of the way, the outlaws conducted piracy and counterfeiting from Hjelm until 1295. Marsk Stig died on the island in December 1293 of unknown causes, but it was not until 1306 that Erik Menved felt strong enough to take back the small island.

Today there is only an automated solar-powered lighthouse on Hjelm.

== See also ==
- List of lighthouses and lightvessels in Denmark

== Literature ==
- Pauline Asingh og Niels Engberg: "Marsk Stig og de fredløse på Hjelm" Jysk Arkæologisk Selskab (2002). ISBN 87-88415-13-9. On the recent archaeological excavations. (in Danish)
