= Karlsladen =

Visitors centre in Denmark

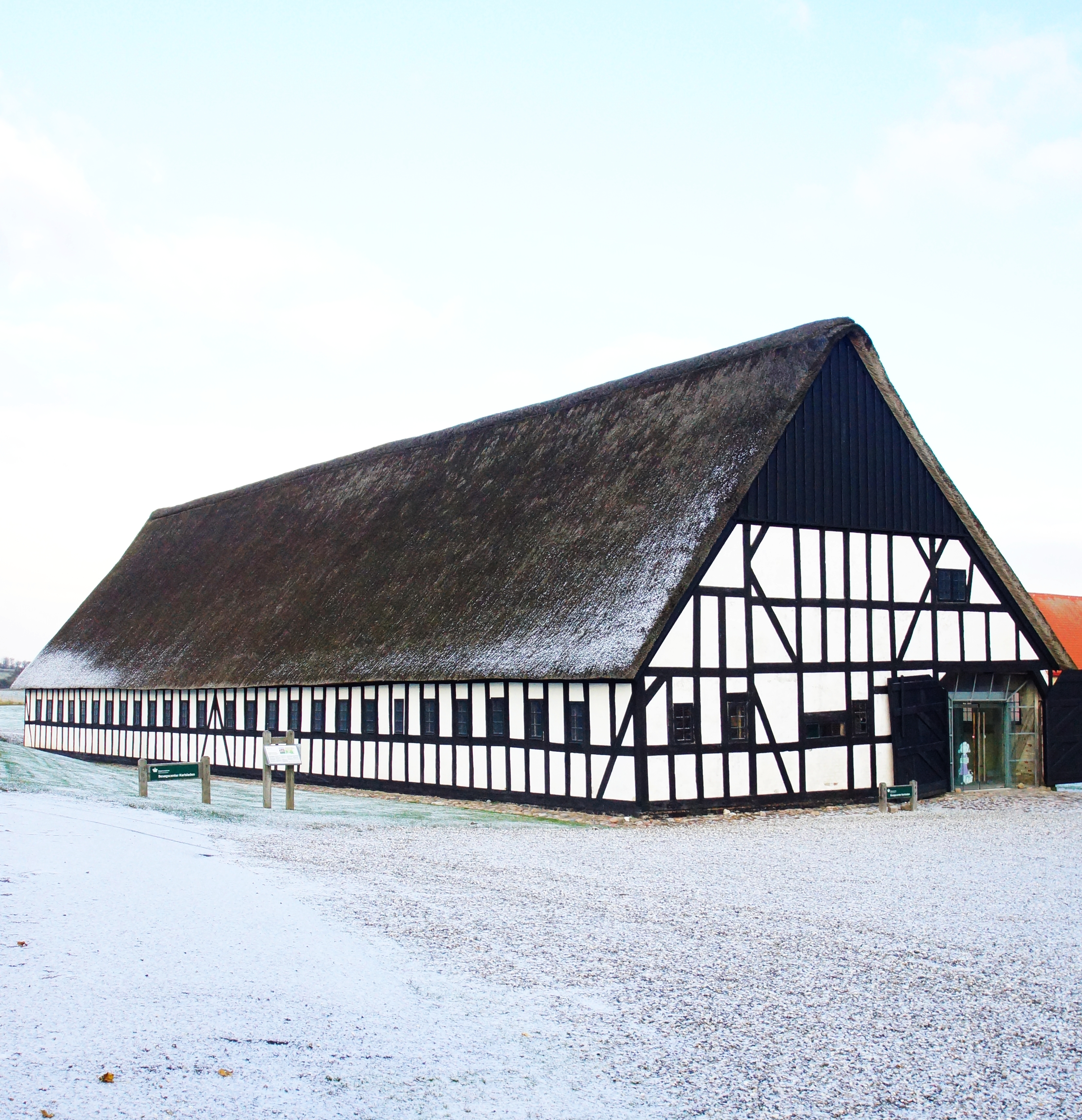
- Karlsladen in 2016

- Location within Denmark

General information
- Architectural style: Low German house
- Location: Syddjurs Municipality, Denmark
- Coordinates: 56°10′35″N 10°29′33″E
- Completed: 1727
- Owner: Skov- og Naturstyrelsen

Technical details
- Structural system: Thatched-roofed and timber-framed

Karlsladen is a historical barn and visitor centre for the Mols Bjerge National Park in Syddjurs Municipality, Denmark. It is located close to Kalø Castle Ruin and the town Rønde. The thatched and timber-framed building covers 1,000 square meters, and was originally constructed in 1727. It was extensively renovated in 2013 when it was converted into a visitor centre.

The barn was constructed in 1727 to store farm crops from the Kalø Estate. Until 1945, the Kalø Estate, was privately owned by the German Jenisch family from Holstein. After World War II, the Danish State confiscated the Kalø Estate, including Karlsladen, as part of war compensation. Today, the estate is owned by the Danish Nature Agency.

== History ==
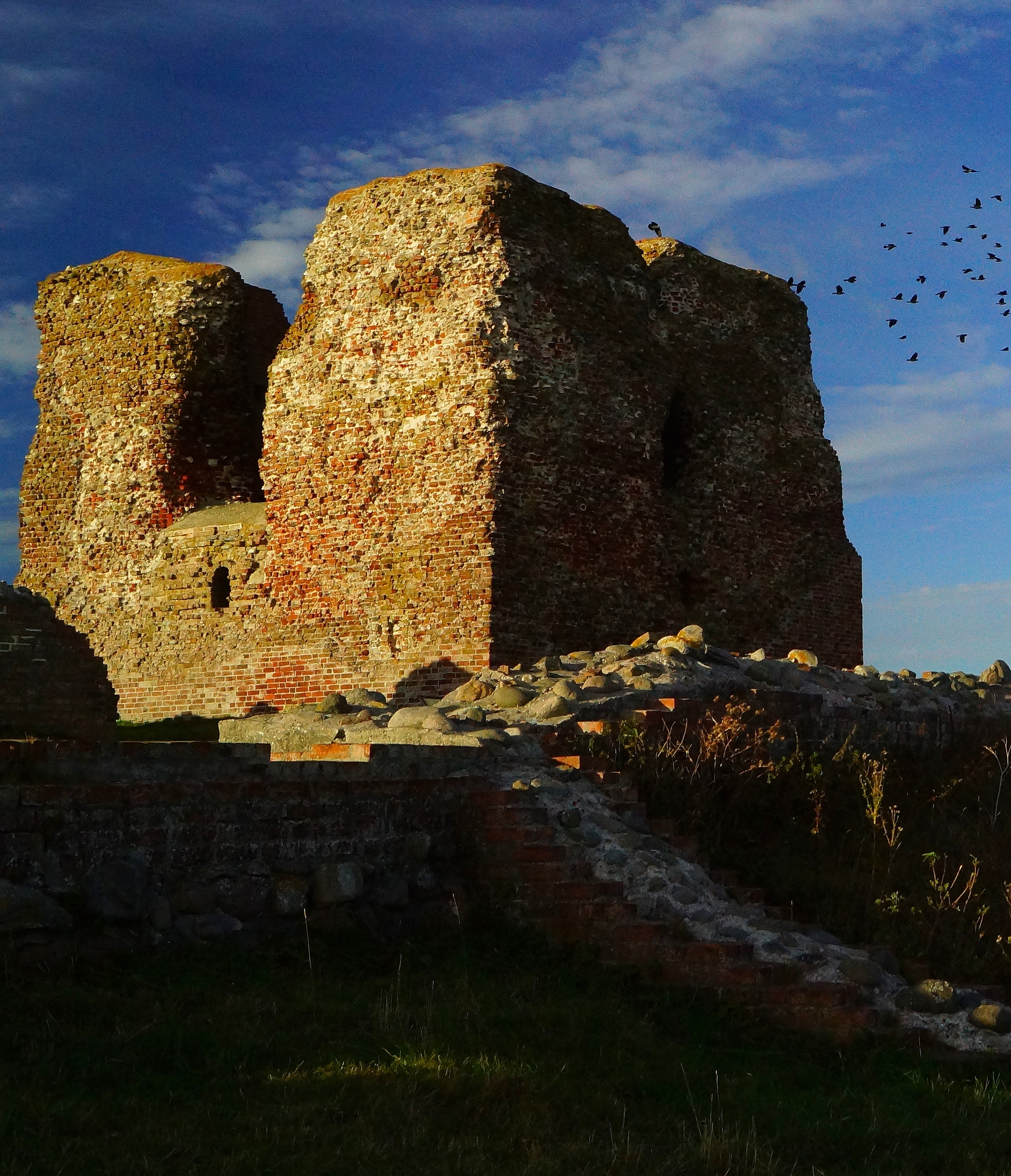
The oak timber that Karlsladen was built from may have come from a barn by Kalø Castle - here seen as a ruin. The castle, located on a peninsula in Aarhus Bay, down from the town Rønde, was abandoned in 1660.

The nearly 300-year-old barn is built in the Holstein style with timbered walls, a wide building, with a pitched and thatched roof. It has been said that the massive inner oak timber might originate from stranded ships in Køge Bay on the east coast of the island Zealand, south of the Danish capital, Copenhagen. Others are of the opinion that the timber might have been reused from a barn that was part of Kalø Castle. A barn supposedly located north of the existing Kalø Castle Ruin on the Kalø peninsula 3 kilometers from Karlsladen. Kalø Castle was abandoned in 1660, but the barn by the castle might still have been there as late as 1722, five years before the completion of Karlsladen in the nearby hills.

== Restoration ==
A colonnade of heavy load-bearing oak timber pillars and a visible upper oak construction inside Karlsladen defines the architecture of the single inner room. As part of the restoration the elongated lofty building was cleared of the remnants of prior use, including the use of part of the barn as a pig stable for some years, and the division of part of it into a number of floors for storage of grain and sheaves. The result is that the original heavy timber construction all the way up to the thatched roof is visible today. During the restoration it was necessary to replace the first meter of the lower part of many of the load-bearing oak pillars due to rot and wear. This was a task that demanded specialized carpentry, giving back the original strength to the construction without compromising the way it was built and looked in 1727.

As part of the renovation in 2013, the building was given a thatched roof in line with its original roofing. It had been given a tile roof in 1941, which was removed as part of the 2013 renovation.

Karsladen was converted to a visitors centre as part of a 40 million kroner (£4.78 million) project, "Ferieoplevelser i Nationalpark Mols Bjerge" - Vacation Experience in Mols Bjerge National Park. The National Park was established in 2009 and covers 180 km^{2}. The funding included establishing another visitors centre in the National Park at Øvre Strandkær and other new facilities in the park. These included 6 kayak campsites along the coast of southern Djursland, two horse trailer parking sites, a number of bicycle trails and signposts in the park plus park folders. The project spanned 4 years. The 40 million kroner came from three public and semipublic sources. Arbejsmarkedets Feriefond provided two-thirds of the funding. The state department, Naturstyrelsen, together with Syddjurs Municipality provided the remaining third.

== Visitor centre ==
After restoration in 2013, an attempt has been made to use Karlsladen for different kinds of events, but the building does not seem entirely suitable for many types of gatherings. For a large part the charm of the big room is based on the two visible and massive oak timber colonnades across the whole floor plane, but these hinder a free view through the room. There are no upper floors in the tall building, and this makes it nearly impossible to heat up the space, where winter temperatures on average hover around 0 °C. Also the rectangular stable shape might not be particularly functional for music and theatre events.

The exhibition at the visitors' centre is unstaffed. Its purpose is to convey aspects of local nature and natural history from Mols Bjerge National Park on the southern part of the Djursland peninsula in Denmark. The main themes are prehistoric times, the Kalø Castle Ruin and wildlife and hunting around Kalø. The latter is related to a research station under Aarhus University that is part of the Kalø Estate. The visitors centre includes a series of posters, a model of the medieval Kalø Castle, and an area for children. Here one can hear taped stories, such as about how the Swedish king, Gustav Vasa, was imprisoned at Kalø Castle in 1518-19, until he escaped from the castle peninsula by wading through the sea during the night at low tide.

== Gallery ==
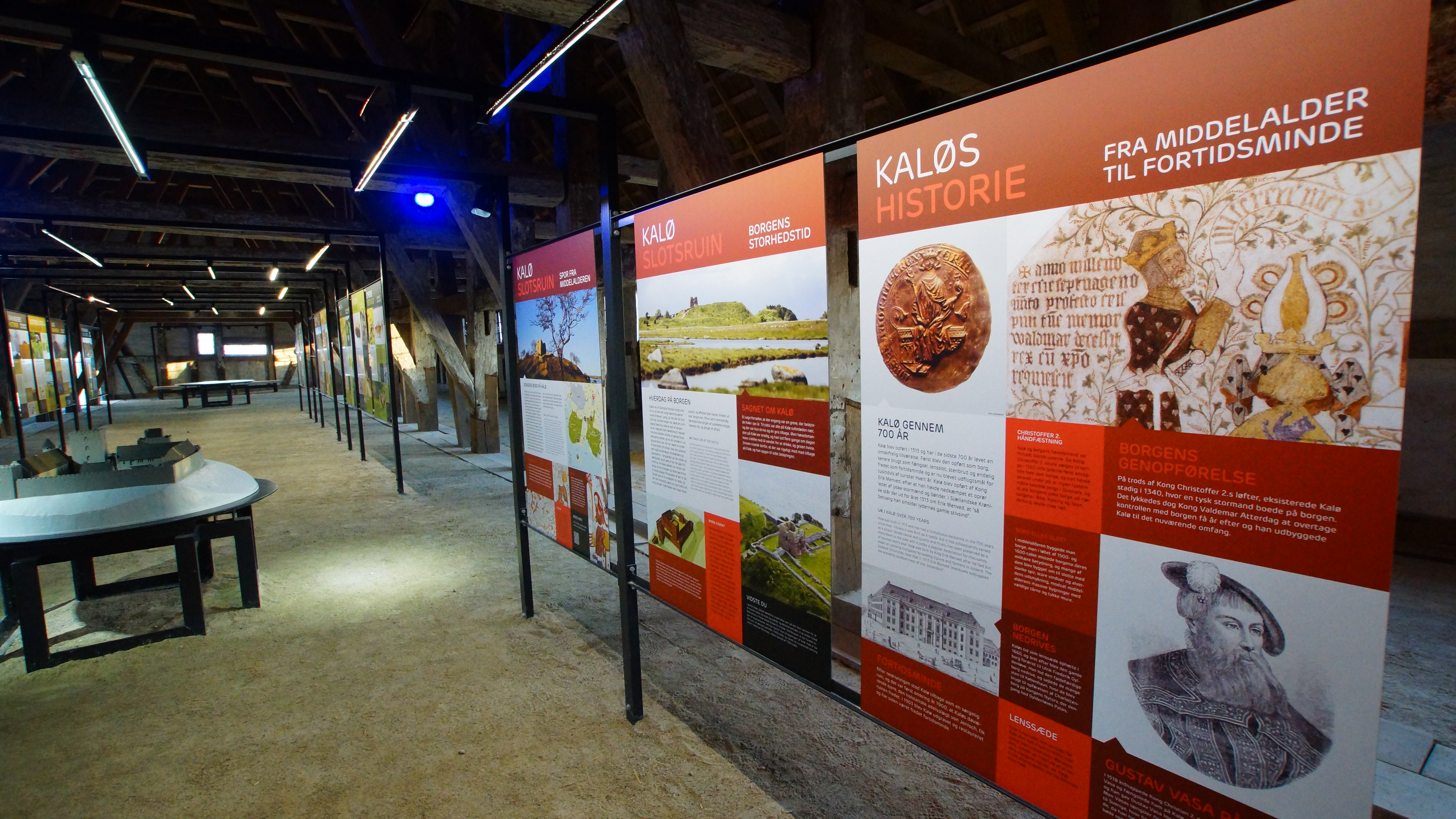
Displays inside the visitors centre, 2016.

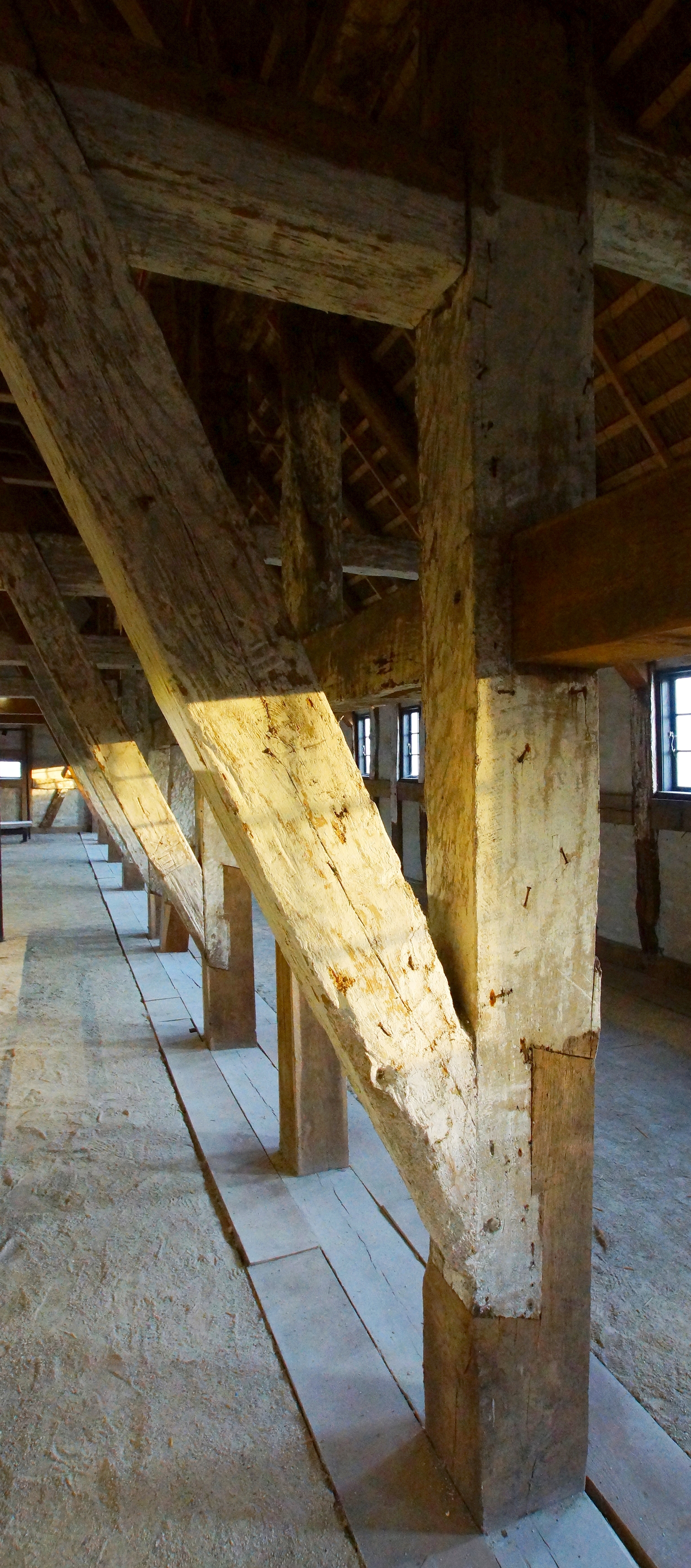
The bottom part of many of the heavy, load-bearing oak pillars was replaced with new timber in 2013.

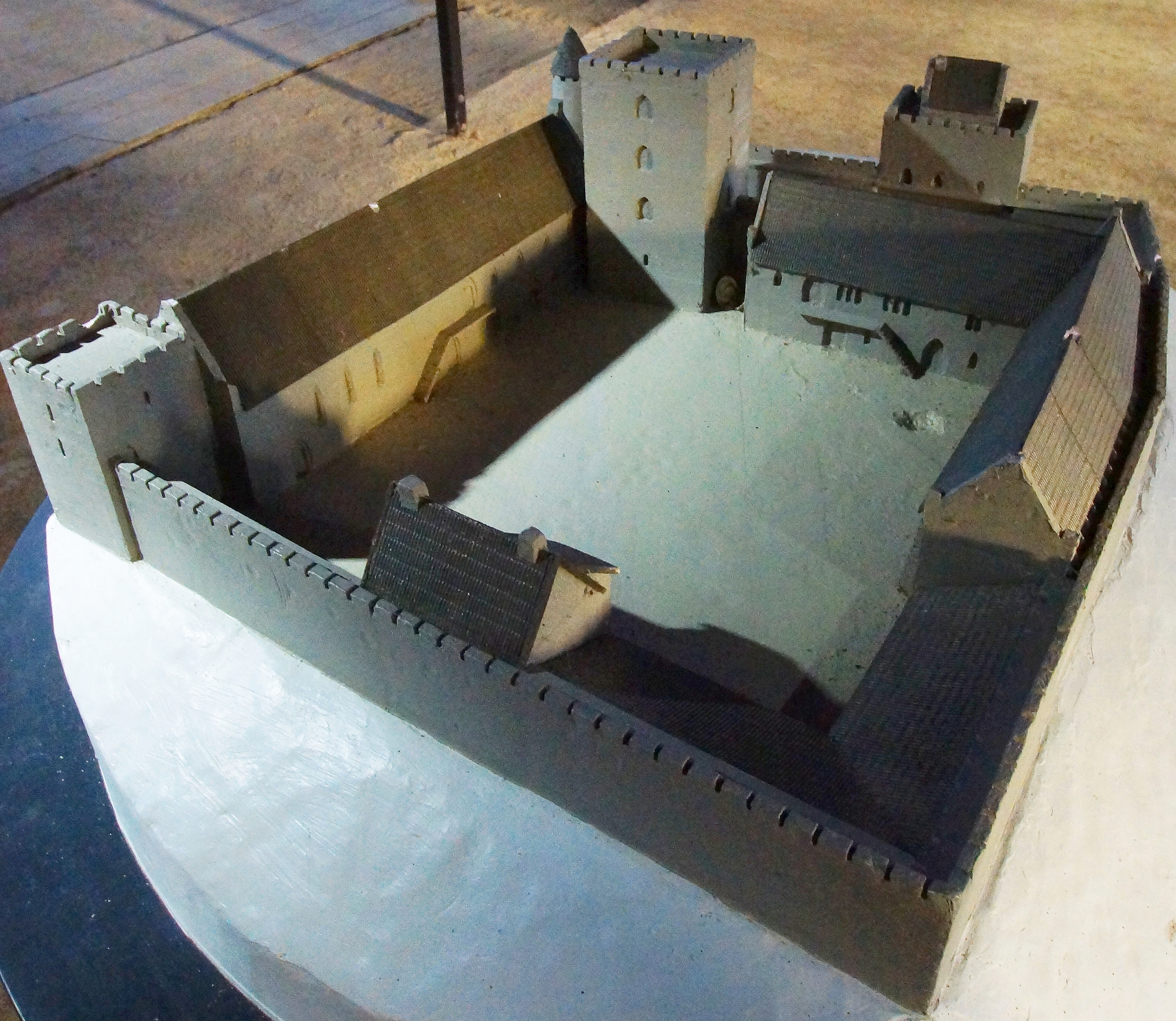
Model of Kalø Castle, showing how the castle might have looked in the Middle Ages. Today, the castle is a ruin 3km from Karlsladen, often visited by tourists.
