= Fårup Summer Park =

Amusement park in Denmark

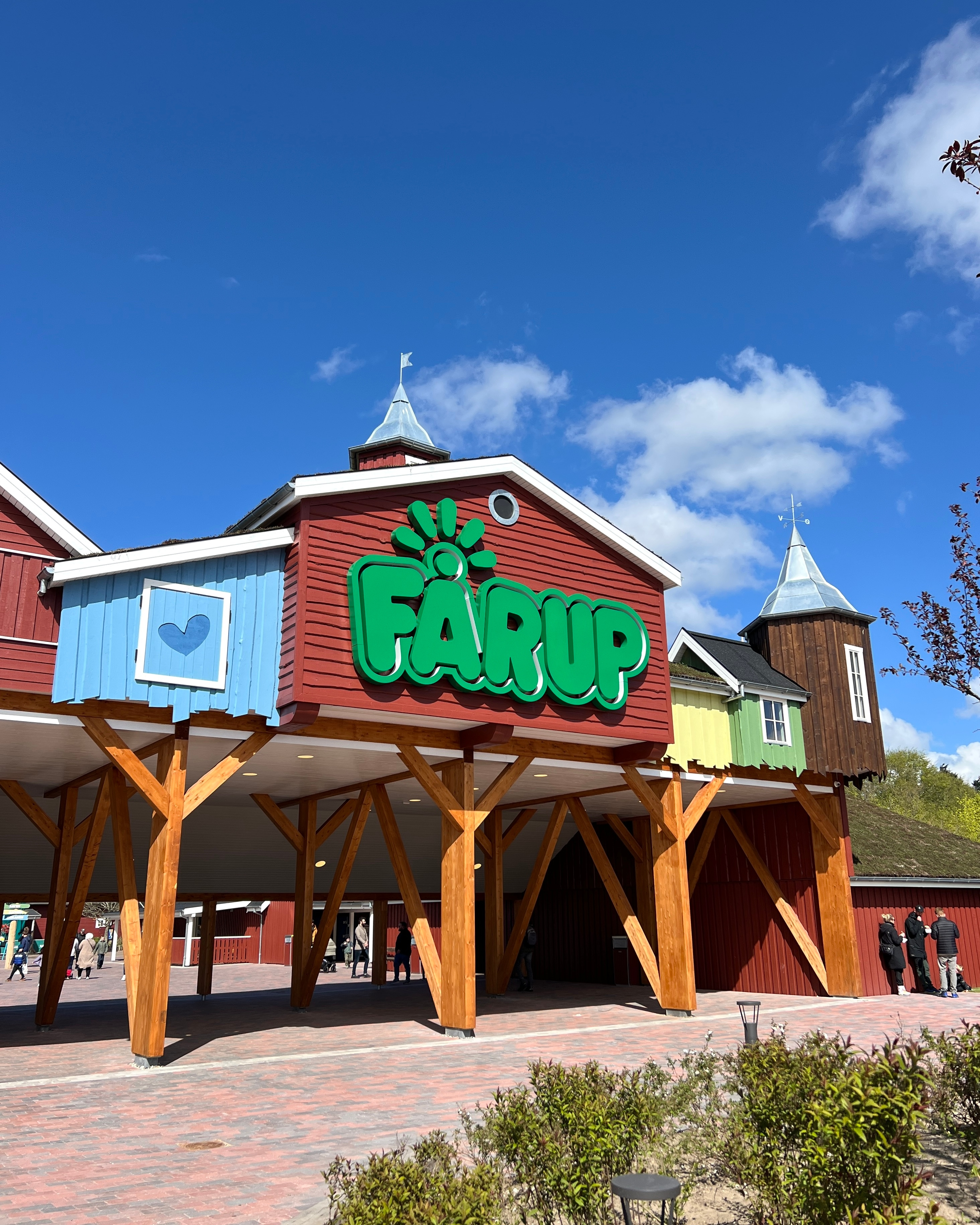
- Park entrance
- Interactive map of Fårup Summer Park
- Location: Fårup, Jammerbugt, North Jutland, Denmark
- Coordinates: 57°16′15″N 9°38′50″E
- Status: Operating
- Public transit: Fårup Sommerland, Nordjyllands Trafikselskab seasonal lines 77 and 200.; Saltum Bymidte, various year-round lines.
- Opened: 21 June 1975
- Theme: General
- Slogan: De største opplevelsene i Europas bedste park (lit. 'The biggest experiences in Europe's best park')
- Operating season: April/May–September and mid-October (Occasional outside the main seasons)
- Area: 24 ha (59 acres)

Attractions
- Roller coasters: 8
- Water rides: 2
- Website: https://www.faarupsommerland.dk/en/

Fårup Summer Park (Danish: Fårup Sommerland) is a theme park located in Fårup between Blokhus and Løkken in North Jutland, Denmark. The park, as the name suggests, is open during the summer months and attracts about 600,000 people each season. It is one of Denmark's biggest amusement parks and has the largest water park of any amusement park in the country. The park currently has seven roller coasters and many other rides as well.

== History ==
Opened on 21 June 1975 by the Kragelund family, which had been in the wholesale business in Aalborg for 90 years when Anders Kragelund decided to sell and start a new business - an amusement park. He chose for the site of this venture North Jutland, a beautiful and popular holiday area in Denmark. The amusement park opened small with only a handful of children´s rides and attracted about 40.000 guests in its first operating season in 1975. Over the years the park has grown in popularity and been expanded in area as well, by 1983 many new rides had been added and about 350.000 people visited the park that year. In 1989 a water park was added (Djurs Sommerland had added a water park in 1985). Since 2001 the park has added 5 new roller coasters to its slate, most recently in 2012 and 2013.

The amusement park is for people of all ages, and the majority of the park's rides are geared toward children. Some of the rides are themed, but the park is not divided into themed areas. The grounds are landscaped with numerous trees and a lake that separates the amusement park from the water park. The Aqua Park is included in the admission price.

== Attractions ==
=== Roller coasters ===
Ride name	Photo	Type	Year opened	Manufacturer	Additional information
Falken (The Falcon)	Falken (The Falcon)	Wooden sit down	2004	S&S Worldwide, built by Gerstlauer	Reaches a speed 75 km/h (47 mph) on a 622 m (2,041 ft) long track and a height of 20 m (66 ft). Minimum height for people on the ride is 1.1 m (3.6 ft). Train 2x15.
Flagermusen (The Bat)	Flagermusen (The Bat)	Steel sit down wild mouse	2001	Reverchon	This wild mouse coaster reaches a speed of 47 km/h (29 mph) on a 420 m (1,380 ft) long track and a height of 13 m (43 ft). Minimum height to ride the coaster is 1.15 m (3.8 ft). Car 2+2.
Fønix (The Phoenix)	Fønix (The Fenix)	Steel sit down	2022	Vekoma	Sit-down Looping Coaster.
Lynet (The Lightning)	Lynet (The Lightning)	LSM-launched steel sit down	2008	Gerstlauer	This single car (2 m × 3 m (6.6 ft × 9.8 ft)) coaster launches its riders to 80 km/h (50 mph) in just 2 seconds on a 540 m (1,770 ft) long track and a height of 20 m (66 ft) with two inversions. Minimum height to ride the coaster is 1.2 m (3.9 ft). Launch Coaster 540 model.
Mine Expressen	Mine Expressen	Steel sit down	1992	Vekoma	Reaches a speed of 46 km/h (29 mph) on a 335 m (1,099 ft) long track and a height of 13 m (43 ft). Age limit is 5 years old. 335m Junior Coaster model.
Pindsvinet (The Hedgehog)	Pindsvinet (The Hedgehog)	Steel sit down	2012	Zamperla	Family 80STD Gravity Coaster.
Orkanen (The Hurricane)	Orkanen	Steel Inverted / Suspended	2013	Vekoma	Reaches a speed of 76 km/h (47 mph) on a 453 m (1,486 ft) long track and a height of 20 m (66 ft). Suspended Family Coaster.
Saven (The Saw)	Saven (The Saw)	Steel shuttle	2020	Vekoma	Family Boomerang Coaster.

=== Water rides ===
- Farup Rafting - river rapids ride that opened in 1998. This six-passenger raft ride navigates a 470 m (1,540 ft) long course. Designer: Bear Rides.
- Træstammerne (The Tree Trunks) - log flume ride that opened in 1991. A 230 m (750 ft) long Colorado-themed ride with three drops, the highest of which is 11 m (36 ft). Designer: Big Country Motioneering.

=== Other rides ===
- Crazy Golf - mini golf course opened in 2018.
- Farup Boats - sail your own boat on the lake.
- Farup Railway - a 1930s style railroad.
- 4D Cinema - shows a 4D film, the theater opened in 2006.
- Forest Rush - spinner ride that opened in 2009. Height limit 1.1 m (3.6 ft)
- Rowing Boats - row your own boat on the lake.
- Rævens Hule (The Fox Hole) - fun house that opened in 2010.

=== Rides for children ===
- Air Trampolines - trampolines, opened in 1994.
- Canoes - paddle your own canoe on the lake.
- Children's Tower - an 11 m (36 ft) tall drop tower for kids that opened in 2005. Designer: Zierer.
- Excavators - operate your own digger, opened in 1994.
- Farup Racing Team - roundabout.
- Gold Digging - pan for gold.
- Horses - ride the Icelandic horses.
- Pedal Boats - pedal your own boat on the lake.
- Pedal GoKarts - pedal karts that opened in 2002.
- Play Ground - play area for the kids that opened in 2000.
- The Red Baron - airplanes. Designer: Zamperla.
- Safari Cars - on track safari cars.
- Shooting - test your skill shooting, opened in 2001.
- The Spider - challenge course that opened in 2002.
- The Spinning Tree - rocking tug that opened in 2009. Designer: Zierer.
- Teacups - spinning tea cups. Designer: Zierer.
- Traffic School - kids can drive their own car, opened in 1990. Height limit 1.1 m (3.6 ft) max.
- Trampolines - trampolines.
- Treasure Hunt - challenge course that opened in 1996 and expanded in 2010.
- Volcano - climbing course that opened in 2002.

=== Water Park ===
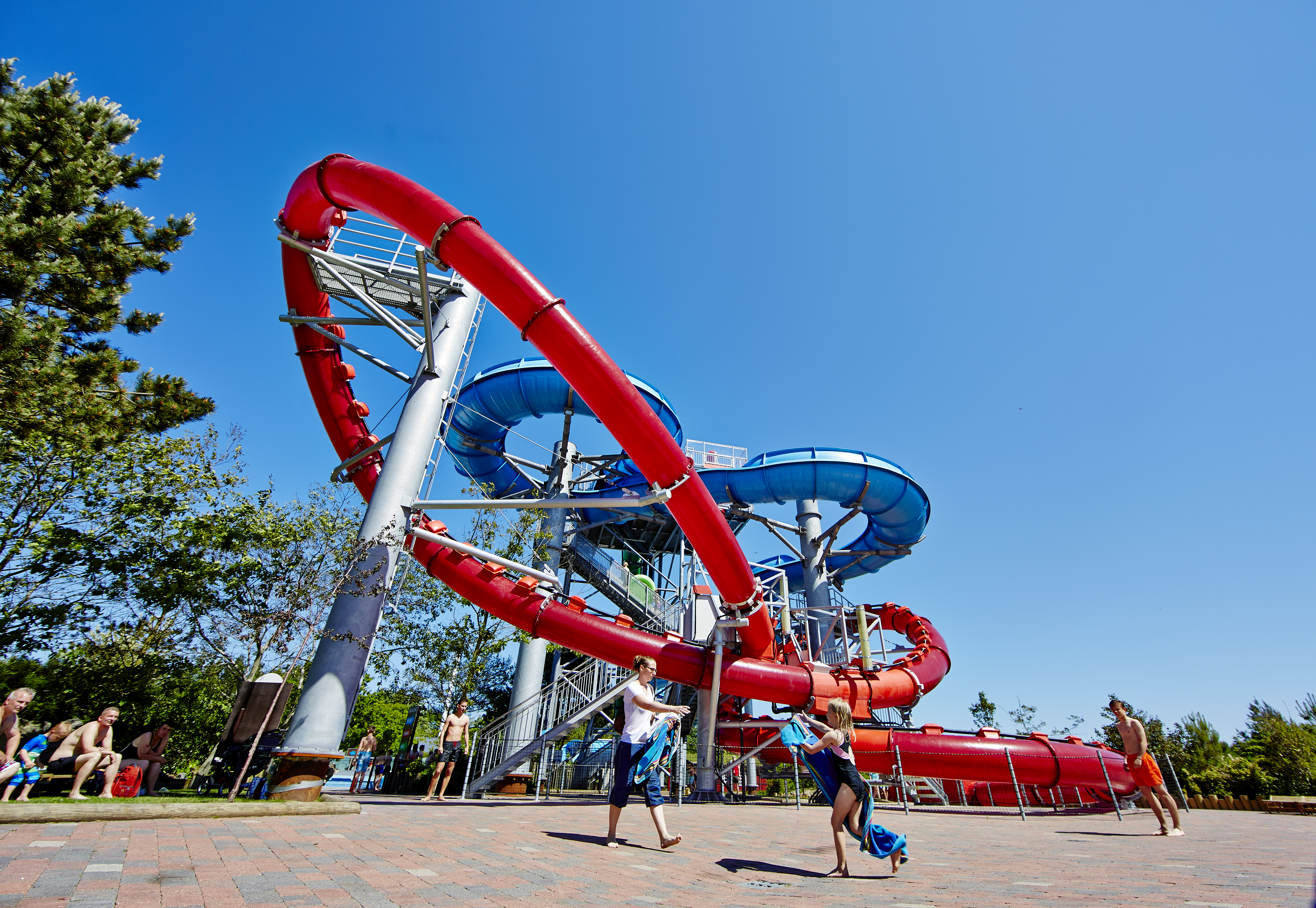
Water Cannon looping slide (red) and Vandslagen raft slide (blue)

The water park opened in 1989 and is included in the admission price.

- Stormfloden - A WhiteWater West raft slide with a "Tailspin" saucer and "Boomerango" half pipe that will open in 2024.
- Flodraketten - Two WhiteWater West body slides that race side by side, set to open in 2024.
- Children's Complex - Water play area for kids that first opened in 1989 and was rebuilt in 2024.
- Surf Hill - body slide that opened in 1989.
- Vandslagen - Family rafting ride that opened in 2011.
- Wave Pool - A 1,200 m^{2} (13,000 ft^{2}) large wave pool that opened in 1993 - is heated to 27 degrees.
- Wild River - three different tube rides that opened in 1989.
- Water Cannon - free fall and two loops - opened in 2015
- Water Fall - a 35 metre water slide that goes in only one direction: Down!

=== Former Attractions ===
- Mini-Lynet - A powered roller coaster (2003 - 2008).
- Vandcyklonen - Bowl slide (2007 - 2023).
- Water Slide - A 130 m (430 ft) long body slide (1989 - 2023).

=== Shows ===
The park hosts various special events throughout the summer season including motor cycle meet, open air music concerts and more.

=== Extras ===
- Arcade Games
- Test Your Skill Games
