= Fønix (roller coaster) =

Steel roller coaster at Fårup Summer Park

Fårup Sommerland
- Location: Fårup Sommerland
- Coordinates: 57.26818°N 9.65829°E
- Status: Operating
- Opening date: April 9, 2022
- Cost: $100,000,000 DKK

General statistics
- Type: Steel
- Manufacturer: Vekoma
- Designer: Benjamin Bloemendaal
- Model: Wildcat
- Lift/launch system: Chain lift hill
- Height: 131.2 ft (40.0 m)
- Length: 2,969.2 ft (905.0 m)
- Speed: 59 mph (95 km/h)
- Inversions: 3
- Duration: 1:20
- Max vertical angle: 80°
- Capacity: 900 riders per hour
- G-force: 4.1
- Height restriction: 120 cm (3 ft 11 in)
- Trains: 2 trains with 4 cars. Riders are arranged 2 across in 2 rows for a total of 16 riders per train.
- Website: Official website
- Fønix at RCDB

Fønix ("Phoenix" in English) is a steel roller coaster at Fårup Sommerland in Blokhus, North Jutland, Denmark. The coaster was announced on June 23, 2021, and opened to become Denmark's tallest and fastest. Fønix represents a DKK 100 million investment, the largest in the park's 46-year history with the second largest only being DKK 44 million on Orkanen in 2013. Fønix was designed and manufactured by Vekoma, and features 3 inversions - including the world's first "stall loop" element - as well as 14 airtime moments.

== History ==
Development of roller coaster from Dutch manufacturer Vekoma began as early as mid-to-late 2019, around the same time that the park was preparing to install Saven - another Vekoma project - for the 2020 season. The then-unpublicized Wildcat coaster layout was offered as an option, but was leaked online in December 2019 by another prospective client, the proposed (and failed) Magic Land park in Bosnia. Officials from Magic Land were alleged to have broken a non-disclosure agreement for marketing purposes, resulting in a significant amount of attention being drawn to the concept, although it was not connected to Fårup Sommerland until its formal announcement.

In March 2021, Fårup Sommerland received approval from the Jammerbugt Municipality to build a coaster under the working title Woodland, which would stand 37 meters tall and occupy a surface area of 9700 m^{2}. Three years earlier, the park had already received approval to build structures standing up to 40 meters tall within their perimeter. Land preparation began in April, where the park began clearing out trees on the eastern side of the property. Speculation quickly centered around Vekoma, who in recent months had begun teasing a major 2020 coaster project in Europe with "award winning potential". Using park teasers, fans eventually determined the name of the new coaster to be Fønix (Danish for "Phoenix").

Fønix was formally announced on June 23, 2021, an attraction set to shatter domestic records and become Denmark's tallest and fastest coaster, surpassing Piraten at Djurs Sommerland. An animated rendering was also released by Vekoma. In July 2021, the first track pieces began to arrive at the park. The lift hill was topped off in October 2021. That same month, the track layout was completed. Fønix officially opened to the public on April 9, 2022.

== Ride experience ==
The train exits the station and dips to the left into a trench before hitting the lift hill. After climbing to a peak height of 131.2-foot (40.0 m), the coaster plunges down an 80° drop into its signature "stall loop" inversion. The train exits through an S-bend and first airtime hill of many, leading into a right hand turnaround and heartline roll. Turning to the right, riders continue through a series of twisted airtime hills into a station-fly-through corkscrew. Turning around into the coaster finale, the train navigates a series of bunny hills before making a final counterclockwise turnaround and twist into the brake run. Another left-hand turn leads back into the station, where riders unload. A full ride on the coaster from station dispatch to brakes lasts about 1 minute 20 seconds.

== Characteristics ==
=== Statistics ===
Fønix is 2,969.2 feet (905.0 m) long, stands 131.2 feet (40.0 m) tall, and reach a top speed of 59 mph (95 km/h). The attraction runs a pair of 16-passenger trains, each of which have 4 cars that can seat 2 rows of 2 riders. As a result, capacity is estimated to be 900 people per hour. Throughout the ride, riders are subject to g-forces as high as +4.1 Gs and as low as -1.1 Gs. The coaster itself is built upon 170 foundations.

=== Features ===
Fønix features three inversions; a world-first "stall loop" (cross between a vertical loop and inverted top hat), a heartline roll, and a corkscrew directly through the station building (similar to that of Lech Coaster at Legendia). In addition, Fønix contains 14 airtime moments throughout the ride - making up 9.2 seconds of ride time - and two below-ground trench dives.

== Rankings ==
Golden Ticket Awards: Top steel Roller Coasters
Year									1998	1999
Ranking									–	–
Year	2000	2001	2002	2003	2004	2005	2006	2007	2008	2009
Ranking	–	–	–	–	–	–	–	–	–	–
Year	2010	2011	2012	2013	2014	2015	2016	2017	2018	2019
Ranking	–	–	–	–	–	–	–	–	–	–
Year	2020	2021	2022	2023	2024	2025				
Ranking	N/A	–	–	33	50	–				
