= Hvilsager =

Danish village

- Village
- Location in Denmark
- Coordinates: 56°22′10″N 10°20′57″E
- Country: Denmark
- Region: Central Denmark
- Time zone: UTC+1 (CET)
  - Summer (DST): UTC+2 (CEST)
- Postal code: 8544

Hvilsager is a village of Djursland located in Hvilsager Parish and Syddjurs Municipality. The Indian anthropologist Prakash Reddy did field work in the village in 1989, and published his observations in the book Sådan er danskerne! En indisk antropologs perspektiv på det danske samfund, translated into English as Danes are like that! Perspectives of an Indian anthropologist on the Danish society.
