= Orkanen =

Suspended family roller coaster at Fårup Summer Park

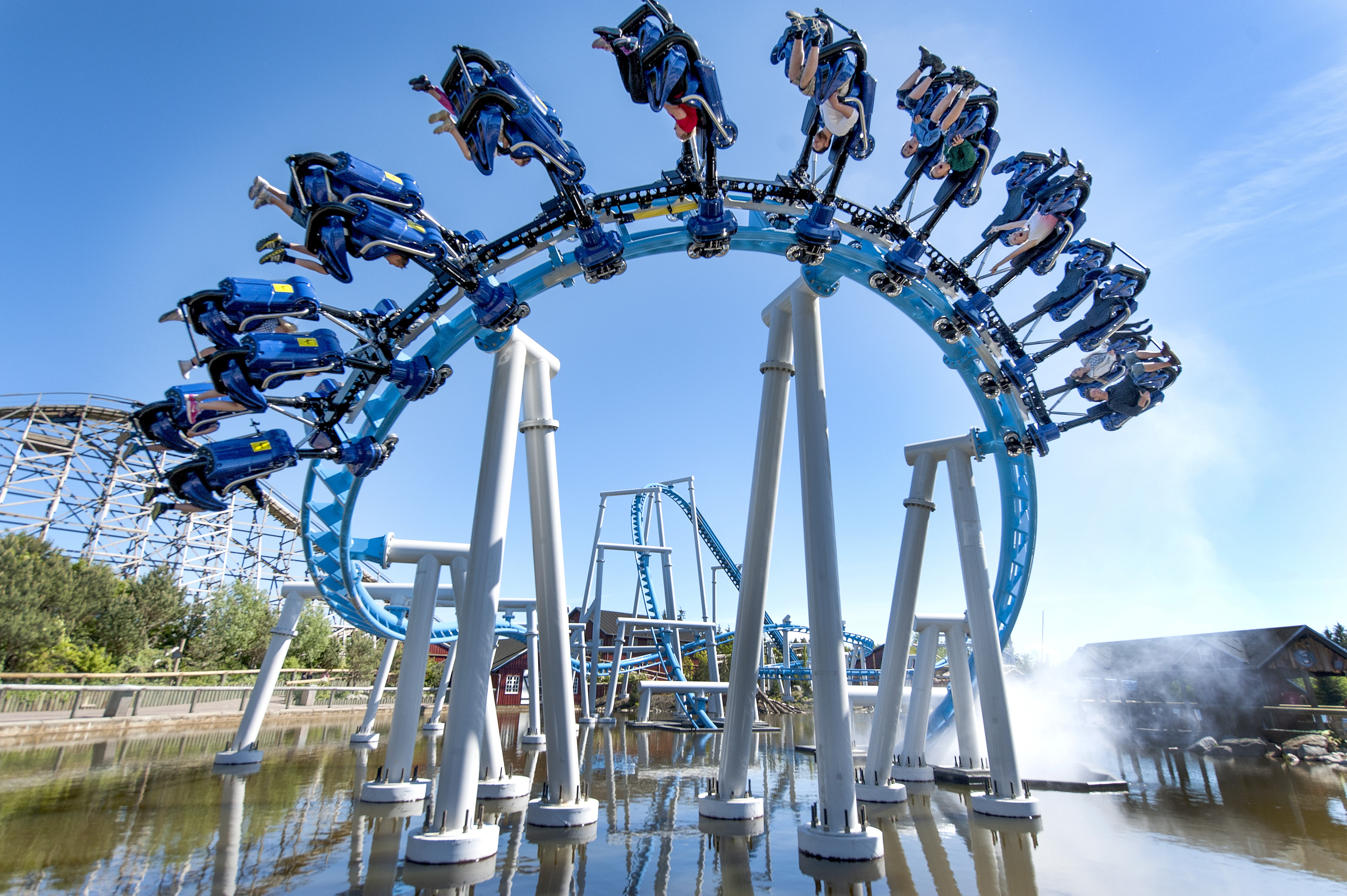

Fårup Sommarland
- Location: Fårup Sommarland
- Coordinates: 57.269995°N 9.645277°E
- Status: Operating
- Opening date: June 5, 2013
- Cost: 35,000,000 DKK (2012)

General statistics
- Type: Steel – Family – Inverted
- Manufacturer: Vekoma
- Model: Suspended Family Coaster (453m)
- Track layout: Twister
- Lift/launch system: Drive tire
- Height: 63.3 ft (19.3 m)
- Length: 1,486.2 ft (453.0 m)
- Speed: 46.6 mph (75.0 km/h)
- Inversions: 0
- Duration: 1:00
- Capacity: 670 riders per hour
- G-force: 3
- Height restriction: 105 cm (3 ft 5 in)
- Trains: Single train with 10 cars. Riders are arranged 2 across in a single row for a total of 20 riders per train.
- Website: Official website
- Orkanen at RCDB

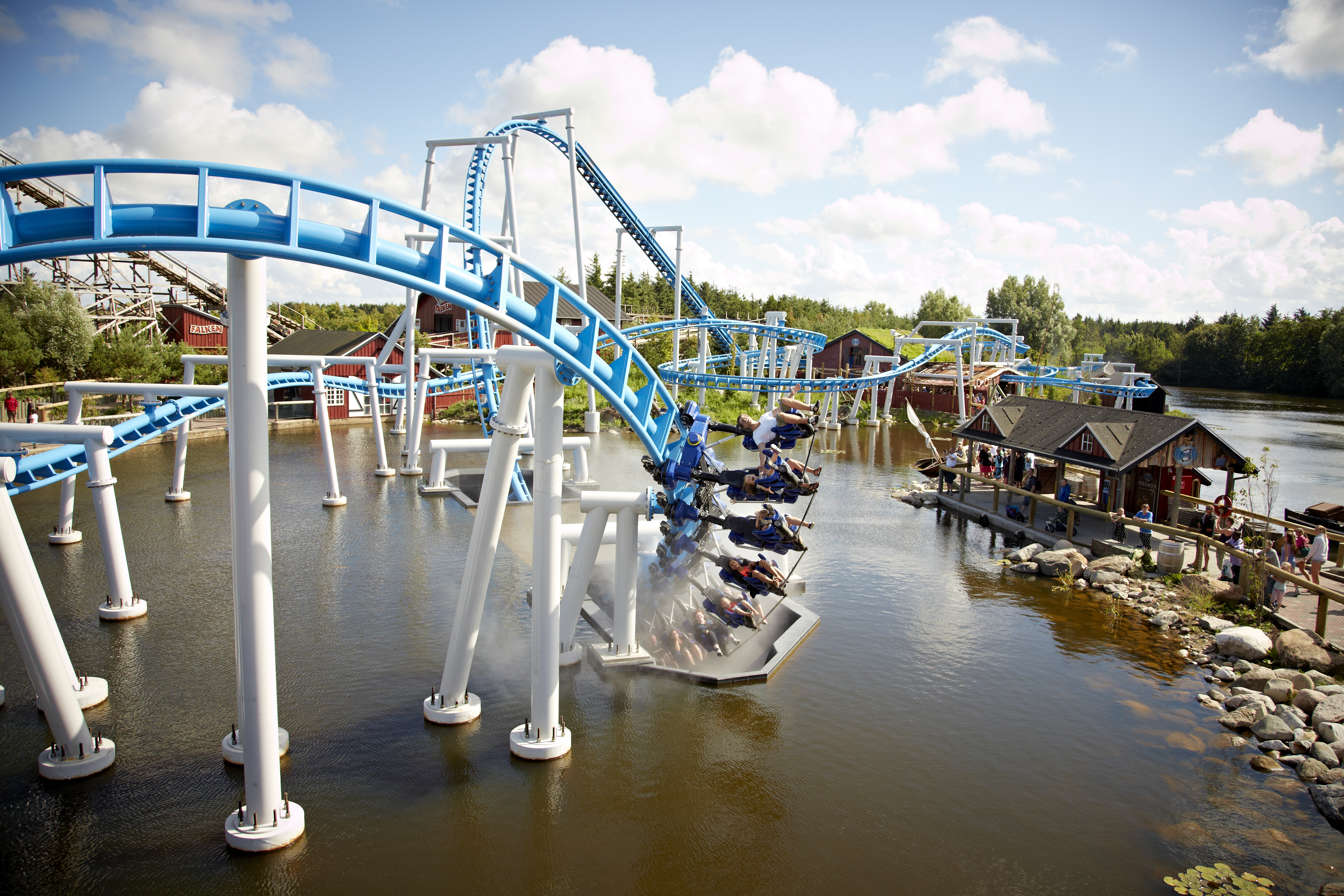
Overview of Orkanen

Orkanen ("Hurricane" in English) is a Vekoma Suspended Family Coaster at Fårup Sommarland in Blokhus, North Jutland, Denmark. The coaster opened in 2013, and represented a 35,000,000 DKK investment, which was billed as the park's most expensive addition until Fønix opened in 2022.

== History ==
On August 17, 2012, Fårup Sommarland officially announced the addition of the Orkanen roller coaster for the 2013 season, which would be located on the west side of the park and maneuver over and under a lake. A model was set up in the Falken onride photo building, and an animated rendering depicting the ride experience was also released. Construction took place throughout the fall and winter of 2012/2013, which required the temporary drainage of the lake as so to be able to install the ride's signature underwater tunnel, footers, and new landmasses. Orkanen was officially opened to the public on June 5, 2013.

In 2015, the park implemented a Livestreaming function on the coaster, allowing riders to broadcast their ride live online if they chose to do so.

== Characteristics ==
=== Layout ===
Dispatching the station, the train makes a 90° left turn into the lift hill, which utilizes drive tires to propel it to its 63.3-foot (19.3 m) height. Upon reaching the top, riders bank slightly to the left and plunge into an underwater tunnel, rising up into a forceful overbanked turn (similar to a Cutback). The train speeds up into a helix, following a jump over the station building and yet another helix. Riders twist into a turnaround, pass through another tunnel, and make a final 90° turn into the station, where the train comes to a stop. The entire ride lasts just one minute.

=== Statistics ===
Orkanen has a top speed of 46.6 mph (75.0 km/h), a peak height of 63.3 feet (19.3 m), and a total length of 1,486.2 feet (453.0 m). The coaster passes through two tunnels, one of which is located under the lake and is 18 metres (59 ft) in length. It runs a single, 20 passenger train, which restrains guests with lap bars and is mounted below the track.

=== Model ===
Orkanen was manufactured by Dutch-firm Vekoma, and is the original of the 453 m variant of their Suspended Family Coaster model. Various clones of the ride were produced soon after, including Dragonflier at Dollywood in Pigeon Forge, Tennessee, and Dragon Roller Coaster at Energylandia in Zator, Poland. As of 2021, 11 of the 453 m variants are either in operation or under construction across the globe.

== Incidents ==
On October 14, 2015, a park employee was struck and seriously injured by Orkanen's moving train whilst retrieving a lost bag for a guest. Park representatives later stated that his actions were in violation of park safety codes and an investigation was underway.

== Reception ==
Orkanen received high praise from the general public and roller coaster enthusiasts alike, and was subsequently named Europe's second best new coaster by German magazine Kirmes & Park Revue.
