= Hornslet =

- Town
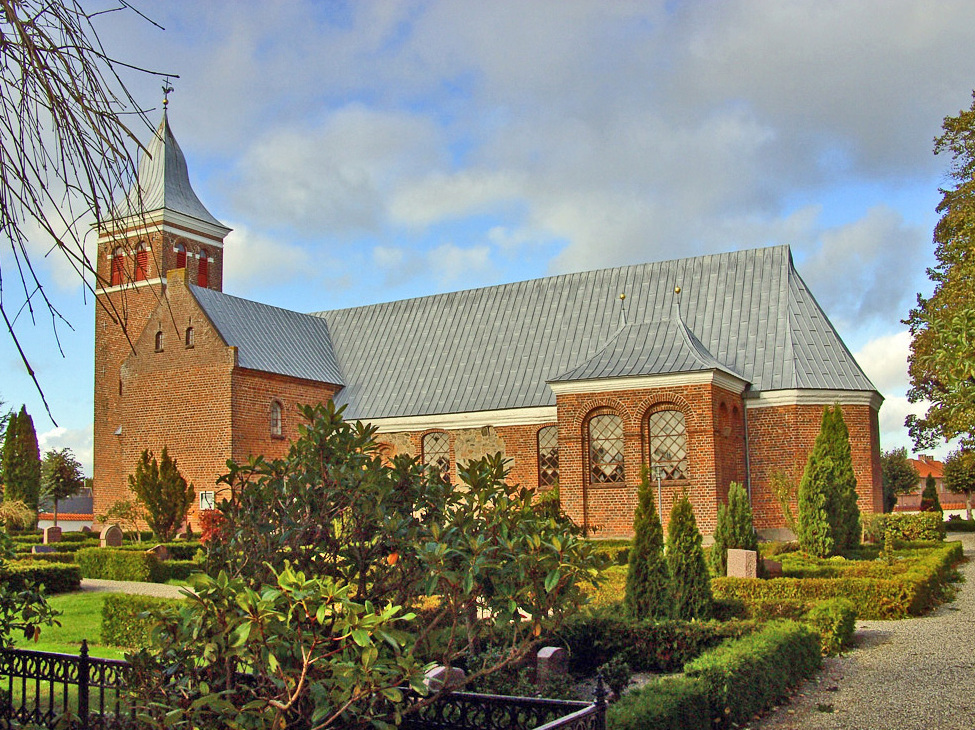
- Hornslet Church

- Location in Denmark Hornslet (Central Denmark Region)
- Coordinates: 56°18′57″N 10°19′0″E
- Country: Denmark
- Region: Region Midtjylland
- Municipality: Syddjurs Municipality

Area
  - Urban: 3.5 km^{2} (1.4 sq mi)

Population (2026)
  - Urban: 6,446
  - Urban density: 1,800/km^{2} (4,800/sq mi)
  - Gender: 3,162 males and 3,284 females
- Time zone: UTC+1 (CET)
  - Summer (DST): UTC+2 (CEST)
- Postal code: DK-8543 Hornslet

Hornslet is a town located in East Jutland, on the southwestern part of the Djursland peninsula, Denmark. It is a commuter town of the city of Aarhus, which lies approximately 28 kilometers to the southwest, and a railway town at Grenaabanen, the railroad between the cities of Aarhus and Grenaa. Hornslet is located in Syddjurs Municipality, which in turn is part of Region Midtjylland, and has a population of 6,446 (1 January 2026).

Rosenholm Castle, which belongs to the Rosenkrantz family, is located immediately outside the town. The castle was recently best known for having given facilities to DR's julekalender "Christmas at the Castle" from 1986.

In the past, Hornslet was the largest town in and municipal seat of Rosenholm Municipality. 1. January 2007, it was merged with the neighbouring municipality of Rønde, to form the current Syddjurs Municipality.

In 2008 a spectacular collapse of a wind turbine took place, which was filmed.

== Notable people ==
- Iver Rosenkrantz (1674 in at Rosenholm Castle – 1745) a Danish statesman and landowner, buried at Hornslet Church
