= Poskær Stenhus =

The Poskær Round Barrow in Denmark
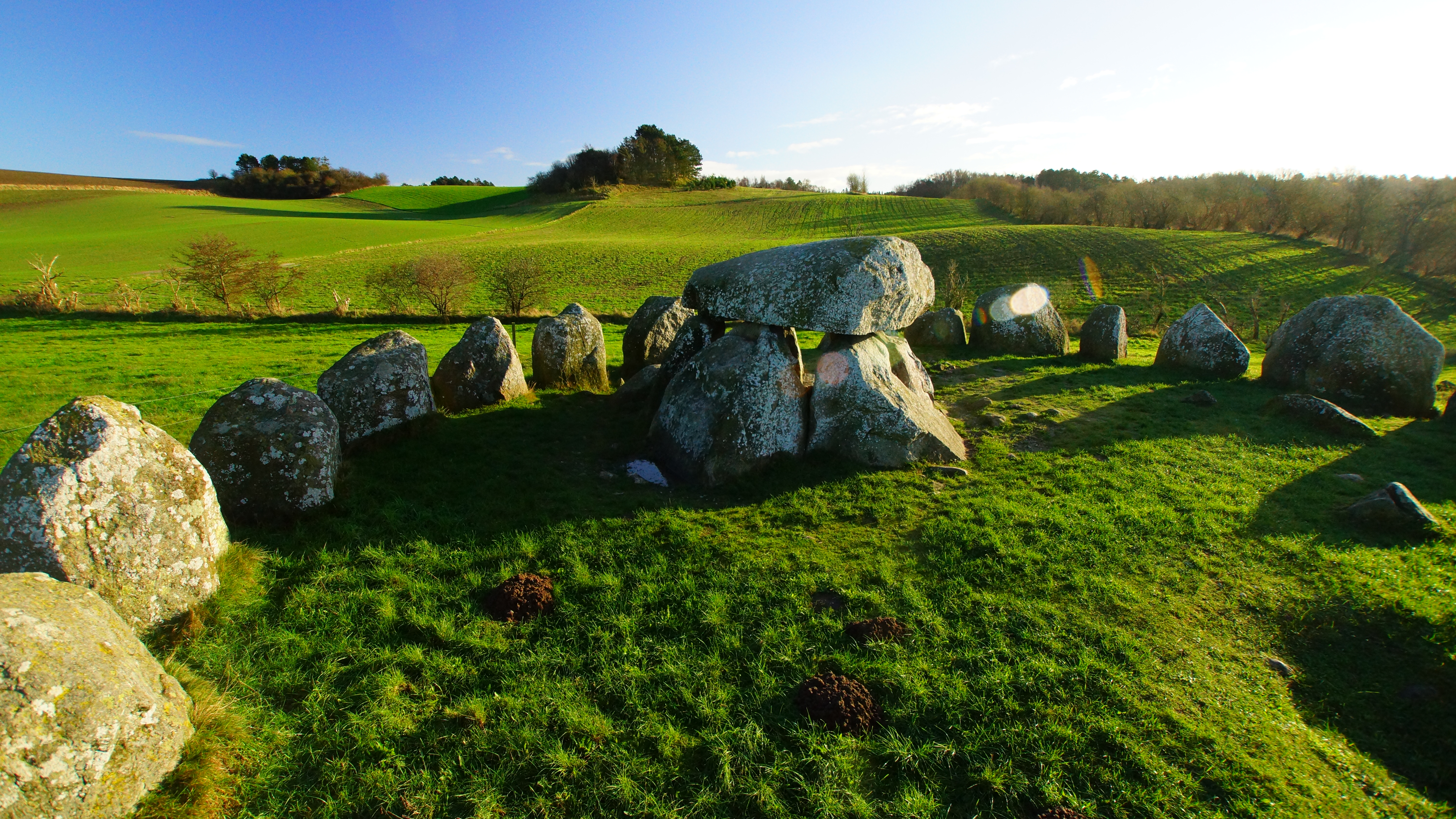
- 23 man-high slabs are placed in a circle around the Porskær central dolmen.

- Location within Denmark
- Location: Syddjurs Municipality
- Nearest city: Ebeltoft
- Coordinates: 56°13′26.88″N 10°30′45.15″E

Poskær Stenhus is the largest round barrow in Denmark, dating back to 3.300 B.C. It is located by the village Knebel on the hilly southern part of the peninsula Djursland, at the entrance to the Baltic Sea between Denmark and Sweden in northern Europe. The central burial chamber is equipped with a capstone weighing 11 tonnes (12 tons), surrounded by 23 slabs taller than a man, forming a circle.

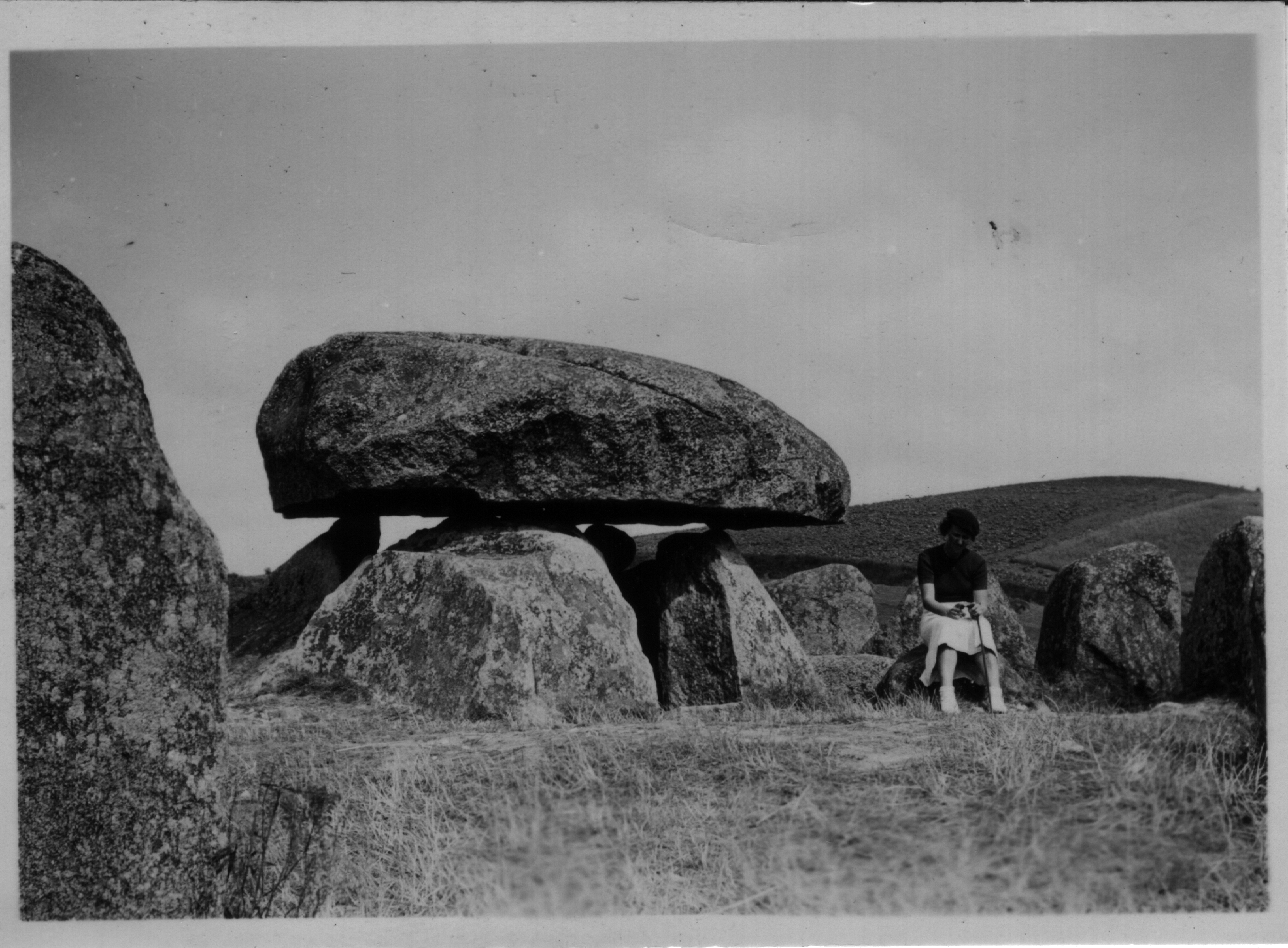
The Poskær Dolmen, as seen in this picture from 1937 (person beside it for scale)

The capstone is the lesser half of a granite slab brought to Denmark from Northern Scandinavia by ice age glaciers' movements. The underside is remarkably flat, and possibly split from another half, by the dolmen builders. The other half is a 19-tonne (21-ton) slab 2 km (1.2 mi) to the northwest, placed as a capstone on another dolmen, Agri Dyssen. How these slabs were transported and erected by Stone Age people is not known.

Apart from Denmark's easternmost island, Bornholm, the country has no bedrock. Therefore, large granite slabs have been sought out for construction purposes and many dolmens have disappeared or been damaged.

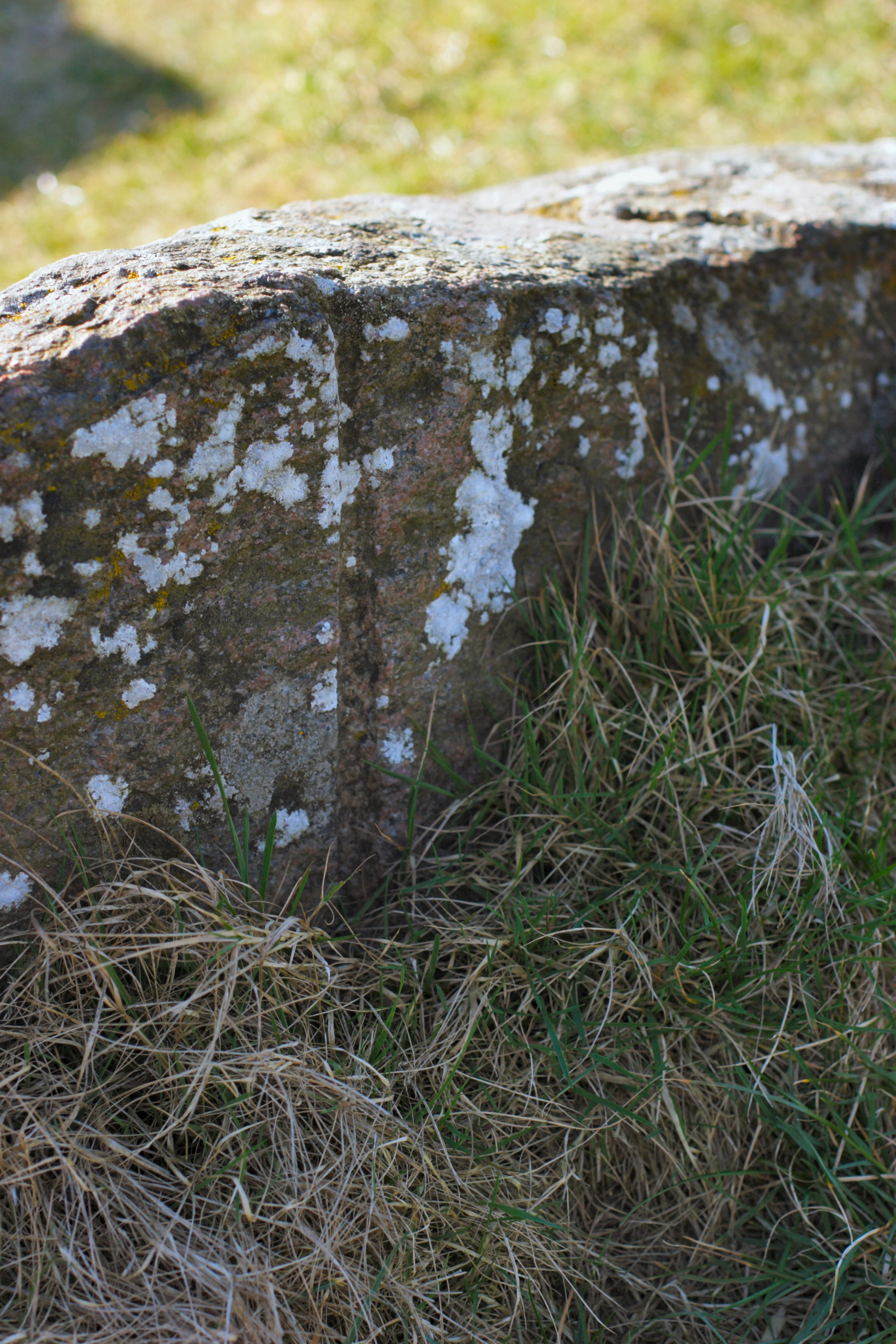
Dynamiting drill mark from Ole Hansen's attempt to convert the barrow to building blocks in 1859

In 1859 a landowner, Ole Hansen, attempted to dynamite slabs from Poskær Stenhus. A local priest started a process to stop the destruction of the burial site, ending with an official protection of the site in 1860. As part of this, Hansen was given a compensation of 100 rigsdaler. A broken slab-part with drill-marks from dynamiting at the barrow gives witness to his endeavor. At least one slab was destroyed before the site was protected.

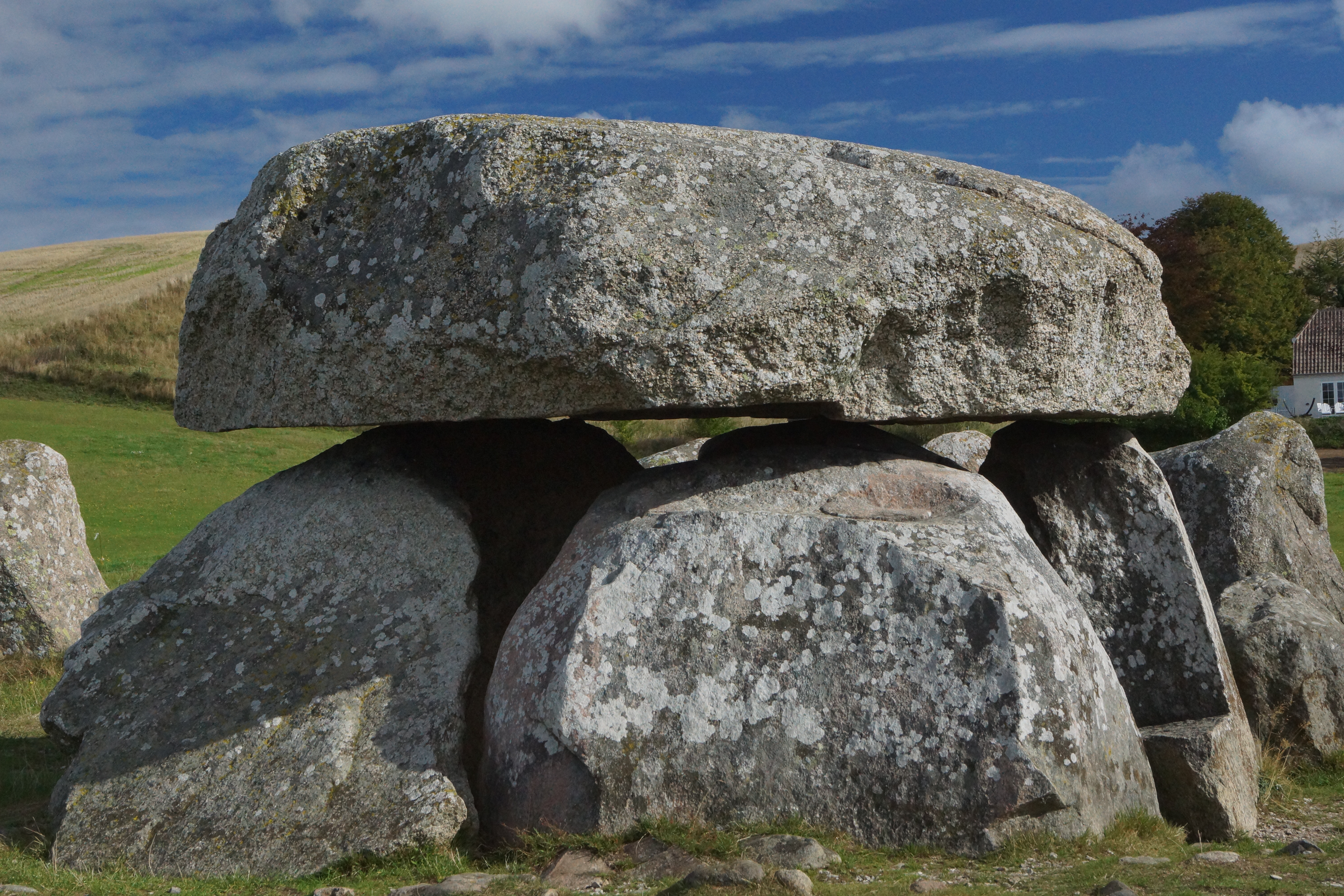
The 11-tonne capstone is part of an even larger stone that was split in two.

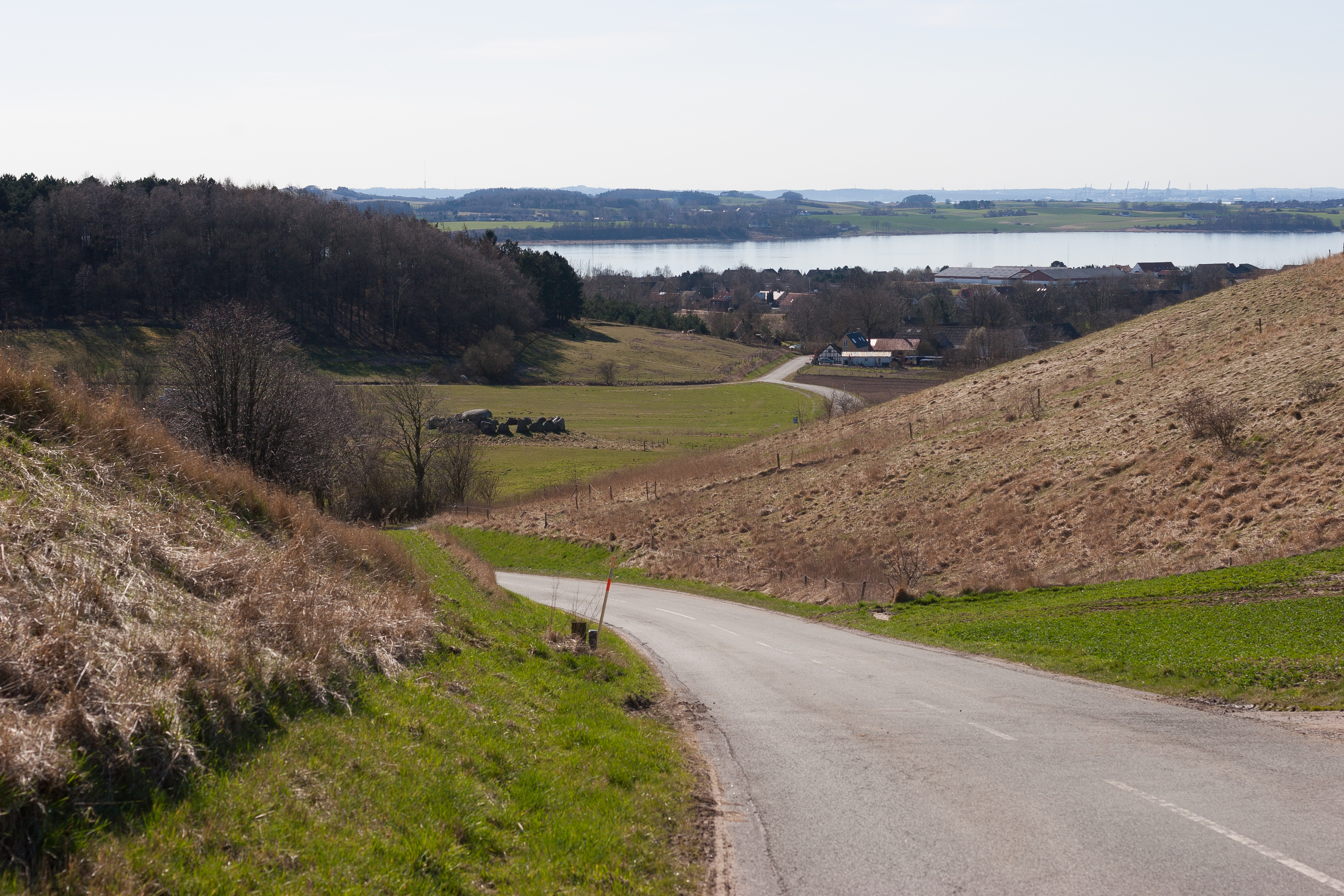
Road to Poskær from the village, Agri

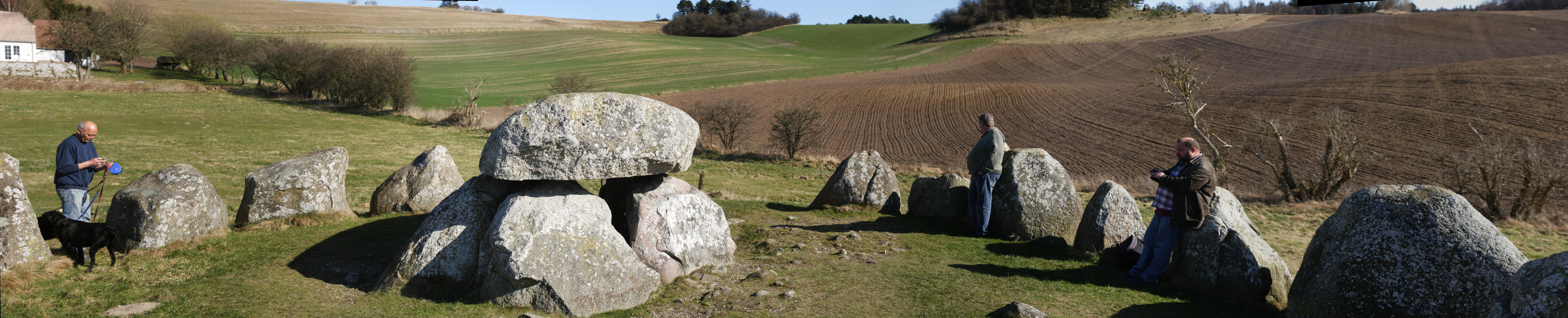
Panorama-photo, Poskær Stenhus

== Literature ==
- Palle Eriksen, Poskær Stenhus – myter og virkelighed, Moesgård Museum, 1999. ISBN 87-87334-34-8.
