= Galten Municipality =

Galten Municipality Galten Kommune
- Location within Denmark
- Coordinates: 56°09′23″N 9°54′18″E
- Country: Denmark
- County: Aarhus County
- Created: 1970
- Merged: 2007
- Seat: Galten

Area
  - Land: 72.73 km^{2} (28.08 sq mi)

Population (2005)
  - Total: 11,086
- Time zone: UTC1 (CET)
  - Summer (DST): UTC2 (CEST)

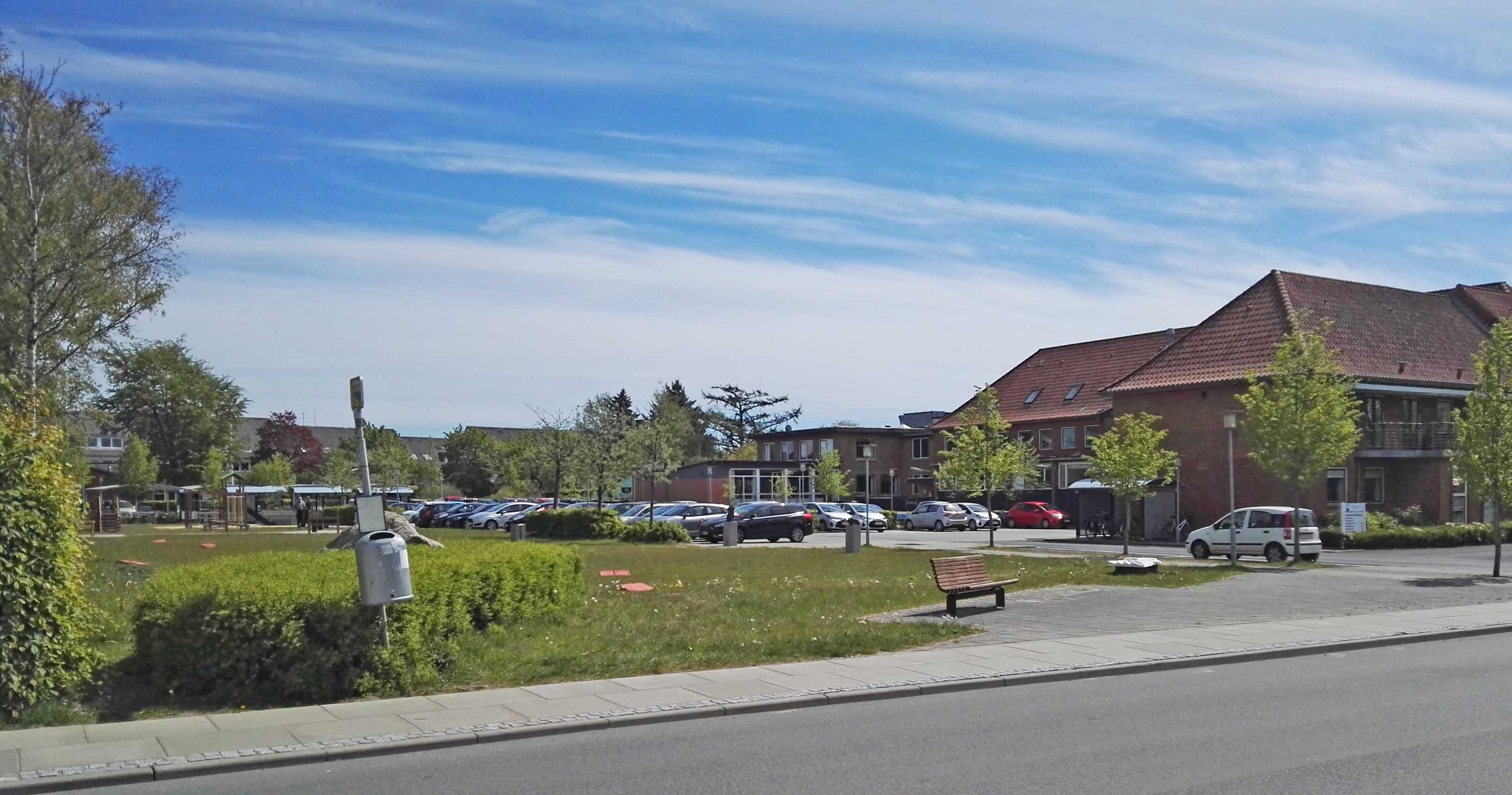
Galten in 2019

Until 1 January 2007 Galten municipality was a municipality (Danish, kommune) in Aarhus County in the eastern part of the Jutland peninsula in central Denmark. The municipality covered an area of 72.73 km^{2}, and had a total population of 11,086 (2005). Its last mayor was Jens Grønlund, a member of the Venstre (Liberal Party) political party. The site of its municipal council was the town of Galten.

The municipality was created in 1970 as the result of a kommunalreform ("Municipality Reform") that combined the following parishes: Galten, Sjelle, Skivholme, Skovby, Skørring, Stjær, and Storring parishes.

Galten municipality ceased to exist as the result of Kommunalreformen ("The Municipality Reform" of 2007). It was merged with existing Hørning, Ry, and Skanderborg municipalities to form the new Skanderborg municipality. This created a municipality with an area of 416 km^{2} and a total population of 49,469 (2005) in Region Midtjylland.
