= Hornslet wind-turbine collapse =

2008 wind turbine collapse

The Hornslet Wind Turbine Collapse was a collapse of a wind turbine on 22 February 2008.

It is one of only a few structural collapses that have been captured on film.

== Description of wind turbine ==
The wind turbine was a Nordtank NTK 600-180/43 with a maximum generation capacity of 600 kW at Hornslet, Denmark at 56°20′42.97″N 10°10′13.03″E. It was operated by Syddjurs and inaugurated on 23 December 1996. The rotor of this turbine, which carried in the Danish wind turbine register the designation 570715000000021503, had a diameter of 43 metres. It was mounted on a free-standing steel-tube tower 44.5 metres above ground.

The turbine was the first and northernmost turbine of Hyacintvej Wind Park, which consists of five similar wind turbines, arranged in a line running south-southeasterly - north-northwesterly.

== Failure ==
After a malfunction from a worn brake mechanism, a service team from Vestas were called. Vestas engineers checked and repaired the wind turbine brake on the morning of 22 February 2008. At the last routine inspection it was noted that the main gear of the turbine was also making unusual noises and a sophisticated endoscopic inspection of the gear was planned, but as result of its high cost it was not undertaken immediately.

After repair and several checks of the brake, the turbine was restarted in order to bring it back into normal operation. At this time the wind was very strong. The airbrakes at the tip of the blades were turned on to control the speed of the turbine before it reached operational speed. After its generator was synchronized to the grid a noise from the nacelle prompted an attempt to stop the turbine manually.

A large crashing sound occurred, possibly as a result of the gear failing, at which point the turbine began to oscillate strongly. The rotor then suddenly stopped but immediately started turning again. The rotor did not at first turn very fast, but it was now impossible to control the speed of rotation.

The tower was evacuated immediately, the airbrakes of the turbine had failed and as a strong wind blew the turbine started rotating faster and faster quickly reaching a speed far beyond its design tolerances. Service personnel contacted the police who established a security cordon of 400 metres around the turbine. 2.5 hours later, at about 3:20 pm, the blades began to disintegrate. One of the blades hit halfway along the tower which bent in the direction of the wind. The top half of the tower then sheared off at the bend and fell to the ground. The base of the tower remained standing. The debris of the turbine flew 200–500 metres away. No injuries were caused.

The collapse was filmed from a nearby farmhouse. The film was shown on several TV stations and is available online. The turbine was out of service until June 2008 and was eventually replaced by a new wind turbine of the same design.

== See also ==
- List of structural failures and collapses
