= Ebeltoft Municipality =

Former municipality in Aarhus, Denmark

Coordinates: 56°11′43″N 10°40′44″E

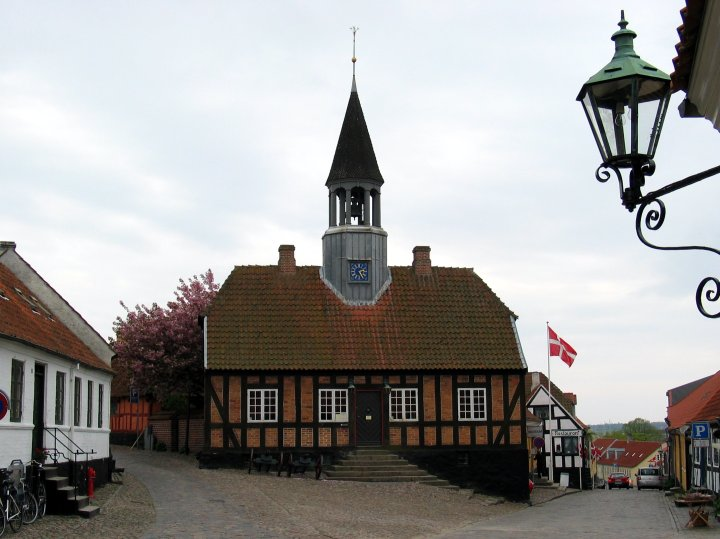
Ebeltoft Town Hall in the town of Ebeltoft, Denmark. Photo: ©2005 Hans Jørn Storgaard Andersen

Until 1 January 2007, Ebeltoft municipality was a municipality (Danish: kommune) in Aarhus County on the east coast of the Jutland peninsula in central Denmark. The region lies in a geographic region known as southern Djursland, and more specifically Mols. The municipality covered an area of 276 km^{2} (107 sq mi), and in 2003 had a total population of 14,997. Its last mayor was Jørgen Brøgger. The main town and the site of its municipal council was the town of Ebeltoft.

Ebeltoft municipality ceased to exist as the result of the municipality reform of 2007) (Danish: Kommunalreformen). It was merged with existing Midtdjurs, Rosenholm, and Rønde municipalities to form the new Syddjurs municipality. This created a municipality with an area of 693 km^{2} (268 sq mi) and a total population of 40,196 (2005). The new municipality belongs to Region Midtjylland ("Mid-Jutland Region").

== Facts about the former municipality ==
The municipality itself consisted of two smaller peninsulas that jut out into the surrounding waters, one to the south, and the other to the west. The southward peninsula, which contains the town of Ebeltoft, is surrounded on the east by Hjelm Deep, which separates the area from the small island of Hjelm off its eastern coast. To the west of this peninsula is Ebeltoft Cove (Ebeltoft Vig) which forms a bay between the southward peninsula and the headland formed to the south of the westward peninsula, Helge Headland (Helgenæs). To the west of Helge Headland is Aarhus Bay (Aarhus Bugt). To the northwest of the westward peninsula is Knebel Cove (Knebel Vig) and Kalø Cove (Kalø Vig).

The municipality also was home to Lake Stubbe (Stubbe Sø) and several high elevations. The Mols hills (Mols Bjerge), a high hilly moraine landscape, are protected as Mols Bjerge National Park. Some of the highest elevations in the area are Agri Bavnehøj at 137 m (449 ft), Trehøje at 127 m (417 ft), and Stabelhøjene at 135 and 133 m (443 and 436 ft) in height. The area has many burial mounds, stone monuments and graves, including Denmark's largest stone burial chamber, the 2,000-year old Porskær Stenhus near the town of Knebel.

The municipality was created in 1970 due to a "municipality reform" (kommunalreform) that combined the following parishes: Agri, Dråby, Ebeltoft, Egens, Fuglslev, Helgenæs, Hyllested, Knebel, Rolsø, Rosmus, Tirstrup, Tved, and Vistoft.

== The area known as Mols ==
Mols is an area in the southern part of Djursland on Jutland's east coast, with Ebeltoft as its main city. The residents of this area are known as Molboere (lit. 'Mols residents'). There have been many fictional accounts written about the stupidity of these people, referred to as Molbohistorier (lit. 'Stories of the Mols residents').

== The town of Ebeltoft ==
Ebeltoft was granted its municipal charter in 1301. The town has many well-preserved half-timbered houses and cobbled streets.

Among the town's highlights are the frigate Jylland (Fregatten Jylland), the zoo, the museum, and the glass museum (Glasmuseet Ebeltoft).

- The Jylland was launched in 1860, and served as both royal yacht and battleship before it was reduced to a barracks ship in 1892. The ship has had a 10-year restoration.
- The glass museum houses a large collection of contemporary glass from all over the world.

== Other attractions ==
- Sletterhage Lighthouse at the southernmost point on Helgenæs
- Kalø Castle ruins (Kalø Slotsruin)
