= Hørning Municipality =

Former municipality in Denmark

Coordinates: 56°05′06″N 10°02′08″E

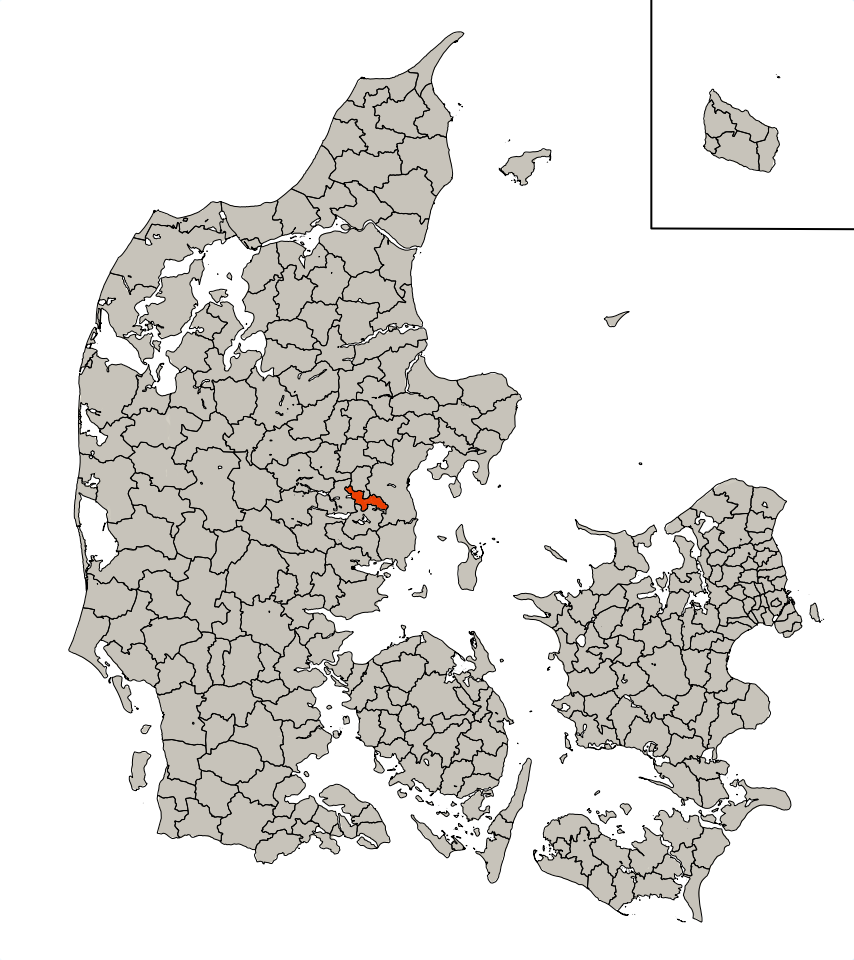
Hørning Municipality's location in Denmark

Until 1 January 2007, Hørning municipality was a municipality (Danish: kommune) in Aarhus County on the Jutland peninsula in central Denmark. The municipality covered an area of 67.71 km^{2}, and had a total population of 8,688 (2005). Its last mayor was Søren Erik Pedersen, a member of Venstre. The main town and the site of its municipal council was the town of Hørning.

Hørning municipality ceased to exist as the result of the Municipal Reform of 2007. It was merged with existing Galten, Ry, and Skanderborg municipalities to form the new Skanderborg municipality. This created a municipality with an area of 416 km^{2} and a total population of 49,469 (2005). The new municipality belongs to Region Midtjylland ("Mid-Jutland Region").
