= Aarhus County =

Aarhus County Århus Amt (Danish)
- County
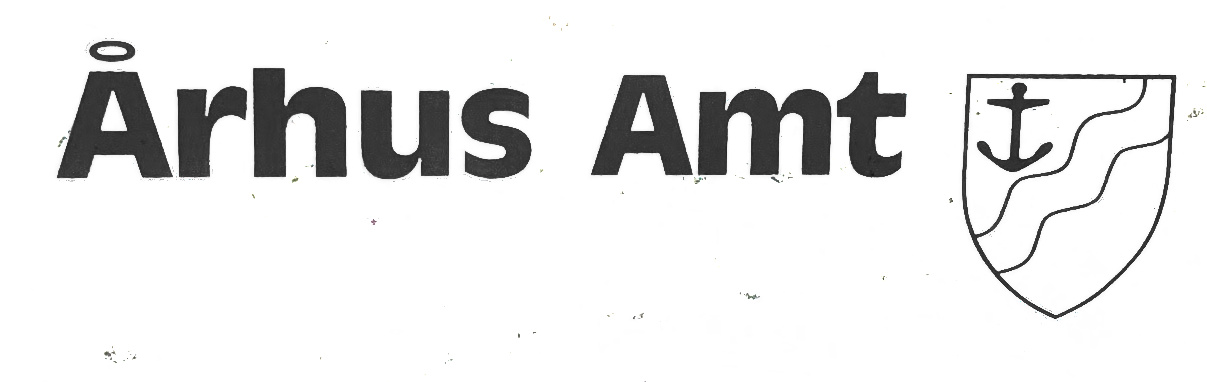
- Coat of arms Logo

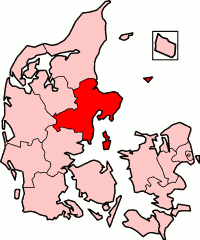
- Aarhus County in Denmark
- Coordinates: 56.15°N 10.20°E
- Country: Denmark
- Seat: Århus

Area
  - Total: 4,561 km^{2} (1,761 sq mi)

Population (2006)
  - Total: 661,370
  - Density: 145.0/km^{2} (375.6/sq mi)

Aarhus County or Århus County (Danish: Århus Amt) is a former county of Denmark (Danish: amt) on the Jutland peninsula. It was created in 1970 by a merger of three counties: Århus, Randers and Skanderborg. The county was abolished effective 1 January 2007, when almost all of it merged into Region Midtjylland (i.e. Region Central Jutland). A very small portion was merged into Region Nordjylland (Region North Jutland). At the time of its abolishment, more than 20,000 people worked for the county.

== Municipalities (1970–2006) ==
- Aarhus municipality
- Ebeltoft municipality
- Galten municipality
- Gjern municipality
- Grenaa municipality
- Hadsten municipality
- Hammel municipality
- Hinnerup municipality
- Hørning municipality
- Langå municipality
- Mariager municipality
- Midtdjurs municipality
- Nørhald municipality
- Nørre Djurs municipality
- Odder municipality
- Purhus municipality
- Randers municipality
- Rosenholm municipality
- Rougsø municipality
- Ry municipality
- Rønde municipality
- Samsø municipality
- Silkeborg municipality
- Skanderborg municipality
- Sønderhald municipality
- Them municipality
