= Ry Municipality =

Former municipality in Denmark

Coordinates: 56°05′25″N 9°45′48″E

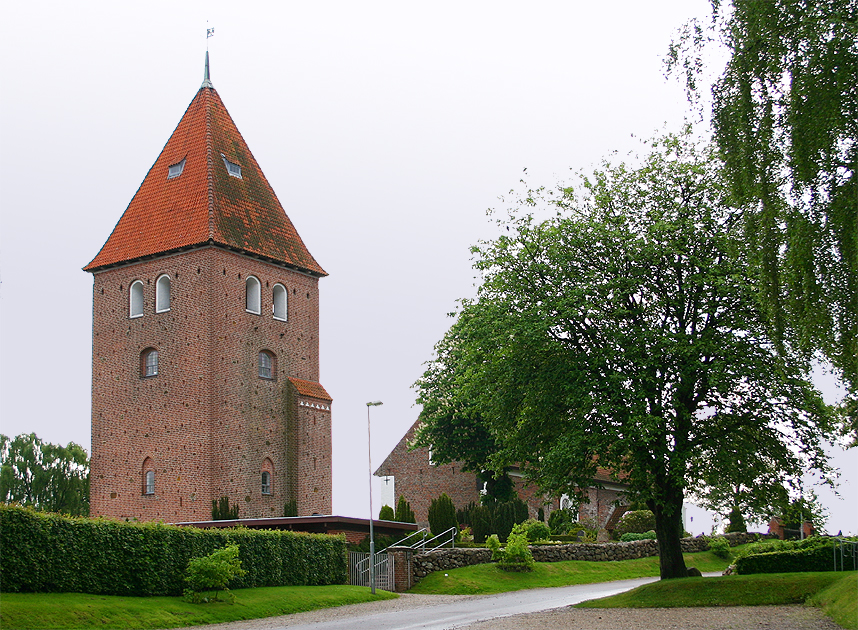
St. Søren's Church (Sankt Sørens kirke) in Old Rye, Denmark (2005). Photo by Malene Thyssen,

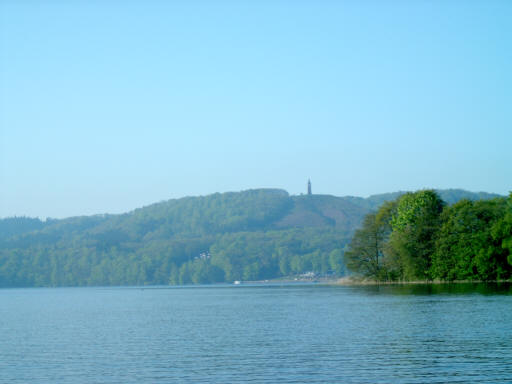
A view of Himmelbjerget near the town of Ry seen over Juulsø (2005). Photo by Lars Helbo.

Until 1 January 2007 Ry municipality was a municipality (Danish, kommune) in the former Aarhus County on the Jutland peninsula in central Denmark. The municipality covered an area of 152.44 km^{2}, and had a total population of 11,244 (2005). Its last mayor was Jonna Grønver, a member of the Venstre (Liberal Party) political party. The main town and the site of its municipal council was the town of Ry.

The municipality was created in 1970 as the result of a kommunalreform ("Municipality Reform") that merged a number of existing parishes:

- Alling Parish
- Dover Parish
- Gammel Rye Parish
- Låsby Parish
- RyParish
- Tulstrup Parish

Ry municipality ceased to exist as the result of Kommunalreformen ("The Municipality Reform" of 2007). It was merged with Galten, Hørning, and Skanderborg municipalities to form the new Skanderborg municipality. This created a municipality with an area of 416 km^{2} and a total population of 49,469 (2005).

== The towns of the former municipality ==
Ry, also known as Ry Station, is located between the lakes of Gudensø, Juulsø and Knudsø along the Guden River (Gudenå). It is a relatively new town that developed around the railroad tracks. The original town in the area is now known as Old Rye (Gammel Rye).

Old Rye is located 3 km west of Rye. During the Middle Ages it was one of the most important towns in the area. It had the royal status and privileges of being a merchant town, and is thus named in 1536. Starting in the 15th century until 1687, Old Rye was an area Court of Justice.

The town had a major impact on Danish history in 1534, when King Christian III was chosen there. Denmark was attacked by Lübeck when Frederik I died in 1533. This led to the three-year civil war fought between 1534 and 1536 called The Count's Feud (Grevens fejde), which ushered in the Danish Reformation.

The town's location at the crossroads for traffic between East Jutland and West Jutland, along with the royal glass production facility in nearby Glarbo until ca. 1600, have helped secure the town's position in the years after the Reformation. There is mention in 1553 of a royal coach maker in the area, and there used to be a royal hunting lodge in the area, but it was torn down in 1617. The town has suffered fire several times, f. ex. 1613, 1618 and 1660.

St. Søren's Church in Old Rye is at the site of a holy spring, and has had the reputation for bringing about miracles. In the Middle Ages many pilgrimages were made here. It is here that King Christian III was chosen in 1534. From 1579 a market was held on the site on the saint's day. According to legend, St. Søren was a local farmer who became a bishop in Cologne.

In the 19th century Old Rye became a center for the production of wooden shoes, and today there is a Wooden Shoe Museum located at the site of a historic windmill (1872) in the town.

With the establishment of the railroad from Skanderborg to Silkeborg in 1871, the area's growth, however, became centered on the station town Ry.

Låsby can trace its origin to Viking times.

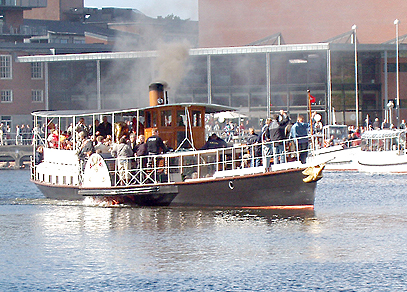
Hjejlen ("The Golden Plover") is a historic steamboat that sails from Silkeborg to Himmelbjerget.

== Other attractions ==
Himmelbjerget (affectionately translated as "Heaven Mountain"), located in the former municipality, is one of the highest points of elevation in Denmark at 147 meters. The high hill is a popular destination for its beautiful nature and magnificent views. One can sail to Himmelbjerget from Ry, or from Silkeborg on the historic steamship Hjejlen ("The Golden Plover").

On top of the hill is a 25-meter-tall (82 ft) tower that was erected to honor King Frederik VII and his role in giving the Danish people a constitution in 1849. Close to the top are more monuments, most honoring individuals, but also one to commemorate women's right to vote in 1915.

The Hotel Himmelbjerget, formerly Hotel Julsø, is the highest located hotel in Denmark, and displays historic memorabilia from the area. It used to house a museum dedicated to Jodle Birge, Danish country-western entertainer.

To the east of Old Rye is a ca. 23 hectares conservation area of heather-covered hills and oak scrub. There is also Gallows Hill, the site of beheadings during the times when Court was held in Ry.

Nearby Mossø is Denmark's second largest lake.
