= Rosenholm Municipality =

Former municipality in Denmark

Coordinates: 56°19′00″N 10°19′02″E

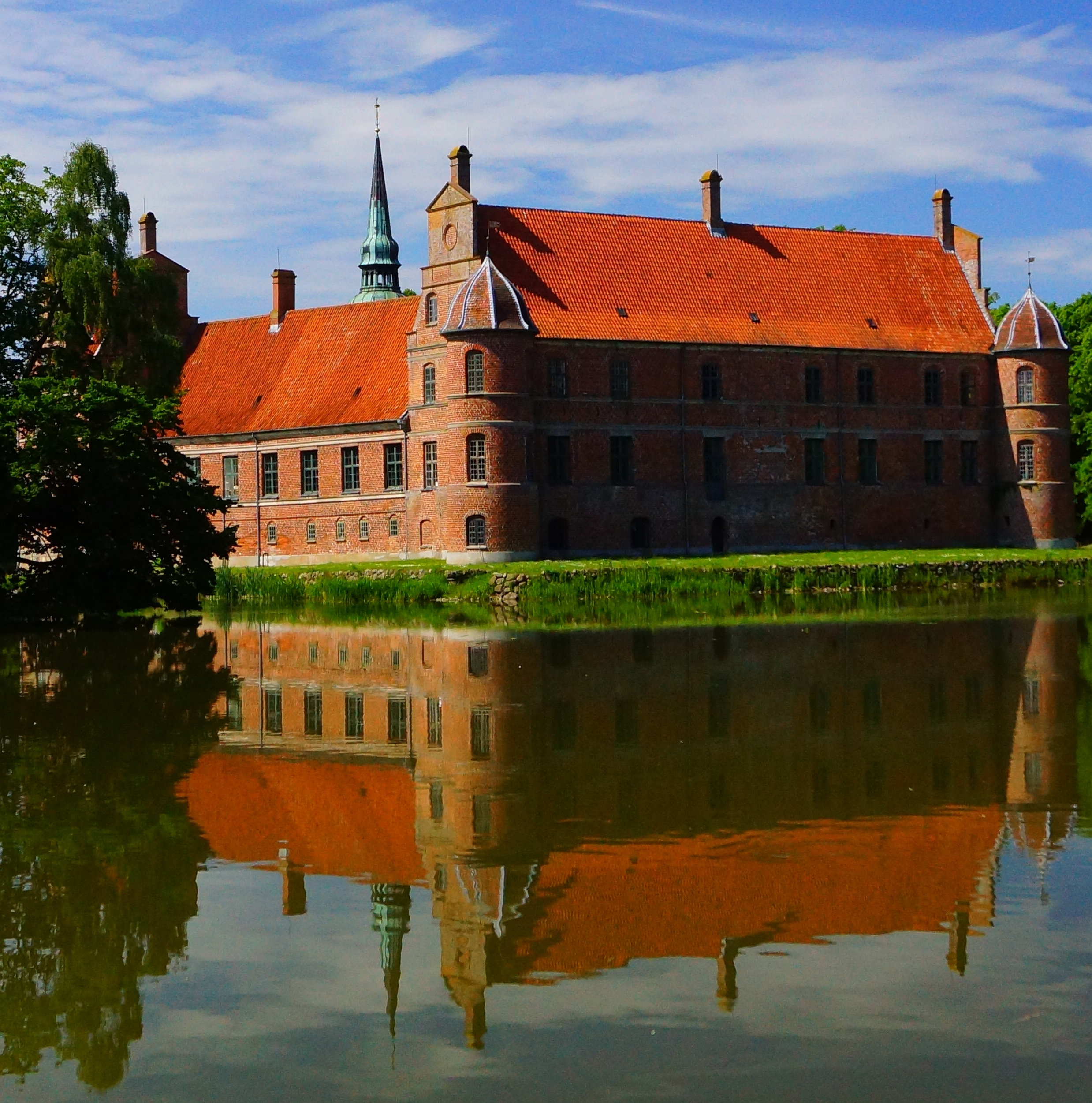
Rosenholm Castle in Rosenholm Municipality, Denmark.

Until 1 January 2007 Rosenholm municipality was a municipality (Danish, kommune) in the former Aarhus County on the east coast of the Jutland peninsula in central Denmark just north of Aarhus and is more or less a suburb today. The municipality covered an area of 141 km^{2}, and had a total population of 10.325 (2005). Its last mayor was Richard Volander, a member of the Venstre (Liberal Party) political party. The main town and the site of its municipal council was the town of Hornslet.

Rosenholm municipality ceased to exist as the result of Kommunalreformen ("The Municipality Reform" of 2007). It was merged with Ebeltoft, Midtdjurs, and Rønde municipalities to form the new Syddjurs municipality. This created a municipality with an area of 693 km^{2} and a total population of 40,196 (2005). The new municipality belongs to Region Midtjylland ("Mid-Jutland Region").

== Attractions ==
- Rosenholm Castle
