= Prakash Reddy =

Indian anthropologist

G. Prakash Reddy
- Born: 1940 (age 85–86)
- Education: Andhra University
- Occupation: Anthropologist
- Known for: Danes are like that! Perspectives of an Indian Anthropologist on the Danish Society
- Scientific career
- Workplaces: Andhra University; Sri Venkateswara University

G. Prakash Reddy is an Indian anthropologist who specializes in studying villages, both in India and in Denmark.

== India ==
Reddy studied Indian villages and tribal communities, including the hunting and gathering and horticultural communities of the Andaman and Nicobar Islands.

== Denmark ==
Reddy's observations during his stay in the village of Hvilsager in East Jutland around 1990 have been the basis for several of his publications, in particular the book Sådan er danskerne! En indisk antropologs perspektiv på det danske samfund., published in 1991 by Grevas, which was translated in English as Danes are like that! Perspectives of an Indian Anthropologist on the Danish Society. His field work was the subject of the documentary film Brev til Indien (Letter to India). This work was published academically as Research processen in cross-cultural context : an indian anthropologist looks at a Danish village community in 1990. In 1997, he published "Har du været på højskole?" : en indisk antropolog ser på et mini-Danmark ("Have you been to high school? ": An Indian anthropologist looks at a mini-Denmark) with Poul Pedersen, and in 1998 Danske dilemmaer, translated in English as Danish dilemmas : perspectives of an Indian anthropologist on values in Danish society. He also contributed to Foreningslivet i Danmark : nye vilkår i en zappertid og Danskere : 17 tanker om danskere og danskheden. His work was covered by the mainstream press at the time as well as by the specialised press, and has entered Danish culture.
