= Midtdjurs Municipality =

Former municipality in Denmark

Coordinates: 56°21′38″N 10°34′57″E

Until 1 January 2007 Midtdjurs ("Central Djursland") was a municipality (Danish, kommune) in the former Aarhus County on the Jutland peninsula in central Denmark. The municipality, in the middle of a region known as Djursland, covered an area of 179 km^{2}, and had a total population of 7.763 (2005). Its last mayor was Kim Dalgaard Poulsen, a member of the Venstre (Liberal Party) political party. The main town and the site of its municipal council was the town of Kolind.

The municipality was created in 1970 due to a kommunalreform ("Municipality Reform") that combined a number of existing parishes: Ebdrup, Koed, Koling, Marie Magdalene, Nimtofte, Nødager, Skarresø, and Tøstrup parishes.

Midtdjurs municipality ceased to exist, as the result of Kommunalreformen ("The Municipality Reform" of 2007). It was merged with existing Ebeltoft, Rosenholm, and Rønde municipalities to form the new Syddjurs municipality. This created a municipality with an area of 693 km^{2} and a total population of 40,196 (2005). The new municipality belongs to Region Midtjylland ("Mid-Jutland Region").
