= Knebel, Denmark =

Knebel
- Village
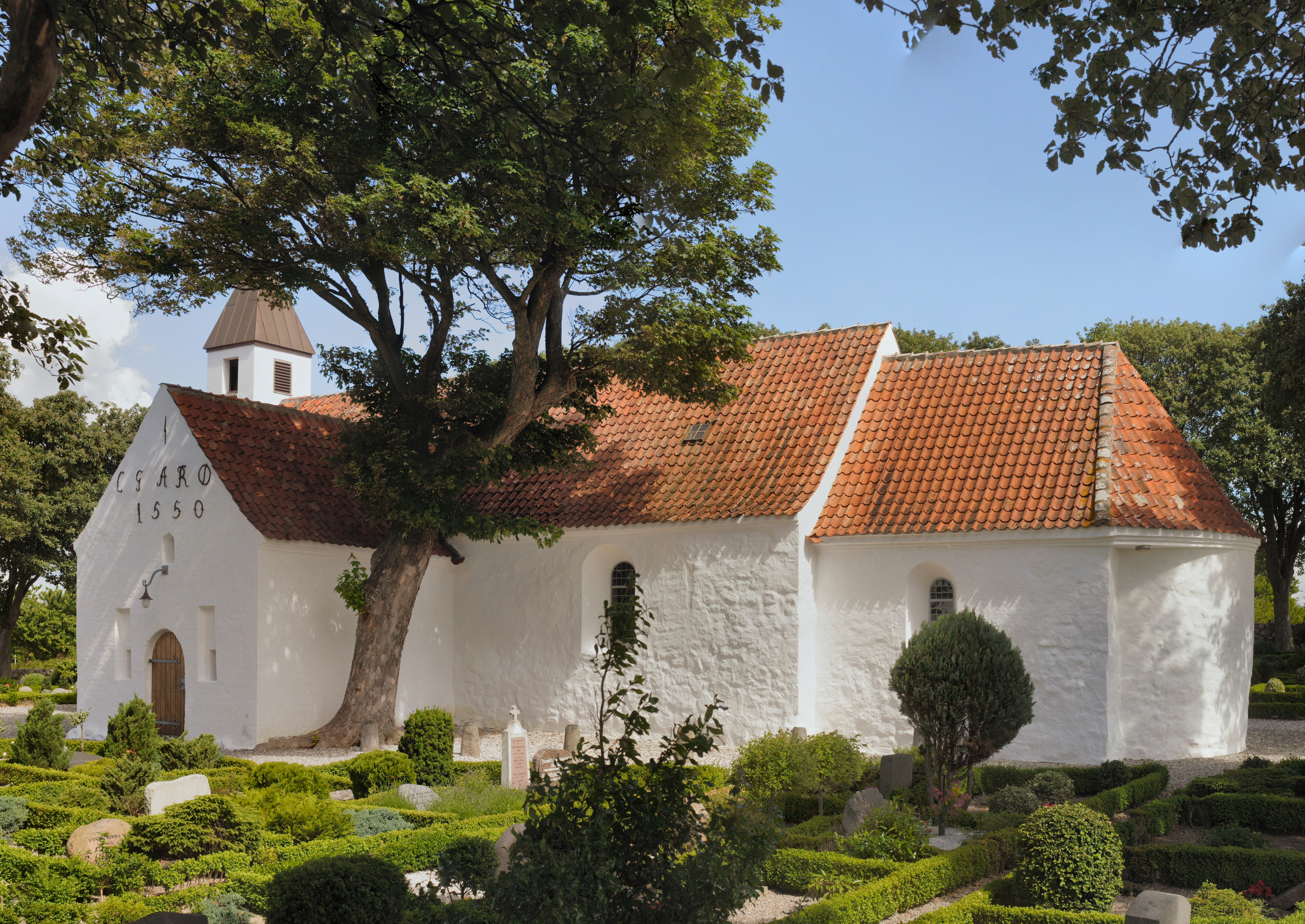
- Knebel church

- Location within Denmark Location within Central Denmark Region
- Coordinates: 56°12′49″N 10°29′14″E
- Country: Denmark
- Region: Central Denmark (Midtjylland)
- Municipality: Syddjurs

Population (2026)
  - Total: 667
- Time zone: UTC+1 (Central European Time)
  - Summer (DST): UTC+2 (Central European Summer Time)

Knebel is a village in Syddjurs Municipality, Denmark.

Poskær Stenhus, the largest round barrow in Denmark, is located 1 km east of the village.
