= Nimtofte =

- Village
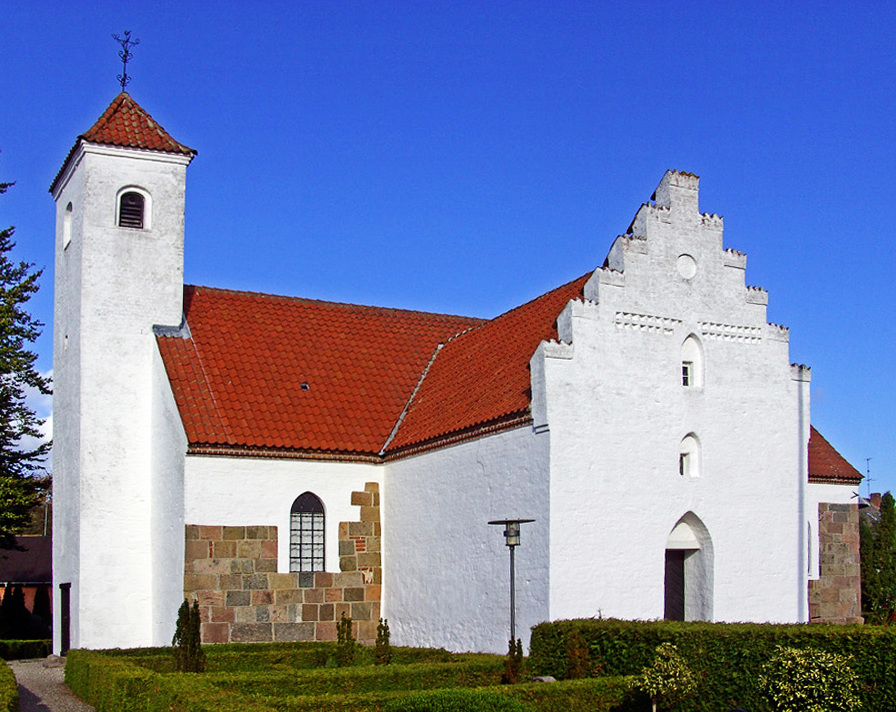
- Nimtofte Church

- Location in Denmark Nimtofte (Denmark)
- Coordinates: 56°24′32″N 10°34′1″E
- Country: Denmark
- Region: Central Denmark (Midtjylland)
- Municipality: Syddjurs Municipality

Population (2026)
  - Total: 572

Nimtofte is a village, with a population of 572 (1 January 2026), in Syddjurs Municipality, Central Denmark Region in Denmark. It is located 6 km northeast of Ryomgård, 37 km east of Randers, 23 km west of Grenaa and 29 km north of Ebeltoft.

Nimtofte Church is located in the village.
