= Nordjyllands Trafikselskab =

Logo of Nordjyllands Trafikselskab

Nordjyllands Trafikselskab (English: North Jutland's Transport Company. Often abridged to NT) is a traffic company, that covers the North Denmark Region.

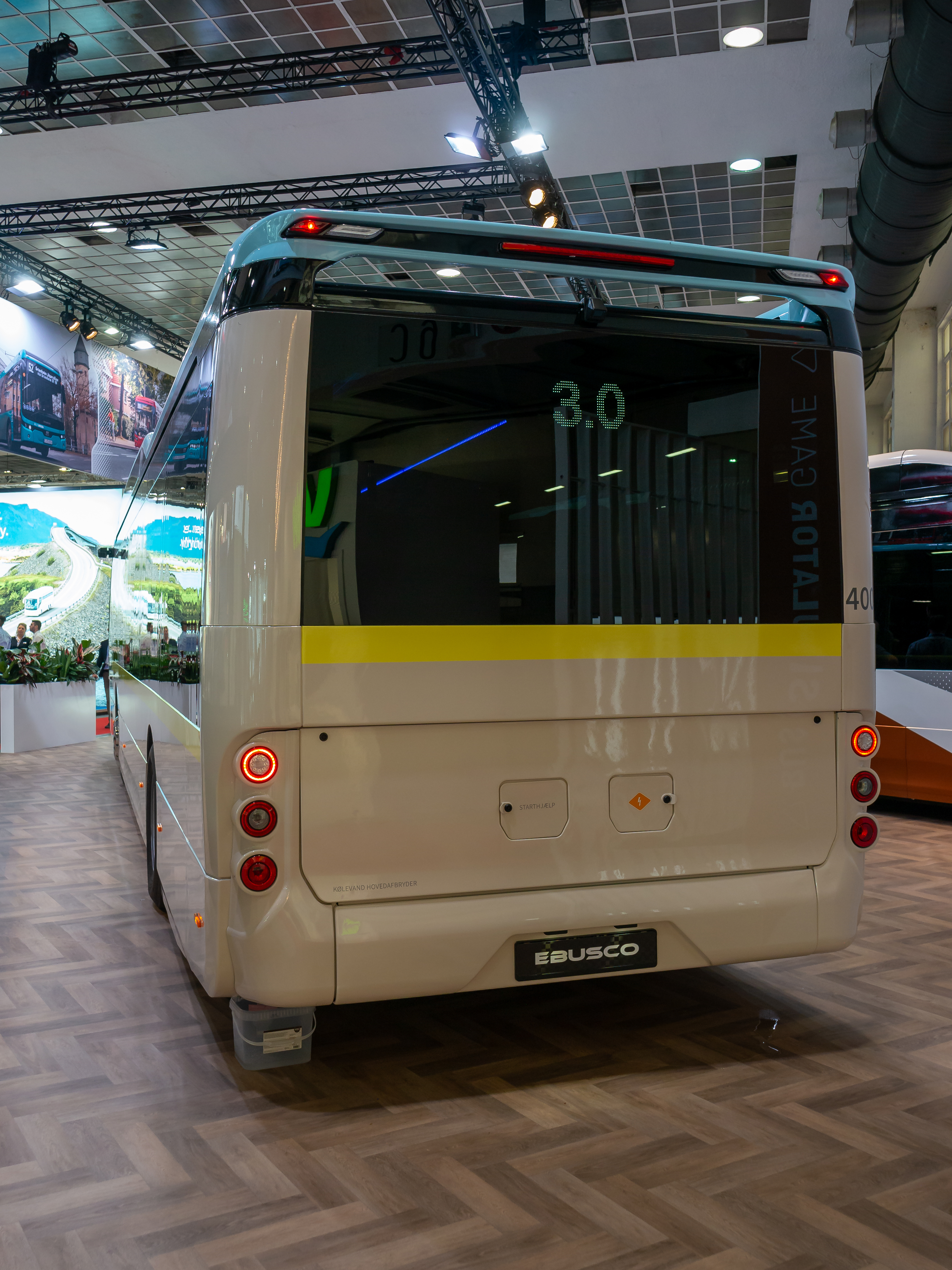
Eubusco 3.0 for Nordjyllands Trafikselskab

NT was created following the Danish structure reform in 2007. It took over the tasks and the name from the former traffic company, that was under control by North Jutland County. The main task is to maintain bus traffic and public taxiing in North Denmark Region.

NT makes the routes of the regional buses (drives through several communes), city buses and Nordjyske Jernbaner (North Jut Railways). Although, Aalborg Kommune makes the schedules for the city buses in the city on their own.

The operation of the buses itself is outsourced to private entrepreneurs. In Aalborg the entrepreneurs is Arriva and City-Trafik.

NT owns stocks in Nordjyske Jernbaner, Rejseplanen A/S and Rejsekortet A/S.
