= Rønde Municipality =

Former municipality of Denmark

Coordinates: 56°18′01″N 10°28′34″E

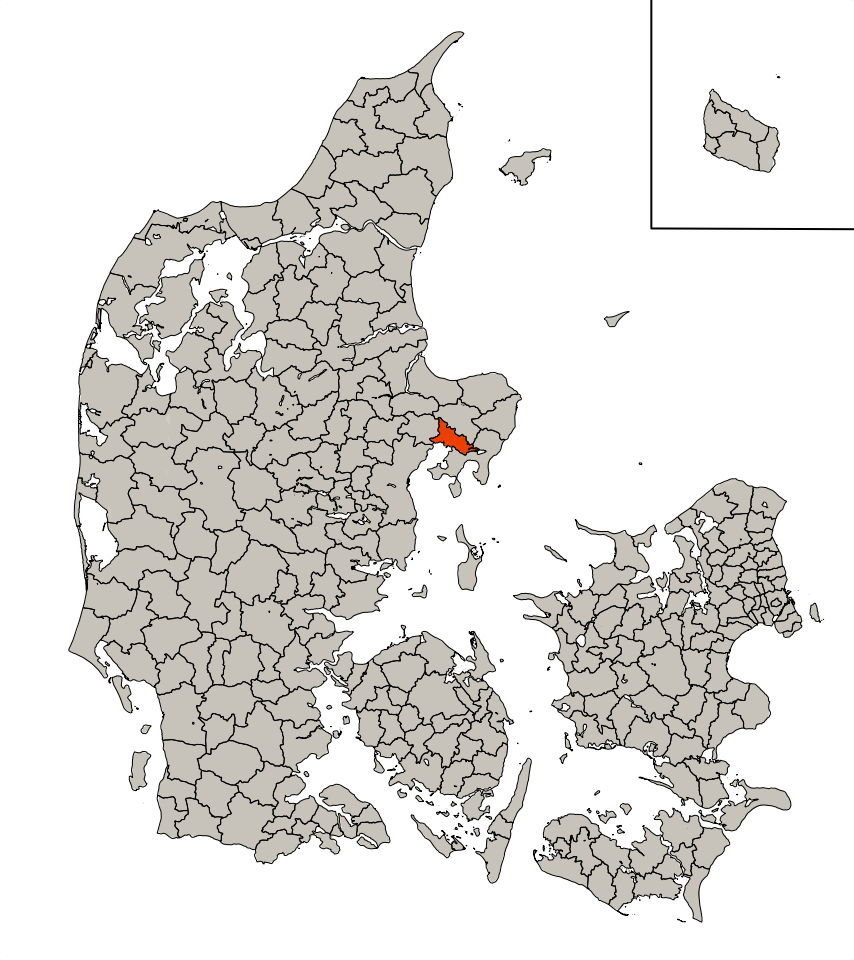

Until 1 January 2007 Rønde municipality was a municipality (Danish, kommune) in the former Aarhus County on the east coast of the Jutland peninsula in central Denmark. The municipality covered an area of 101 km^{2}, and had a total population of 7,111 (2005). Its last mayor was Vilfred Friborg Hansen, a member of the Social Democrats (Socialdemokraterne) political party. The main town and the site of its municipal council was the town of Rønde.

The municipality was created in 1970 as the result of a kommunalreform ("Municipality Reform") that merged a number of existing parishes:

- Bregnet Parish
- Feldballe Parish
- Thorsager Parish

Rønde municipality ceased to exist as the result of Kommunalreformen ("The Municipality Reform" of 2007). It was merged with Ebeltoft, Midtdjurs, and Rosenholm municipalities to form the new Syddjurs municipality. This created a municipality with an area of 693 km^{2} and a total population of 40,196 (2005). The new municipality belongs to Region Midtjylland ("Mid-Jutland Region").
