= Djurs Sommerland =

Amusement park in Djurland, Denmark

- Interactive map of Djurs Sommerland
- Location: Randersvej 17, Battrupholt, 8581, Nimtofte, Denmark
- Coordinates: 56°25′33.36″N 10°33′2.03″E
- Status: Operating
- Public transit: Djurs Sommerland, Midttrafik seasonal line 400.; Nimtofte, Midttrafik line 214.; Ryomgård, Aarhus Light Rail
- Opened: 1981
- Slogan: Vi elsker legebørn ("We love playful children")
- Operating season: April–August and mid-October (Occasional outside the main seasons)
- Area: 33 ha (82 acres)

Attractions
- Total: 60 +
- Roller coasters: 8
- Water rides: 4
- Website: www.djurssommerland.dk/en

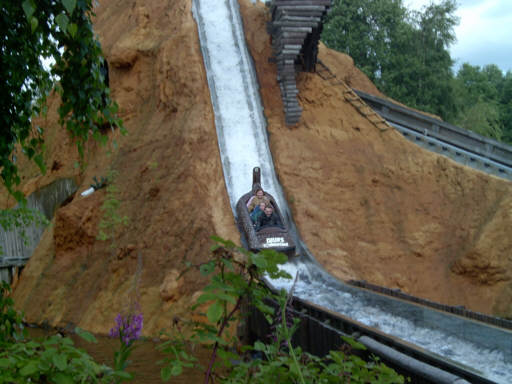
Colorado River ride in Djurs Sommerland

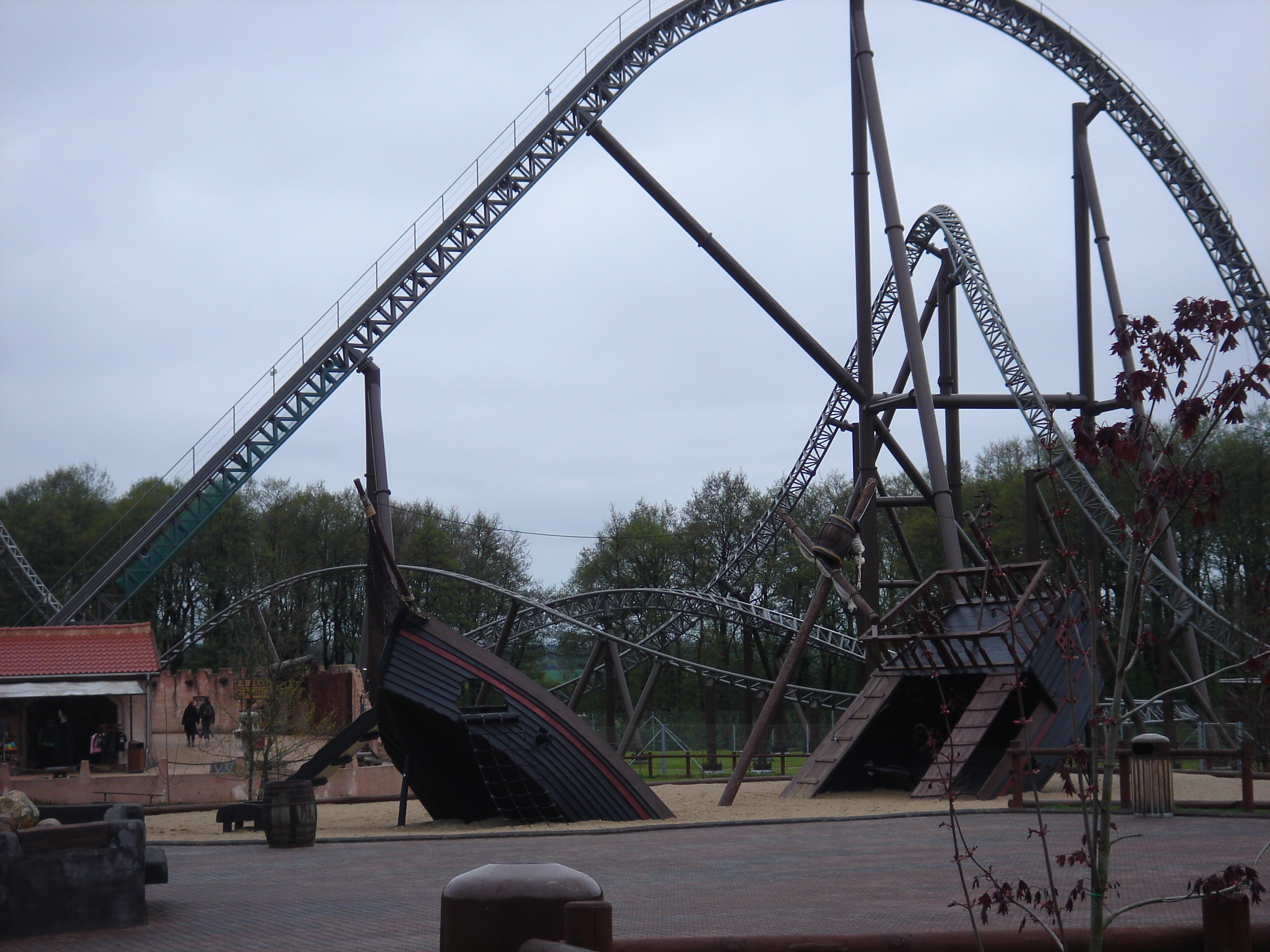
Piraten in Djurs Sommerland

Djurs Sommerland (English: Djurs Summer Land) is an amusement park located in Djursland, Denmark, just north of the village of Nimtofte, 23 kilometers west of Grenaa, and 36 kilometers east of Randers.

The park opened in 1981, and it has progressively expanded every year since then. Its guests mostly consist of families, as most of the rides are aimed at kids and teenagers. Because of this, the park has been very adaptive in making rides accessible for most heights and ages. The park is, as suggested in the name, predominantly open in the summer, with the recent addition of special Halloween opening days in October. The season begins around May and lasts until mid-October. Djurs Sommerland has had around 800,000 annual visitors in recent years, making the park the fifth largest tourist attraction in Denmark.

== History ==
Djurs Sommerland was established by the hotelier Børge Godsk Jensen and music agent Ole B. Nielsen. They chose the popular vacation spot of Jylland as location for the park. The park has grown in popularity over the years and has added many rides since opening. The park is now operated by Nielsen's sons Henrik and Michael.

A new attraction, Piraten, was opened in 2008. It held the title of fastest roller coaster in Denmark until 2022 when a coaster in Fårup Sommerland named "Fønix" took the record for height and speed. This changed a lot of press for the park, as it got massive media attention and made Djurs Sommerland a must visit destination for tourists. Its top speed is 90 km/h (56 mph) and maximum height above ground is 31 meters (102 ft). Immediately after opening, the coaster was chosen as the fifth best roller coaster in the world.

The current CEO of the park is Henrik B. Nielsen.

== The park ==
The park is divided into 8 areas; all are included in the admission price:

- Sommerland is the park's original area that opened in 1981; over the years many of its rides have been removed while others have been added.
- Bondegårdsland is an area with 11 rides themed after life at a farm. The rides are for the whole family including the smallest children.
- Westernland has a replica of an old Texas Wild West town where cowboys roam the streets; there is also a play area where kids can play Indians. The main attraction in this land is the Rio Grande Rafting.
- Mexicoland has a miniature golf course. The main attractions is the double-launch coaster Juvelen, and the drop tower El Grito.
- Piratland opened in 2008. It has a pirate theme and three of the park's most exciting rides: Piraten, Skatteøen and The Piranha flume ride.
- Vandland is a water park that opened in 1986 and was the first of its kind in Denmark at the time.
- Vikingeland is a small area in the further back of the park with a few kiddie rides and one Gerstlauer coaster named Thor's Hammer.
- Dinosaurland is a dinosaur-themed area opened in 2022. The main attractions are Spinosaurus, Jeep Safari and T-Rex Family Coaster.

=== Roller coasters ===
| Ride name | Type | Opened in | Manufacturer | Themed land | Additional informations |
|---|---|---|---|---|---|
| Piraten | Steel sit down | 2008 | Intamin | Piratland | Reaches a speed of 90 km/h on a 2477 ft long track (755 m) and a height of 101.7 ft (31 m); height limit 1.4 m. Mega-Lite model, train 2×8. |
| Skatteøen | Steel sit down | 2011 | Mack Rides | Piratland | A pirate-themed water coaster that travels a 455-meter-long course at 70 km/h and ends in a 28-meter-high fall into a pool of water; height limit 1.1 m. Water Coaster model. |
| Thor's Hammer | Steel sit down | 2002 | Gerstlauer | Vikingeland | Reaches a speed of 36 mph (60 km/h) on a 1575 ft long track (480 m) and a height of 53 ft (16 m); height limit 1m / 1.3 m alone. Bobsled model 480/4, car 2+2. |
| Juvelen | Steel sit down | 2013 | Intamin | Mexicoland | Motorbike roller coaster which reaches a top speed of 52.8 miles per hour (85.0 km/h) along a 3,280.8-foot-long (1,000.0 m) track. |
| Den Vilde Hønsejagt | Steel family | 2015 | Zierer | Bondegårdsland | |
| DrageKongen | Steel inverted | 2017 | Intamin | Wild Asia | |
| Jungle Rally | Steel family | 2018 | Zierer | Wild Asia | |
| T-Rex Family Coaster | Steel Powered | 2022 | Mack Rides | Dinosaur Land | |

=== Water rides ===
- Long Cun Expedition - a log flume ride that opened in 1991, located in Wild Asia. A themed river adventure on a 370-meter-long (1,210 ft) course that has 3 drops, the highest of which is 11 meters tall. Interlink.
- Piratfisken - a log flume ride that opened in 2009, located in Piratland. A family-style ride that is 150 meters long and ends in a 5-meter-tall (16 ft) drop. ABC Rides.
- Rio Grande Rafting - river rapids ride that opened in 1998, located in Westernland. A 6-passenger raft that travels a 500-meter-long (1,600 ft) course with a tunnel, water effects and an Indian village on the way. Interlink.

=== Thrill rides ===
- El Grito - A 60-metre (200 ft) tall Funtime drop tower that opened in 2024.
- Tigeren - An Intamin Gyro Swing pendulum ride that opened in 2018.
- SpinOsaurus - A Disk'O swing on a track that opened in 2023.

=== Family rides ===
- Andedammen - join the duck family for a relaxing tour around the pond.
- Bondegårdskarrusellen - join all the animals of the farm in this merry-go-round.
- Buffalo Bumper Cars - bumper cars that opened in 2012 in Westernland. Bertazzon.
- Den Vilde Hønsejagt - chase the hens with the fox in a roller coaster.
- Det Gamle Vandtårn - a 12-meter high tower with a free fall.
- Det Nye Vandtårn - help the farmer check if the new tower has been painted before the free fall.
- Det Skøre Kompas - Rockin' Tug Kontiki in Piratland. Zierer.
- Djurs Expressen - railroad journey in Sommerland.
- Drageskibet - pirate ship ride in Vikingeland.
- Edderkoppenettet - climbing zone of ropes in Sommerland.
- Family bicycles - bicycling course in Sommerland.
- Frøerne - jump along with crazy frogs.
- Gold-diggers - pan for gold in Westernland.
- Junglesti - obstacle zone in Vikingeland.
- Fossilvaskeren - spinning cups in Dinosaurland. Mack Rides.
- Klatrebjerget - climbing mountain and slide in Sommarland.
- Kornmøllen - ride the bikes and help the farmer grind his harvest.
- Milkshakeren - join the cows in the barn on this spinning and shaken ride, where milk is turned into milkshake.
- Mexicana Golf - mini golf in Mexicoland.
- Motorbike Derby - Spinning flat ride that has guests control the uplift and speed of the experience.
- Piratlegeplads - play zone themed on a pirate ship in Piratland.
- Rodeotyrene - the bulls are chasing each other as they have bullseyes painted on their behind.
- Safaribussen - flat ride located in Wild Asia.
- Solguden - flying fish ride with an Aztec theme that opened in 2012 in Mexicoland. Zierer.
- Søulken - is a Polyp model with unlocked cart rotation.
- Speedy Gonzales - water dinghy ride in Mexicoland. Metallbau Emmeln.
- Traktorerne - a ride in your own tractor in farmland.
- Water bikes and canoes - canoes / pedal boats on a lake in Sommerland. Must be 1.2 m tall to sail alone in the canoes.
- Wild West Karrusellen - wave swinger that opened in 2005 in Westernland. Zierer.
- Vikingetårnene - Mini manuel observation tower ride in Vikingeland.

=== Kiddie rides ===
- Indianerland - play area with an Indian theme in Westernland.
- Mini Buffalo Bumper Cars - kiddie bumper cars that opened in 2012 in Westernland. Bertazzon.
- Pony Ekspressen - ride a mechanic horse on a track in Westernland.
- Sablen - an 11 m-tall tilt tower that opened in 2010 in Piratland. ABC Rides.
- Shooting Range - test your skills at shooting in Westernland.
- Soap bubbles - make your own soap bubbles in Westernland.
- Texas Town - playground for kids in Westernland.
- Trampolines - trampolines in Sommerland.
- Tunnel Slide - slides for the youngest kids in Sommerland.

=== Vandland ===
The water park Vandland opened in 1985 and is included in the admission price.

- Black Hole - enclosed tube ride; height limit 1.2 m.
- Hawaii - interactive play area for kids.
- Honolulu Bay - wave pool.
- Junior Aqua Park - play area for kids.
- Waikiki Surf School - six side by side slides.
- Water Slides - water slides; height limit 90 cm.
- The Wave - two-person tube halfpipe; height limit 1.4 m.
- Wild River - raging river tube ride; height limit none / 1.4 m alone.

=== Other ===
- Magical Halloween in October.
