= Syddjurs Municipality =

Syddjurs Municipality Syddjurs Kommune (Danish)
- Municipality
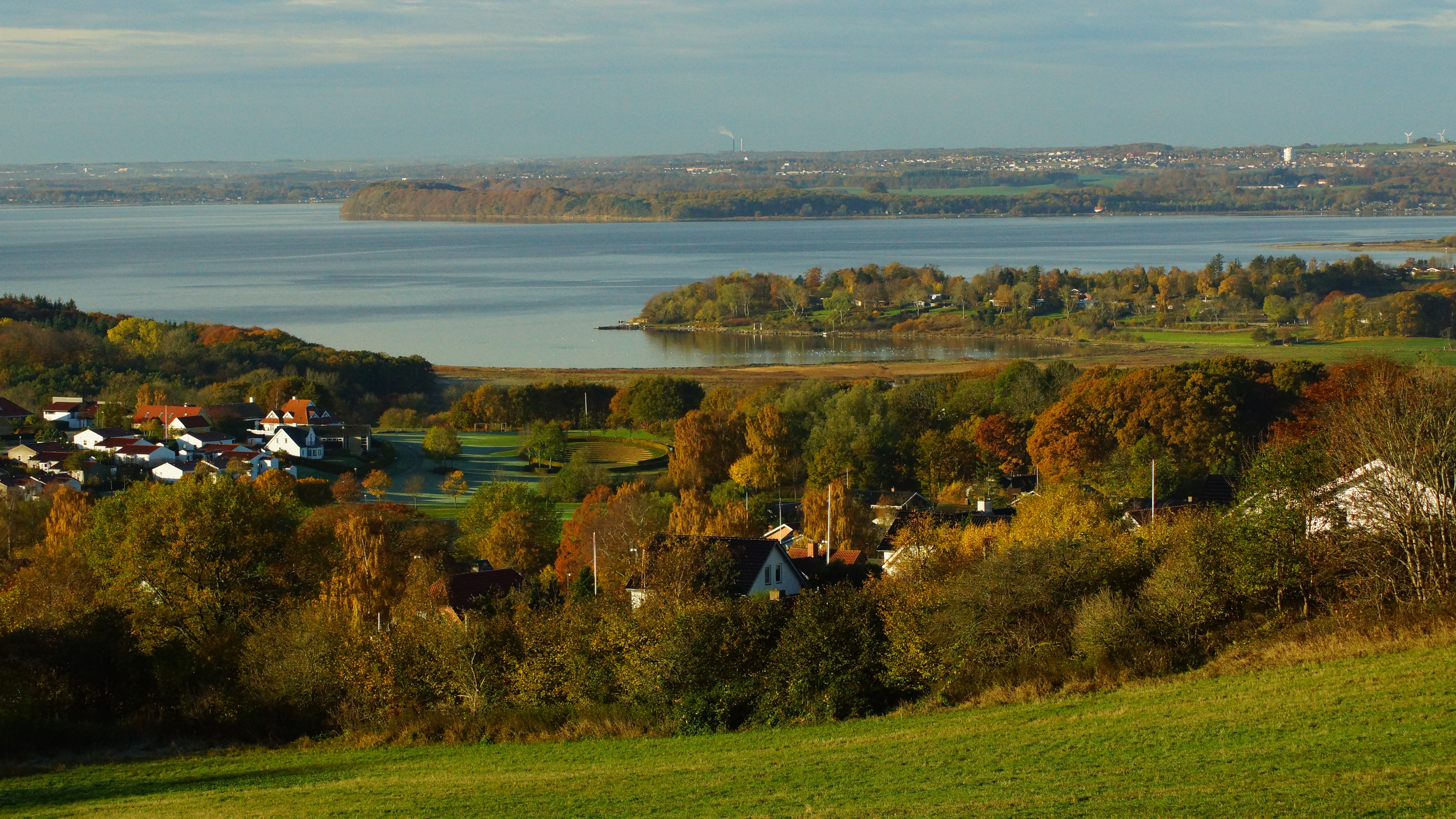

- Coat of arms

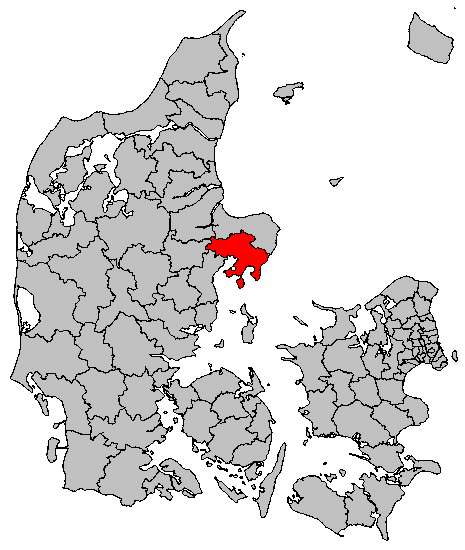
- Location in Denmark
- Coordinates: 56°18′45″N 10°31′15″E
- Country: Denmark
- Region: Central Denmark
- Established: 1 January 2007

Government
  - Mayor: Michael Stegger Jensen

Area
  - Total: 696.7 km^{2} (269.0 sq mi)

Population (1 January 2026)
  - Total: 44,394
  - Density: 63.72/km^{2} (165.0/sq mi)
- Time zone: UTC+1 (CET)
  - Summer (DST): UTC+2 (CEST)
- Postal code: 8400
- Website: www.syddjurs.dk

Syddjurs Municipality (Danish: Syddjurs Kommune) is a municipality (Danish, kommune) in Region Midtjylland in Denmark just north of Aarhus and is a part of the Aarhus area. It covers an area of 696.7 km^{2} and has a population of 44,394 (1 January 2026).

On 1 January 2007 Syddjurs municipality ("South Djursland") was created as the result of Kommunalreformen ("The Municipal Reform" of 2007), consisting of the former municipalities of Ebeltoft, Midtdjurs, Rosenholm, and Rønde. The municipality covers most of southern Djursland, Skødshoved, Helgenæs, Mols and the Ebeltoft peninsula.

The municipality is part of Business Region Aarhus and of the East Jutland metropolitan area, which had a total population of 1.378 million in 2016.

== Locations ==
Ebeltoft	7,300
Hornslet	6,300
Rønde	3,300
Ryomgård	2,700
Kolind	1,900
Mørke	1,700
Ugelbølle	1,500
Thorsager	1,400
Pindstrup	770
Knebel	620
Nimtofte	598

== Politics ==
=== Municipal council ===
Syddjurs' municipal council consists of 27 members, elected every four years.

Below are the municipal councils elected since the Municipal Reform of 2007.

Election	Party										Total seats	Turnout	Elected mayor
Election	A	B	C	F	I	L	O	V	Ø	Å	Total seats	Turnout	Elected mayor
2005	11	2	1	2		2	1	8			27	72.2%	Vilfred Friborg Hansen (A)
2009	7	1	2	6		1	1	9			27	67.9%	Kirstine Bille (F)
2013	7	1		5	2	1	2	8	1		27	74.8%	Claus Wistoft (V)
2017	8	1	1	4			3	8	1	1	27	73.8%	Ole Bollesen (A)
Data from Kmdvalg.dk 2005, 2009, 2013 and 2017

== Sources ==
- Municipal statistics: NetBorger Kommunefakta, delivered from KMD aka Kommunedata (Municipal Data)
- Municipal mergers and neighbors: Eniro new municipalities map
