= Blokhus =

- Village
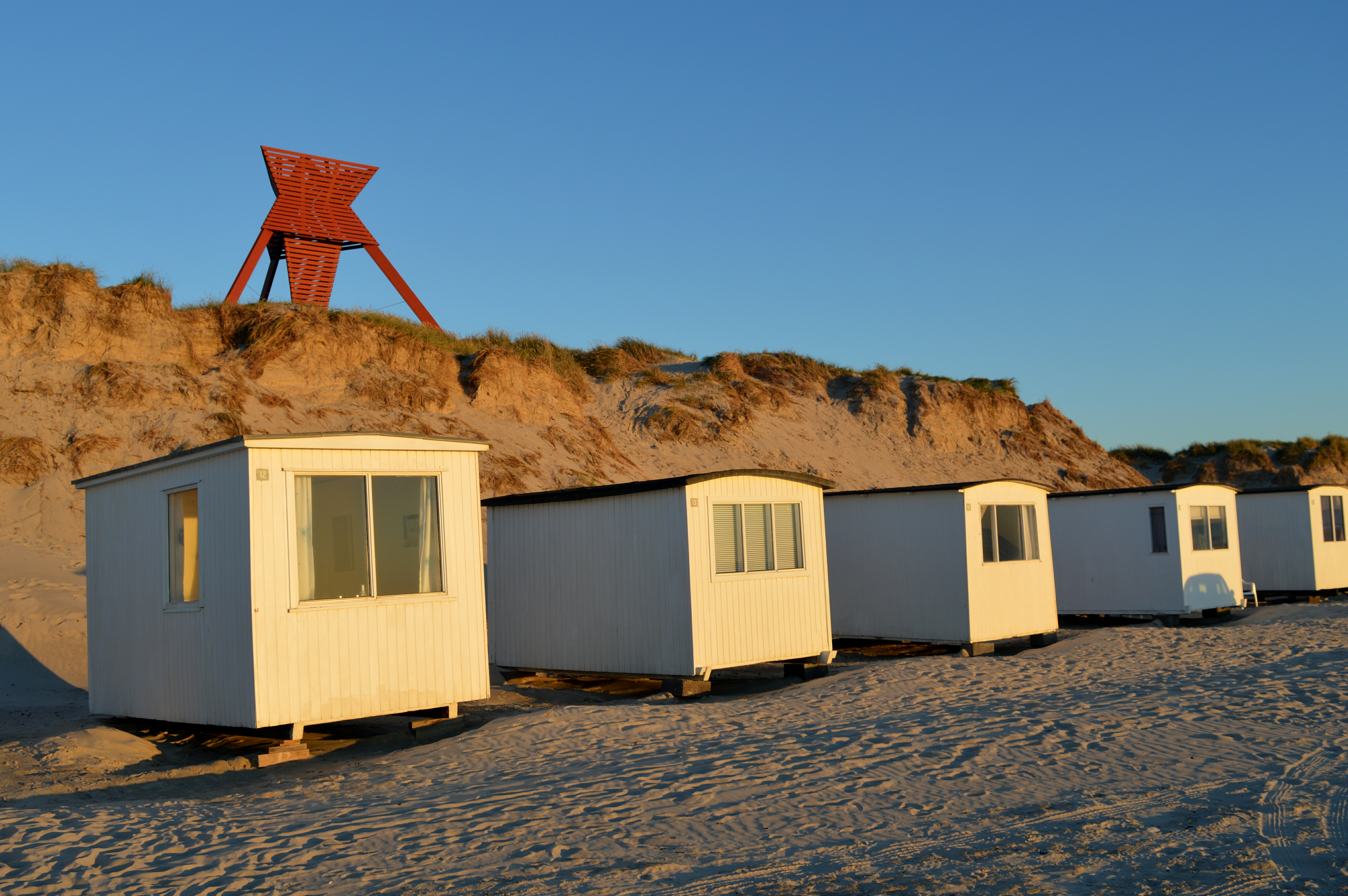
- Blokhus Beach

- Location in the North Jutland Region
- Coordinates: 57°15′8″N 9°35′3″E
- Country: Denmark
- Region: North Jutland
- Municipality: Jammerbugt

Population (2026)
  - Total: 495
- Time zone: UTC+1 (CET)
  - Summer (DST): UTC+2 (CEST)

Blokhus is a village on the North Jutlandic Island, Denmark. It is located in Jammerbugt Municipality. Blokhus is a popular beach town with around 1 million visitors every year.

== History ==
Blokhus was originally named Hune Hvarre. In the early 1600s there were barely any trees in the area, so timber was imported from Norway. The locals had to store this timber somewhere, so they constructed some houses out of the timber. These houses became known as 'block houses' (Danish: blokhuse), which gave name to the village.

Axel P. Jensen (1885–1972) was a Danish painter of landscapes. He spent most of his time in Blokhus.

== Beach ==
One of the main attractions is Blokhus Beach, which is a white, sandy bathing beach with a dune area. During the summer, 47 characteristic white beach huts are placed on the beach. It is possible to drive along Blokhus Beach. During the summer, there is a lifeguard on the beach. In 2011, a new beach centre was built, which contains restrooms, an ice cream stand and a café.

During the summer, the local cannon guild fire their cannon by the beach centre every night. In 2012, the former bowling alley in the town square was transformed into the shopping centre, Blokhuset. An outdoor stage has been built in the town square, and it has hosted recurring concerts during the summer. The stage was modernised and moved to one end of the town square in 2013.

== Dune plantation ==
Close to the town is a dune plantation, Blokhus Dune Plantation (Danish: Blokhus Klitplantage), which covers 642 hectares of land and is administered by Naturstyrelsen Vendsyssel (Danish Nature Agency of Vendsyssel). Gateway Blokhus is a recreational area in the plantation between Blokhus and Hune, and contains a natural playground, a picnic area, and an outdoor baking oven that is for general use. From Gateway Blokhus there is access to a mountain bike track and nature trails. In the northern part of the dune plantation, there is an off-leash dog area.
