= Odder Municipality =

Odder Municipality Odder Kommune (Danish)
- Municipality
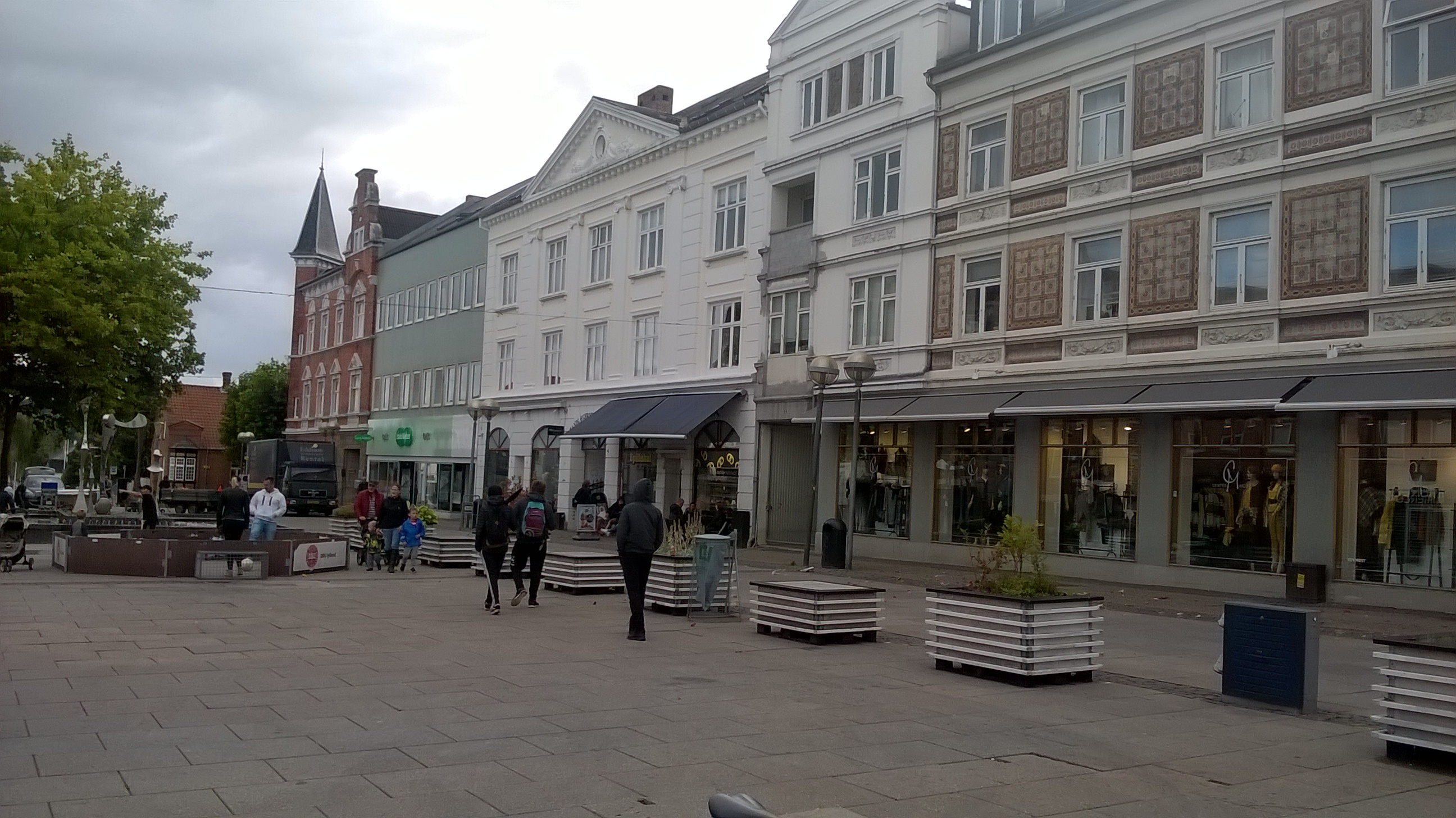
- Street in Odder

- Coat of arms

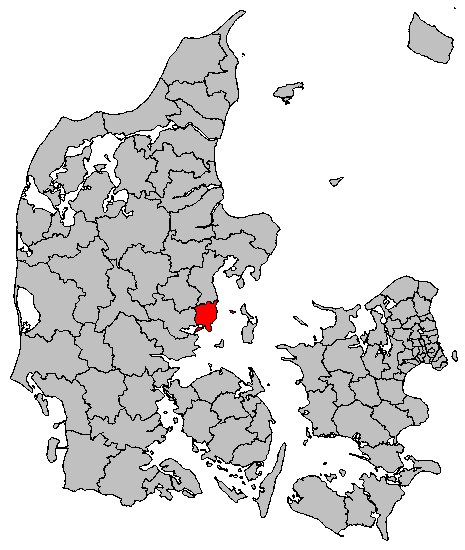
- Coordinates: 55°58′34″N 10°09′01″E
- Country: Denmark
- Region: Central Denmark
- Established: April 1, 1970
- Seat: Odder

Government
  - Mayor: Uffe Jensen (V)

Area
  - Total: 225 km^{2} (87 sq mi)

Population (1 January 2026)
  - Total: 24,310
  - Density: 108/km^{2} (280/sq mi)
- Time zone: UTC1 (CET)
  - Summer (DST): UTC2 (CEST)
- Municipal code: 727
- Website: www.odder.dk

Odder Municipality (Danish: Odder Kommune) is a municipality (Danish: kommune) in the Central Denmark Region on the east coast of the Jutland peninsula in Central Denmark south of Aarhus. It is a part of the greater Aarhus area. The municipality covers an area of 225.04 km^{2}, including the islands of Alrø and Tunø. It borders Aarhus Municipality to the north, Skanderborg Municipality to the north-west and Horsens Municipality to the west. It also connects to Hedensted Municipality across Horsens Fjord to the south, and connects to Samsø Municipality through a ferry route.

Odder Municipality was not merged with any adjacent municipality under the municipal reform of 2007.

The municipality includes the inhabited islands of Alrø and Tunø, as well as the uninhabited islands of Pollerne, Søby Rev and Hov Røn.

== History ==
Odder is first mentioned in 1363. In the middle ages, Odder was not a municipality but instead a Hundred called Hads Hundred. Denmark has historically been divided into syssels in the middle ages, and Hads Hundred was part of Løversyssel. After the Reformation Hads Hundred was placed under the Aarhusgaard Fief. It became a fief of its own in 1548, with the fief's capital set at the Åkær Manor. Hads Hundred was part of Skanderborg Fief from 1597-1650, after which it turned into Åkær County in 1660. That county was dissolved after a year, and Hads Hundred was put under Skanderborg County. It came under Aarhus County in 1799.

The two parish municipalities of Torrild and Odder were merged in 1965. In the 1970 Danish Municipal Reform, the following parish municipalities were merged to form the current Odder Municipality: Alrø, Gosmer-Halling, Gylling, Hundslund, Saksild-Nølev, Odder, Randlev-Bjerager, Torrild, Ørting-Falling and Tunø. The 2007 municipal reform did not change anything for Odder Municipality.

=== Historical divisions ===
The table below shows the historical municipal subdivisions of Odder Municipality.

Historical municipal divisions of Odder Municipality
1970	1965	1842	Towns
Odder Mun.	Odder Parish Mun.	Odder Parish Mun.	Odder
Odder Mun.	Odder Parish Mun.	Torrild Parish Mun.	Torrild
Odder Mun.	Saksild-Nølev Parish Mun.		Saksild
Odder Mun.	Randlev-Bjerager Parish Mun.		Bovlstrup
Odder Mun.	Randlev-Bjerager Parish Mun.		Neder Randlev
Odder Mun.	Gosmer-Halling Parish Mun.		Hou
Odder Mun.	Ørting-Falling Parish Mun.		Ørting
Odder Mun.	Hundslund Parish Mun.		Hundslund
Odder Mun.	Gylling Parish Mun.		Gylling
Odder Mun.	Alrø Parish Mun.		Alrø By
Odder Mun.	Tunø Parish Mun.		Tunø By

== Towns ==
Below are all settlements in the municipality with populations of at least 200 people (populations as of 2020).

Odder	12,354
Hou	1,560
Saksild	806

Ørting	686
Gylling	634
Hundslund	531

Bovlstrup	287
Torrild	231
Neder Randlev	216

=== Odder ===
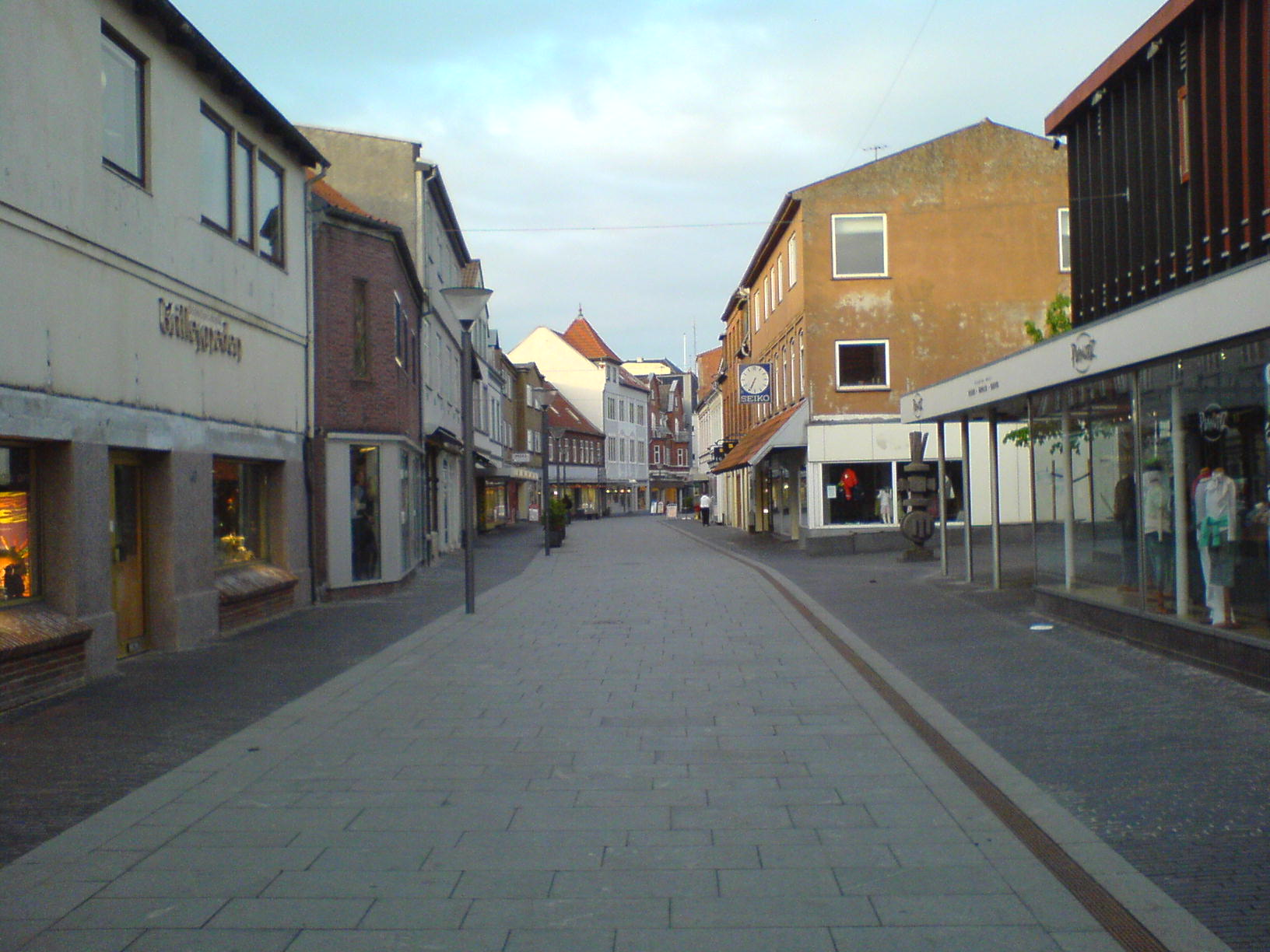
Pedestrian street in Odder.

Odder is located centrally in the northern part of the municipality. It borders the forests of Dyrehave, Vejlskov and Præstelund to the south, and the forests of Bøgebjerg and Balle Skov to the north-west. It is surrounded by fields in all other directions.

Odder is the administrative center of the municipality, and the location of the municipality's town hall. The eastern edge of the town is bordered by the botanical garden and zoo known as The Ecological Garden (Danish: Den Økologiske Have). South of that are a series of schools and the Grundtvigianism church Odder Grundtvigske Valgmenighedskirke. Further west, but still south of Odder River (Danish: Odder Å) is Odder Station and Odder Church. The culture center Pakhuset is located near the train station. The road Rosengade is a pedestrian street with many shops, restaurants and facilities. Odder Rådhus is located north of the street. Odder Museum is located further west, bordering Odder River. North of the river, and along the western part of the town are residential areas. The northern parts of the town include a sizable industrial quarter.

Near the center of the town is a sports facility called Spektrum Odder. It includes three sports halls, swimming pools, football stadiums and a café.

=== Hou ===
Hou (also spelled Hov) is located 10 km south-east of Odder. It borders Kattegat to the south and east, and the narrow strait of Hov Løb between the town and the island of Hov Røn. The forest of Halling Skov borders Hou to the south-west. Hou is other than that surrounded by fields.

In Hou is a marina and harbour, with daily ferry departures to Samsø and Tunø. The marina is a popular tourist destination.

=== Saksild ===
The coastal town of Saksild is located 6 km east of Odder and borders the Kattegat. Saksild is best known for its popular beach. Saksild Beach (Danish: Saksild Strand) stretches for 8 km south to the ferry town of Hou and can be as wide as 30 meters. The beach has garnered popularity due to its white sand, grassy banks and shallow clear water.

=== Villages ===
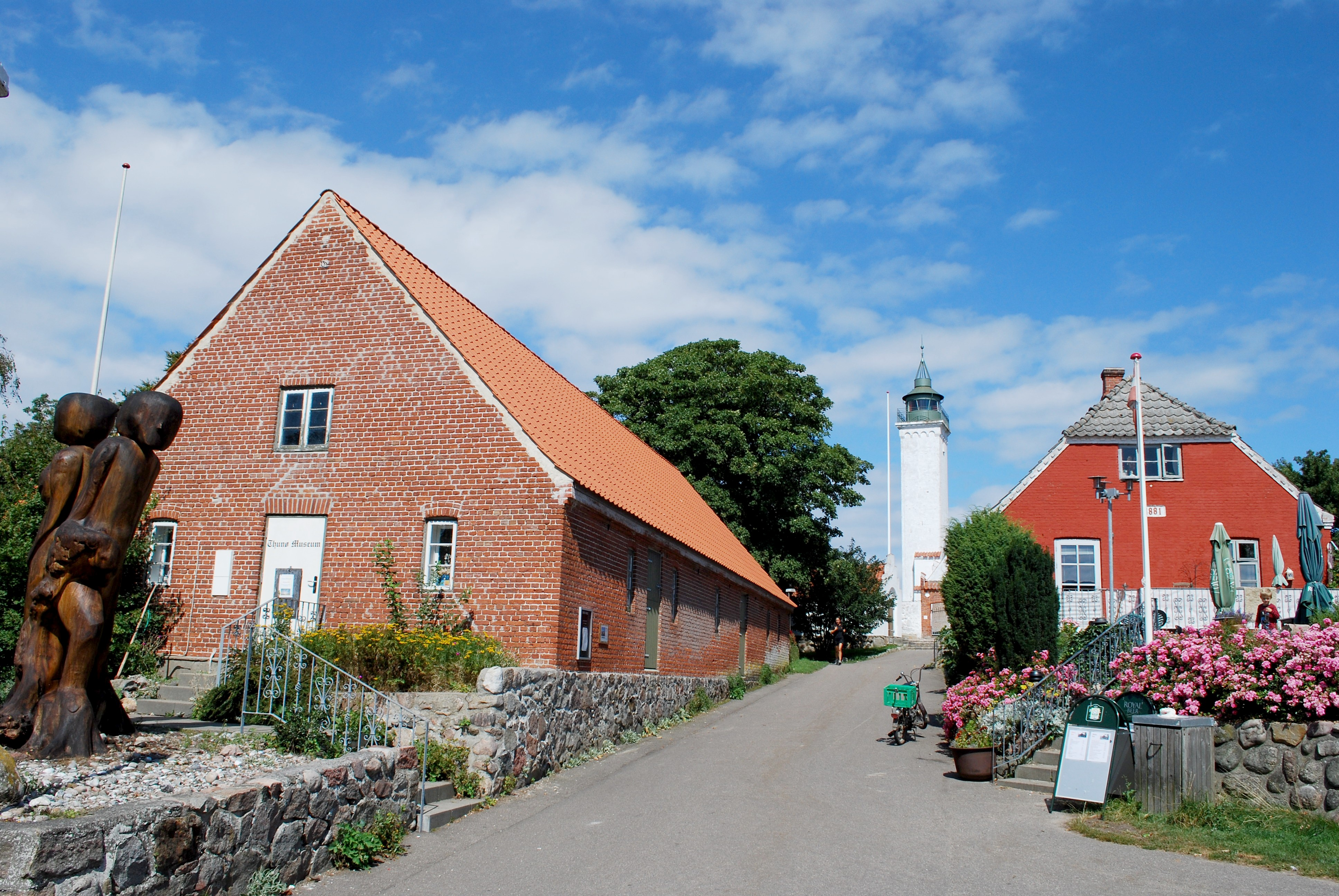
Street in Tunø By.

There are two settlements on the island of Tunø: the main village of Tunø By and the smaller settlement of Løkkegårde. Tunø is a popular tourist destination.

There are three settlements on Alrø: Alrø By, Sønderby and Løkken. A dam from 1929 connects Alrø to the mainland. Alrø Church is located in Alrø By.

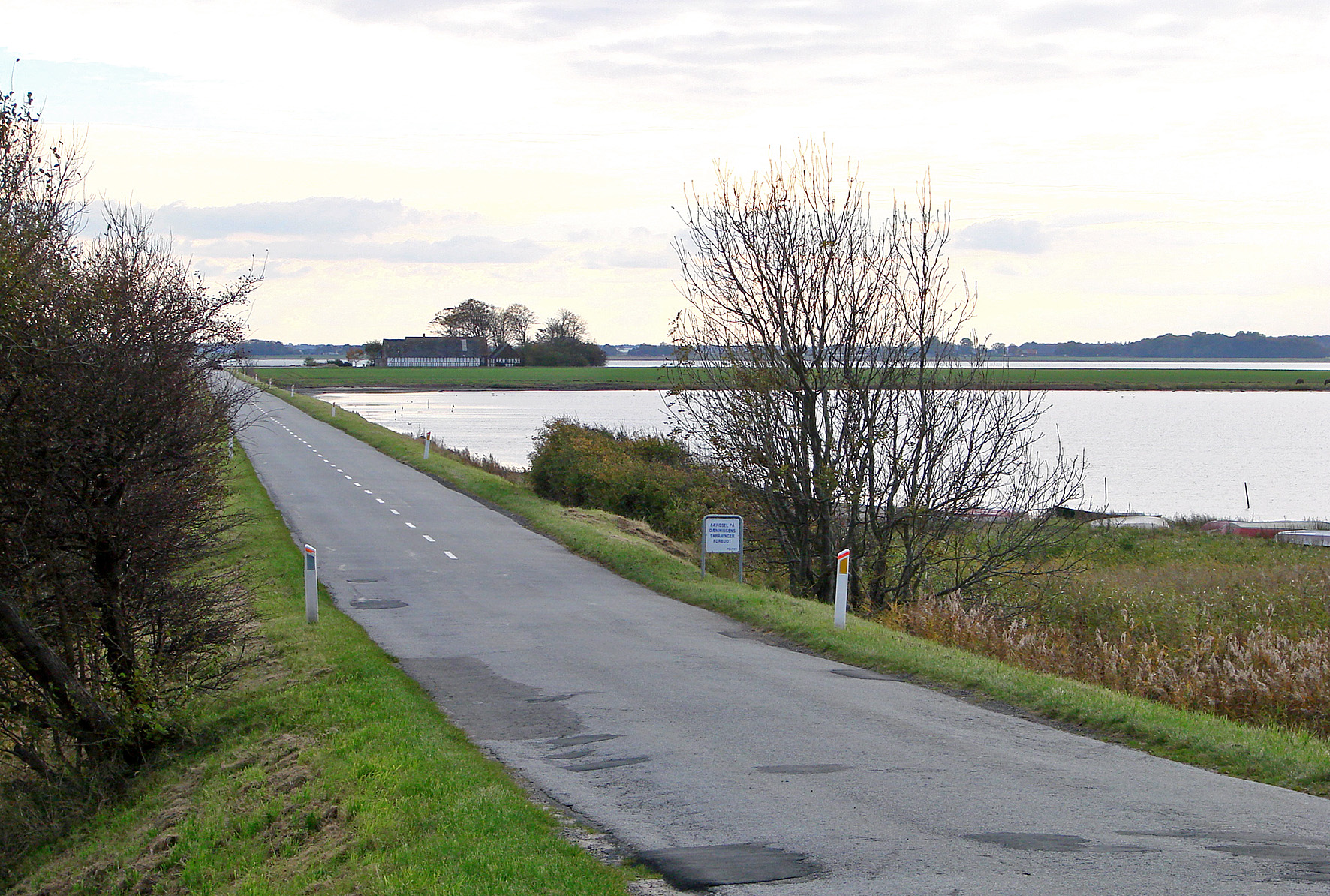
The dam connecting Alrø to the mainland.

Rude Strand is located north of Hou and east of Odder. The Rude Strand Tumulus (Danish: Rude Strand Langhøj) is located here.

Norsminde Fjord, north-west of Odder, cuts the village of Norsminde in two, with the northern part of the village located in Aarhus Municipality and the southern part in Odder Municipality. The northern part is called Norsminde, while the southern part is called Kysing Næs or Norsminde Strand. The ruins of Kysing Church is located in Kysing Næs.

In addition to these villages, there are a number of smaller settlements in the municipality. These are all the settlements with populations of less than 200 people:

Alrø By
Amstrup
Amstrup Skov
Assendrup
Balle
Balle-Findal
Ballen
Bilsbæk
Bjerager
Bovlstrup Mark
Bovlstrup Strand
Brokgraven

Damledet
Dilbjerg
Drammelstrup
Driften
Dyngby
Dyngby Lund
Dyngby Lyng
Dyngby Strand
Falling
Falling Skov
Fensholt
Fensholt Mark

Fensten
Fillerup
Gjesing
Gosmer
Grindsnap
Gyllingskov
Hadrup
Halkær Mark
Halling
Halling Mark
Hedemark
Heden

Hesselbjerg
Hylken
Hylken Strand
Højby
Kalsemade
Krogstrup
Kukhuse
Kysing
Kærsgårde
Lerdrup
Lerdrupskov
Løkken

Malskær
Morsholt
Nølev
Nørskov
Oldrup
Ondrup
Over Randlev
Præstemarken
Randlev Mose
Rold
Rude
Rude Strand

Rørt
Rørt Elle
Rørt Skov
Saksild Strand
Sander
Skablund
Smederup
Snærild
Sondrup
Sondrup Strand
Splidholm
Spøttrup

Studshoved
Svinballe
Svorbæk
Søby
Sødrup
Sønderby
Tendrup
Torrild Nørreskov
Trekanten
Trustrup
Træskov
Tunø By

Tuskær
Tvenstrup
Ulvskov
Vestergårde
Vesterskov
Ørting Mose
Østergårde
Åkær Huse
Ålstrup
Ålstrup Mark

== Nature ==
Odder Municipality is home to many forests, and its coastal location on Kattegat make it home to a long coastline with many breeding sites for birds.

A hilly area west of Hou has been protected since 1959. Another 368 acres south of Odder has been protected since 1979.

Near the center of the town of Odder is a protected nature area known as Stampmølledalen, home to a forest and the brook Stampmøllebækken. It has been protected since 2000, to ensure free access to nature for the citizens of Odder, as well as to preserve the area home to the common kingfisher, a rare species in Denmark. The white-throated dipper can also be found in Stampmølledalen during the winter.

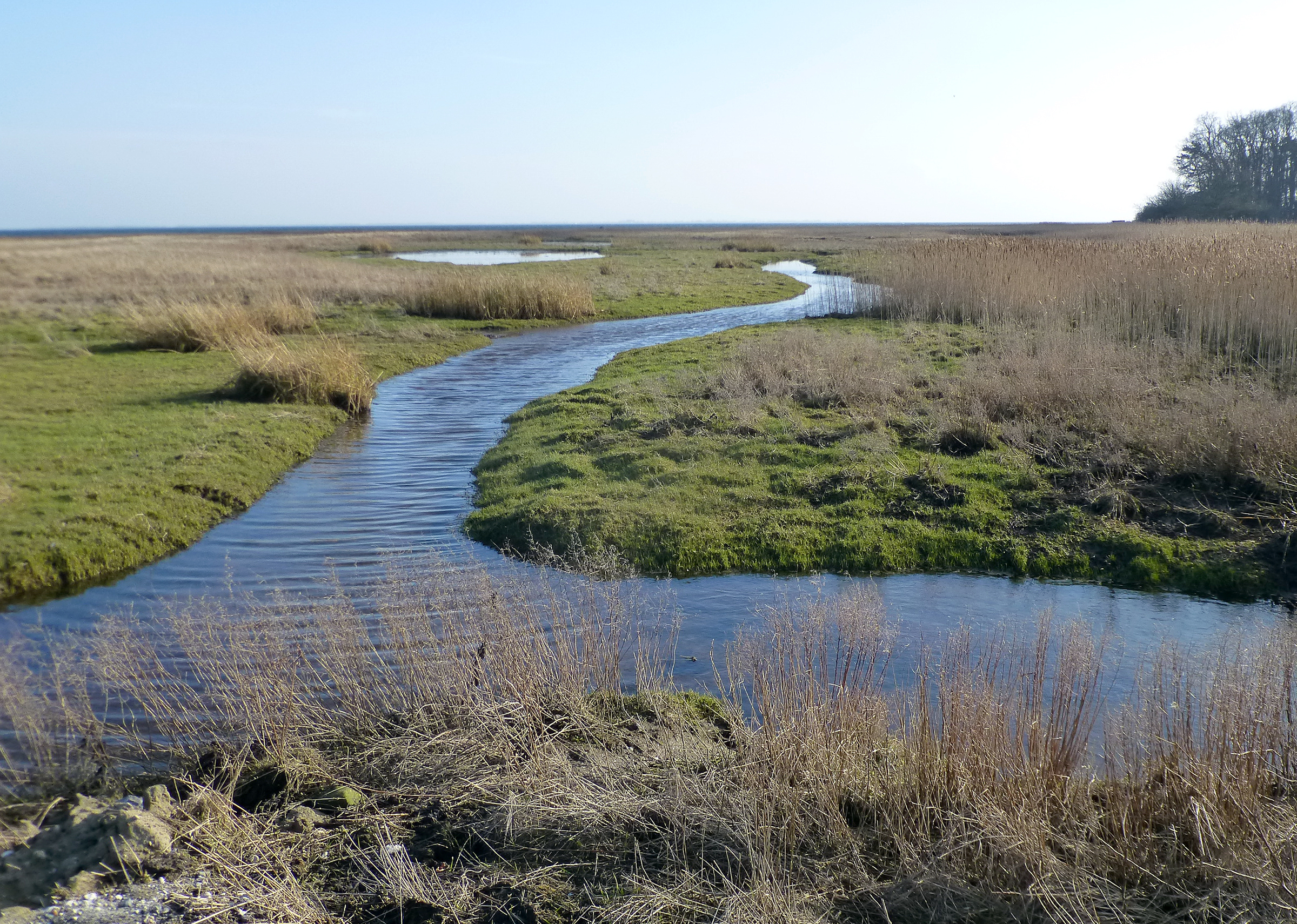
Beach meadows on Gyllingnæs.

18 acres of coast on the peninsula of Gyllingnæs has been protected since 1985. The area is known as Horskær and is home to many birds, including several of the birds of prey found in Denmark, such as common kestrel, common buzzard and western marsh harrier.

The northern coast along Horsens Fjord, by Vorsø and Alrø, has been protected in five stages. In Odder Municipality, the protected area include Uldrup Bakker, Sondrup Plantage, Åkær Å, Hestehave, Bavnhøj, Skablund Skov and the surrounding areas. The total protected area, across both Odder and Horsens Municipality span 2,100 acres.

Søby Rev are a series of small islands and islet located in Kattegat south of Hou. They span 7,5 acres. The vegetation consist mainly of grass and leymus arenarius.

There are a series of smaller islands and islets in the municipality. A number of small uninhabited islands and islets, known as Pollerne, are located east of Alrø.

=== Norsminde Fjord ===
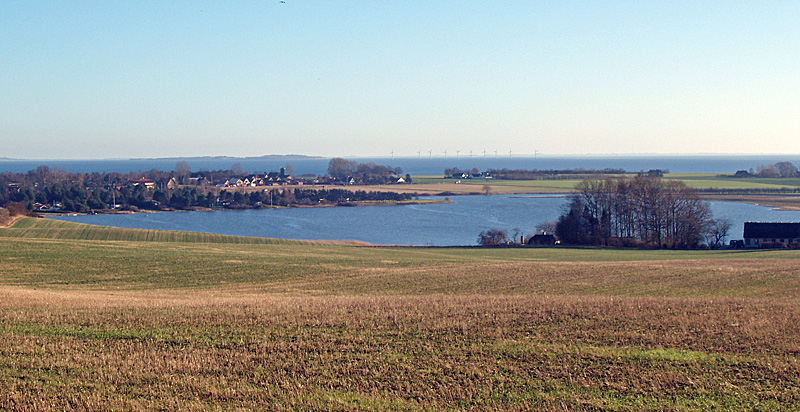
Norsminde Fjord.

Norsminde Fjord borders the municipality to the north-east, and 50 acres in Odder Municipality has been protected since 1970. The fjord is an important area for birds, and has a varied surrounding nature that includes hills and beach meadows. The fjord itself span 187 acres. The fjord is home to a large amount of birds, though is not used for breeding by any birds. It is rich in food, so it is a popular foraging spot for coot, wigeon, mallard, tufted duck, teal, mute swan, lapwing, golden plover, dunlin and oystercatcher. The white-tailed eagle, and a series of other birds of prey, can be found in the area. The western marsh harrier is one of the few birds that breed in the fjord. In total, more than 200 species of birds has been registered seen in the fjord.

The dykes along the fjord are mainly covered in crataegus. The vegetation in the fjord itself is dominated by ulva lactuca, which can at times block out the sun for other plants in the water. The ulva lactuca is very resistant, and is a sign of pollution from the surrounding agriculture.

=== Hou Røn ===
Hou Røn is an island of 2 acres located 2 km south-east of Hou. The island first appeared in the 1930s, and has at times been entirely flooded or split into several islands. It grew together to form the current island over time, and is today covered in vegetation. The island is a breeding spot for many birds, including common eider, mallard, oystercatcher, great black-backed gull, European herring gull and red-breasted merganser. At one point rats had invaded the island, but they were removed from the island again by a local hunter. Hunting on the island is forbidden while birds are breeding.

=== Alrø ===
Alrø is a flat island, with the highest point of the island being only 14 meters above sea level. With many parts of the island lying below sea level, the island can at times be split into two. The island span 8 km², and most of the land is used for agriculture. This also means that there is barely any forests, though roe deer and several other mammals still live on the island. The European hare thrive on the island's fields. The raccoon dog is also found on the island. The greylag goose and white-tailed eagle breed on the island, and great cormorant is also commonly seen.

=== Tunø ===
Tunø.

Nearly the entire island of Tunø has been protected since 1965. The protected area amounts to 3.5 km² or 348 acres in total, and only excludes Tunø By and a small part of the harbour. The island is hilly, with forests, bogs and stony beaches. A valley splits the island in two, and it has historically been two separate islands. The valley is today covered in forests.

There aren't many birds on the island, though with the notable exception of the black guillemot. The island is home to one of Denmark's largest populations of black guillemot, a rare bird in Denmark. The other birds on the island are eurasian woodcock, western marsh harrier, common pheasant, grey partridge and common gull. The European green toad can be found on the island, and the nearby island of Samsø is the northernmost habitat for the frog in Europe. The mammals on the island are few, with only roe deer, European hare, European hedgehog, harbor seal, mice and rats. The harbour porpoise can be seen off the island's coast. The common blue butterfly is found on Tunø, though is rare in the rest of Denmark.

The Tunø Knob Offshore Wind Farm is located off the coast of Tunø.

== Politics ==
The municipality is part of Business Region Aarhus and of the East Jutland metropolitan area, which had a total population of 1.378 million in 2016. Odder municipality was not merged with other municipalities as part of the extensive Municipal Reform of 2007. The mayor has since 2014 been Uffe Jensen of Venstre.

On the table below is an overview of all elections held in Denmark since the 2007 Municipal Reform. The percentages in the table are the local results from Odder Municipality. The party with the most votes received is shaded in their respective color. In all but one election the largest party has been either the Social Democrats or Venstre, with the two parties being approximately the same size in most elections. The one exception was in the 2014 European Parliament election where the largest party in the municipality became the Danish People's Party. This was the case in most of the country, and the first time in Denmark's history that the party had been the largest party in a nationwide election.

Election	Percentage													Turnout
Election	A	B	C	D	F	I	K	N	O	V	Ø	Å	...	Turnout
2007 Folketing	28.2	5.1	9.1	—	12.9	2.7	0.5	—	10.5	29.5	1.5	—	0.0	89.7%
2009 EP	23.8	4.2	12.4	—	16.3	0.5	—	6.1	12.7	21.7	—	—	2.4	66.1%
2009 Local	24.9	1.4	14.2	—	18.4	—	—	—	3.7	25.8	0.7	—	11.0	72.9%
2009 Region	33.6	3.2	10.6	—	17.5	—	0.5	—	5.7	25.9	1.7	—	1.3	72.8%
2011 Folketing	27.4	9.2	4.1	—	9.8	3.9	0.5	—	9.7	30.0	5.4	—	0.0	70.1%
2013 Local	23.4	5.2	8.4	—	8.0	1.4	—	—	6.6	39.0	5.0	—	3.1	79.4%
2013 Region	33.9	4.4	8.2	—	7.4	1.5	0.7	—	6.2	30.9	5.7	—	1.0	79.2%
2014 EP	19.3	6.5	8.4	—	13.4	2.3	—	6.8	23.1	20.2	—	—	—	61.8%
2015 Folketing	29.9	3.7	2.9	—	4.0	6.5	0.6	—	17.4	22.5	5.8	6.4	0.1	89.0%
2017 Local	25.6	5.8	7.7	—	5.6	1.7	—	—	6.0	38.5	7.0	1.6	0.4	77.6%
2017 Region	34.9	4.0	4.6	0.7	5.0	1.6	0.8	—	5.8	30.8	6.1	2.0	3.6	77.4%
2019 EP	24.1	8.7	5.8	—	14.6	1.8	—	2.8	9.2	24.6	5.3	3.1	—	72.6%
2019 Folketing	27.0	7.6	8.1	1.8	8.4	1.6	1.8	—	7.6	24.6	6.4	2.9	2.1	88.2%
2021 Local	25.2	8.6	13.5	2.7	5.8	—	—	—	1.3	31.1	11.5	—	0.4	74.8%
2021 Region	33.5	5.8	9.1	3.3	9.4	0.9	1.3	—	2.3	20.6	10.8	0.5	2.4	74.6%
Data from Kmdvalg.dk

=== Municipal council ===
Odder's municipal council consists of 19 members, elected every four years.

Below are the municipal council elected since the municipality's creation in 1970.

Election	Party										Total seats	Turnout	Elected mayor
Election	A	B	C	E	F	O	V	Z	Ø	...	Total seats	Turnout	Elected mayor
1970	8	1	4	1			5				19		Søren Aagaard (C)
1974	7	2	3	1			5	1			19		Søren Aagaard (C)
1978	8	2	2	1			4	1		1	19		Vagn Mikkelsen (A)
1981	7	1	3	1	1		5	1			19		Vagn Mikkelsen (A)
1985	7	1	4		2		5				19		Erik Toftegaard (V)
1989	8		5		1		4			1	19		Gerda Pedersen (A)
1993	7	1	5		1		4			1	19		Iver Tesdorpf (C)
1997	7		3		1		6			2	19		Elvin J. Hansen (A)
2001	7		3		1		6			2	19		Niels-Ulrik Bugge (V)
2005	6		3		2		6			2	19	74.6%	Niels-Ulrik Bugge (V)
2009	5		3		4		6			1	19	72.9%	Elvin J. Hansen (A)
2013	4	1	2		2	1	8		1		19	79.4%	Elvin J. Hansen (A)
2017	5	1	2		1	1	7		2		19	77.6%	Uffe Jensen (V)
2021	5	2	2		1		7		2		19	74.8%	Lone Jakobi (A)
Data from Kmdvalg.dk, Statistikbanken.dk and editions of Kommunal Aarbog

=== Mayors ===
Since the 1970 municipal reform, the mayors of Odder Municipality have been:

#	Mayor	Party	Term
1	Søren Aagaard	Conservative People's Party	1970–1978
2	Vagn Mikkelsen	Social Democrats	1978–1985
3	Erik Toftegaard	Venstre	1986–1989
4	Gerda Pedersen	Social Democrats	1990–1993
5	Iver Tesdorpf	Conservative People's Party	1994–1997
6	Elvin J. Hansen	Social Democrats	1998–2005
7	Niels-Ulrik Bugge	Venstre	2006–2009
(6)	Elvin J. Hansen	Social Democrats	2010–2013
8	Uffe Jensen	Venstre	2014–2021
9	Lone Jakobi	Social Democrats	2022–

== Economy ==
The largest industries in Odder Municipality are healthcare, education, retail, construction and food services.

Companies with their headquarter in Odder Municipality include a stroller factory called Oddervognen. The company has existed since 1925, and is the only stroller factory remaining in Denmark. ProTruck is a company that sell forklifts and similar specialized vehicles, and is also located in Odder.

== Demographics ==
Historical population
Year	Pop.	±%
1971	16,053	—
1975	16,825	+4.8%
1980	17,654	+4.9%
1985	17,949	+1.7%
1990	18,744	+4.4%
1995	19,251	+2.7%
2000	19,901	+3.4%
2005	21,133	+6.2%
2010	21,721	+2.8%
2015	21,928	+1.0%
2016	22,131	+0.9%
2017	22,331	+0.9%
2018	22,626	+1.3%
2019	22,675	+0.2%
2020	22,844	+0.7%
2021	22,979	+0.6%
Source: Statistikbanken.dk

There are 22,844 people living in Odder Municipality (2020). 49.27% are men and 50.73% are women.

Below is the age distribution of the municipality.

Age
1. 0-5 (5.99%)
2. 6-17 (15.1%)
3. 18-35 (16.4%)
4. 36-64 (39.0%)
5. 64+ (23.5%)

== Education ==
There are 7 ground schools, 4 efterskoler and 3 independent schools in the municipality. There are also 3 gymnasiums, 4 folk high schools and 1 youth school in the municipality. One of the ground schools, Vestskolen, is split into two department: Skovbakken and Vestermarken.

There are 2 libraries in the municipality: one in Odder and one on Tunø.

== Transport ==
The Odder Line is a former railroad, today a light rail, connecting Aarhus and Odder. It originally also connected Odder and Hou, but that stretch was shut down in 1977. The rail was renovated and turned into a light rail in 2008.

There are three ferry routes from Odder Municipality. Cykelfærgen connects Alrø and the town of Snaptun in Hedensted Municipality. Samsøfærgen connects Hou and the town of Sælvig on Samsø. Tunøfærgen connects Hou and Tunø.

== Sights ==
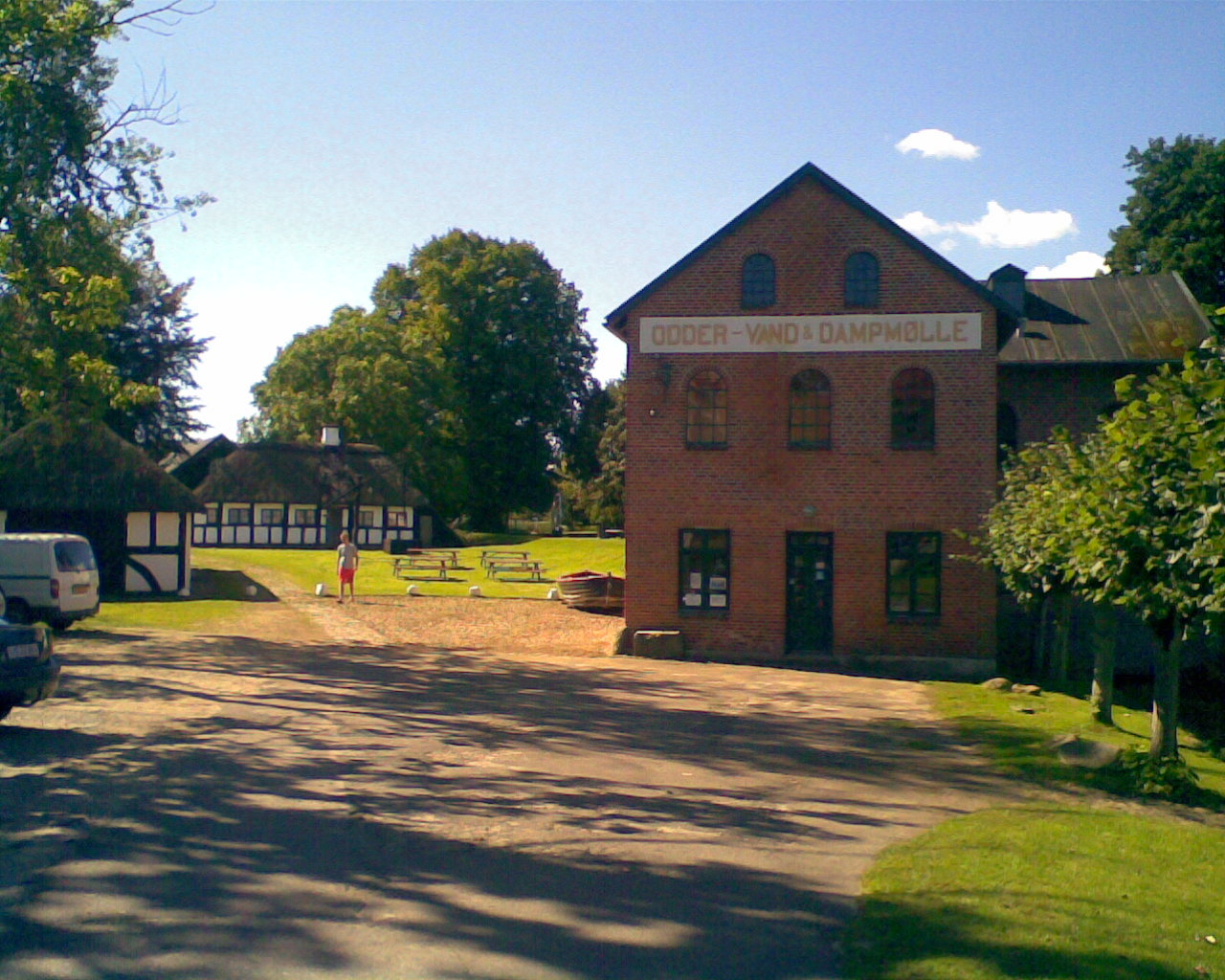
Odder Museum in the water- and steam mill.

The sights of the municipality are mostly found in the town of Odder, though with churches found in many smaller towns and villages across the municipality.

- The Ecological Garden (Danish: Den Økologiske Have) is a botanical garden, vineyard, forest and zoo located in Odder. It was established in 1991. The animals in the garden include various types of livestock, shetland ponies, budgerigars and cockatiels. The garden has a herbal garden with various medicational herbs.
- Odder Town Hall (Danish: Odder Rådhus) is the town hall for the municipality. It is located in Odder and was built in 1972. It was expanded in 1980.
- Odder Museum is located centrally in Odder, next to Odder Water- and Steam Mill (Danish: Odder Vand- og Dampmølle), which is part of the museum. The museum has 400 m² of exhibitions, mainly focussed on local history. The mill is from 1883 and stands as it did when production stopped in 1955.
- Bjørnkær's Ruins (Danish: Bjørnkærs Ruiner) are the ruins of a castle and fortification from the middle ages, located 2 km west of Hou. The castle was built in the 1200s, and ruined sometime in the 1300s. It was rebuilt and remained in use until the late 1400s. The ruins are locally known as Marks Stig's Castle (Danish: Marsk Stigs Borg), though there is no evidence that Marsk Stig lived there.
- Rude Strand Tumulus (Danish: Rude Strand Langhøj) is a tumulus located near Rude Strand. It originates from around 3500 BC and stone coffins remain inside the tumulus.

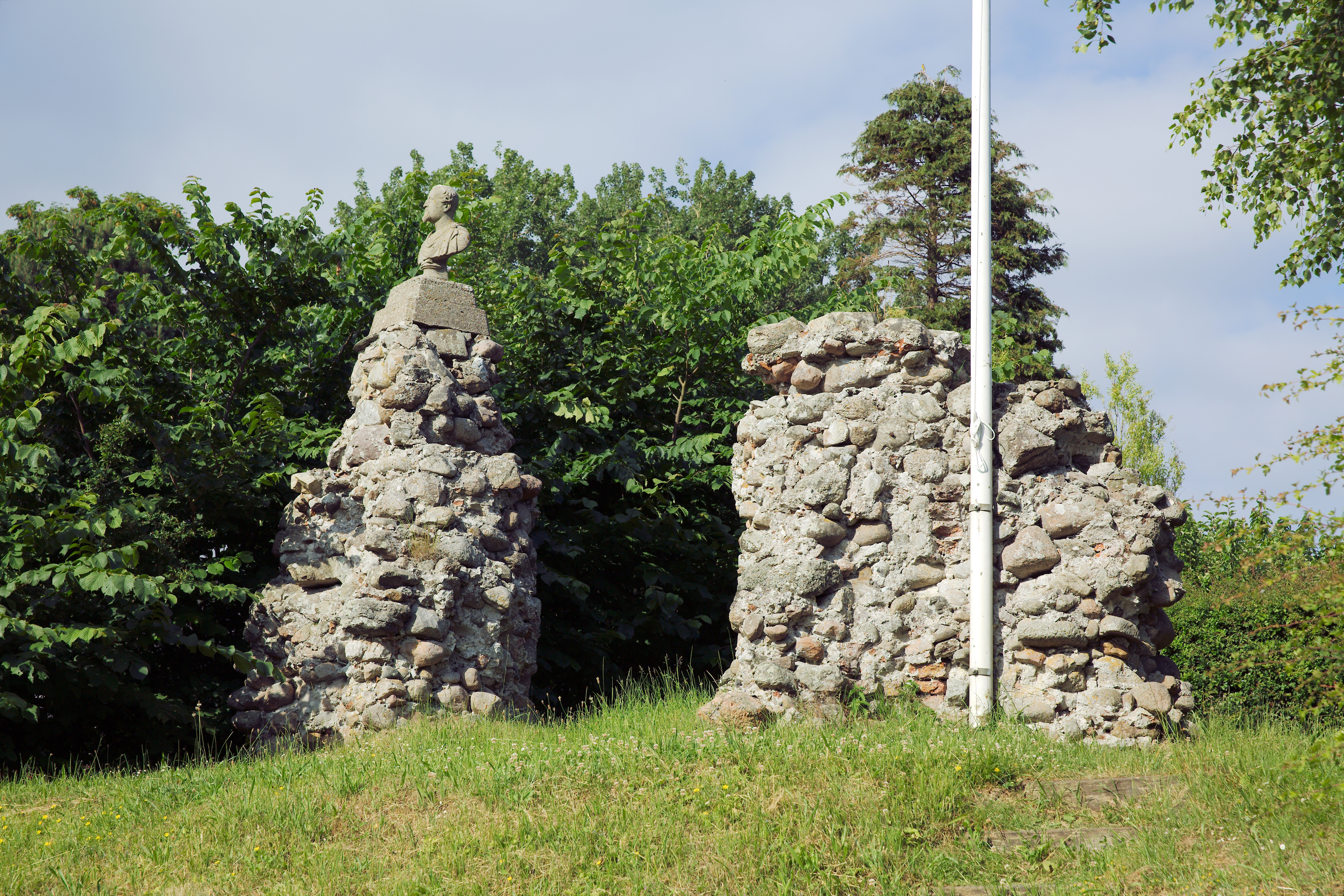
Kysing Church ruins.

- Kysing Church is the ruin of a church located in Kysing Næs, the southern part of Norsminde. The church was built in the 1200s, but was abandoned in the 1700s and began to disintegrate. The cemetery was used until the 1850s. A bust of Frederick VII was placed on the ruins in 1875 and the ruins were turned into a monument, dedicated to the Second Schleswig War. The ruins were protected in 1981.

=== Castles and manors ===
- Dybvad is a manor located south-east of Ørting. It is known to have existed from the 1500s. It belonged to the Aakær Manor until 1536, where it was taken over by the crown along with Aakær. Dybvad has been a part of Aakær for most of its history, with short breaks. It split up from Aakær in 1914. The manor own 514 acres.
- Gersdorffslund is a manor located west of Hou. The manor was established in 1674 from the farms of Porsborg and Højby, both known to have existed from the Middle Ages. Both farms were a part of Aakær Manor until 1660 where the crown gave Aakær and its territory to Joachim Gersdorff, as a replacement for his lost territory in Scania after the Dano-Swedish War. When Gersdorff died shortly after, in 1661, his manors were inherited by his heirs. Porsborg and Højby were inherited by Margrethe Gersdorff, his daughter, who married Gregorius Rathlou. Margrethe Gersdorff and Gregorius Rathlou established the new manor of Gersdorffslund from their territory in 1674.

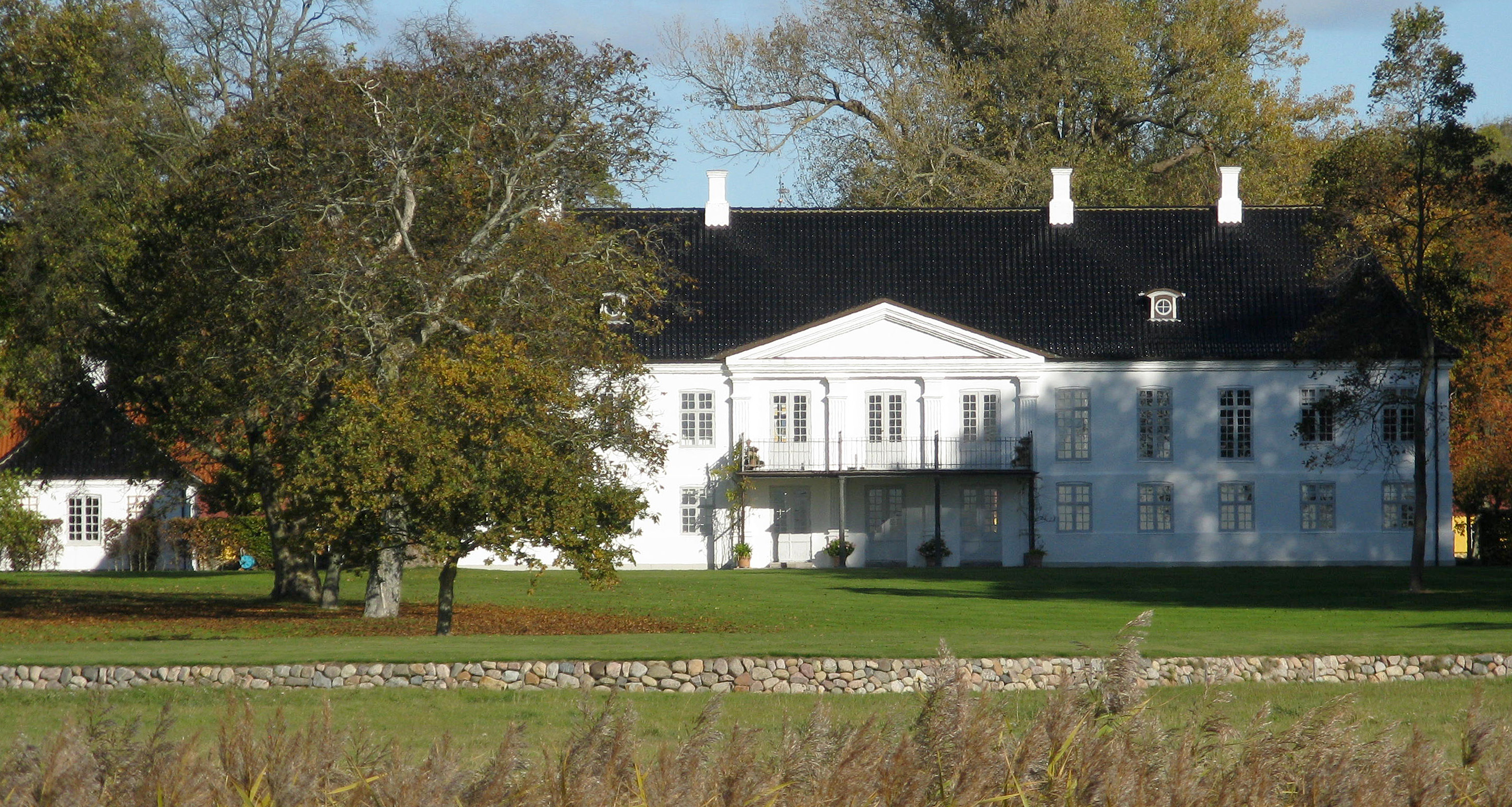
Gyllingnæs Manor.

- Gyllingnæs is a manor located south of Gylling, on a peninsula between Kattegat and Horsens Fjord. The area was covered in oak trees until 1797, where a number of farmers bought and cultivated the land. In 1801 the area of Gyllingnæs was owned by the Aakær Manor, but was sold to John Smith from England. John Smith, who lived in Altona, began construction of a house, which was finished in 1803. When he bought the nearby church in 1810, the house officially became a manor. The manor acquired more land through the years. A new main building was constructed in 1865, and in 1933 the former main building was destroyed in a fire. The manor is today owned by owner of Bestseller Troels Holch Povlsen. The manor own 646 acres, with mostly forests and agricultural land.
- Rathlousdal is a manor located outside of Odder, to the south-west. It was originally a farm called Loverstrup, but was established as a manor in 1570.
- Rodsteenseje is a manor located outside of Odder, to the south-east. It was formerly named Hovedstrup, but renamed to Rodsteenseje in 1681. The manor originates from around year 1300. IT was in 2012 bought by the owner of Aakær.

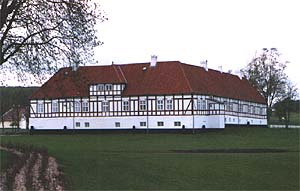
Aakær Manor.

- Aakær (also spelled Åkjær) is a manor located between the villages of Hundslund and Ørting, south of Odder. The manor is known to have existed from at least 1350, and was sold to the bishop of Aarhus, Bo Mogensen, in 1398. It became the main farmhouse in Hads Hundred for the bishops, and they began expanding the manor. In 1536, after the Reformation, the territory of the bishops was taken by the crown, including Aakær. Aakær became the seat of a newly established fief in 1548, with the fief named after the manor. The crown continued expanding Aakær and in 1660 nearly all manor houses in Hads Hundred belonged to Aakær. After the Dano-Swedish War ended in 1660, Denmark was forced to hand over several manors in Scania to Sweden. Among those were manors owned by Joachim Gersdorff, who as replacement was given manors by the crown, including Aakær. Gersdorff died shortly after, in 1661, and his son Frederik Gersdorff took over Aakær. He wasn't interested in the manor though, and sold it to his brother-in-law Jørgen Bielke in 1674. The manor changed hands many times and lost territory over the years. In 1803 it was bought by Henrik Reventlow, who began buying back the lost territory. The manor owns 1,240 acres.

=== Churches ===
See List of churches in Odder Municipality

=== Events ===
Hou Harbour Festival (Danish: Hou Havnefestival) takes place in Hou every year in the second weekend of July. The festival take place around Hou Harbour, and includes food, live music, sport and entertainment. The sport events include swimming contests in the harbour.

Sondrup Market is a yearly flea market. It takes place the first saturday in July in Hundslund. In addition to the flea market, Sondrup Market also has live music and entertainment. The organization responsible for the market also arranges other smaller markets in Hundslund across the year.

Until 2020 a yearly music festival took place on Tunø. It had been held yearly since 1987, but was ended by the festival's board in 2020.

== Sport ==
The Odder Idræts- og Gymnastikforening (Odder IGF) football club is set in Odder. The club is housed in a stadium called Spektrum Park, located in Odder. Apart from football, Spektrum Park and Odder IGF also provides access and facilities for other sports such as badminton, basketball, handball, table tennis, tennis and skateboarding. Also located in Spektrum Park are swimming facilities, with the swimming pool hosting occasional events as well as providing facilities for the municipality's schools and kindergartens.

== Parishes ==
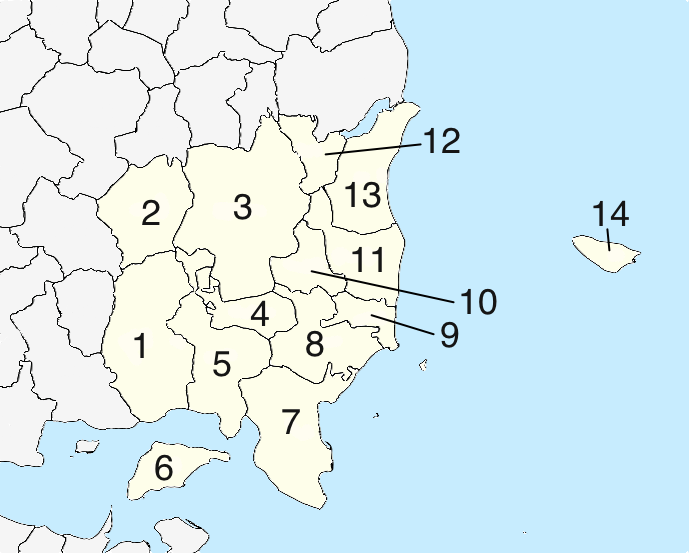
Parishes of Odder Municipality.

There are 14 parishes in Odder Municipality. Shown in the table below are the populations of each parish, as well as the percentage of that population that are members of the Church of Denmark. All numbers are from 1 January 2020.

#	Parish	Population	%	Source
1	Hundslund	1,261	82.08	
2	Torrild	495	79.60	
3	Odder	13,172	81.44	
4	Ørting	868	85.2	
5	Falling	473	80.13	
6	Alrø	150	90.67	
7	Gylling	1,053	81.86	
8	Gosmer	543	85.64	
9	Halling	1,594	83.44	
10	Randlev	605	85.29	
11	Bjerager	740	78.38	
12	Nølev	223	85.20	
13	Saksild	1,519	82.09	
14	Tunø	105	85.71	

== Symbols ==
Coat of arms of Odder Municipality.

The coat of arms of Odder Municipality is a slightly modified version of the town of Odder's coat of arms. It features a golden oak twig with two leaves and an acorn on red background. Two white wavy lines cross the coat of arms and come together at the top. The white lines represent the rivers surrounding Odder. The coat of arms was adopted in 2009.

== Notable residents ==
=== Public thought and politics ===
- Gustav Adolph Hagemann (1842 on Rodsteenseje — 1916), engineer
- Karen Jeppe (1876 in Gylling — 1935), social worker known for her work with Ottoman Armenian refugees and survivors of the Armenian Genocide
- Knud Enggaard (born 1929 in Odder), politician
- Elvin J. Hansen (born 1950 in Torrild), politician and former mayor of the municipality
- Kirsten Brosbøl (born 1977 in Odder), politician
- Mette Dencker (born 1978 in Odder), politician and MF

=== Art ===
- Rasmus Andersen (1861 in Ørting — 1930), sculptor
- Ejler Bille (1910 in Odder — 2004), artist
- Jane Muus (1919 in Odder — 2007), painter
- Jens Jørn Spottag (born 1957 in Odder), actor
- Morten Nørgaard (born 1990 in Odder), singer

=== Sport ===
- Hans Christian Nielsen (1928 in Odder — 1990), football player
- Niels Fredborg (born 1946 in Odder), cyclist
- Mogens Jeppesen (born 1953 in Gylling), handball player
- Henrik Mortensen (born 1968 in Odder), football player
- Jakob Fenger-Larsen (born 1971 in Odder), football player
- Torben Grimmel (born 1975 in Odder), sport shooter
- Pernille Harder (born 1977 in Odder), badminton player
- Juliane Rasmussen (born 1979 in Odder), rower
- Louise Pedersen (born 1979 in Odder), handball player
- Steffen Ernemann (born 1982 in Odder), football player
- Thomas Mogensen (born 1983 in Odder), handball player
- Thomas Kvist (born 1987 in Odder), cyclist
- Anders Skaarup Rasmussen (born 1989 in Odder), badminton player
- Steffen Jensen (born 1989 in Odder), rower
- Morten Ring Christensen (born 1990 in Odder), athlete
- Mathias Bay-Smidt (born 1996 in Odder), badminton player
