= Alro =

Alro may refer to:

- Alrø, small Danish island in Horsens Fjord
- Alro Slatina, the biggest aluminium company in Romania
- AS Alro Slatina, professional football club from Slatina, Romania
