= Listed buildings in Odder Municipality =

This is a list of listed buildings in Odder Municipality, Denmark.

== Listed buildings ==
Listing name	Image	Location	Coordinates	Description
Central Hotel; Centralhotellet		Rosensgade 18, 8300 Odder	55°58′21.23″N 10°8′48.52″E	Central building and theater building. Protected 1993.
Central Hotel; Centralhotellet		Rosensgade 16, 8300 Odder	55°58′21.04″N 10°8′49.33″E	Eastern wing.
Central Hotel; Centralhotellet		Rosensgade 20, 8300 Odder	55°58′20.96″N 10°8′47.65″E	Western wing.
Dybvad		Gyllingvej 31, 8300 Odder	55°55′7.04″N 10°9′45.36″E	Protected 1950.
Gylling Rectory; Gylling Præstegård		Fallingvej 1, 8300 Odder	55°53′26.48″N 10°9′53.3″E	Main building. From 1720. Protected 1945.
Gylling Rectory; Gylling Præstegård		Fallingvej 1, 8300 Odder	55°53′26.48″N 10°9′53.3″E	From 1859.
Gylling Rectory; Gylling Præstegård		Fallingvej 3, 8300 Odder	55°53′29.86″N 10°9′53.59″E	Granary. From 1800.
The Monument in Rathlousdal's Park; Monumentet i Rathlousdals Park		Kongshusvej 68B, 8300 Odder	55°57′53.67″N 10°7′23.17″E	Protected 1948.
Randlev Rectory; Randlev Præstegård		Kirkevej 52, 8300 Odder	55°56′40.79″N 10°11′11.65″E	Farmhouse. From 1749. Protected 1950.
Randlev Rectory; Randlev Præstegård		Kirkevej 54, 8300 Odder	55°56′40.12″N 10°11′12.5″E	From 1923.
Randlev Rectory; Randlev Præstegård		Kirkevej 56, 8300 Odder	55°56′39.99″N 10°11′10.18″E	From 1775.
Rodstenseje		Rodstensejevej 10, 8300 Odder	55°57′35″N 10°9′45.08″E	Protected 1918.
Sandager Mill; Sandager Mølle		Møllevej 3, 8300 Odder	55°58′14.24″N 10°8′20.79″E	Water- and steam mill. Protected 1971.
Sandager Mill; Sandager Mølle		Møllevej 5, 8300 Odder	55°58′15.02″N 10°8′20.53″E	Farmhouse.
Uldrupgård		Vads Møllevej 30, 8350 Hundslund	55°53′23.8″N 10°6′4.93″E	Barn and living quarters. From 1810. Protected 1949.
Uldrupgård		Vads Møllevej 30, 8350 Hundslund	55°53′23.8″N 10°6′4.93″E	Barn. From 1810.
Uldrupgård		Vads Møllevej 30, 8350 Hundslund	55°53′23.8″N 10°6′4.93″E	Barn. From 1810.
Uldrupgård		Vads Møllevej 30, 8350 Hundslund	55°53′23.8″N 10°6′4.93″E	Engine house. From 1810.
Åkær		Aakjærvej 100, 8300 Odder	55°54′38.22″N 10°6′22.85″E	Protected 1918.
