= Bovlstrup =

- Village
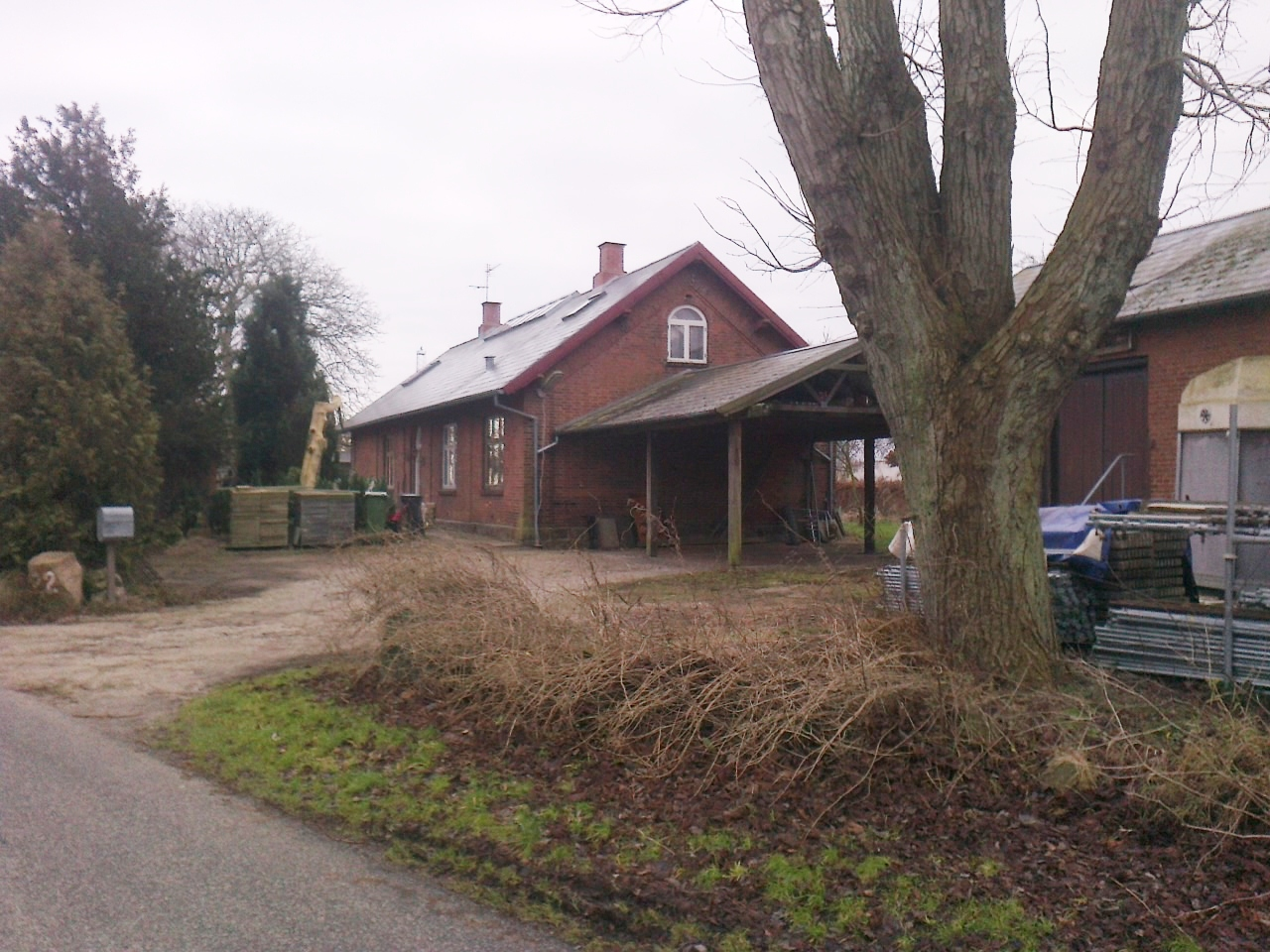
- The former Bovlstrup Station

- Location in the Central Denmark Region
- Coordinates: 55°56′30″N 10°12′58″E
- Country: Denmark
- Region: Central Denmark
- Municipality: Odder

Population (2026)
  - Total: 287
- Time zone: UTC+1 (CET)
  - Summer (DST): UTC+2 (CEST)

Bovlstrup or Boulstrup is a village in Jutland, Denmark. It is located in Odder Municipality of the Central Denmark Region, near the Bay of Aarhus.

== History ==
Early in its history, Borvlstrup contained a warehouse and a customs post.

Bovlstrup Station opened near the village in 1884, as a stop on the Hads-Ning Hundreds' Railroad, connecting Bovlstrup to Hou, Odder and Aarhus. When the Hou-Odder stretch was shut down in 1977, the station in Bovlstrup was shut down as well.
