= Hundslund =

- Village
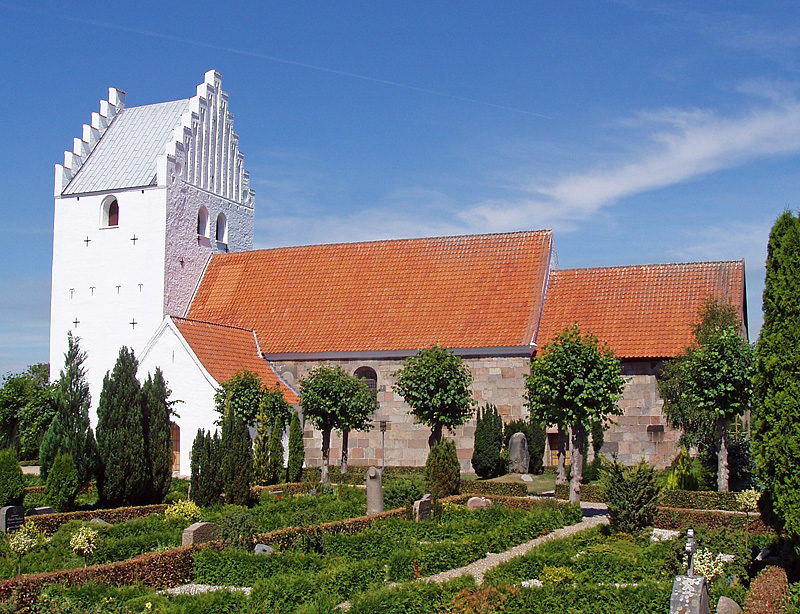
- Hundslund Church

- Location in the Central Denmark Region
- Coordinates: 55°54′55″N 10°03′06″E
- Country: Denmark
- Region: Central Denmark
- Municipality: Odder

Population (2026)
  - Total: 535
- Time zone: UTC+1 (CET)
  - Summer (DST): UTC+2 (CEST)
- Postal code: 8350

Hundslund is a village in Jutland, Denmark. It is located in Odder Municipality 15 km northeast of Horsens and 11 km southwest of Odder.

== Hundslund Church ==
Hundslund Church is located in Hundslund. The nave and choir was built in the 1100, with the church porch built late in the 1400s. The altarpiece was made in 1613 in the former village of Vrold, which has today merged with Skanderborg. The pulpit is from 1600 and the sounding board from around 1700.
