= Saksild =

- Village
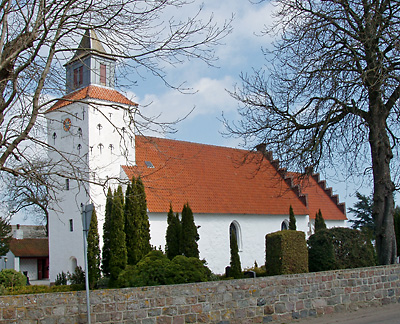
- Saksild Church

- Location in the Central Denmark Region
- Coordinates: 55°58′29″N 10°13′55″E
- Country: Denmark
- Region: Central Denmark
- Municipality: Odder

Population (2026)
  - Total: 910
- Time zone: UTC+1 (CET)
  - Summer (DST): UTC+2 (CEST)

Saksild is a village in Jutland, Denmark. It is located in Odder Municipality.

== History ==
Saksild is first mentioned in 1203 as Saxwæl. Saksild Church was built around year 1200.
