= Tunø =

Danish island in the Kattegat

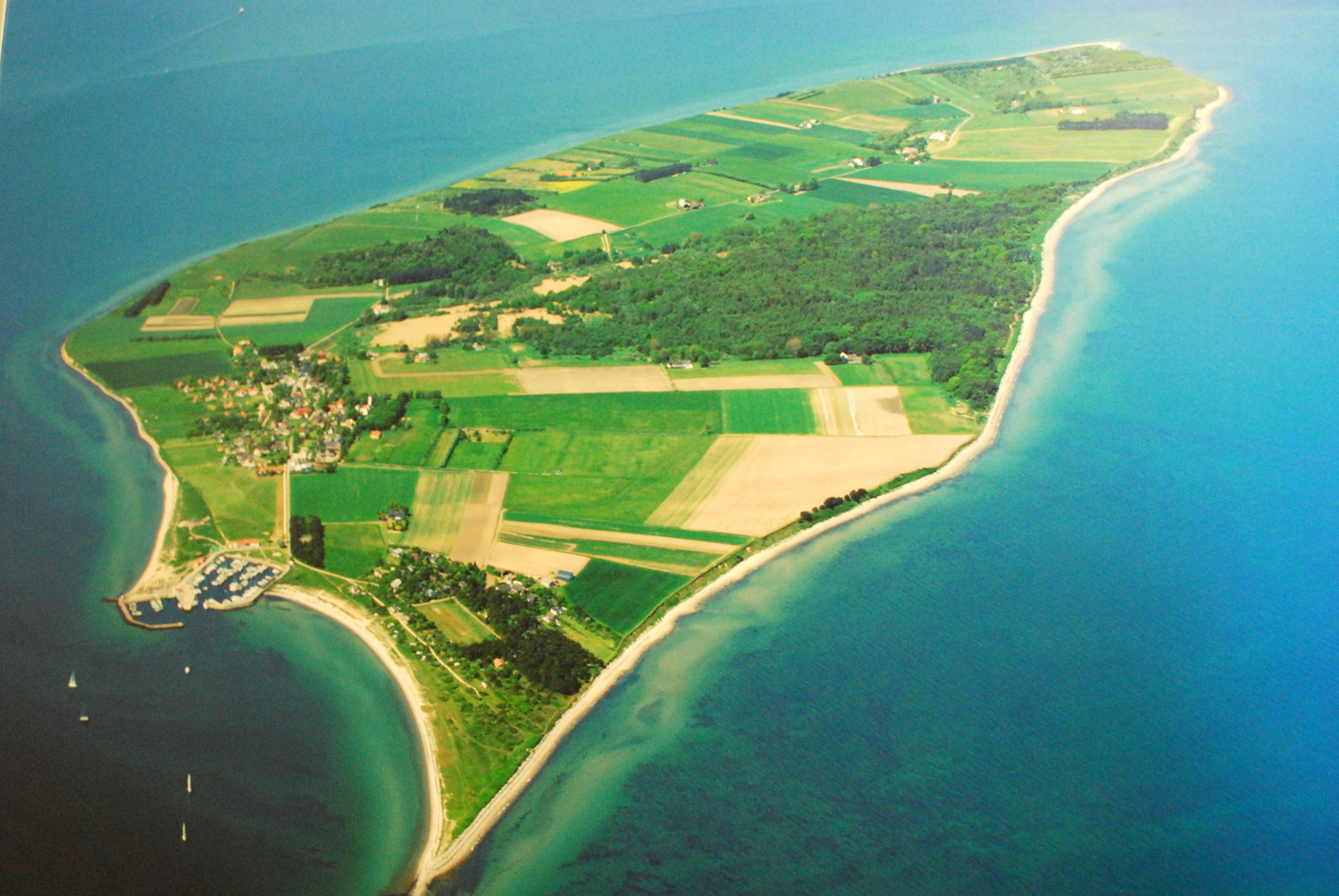
- Aerial photograph of Tunø. North is right.

- Location within Denmark

Geography
- Coordinates: 55°57′8.7″N 10°25′44.6″E
- Area: 3.52 km^{2} (1.36 sq mi)
- Coastline: 9.5 km (5.9 mi)

Administration
- Denmark
- Region: Central Jutland (Midtjylland)
- Municipality: Odder Municipality

Demographics
- Population: 89 (2022)

Additional information
- Time zone: CET (UTC+1)
  - Summer (DST): CEST (UTC+2)
- Postal code: 8300 (Odder)

Tunø is a Danish island in the Kattegat, approximately 4 km west of the neighbouring island of Samsø. The island covers an area of 3.52 square kilometres (1.36 square miles), has a circumference of 9.5 km (5.9 mi) and has total of 66 inhabitants as of November 2022. It comes under the administration of Odder municipality. Tunø By is the only village on the island, with the hamlet of Løkkegårde as the second most populated area.

Tunø harbour, lies a little east of the town of Tunø By, and is protected by 2 piers. The marina here has room for approximately 170 boats. From the harbour there is a daily ferry service to and from the town of Hou, Jutland.

Until 2020 every summer Tunø hosted Tunø Festival, a popular music festival attracting Danish and international artists alike. In 2016, Tunø Festival enjoyed its 30th anniversary.

== Tunø church ==
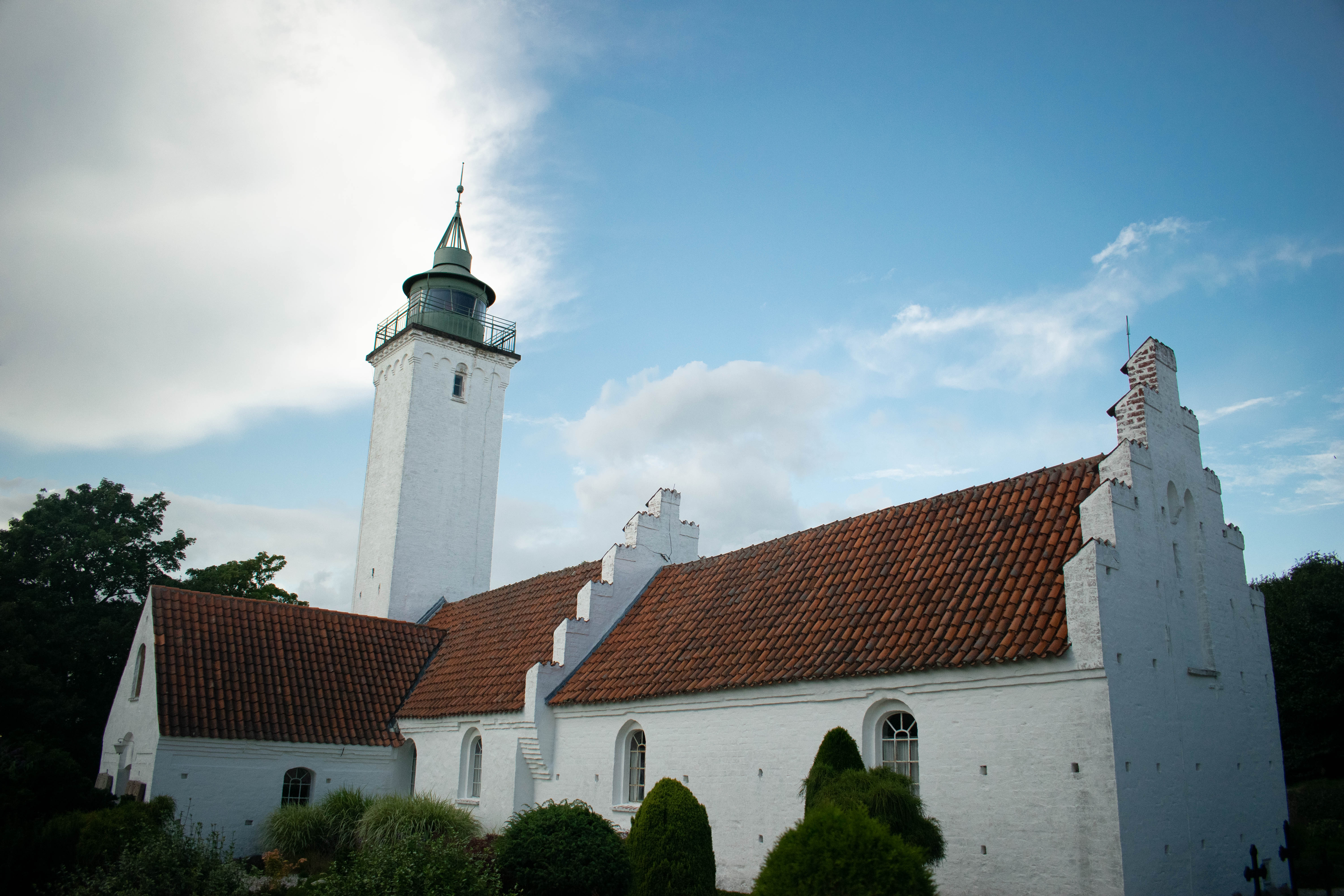
Tunø Church

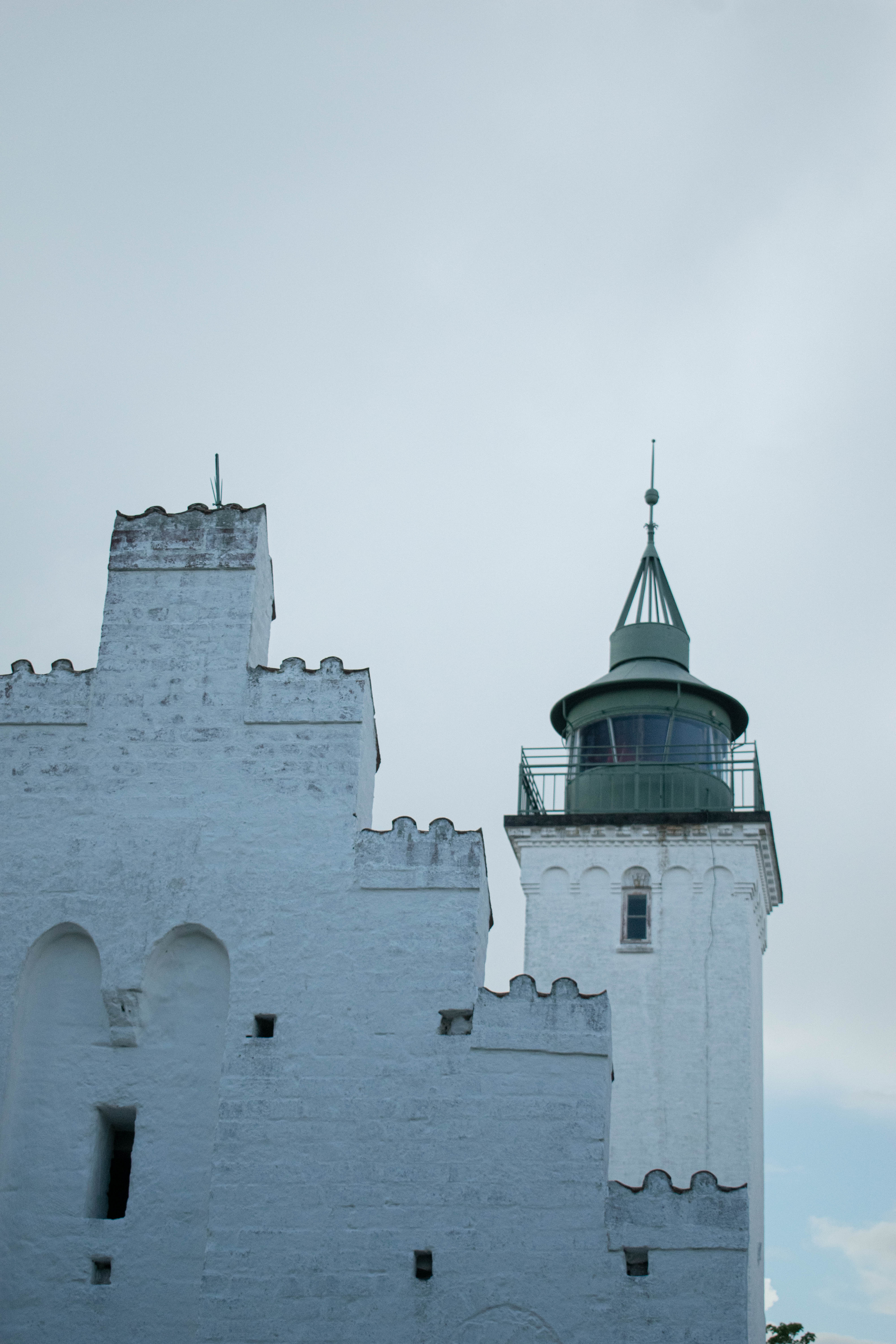
A close up of the Tunø church lightouse tower

Tunø church was most likely built in the 14th century in a Romanesque style, however it has undergone many refurbishments and now stands as a Gothic church with stepped gables or corbie steps. The church is famous for its tower which also functions as a lighthouse. The tower was originally completed in 1801. It was extended to a height of 31 metres (102 feet) above sea level in 1820. The tower was again heightened in 1906 to improve view to and from the lighthouse. In the past the minister would have also served as the lighthouse keeper.

In 1216 the Danish king Valdemar II handed over control of Tunø to the bishop of Aarhus. Inside Tunø church the minister and parish clerk's seats, which date from around 1520, are carved with the coat of arms of Niels Clausen Skade, the then bishop of Aarhus.

The church is adorned with several frescoes and triptychs. The sepulchral tablet on the north wall of the choir has a fresco depicting the vicar Jørgen Hansen, who was said to have been tossed by a bull in 1640. A triptych, with two moveable panels that were painted by evangelists in 1731, is a cupboard altar from around 1490. The triptych depicts the Virgin Mary as heavenly Queen perched on a crescent holding the Baby Jesus in her left arm whilst holding a bunch of grapes in her right hand. The Virgin Mary is flanked by Saint Clemens with an anchor and Saint Alexius. This is believed to be the only depiction of Saint Alexius in Denmark.

It is said that prior to the foundation of the church, Tunø's residents would sail to nearby Samsø to attend Nordby Kirke, whose bricked up northern door is referred to as Tunboernes dør or Tunø islander's door.

== Gallery ==
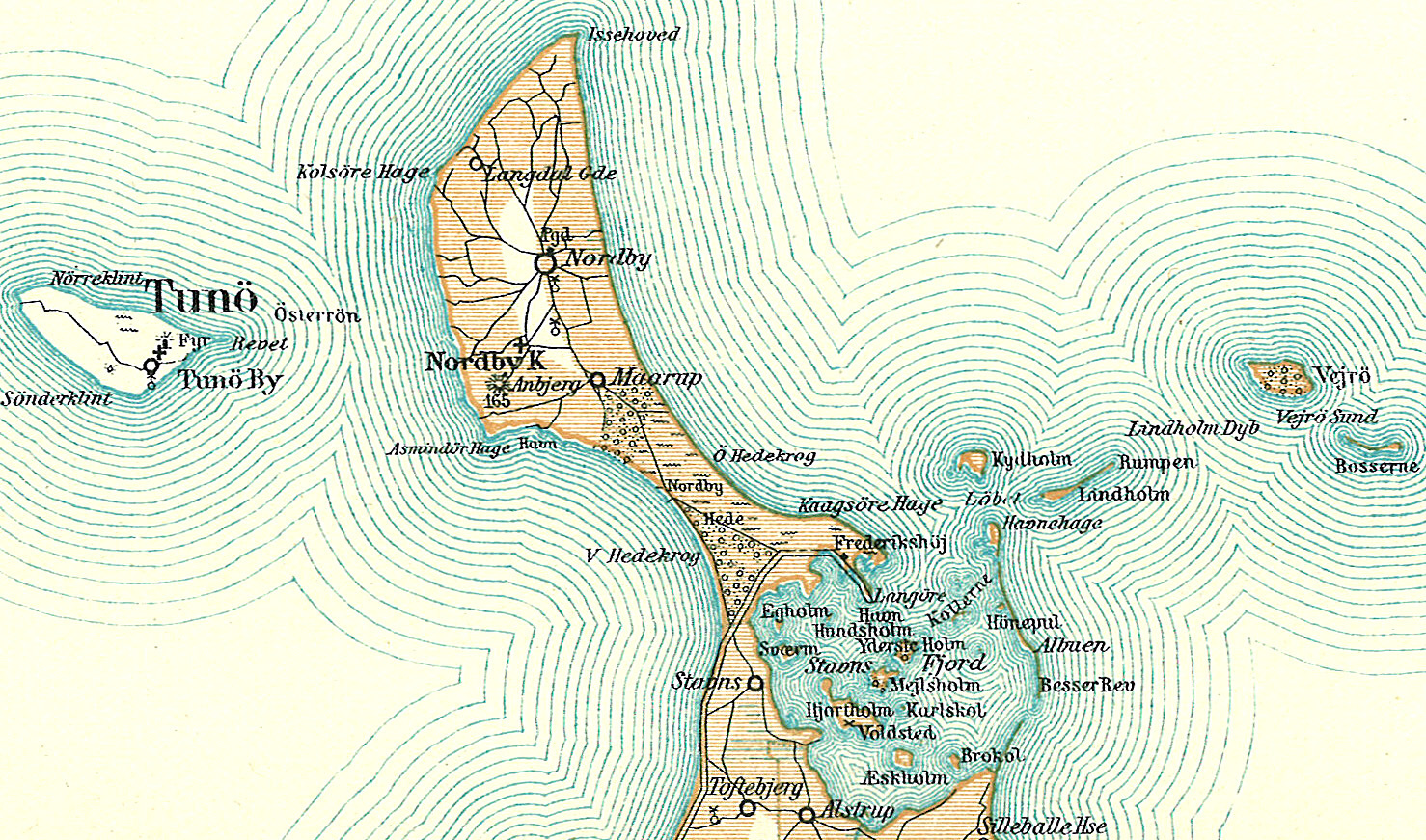
Tunø's placement in relation to Samsø.

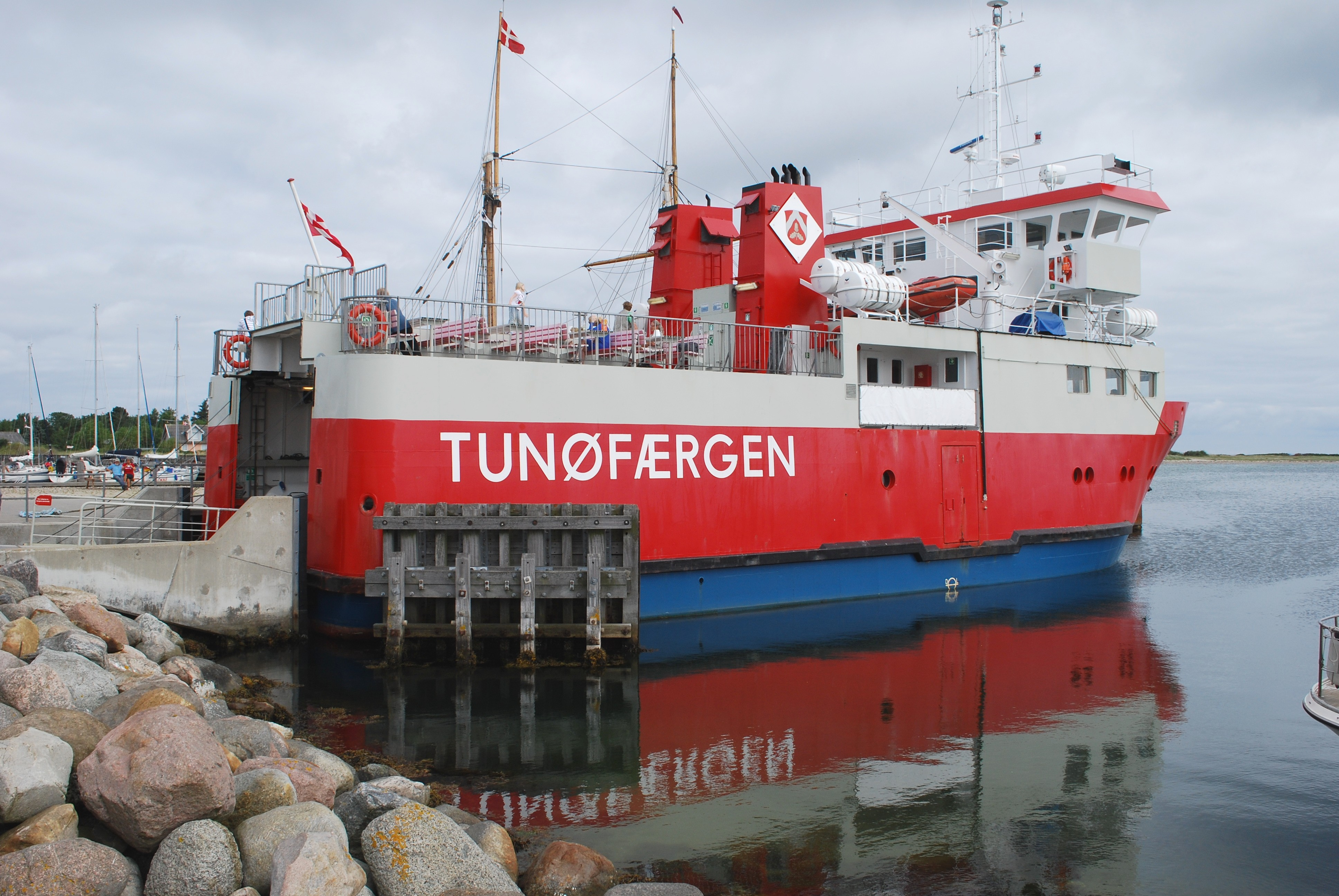
The ferry of Tunøfærgen, connecting with Hou on the mainland.

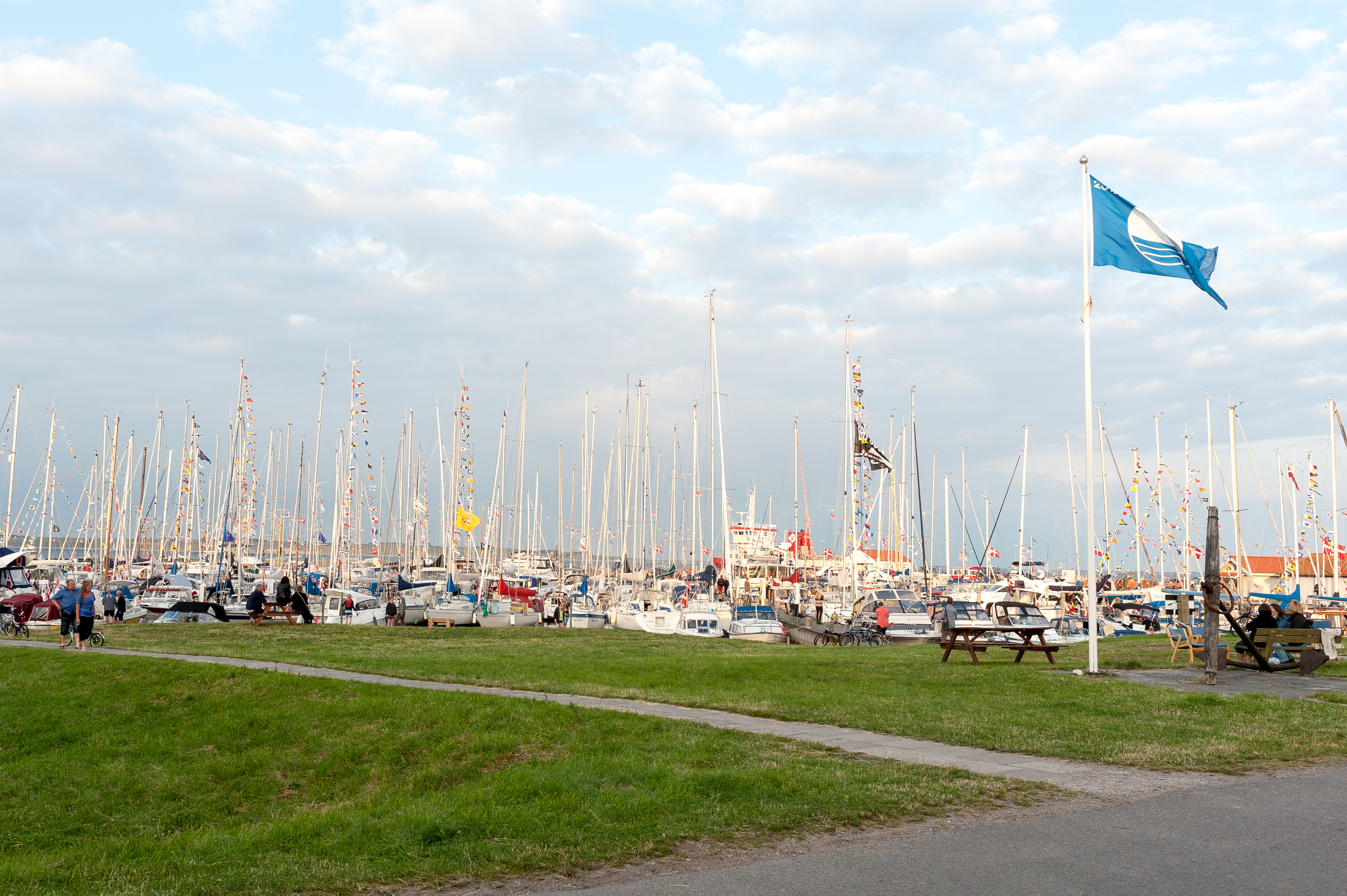
The harbour is often packed with yachts in the summer.

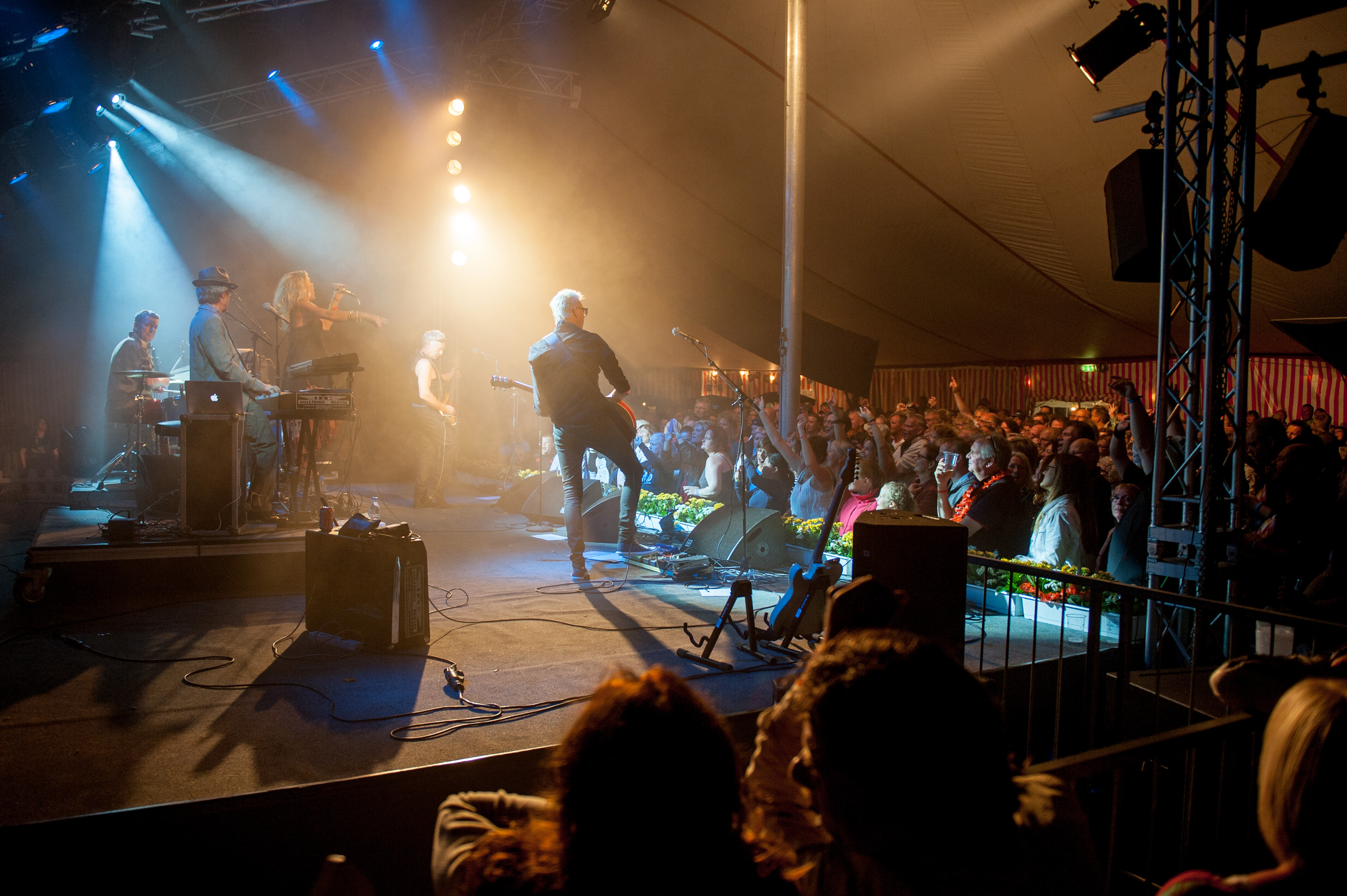
Tunø Festival

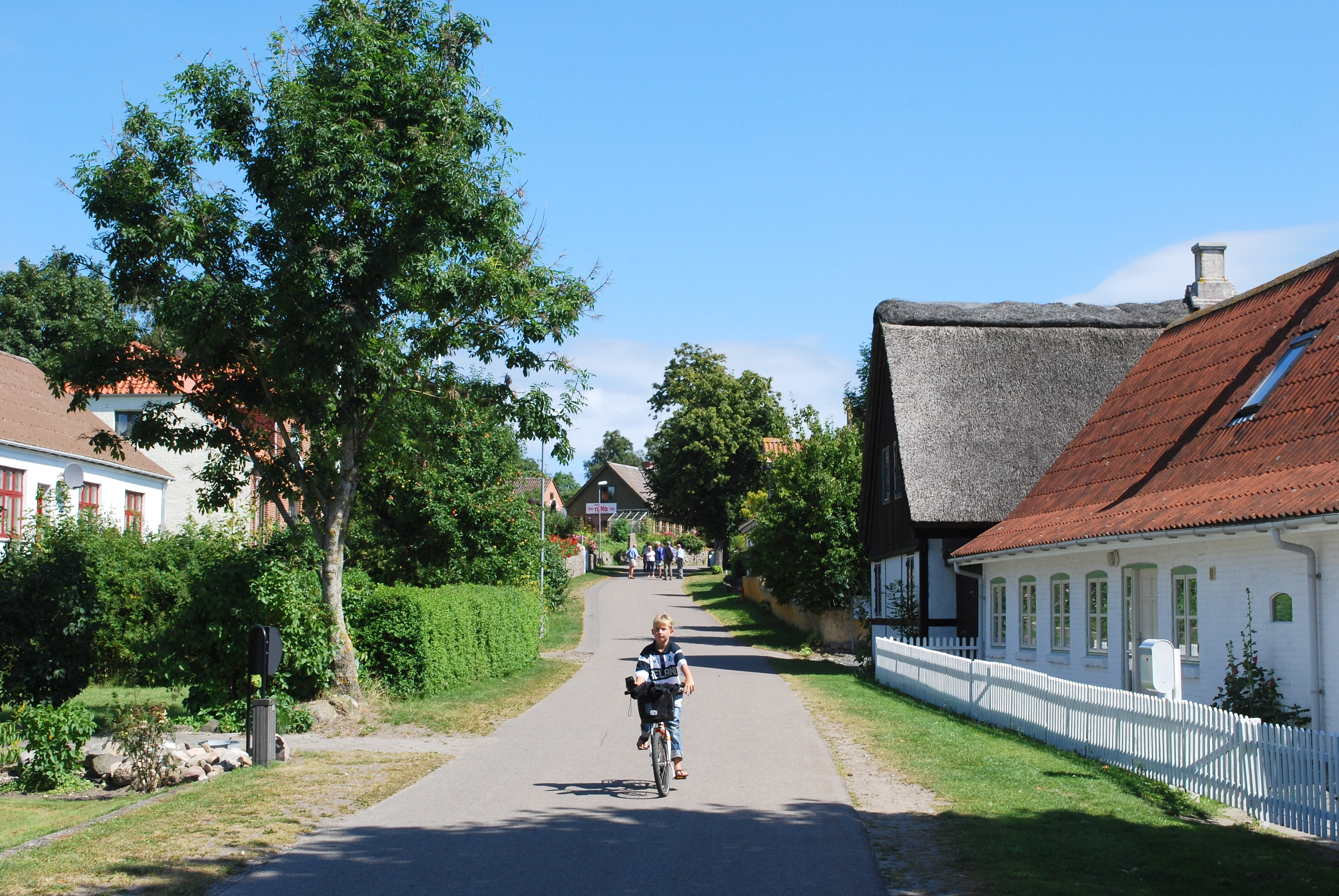
The main road through Tunø By.

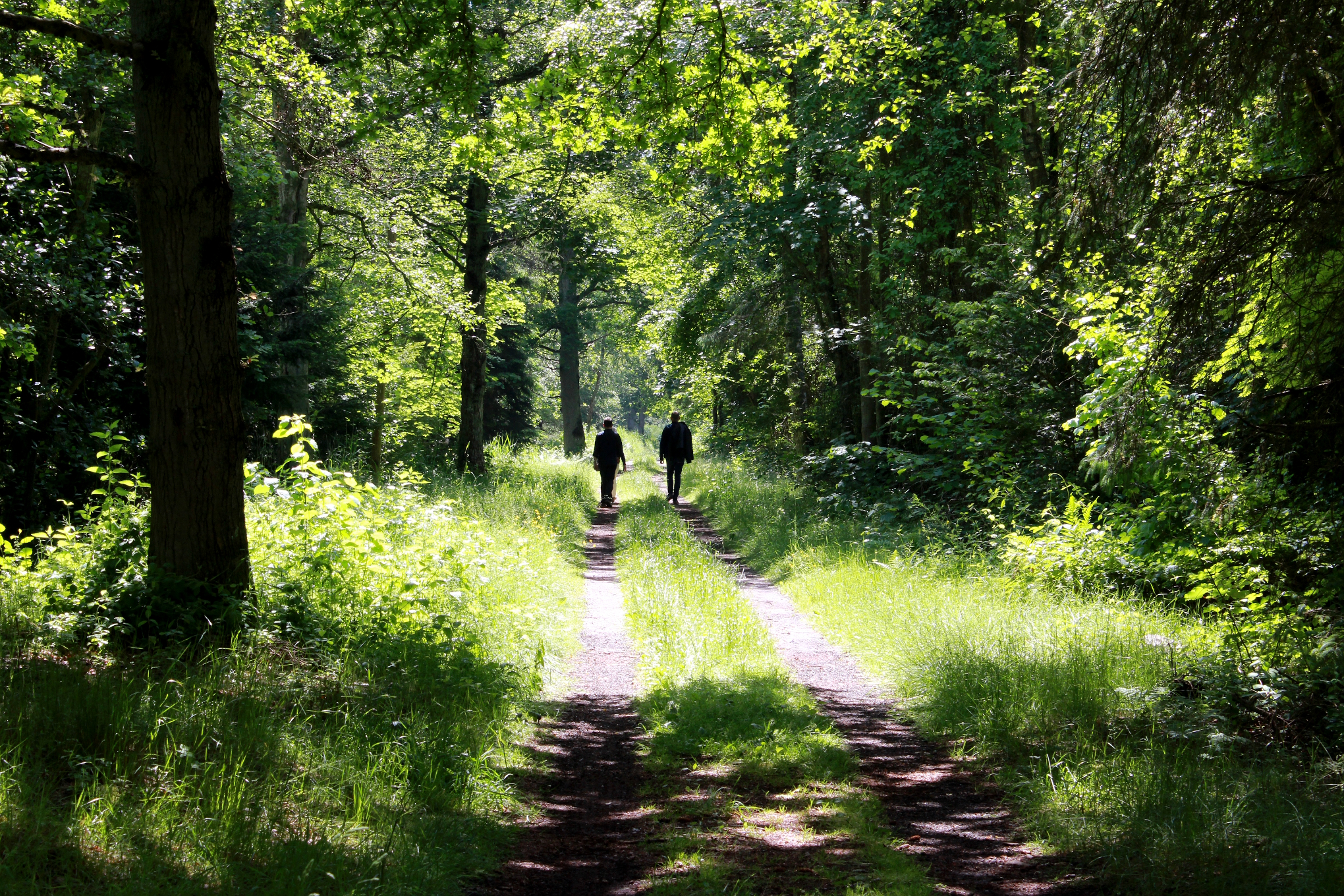
The forest on the northwestern end.

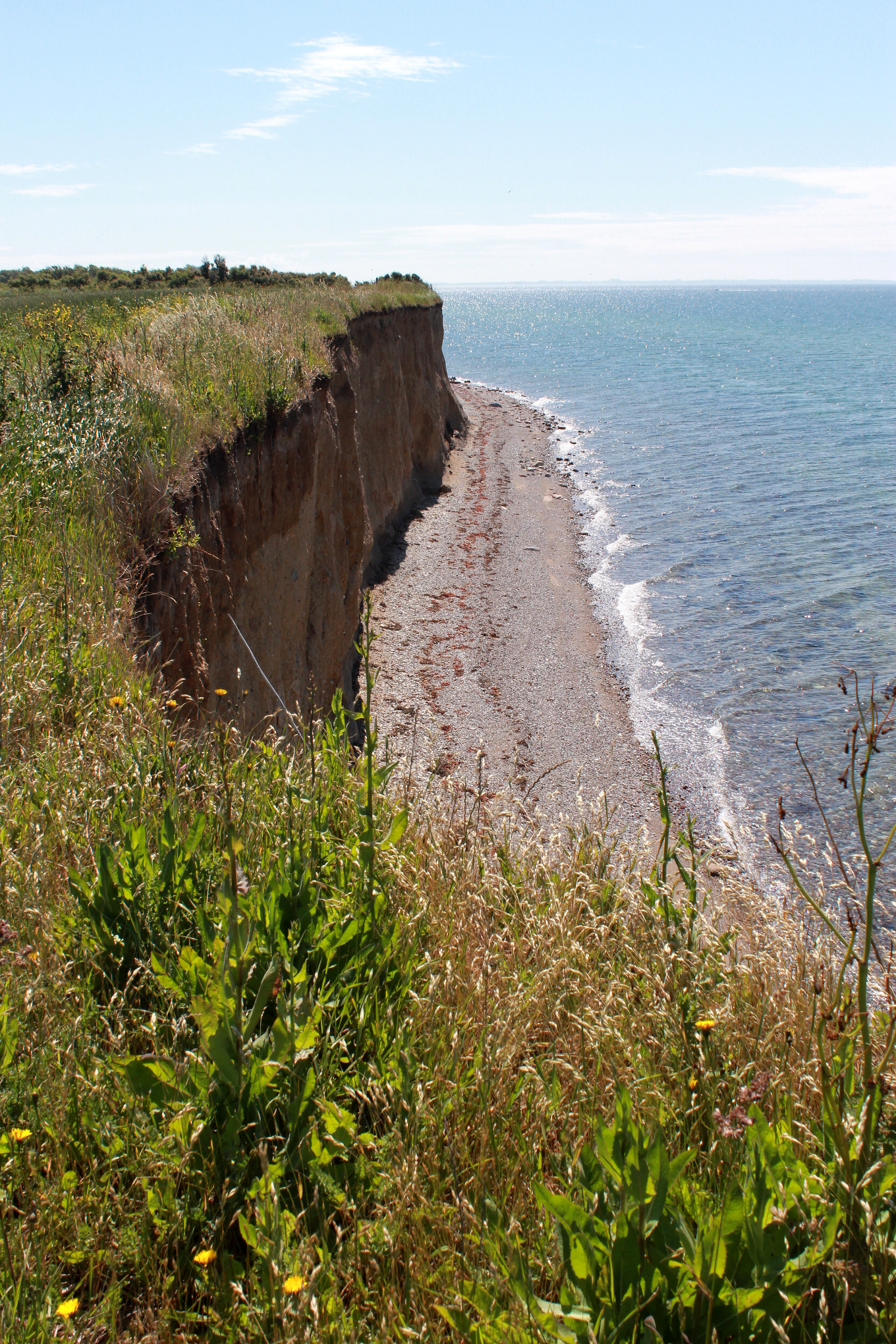
The coasts are mostly steep sandy cliffs, always with a beach below.

== See also ==
- Nearby islands: Endelave, Samsø, Æbelø.
- Nearby cities: Horsens, Odder, Aarhus.
- Tunø Knob Offshore Wind Farm
- List of car-free islands
