= Tunø Knob Offshore Wind Farm =

Wind farm in Denmark

Tunø Knob
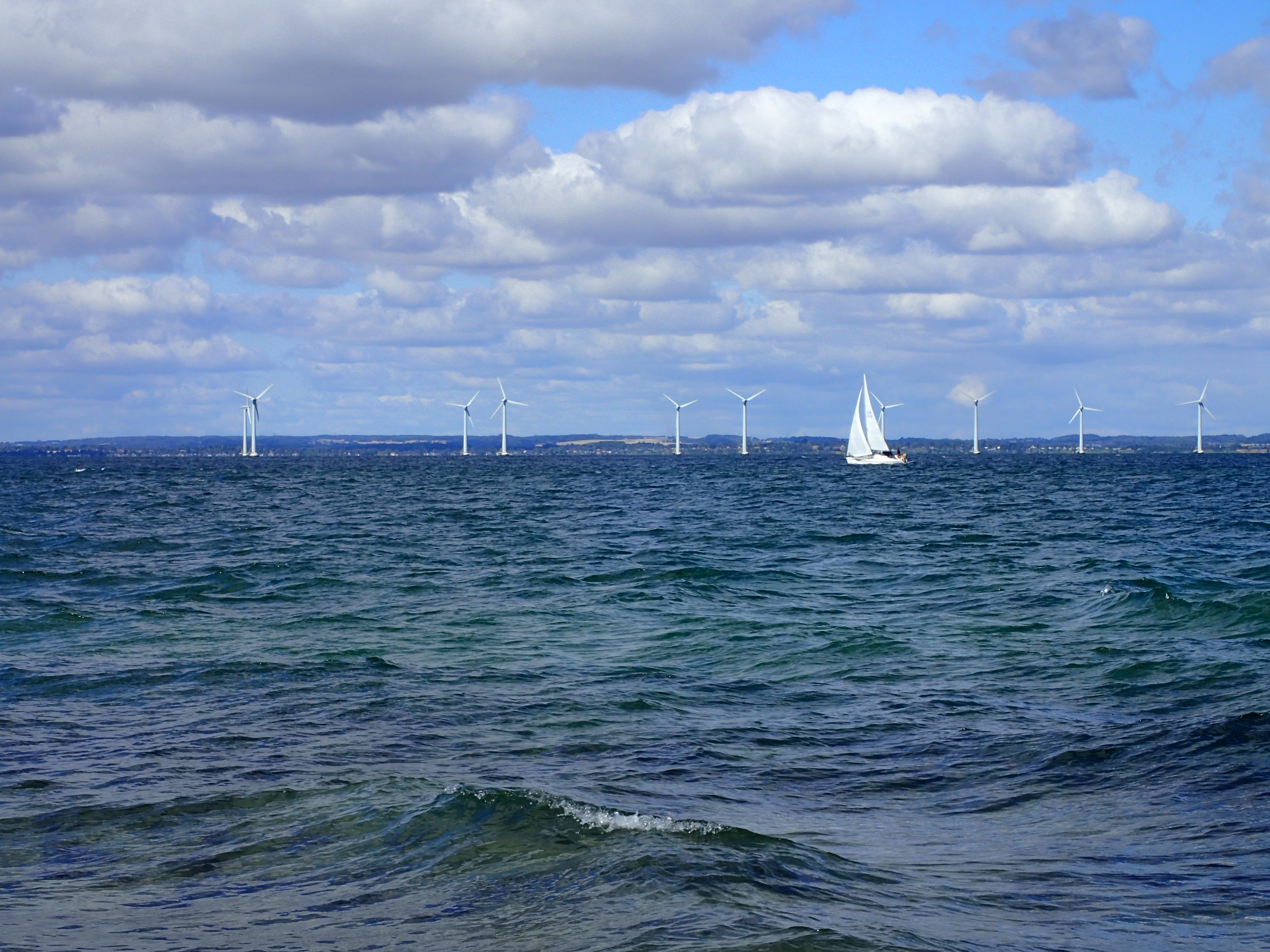
- Tunø Knob Offshore Wind Farm
- Official name: Tunø Knob Offshore Wind Farm
- Country: Denmark
- Location: Odder Municipality
- Coordinates: 55°58′08″N 10°21′22″E
- Status: Operational
- Commission date: 1995
- Construction cost: £10m
- Owner: DONG Energy
- Operator: Eurowind Energy

Wind farm
- Type: Offshore
- Max. water depth: 7 m (23 ft)
- Distance from shore: 6 km (4 mi)
- Rotor diameter: 39 m (128 ft)

Power generation
- Units operational: 10 × 0.5 MW
- Make and model: Vestas V39-500 kW (10)
- Nameplate capacity: 5 MW
- Capacity factor: 29.7%

External links
- Website: Tunoe Knob
- Commons: Related media on Commons

Wind farm layout

Tunø Knob Offshore Wind Farm is an offshore wind farm in the Bay of Aarhus, Denmark. It is located on the sandbar Tunø Knob, west of the Tunø island.

The wind farm was commissioned in 1995 with 10 turbines, each a 500 kW Vestas V39. The turbines are 45 metres high, based on concrete foundations at 3-6 meter deep waters, and together they produce enough electricity to supply c. 2,800 households. The Tunø Knob Offshore Wind Farm was the first offshore wind farm by Danish wind turbine company Vestas.

== See also ==
- Wind power in Denmark
- List of offshore wind farms in Denmark
