= Neder Randlev =

- Village
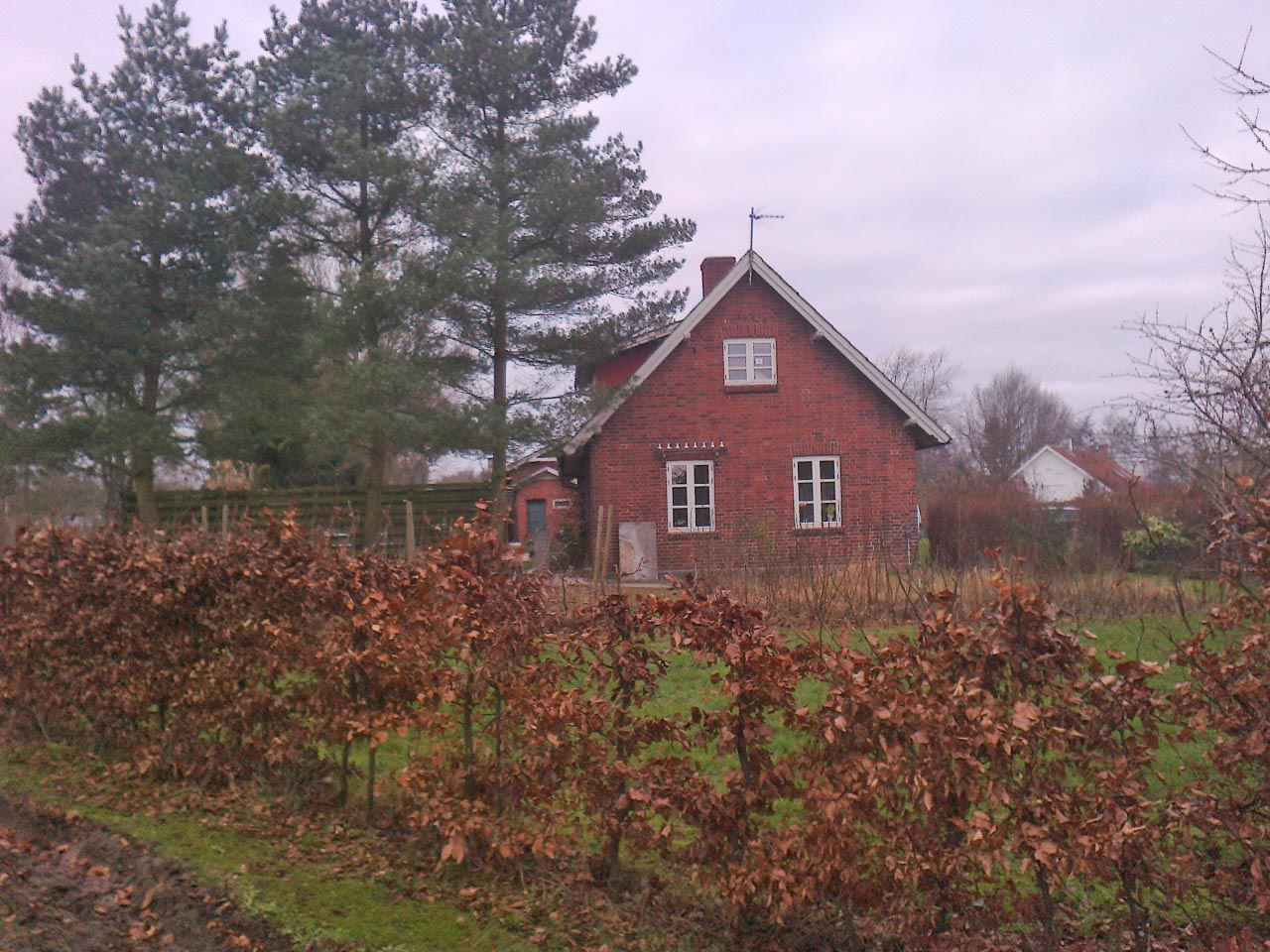
- Neder Randlev Station

- Location in the Central Denmark Region
- Coordinates: 55°57′25″N 10°11′20″E
- Country: Denmark
- Region: Central Denmark
- Municipality: Odder

Population (2026)
  - Total: 201
- Time zone: UTC+1 (CET)
  - Summer (DST): UTC+2 (CEST)

Neder Randlev is a village in Jutland, Denmark. It is located in Odder Municipality.
