= Gylling (Odder Municipality) =

- Village
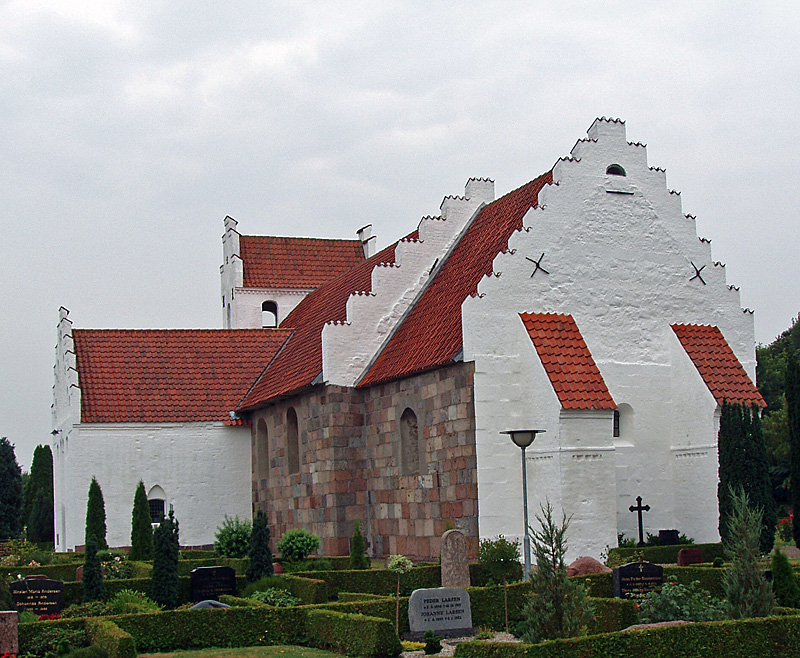
- Gylling Church

- Location in the Central Denmark Region
- Coordinates: 55°53′26″N 10°9′59″E
- Country: Denmark
- Region: Central Denmark
- Municipality: Odder

Population (2026)
  - Total: 640
- Time zone: UTC+1 (CET)
  - Summer (DST): UTC+2 (CEST)

Gylling is a village in Jutland, Denmark. It is located in Odder Municipality.

== History ==
Gylling Church was built in the later half of the 1100s.

Gylling in 1688 consisted of 22 farms and 33 half-farms, with six houses with land and two houses without land. The total cultivated area was 854.2 barrels of land yielding 154.37 barrels of grains.

== Notable people ==
- Karen Jeppe (1876 — 1935), social worker known for her work with Ottoman Armenian refugees and survivors of the Armenian Genocide, mainly widows and orphans, from 1903 until her death in Syria in 1935.
- Mogens Jeppesen (born 1953), handball player
