= Hou (Odder Municipality) =

- Town
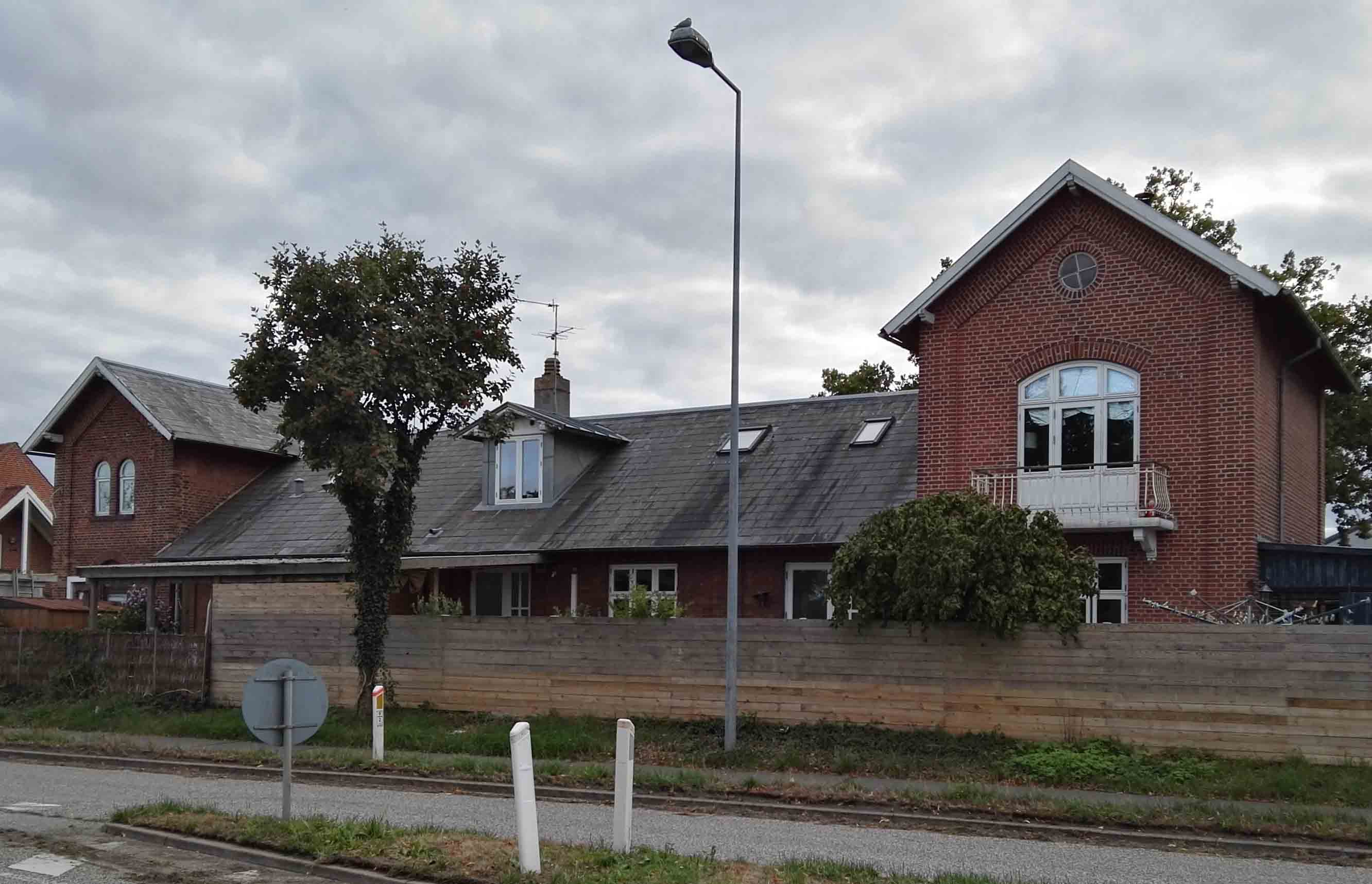
- The former Hou Station

- Location in the Central Denmark Region
- Coordinates: 55°55′03″N 10°15′20″E
- Country: Denmark
- Region: Central Denmark
- Municipality: Odder

Area
  - Total: 1.31 km^{2} (0.51 sq mi)

Population (2026)
  - Total: 1,778
  - Density: 1,221/km^{2} (3,160/sq mi)
- Time zone: UTC+1 (CET)
  - Summer (DST): UTC+2 (CEST)

Hou or Hov is a town in Jutland, Denmark. It is located in Odder Municipality.

== Etymology ==
The name is known from 1608 where the area was called Haa Havn, indicating the presence of a harbour even before the town existed.

In 2019 a vote among the citizens of Hou was initiated, in order to determine whether the official spelling of the town should be Hou or Hov. With 844 votes for Hou and 44 votes for Hov, the official spelling was determined to be Hou. Mayor of the municipality, Uffe Jensen, put up new signs with the new spelling later in the year.

== History ==
The first residential building in Hou was built in 1837. The town grew up around the harbour, and in 1853 a granary was built on the harbour. A school was built in 1870. A ferry route between Hou and Aarhus began in 1873. In 1884, the Hads-Ning Hundreds' Railroad was established, connecting Hou to Odder and Aarhus. The Odder-Hou stretch of the Odder Line was shut down in 1977.
