= Mogens Jeppesen =

Danish handball player (born 1953)

Personal information
- Nationality: Danish
- Born: 10 July 1953 (age 73) Gylling
- Height: 187 cm (74 in)

Sport
- Sport: Handball
- Position: Goalkeeper

Senior clubs
- Years: Team
- –: Fredericia KFUM
- –: Ribe HK
National team
| Years | Team | Apps | (Gls) |
| 1973-1987 | Denmark | 141 | (0) |

Mogens Jeppesen (born July 10, 1953) is a Danish former handball player who played for Fredericia KFUM and Ribe HK, as well as the Danish national team. With Fredericia he won 5 Danish Championships in a row.

In 1987 won the Danish male player of the year award.

He competed in the 1980 Summer Olympics and in the 1984 Summer Olympics. In 1980 he was part of the Danish team which finished ninth in the Olympic tournament. He played all six matches as goalkeeper. Four years later he finished fourth with the Danish team in the 1984 Olympic tournament. He played all six match as goalkeeper again.
