= Alrø =

Island in Denmark

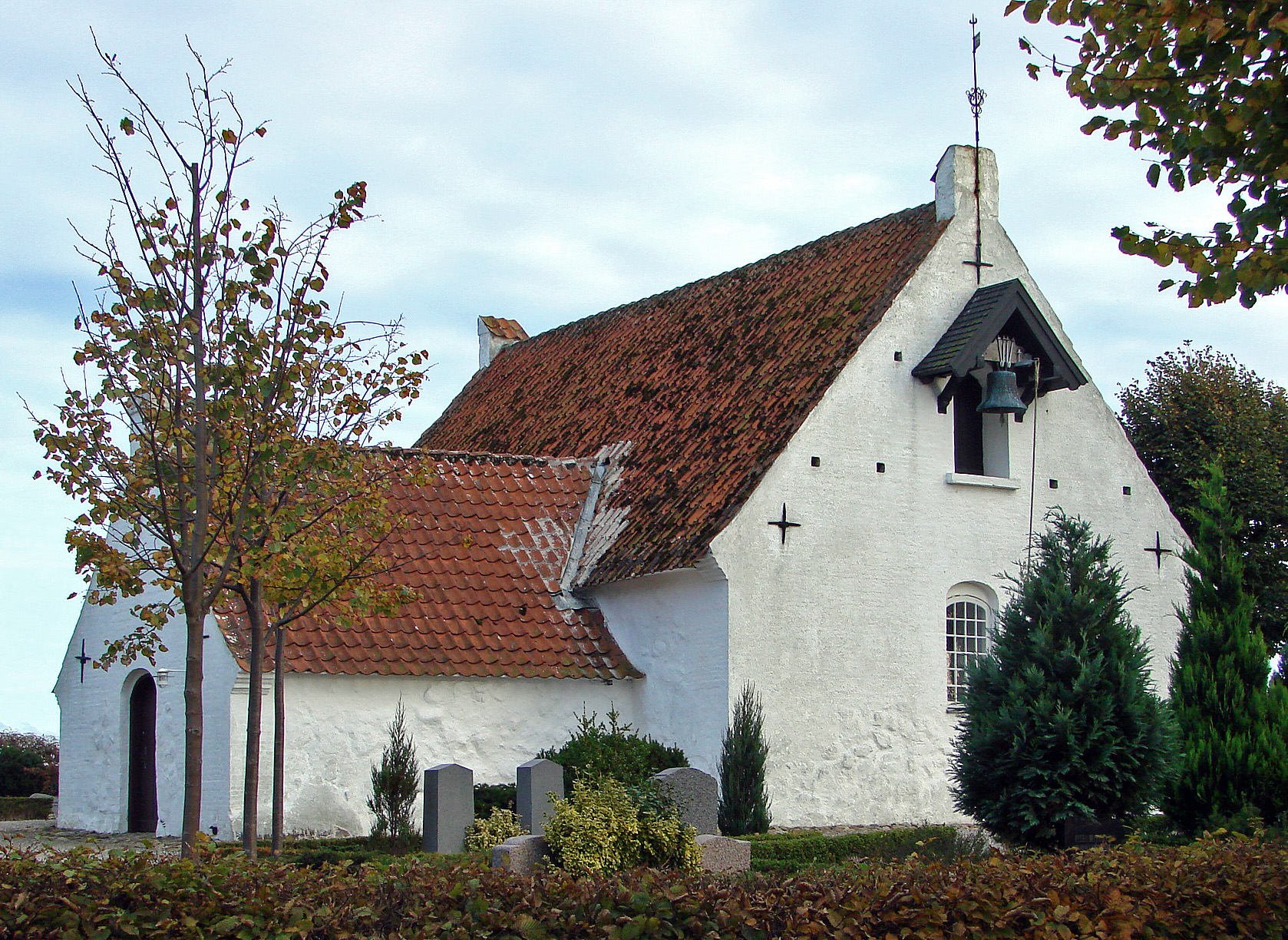
- Alrø Church

- Location within Denmark

Geography
- Location: Horsens Fjord
- Coordinates: 55°51′35″N 10°03′57″E
- Area: 7.5 km^{2} (2.9 sq mi)

Administration
- Denmark
- Region: Central Denmark Region
- Municipality: Odder Municipality

Demographics
- Population: 140 (2025)
- Pop. density: 21.3/km^{2} (55.2/sq mi)

Alrø is a small Danish island in Horsens Fjord on the east coast of Jutland within Odder Municipality.The island is 7.52 km long with a coastline of 14 km, and stretches a little over 5 km wide from east to west. With a population of 140 as of January 2025, the island can be reached by road over an artificial causeway which connects it to the mainland on the northern side of the fjord. Alrø has been inhabited continuously since the Stone Age up to modern times, with possible additional usage during the Viking Age as a landing site.

== History ==
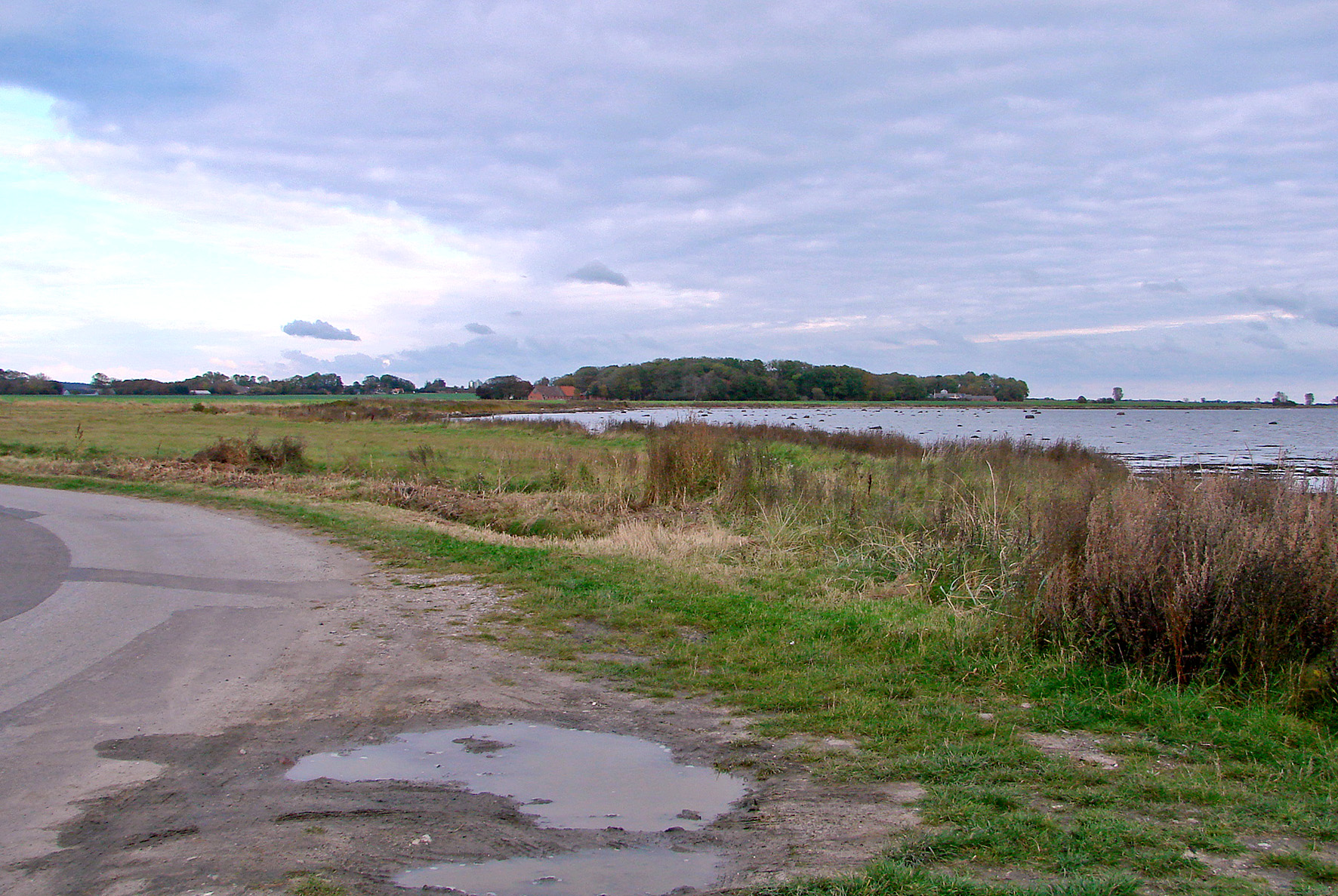
Alrø from the south-west

According to legend, chieftain King Hjarne of Hjarnø gave the island to his wife Queen Alrune, naming the island Alrø after her. The first historical reference to Alrø is in King Valdemar's land register Jordbog, under a single sentence “Alrø.House. Hare.” In later years, Alrø became a popular hare hunting site for the king. The population of Alrø consisted primarily of peasants under the jurisdiction of wealthy farmers until 1661, when King Frederik III gave the island and Endelave to Nields Banner, who was his Crown vassal. In 1700, Just Rosemeier from Westphalia gained ownership of Alrø through marriage, and allotted many farms to families on the island. In 1798, the peasants became freeholders of the land and began to farm, where they settled in three main sections of the island.

Until 1970, the island had its own school, library, shops, filling station and bus service but today, as a result of the small population, they no longer exist. Today, the main residential area is 2.5 km long and is located on the island's highest point. The original island farms were established in this area, before spreading closer to the coast.

== Archaeological Excavation ==
While an earlier exploratory excavation was conducted in the early 1980s, most recently excavation was conducted along the southwestern coast of Alrø in 2013 after metal detector finds showed signs of activity. The excavation was conducted using traditional archaeological methods with digital solutions (including 3D photographs) by archaeologists from the Moesgård Museum and the Harvard Summer School Viking Studies Program.

Before excavation began, photographs were taken by archaeologists from the Moesgård Museum of the southwestern coast line and the dig site. The photographs were created using geomagnetic/magnetometer surveying, displaying anything that may lie beneath the top layer of soil. The preliminary excavation featured two test trenches that included Stone Age fire pits and what appeared to be dark soil spots for Viking Age or Iron Age pit houses for a settlement. Upon excavation, no pit houses were found, while several fire pits were found across the site. The metal detector findings showed a concentration of artifacts from the Bronze Age, Iron Age, Viking Age, and Medieval period (1700BC-1400AD). These artifacts show that people have inhabited the island for thousands of years, but all for short periods of time across different prehistoric periods.

Artifacts were found across the excavation site and in the fields behind the site with no discernible pattern. The oldest flint tools that were found, fragments of flint axes, are from around 3500BC. The fireplaces excavated were from the late Bronze Age or early Iron Age (approximately 1000BC-200AD). The charcoal that was found in the fireplaces is awaiting carbon-14 dating, but the charcoal originally came from oak wood. Soil samples were taken from the pits and are waiting for carbon-14 dating and for chemical analysis to determine the function of the fire pits. Potsherds were found across the site, but are not able to give any precise dating. Several Viking Age and Iron Age fibulas were found, along with a Viking Age Dirham coin that would have been used for trade. Metal detector finds were also located in the fields near a spot where a lake once existed.

== Theories ==
Alrø is believed to have been a landing site throughout prehistory, providing a link between seafaring and settlements. Due to Alrø's prime location by the sea, it is believed that the island could have been used as either a look-out post or a resting place between travels.

Landing sites can be identified based on their topographical and archaeological features. Alrø's topography includes a flat coast, with an original coastline that may stretch further into Alrø Sund than it currently does. The archaeological remains that are characteristic of a landing site include pottery and fire craft items, such as metalwork. Many pieces of pottery were found across the excavation site at Alrø that are unable to be dated precisely, with one piece possibly being from the Renaissance era. Metalwork was found along the site, including a silver ring buckle and bronze fibulas, which make up the characteristics of a landing site.

If Alrø was indeed a landing site, the island could have been used as a lookout post for naval ships. The island would have been at a strategically advantageous position in the Horsens fjord, as from Alrø one can see across Alrø Sund to the islands Hjarnø and Snaptun on the southwestern coast and to the mainland on the northeastern coast. These other islands would have also been prominent for seafaring and possibly trade, based on the archaeological discoveries of Hjarnø's settlement and ship setting burials and the Snaptun Stone with a depiction of Loki that was found along the coast of Snaptun.

Alrø could have possibly been used as a resting place for trade, as resting places are often found along the coast with a natural harbor. These places would allow traders and sailors to rest between their travels and exchange goods. Resting places are also found on small islands with limited populations that have a small threat of attacks from the locals. Due to the lack of settlement evidence as of thus far on Alrø, the island's coast very well could have been used as a resting place.

== See also ==
- List of islands of Denmark
