= 2025 Odder municipal election =

← 2021	18 November 2025	2029 →

All 19 seats to the Odder municipal council 10 seats needed for a majority
- Turnout: 14,477 (75.5%) ▲0.7%
	First party	Second party	Third party
	A	C	V
Party	Social Democrats	Conservatives	Venstre
Last election	5 seats, 25.2%	2 seats, 13.5%	7 seats, 31.1%
Seats won	6	5	4
Seat change	▲1	▲3	▼3
Popular vote	3,531	3,031	3,028
Percentage	24.8%	21.3%	21.3%
Swing	▼0.4%	▲7.8%	▼9.8%
	Fourth party	Fifth party	Sixth party
	F	Ø	B
Party	Green Left	Red-Green Alliance	Social Liberals
Last election	1 seat, 5.8%	2 seats, 11.5%	2 seats, 8.5%
Seats won	2	2	0
Seat change	▲1	0	▼2
Popular vote	1,586	1,356	554
Percentage	11.1%	9.5%	3.9%
Swing	▲5.3%	▼2.0%	▼4.7%
Mayor before election
Lone Jakobi
Social Democrats
Mayor after election
Lone Jakobi
Social Democrats

The 2025 Odder Municipal election will be held on November 18, 2025, to elect the 19 members to sit in the regional council for the Odder Municipal council, in the period of 2026 to 2029. Lone Jakobi from the Social Democrats, would secure re-election.

== Background ==
Following the 2021 election, Lone Jakobi from Social Democrats became mayor for her first term. She would run for a second term.

== Electoral system ==
For elections to Danish municipalities, a number varying from 9 to 31 are chosen to be elected to the municipal council. The seats are then allocated using the D'Hondt method and a closed list proportional representation. Odder Municipality had 19 seats in 2025.

== Electoral alliances ==
=== Electoral Alliance 1 ===
Party		Political alignment
A	Social Democrats	Centre-left
B	Social Liberals	Centre to Centre-left
F	Green Left	Centre-left to Left-wing
M	Moderates	Centre to Centre-right
Ø	Red-Green Alliance	Left-wing to Far-Left

=== Electoral Alliance 2 ===
Party		Political alignment
C	Conservatives	Centre-right
I	Liberal Alliance	Centre-right to Right-wing
V	Venstre	Centre-right

== Results by polling station ==
Division	A	B	C	F	I	M	O	V	Ø
Division	%	%	%	%	%	%	%	%	%
Odder (Spektrum Odder)	26.4	4.2	19.1	12.0	3.7	0.4	3.8	21.1	9.2
Torrild	3.5	2.6	31.7	4.8	2.2	0.0	3.2	41.7	10.3
Saksild - Nølev	21.6	4.0	20.8	13.7	3.4	0.6	4.2	19.5	12.1
Randlev - Bjerager	28.7	4.0	17.8	9.7	3.0	0.3	3.6	20.1	13.0
Hou, Gosmer - Halling	30.1	3.6	15.7	9.6	5.9	0.1	2.4	23.9	8.7
Gylling	12.5	1.7	44.5	13.1	2.5	0.5	6.8	12.7	5.7
Ørting-Falling	22.7	2.1	31.5	8.1	3.3	1.0	6.6	17.0	7.7
Hundslund	20.4	4.8	22.9	7.3	3.0	0.4	5.9	23.5	11.8
Alrø	12.2	4.1	41.8	5.1	4.1	0.0	1.0	22.4	9.2
Tunø	31.4	0.0	15.7	3.9	2.0	2.0	0.0	35.3	9.8

== Results ==
Party		Votes	%	+/-	Seats	+/-
Odder Municipality
A	Social Democrats	3,531	24.79	-0.37	6	+1
C	Conservatives	3,031	21.28	+7.78	5	+3
V	Venstre	3,028	21.26	-9.83	4	-3
F	Green Left	1,586	11.13	+5.34	2	+1
Ø	Red-Green Alliance	1,356	9.52	-2.02	2	0
O	Danish People's Party	573	4.02	+2.69	0	0
B	Social Liberals	554	3.89	-4.66	0	-2
I	Liberal Alliance	529	3.71	New	0	New
M	Moderates	56	0.39	New	0	New
Total		14,244	100	N/A	19	N/A
Invalid votes		39	0.20	+0.04		
Blank votes		194	1.01	+0.40		
Turnout		14,477	75.53	+0.74		
Source: valg.dk

== Opinion polls ==
Polling firm	Fieldwork date	Sample size	V	A	C	Ø	B	F	O	I	M	Lead
Epinion	4 Sep - 13 Oct 2025	516	15.4	30.8	14.2	12.0	2.4	13.6	4.4	5.1	1.3	15.4
2024 european parliament election	9 Jun 2024		16.1	17.6	8.1	6.2	6.5	19.0	5.2	5.4	6.4	1.4
2022 general election	1 Nov 2022		13.8	29.5	5.0	5.0	3.3	10.0	1.7	7.4	8.7	15.7
2021 regional election	16 Nov 2021		20.6	33.5	9.1	10.8	5.8	9.4	2.3	0.9	–	12.9
2021 municipal election	16 Nov 2021		31.1 (7)	25.2 (5)	13.5 (2)	11.5 (2)	8.5 (2)	5.8 (1)	1.3 (0)	–	–	5.9
