= Elvin J. Hansen =

Danish politician (born 1950)

Mayor of Odder Municipality
- In office 1 January 1998 – 31 December 2005
- Preceded by: Iver Tesdorpf (C)
- Succeeded by: Niels-Ulrik Bugge (V)

Mayor of Odder Municipality
- In office 1 January 2010 – 31 December 2013
- Preceded by: Niels-Ulrik Bugge (V)
- Succeeded by: Uffe Jensen (V)

Personal details
- Born: Elvin Jørgen Hansen; 1 May 1950 (age 75) Torrild, Denmark
- Party: Social Democrats
- Occupation: Politician, production manager

Elvin Jørgen Hansen (born 1 May 1950) is a Danish politician from the Social Democrats. He served as mayor of Odder Municipality from 1998 to 2005 and again from 2010 to 2013. Hansen was a member of the municipal council from 1986 until the 2021 local elections, when he chose not to stand for re-election.

== Early life and career ==
Hansen was born in Torrild in Odder Municipality. He trained as a machine operator and BF-tekniker through courses at Norsax, at TDC and in evening school. Alongside his political work he was employed for many years by the telecommunications company TDC, where he worked as a production manager.

== Political career ==
=== Municipal politics in Odder ===
Hansen was first elected to Odder Municipality's municipal council in 1986. Over the course of his tenure he was closely associated with the municipality's technical and planning policy, including infrastructure and land-use issues. He served as mayor from 1998 to 2005 and again from 2010 to 2013.

Between 2007 and 2009 he chaired the municipality's technical committee and sat on the finance committee. During the discussions leading up to Denmark's 2007 municipal reform he briefly floated the idea that parts of Aarhus Municipality, in particular the suburban area of Beder-Malling just north of the municipal boundary, could be merged with Odder, which at the time had only just over 20,000 inhabitants. The proposal, later described as largely tongue-in-cheek, was never seriously considered, especially not in Aarhus.

In late 2010 he attracted national public attention after requesting a salary increase, arguing that the mayoral salary was significantly lower than that of the municipal director despite greater responsibility. The request was controversial due to the municipality's strained finances and recent staff layoffs, and the local Social Democratic board publicly distanced itself from his remarks.

During his second mayoral term, Odder Municipality became one of the first in Europe to distribute iPads to all pupils from kindergarten through lower secondary school, as well as to teachers and pedagogues. The initiative was presented by Hansen as part of the municipality's digitalisation strategy and as a way to strengthen inclusion and prepare children for a digital society.

He also oversaw the adoption of the digital Kommuneplan 2013–2025, which outlined Odder's long-term strategy for urban development, business growth, infrastructure, and green areas and continued the municipality's transition to digital planning processes that had begun under his earlier tenure.

=== Regional politics ===
Hansen left municipal politics in 2021, and instead ran for the Central Denmark Region council that year, but was not elected. As the first alternate, he participated in meetings and took over the seat of Ditte Fredensborg in December 2024 due to her work commitments. He ran again in the 2025 regional elections but was once more not elected.

== Other offices and board memberships ==
Alongside his elected offices, Hansen has held a number of chair and board positions in local and regional companies and institutions. He has served as chair of the intermunicipal waste management company Renosyd in two periods and as its vice-chair in four periods, chair of the Odder Produktionshøjskole for 24 years, chair of the Daghøjskole in Odder, and chair of the Boulstrup–Hov Kraftvarmeværk. He has also been vice-chair of the Association of Danish combined heat and power plants, a board member of HMN Naturgas and a representative in the assemblies of Østjysk Energi (later AURA), TV 2 Østjylland and the Realdania foundation.

== Personal life ==
Hansen lives in the coastal town of Hou, south-east of Odder. In 1973, he met his future wife, Gerda, to whom he was married until her death in 2019; the couple have three children. Following his wife's death he entered into a relationship with a woman named Marie, with whom he shares a home in Hou. He also owns a summer house at Dyngby Strand on the coast south of Odder.
