= Business Park Skejby =

Business park in Aarhus, Denmark

- Interactive map of Business Park Skejby
- Location: Aarhus, Denmark
- Opening date: 2013
- Manager: Arne Vesterdal (board director)
- Owner: cooperatively owned
- No. of tenants: 150
- No. of workers: 20,000
- Parking: yes
- Website: businessparkskejby.dk

Business Park Skejby is a large business park in the city of Aarhus, Denmark.

Business Park Skejby was officially created in 2013 and is situated in the northern district of Aarhus N, stretching north from the neighbourhood of Christiansbjerg to Skejby. It is bounded by the major roads of Ring 2 and Randersvej. Most of the businesses and institutions within the park area were constructed several decades ago.

== Description ==
Apart from small and large individual businesses, Business Park Skejby is also home to the smaller business park Agro Food Park, a large number of educational facilities, and a few residential areas as well. Major institutions, most of which predates 2013, includes:

- The New University Hospital (DNU)
- NRGi headquarters. NRGi is a large Danish coop energy company.
- Vestas Wind Systems, headquarters
- IBM, Danish headquarters
- Olympus
- Danmarks Radio, Jutland department
- VIA University College, Campus Aarhus N
- SOSU aarhus educational centre for social- and healthcareworkers
- INCUBA Science Park, headquarters
- Agro Food Park
- Aarhus Skøjtehal, an indoor ice skating rink
- Aarhus Academy
- Aarhus Tech, main campus

Landmarks for the area includes Aarhus Vandtårn, a former water tower in red brick with a bright green copper roof, the nature site of Vestereng - a former military training ground -, and the old village of Skejby with an old white-washed village church.

Business Park Skejby has its headquarters outside the park in the library and culture centre of Dokk1 at the harbourfront.

== Transportation ==
The business park is located at the outer ring road of Ring 2 (Hasle Ringvej) and the intercity motorway of Randersvej, with easy access to all of Aarhus.

Since December 2017, the business park has been connected to the inner city, including the business park headquarters and the central station, by the Aarhus light rail, an electric tram system.
