= 2021 Odder municipal election =

← 2017	16 November 2021	2025 →

All 19 seats to the Odder Municipal Council 10 seats needed for a majority
- Turnout: 13,678 (74.8%) ▼2.8pp
	First party	Second party	Third party
	V	A	C
Party	Venstre	Social Democrats	Conservatives
Last election	7 seats, 38.5%	5 seats, 25.6%	2 seats, 7.7%
Seats won	7	5	2
Seat change	0	0	0
Popular vote	4,204	3,402	1,825
Percentage	31.1%	25.2%	13.5%
Swing	▼7.4%	▼0.4%	▲5.8%
	Fourth party	Fifth party	Sixth party
	Ø	B	F
Party	Red–Green Alliance	Social Liberals	Green Left
Last election	2 seats, 7.0%	1 seat, 5.8%	1 seat, 5.6%
Seats won	2	2	1
Seat change	0	▲1	0
Popular vote	1,560	1,156	784
Percentage	11.5%	8.6%	5.8%
Swing	▲4.5%	▲2.8%	▲0.2%
	Seventh party
	O
Party	Danish People's Party
Last election	1 seat, 6.0%
Seats won	0
Seat change	▼1
Popular vote	180
Percentage	1.3%
Swing	▼4.7%
Mayor before election
Uffe Jensen
Venstre
Mayor after election
Lone Jakobi
Social Democrats

Uffe Jensen from Venstre was seeking a third term for this election. Despite coming behind the Social Democrats in the 2015 Danish general election and the 2019 Danish general election in votes of Odder municipality, Venstre had become the largest party in the 2017 Odder municipal election.

In this election, Venstre would again become the biggest party, and retain 7 seats despite decreasing their vote share by 7.4%. Danish People's Party would however lose a seat, while the Social Liberals would gain 1. This meant that the parties of the traditional red bloc had a majority, and it was announced that Lone Jakobi from the Social Democrats would become the new mayor.

== Electoral system ==
For elections to Danish municipalities, a number varying from 9 to 31 are chosen to be elected to the municipal council. The seats are then allocated using the D'Hondt method and a closed list proportional representation. Odder Municipality had 19 seats in 2021

Unlike in Danish General Elections, in elections to municipal councils, electoral alliances are allowed.

== Electoral alliances ==
=== Electoral Alliance 1 ===
Party		Political alignment
B	Social Liberals	Centre to Centre-left
F	Green Left	Centre-left to Left-wing
Ø	Red–Green Alliance	Left-wing to Far-Left

=== Electoral Alliance 2 ===
Party		Political alignment
D	New Right	Right-wing to Far-right
O	Danish People's Party	Right-wing to Far-right
V	Venstre	Centre-right

== Results by polling station ==
T = Verdensmål med Vilje

Division	A	B	C	D	F	O	T	V	Ø
Division	%	%	%	%	%	%	%	%	%
Odder	26.8	8.0	13.4	2.5	5.5	1.4	0.2	31.4	10.9
Torrild	16.7	6.3	14.7	2.7	5.7	1.3	0.0	45.7	7.0
Saksild - Nølev	20.9	12.4	12.4	3.0	9.4	1.2	0.3	26.5	13.9
Randlev - Bjerager	24.1	14.0	10.6	2.3	7.3	1.1	0.2	25.4	14.9
Hou, Gosmer - Halling	26.2	6.9	11.7	2.3	5.3	1.3	0.0	33.4	13.1
Gylling	18.2	13.5	24.8	4.7	4.7	1.5	0.7	22.6	9.3
Ørting-Falling	28.7	5.4	15.5	4.0	5.6	1.1	0.4	29.1	10.2
Hundslund	21.9	6.9	10.5	2.8	4.0	1.5	2.6	37.0	12.8
Alrø	17.1	6.0	23.9	1.7	4.3	0.9	0.0	37.6	8.5
Tunø	11.5	0.0	1.6	1.6	4.9	1.6	1.6	59.0	18.0

== Results ==
Party		Votes	%	+/-	Seats	+/-
Odder Municipality
V	Venstre	4,204	31.09	-7.43	7	0
A	Social Democrats	3,402	25.16	-0.39	5	0
C	Conservatives	1,825	13.50	+5.75	2	0
Ø	Red-Green Alliance	1,560	11.54	+4.55	2	0
B	Social Liberals	1,156	8.55	+2.78	2	+1
F	Green Left	784	5.80	+0.19	1	0
D	New Right	364	2.69	New	0	New
O	Danish People's Party	180	1.33	-4.71	0	-1
T	Verdensmål med Vilje	47	0.35	New	0	New
Total		13,522	100	N/A	19	N/A
Invalid votes		29	0.16	+0.01		
Blank votes		127	0.69	+0.01		
Turnout		13,678	74.79	-2.80		
Source: valg.dk
