= Agro Food Park =

Agro Food Park is a business organisation and an agriculture and foodstuff business park in Aarhus, Denmark. Agro Food Park was inaugurated on 9 September 2009 and is located within the larger business park of Business Park Skejby in Skejby, a northern neighbourhood in the city of Aarhus.

Agro Food Park is an international centre for innovation and distribution of knowledge within the agriculture and food sector as well as the associated technology sector. The business organisation of Agro Food Park focus on agriculture and foodstuff businesses in Denmark and cooperates with external businesses, universities and governmental authorities to facilitate interdisciplinary knowledge sharing and innovative solutions. One of the main purposes is to make sure that Danish agriculture and foodstuff companies in the region of East Jutland and countrywide are able to compete on an international level. Main issues are technology and knowledge sharing, consultance and innovation based on values of sustainability, cultural and societal values as well as profitable and healthy food production for businesses regardless of size.

As of 2016, Agro Food Park has 925 employees divided across 50 companies with a total of 33,000 m2 of office space, a laboratory and conference facilities. The park also administers 5 hectares of testing fields and 100 hectares of growing fields. The companies in Agro Food Park ranges from the smallest of companies to some of the largest agriculture and foodstuff businesses and organisations in Denmark such as Arla Foods and SEGES.

== Sources ==
- "Agro Food Park" (in Danish). Archived from the original on 2016-03-28.
