= Niels-Ulrik Bugge =

Danish politician

Mayor of Odder Municipality
- In office 1 January 2006 – 31 December 2009
- Preceded by: Elvin J. Hansen (A)
- Succeeded by: Elvin J. Hansen (A)

Personal details
- Born: 29 June 1943 (age 83) Vejle, Denmark
- Party: Venstre

Niels-Ulrik Bugge (born 29 July 1943) is a Danish politician. He is a member of the Venstre party. From 2006 to 2010 he was the mayor of Odder Municipality. He has a background as a lawyer.
