= Skejby =

- Neighborhood
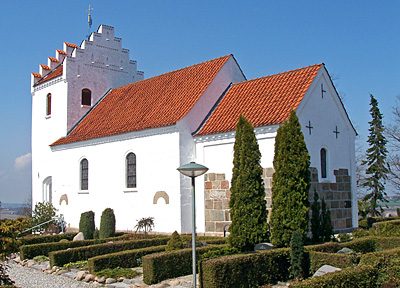
- The old Skejby Church

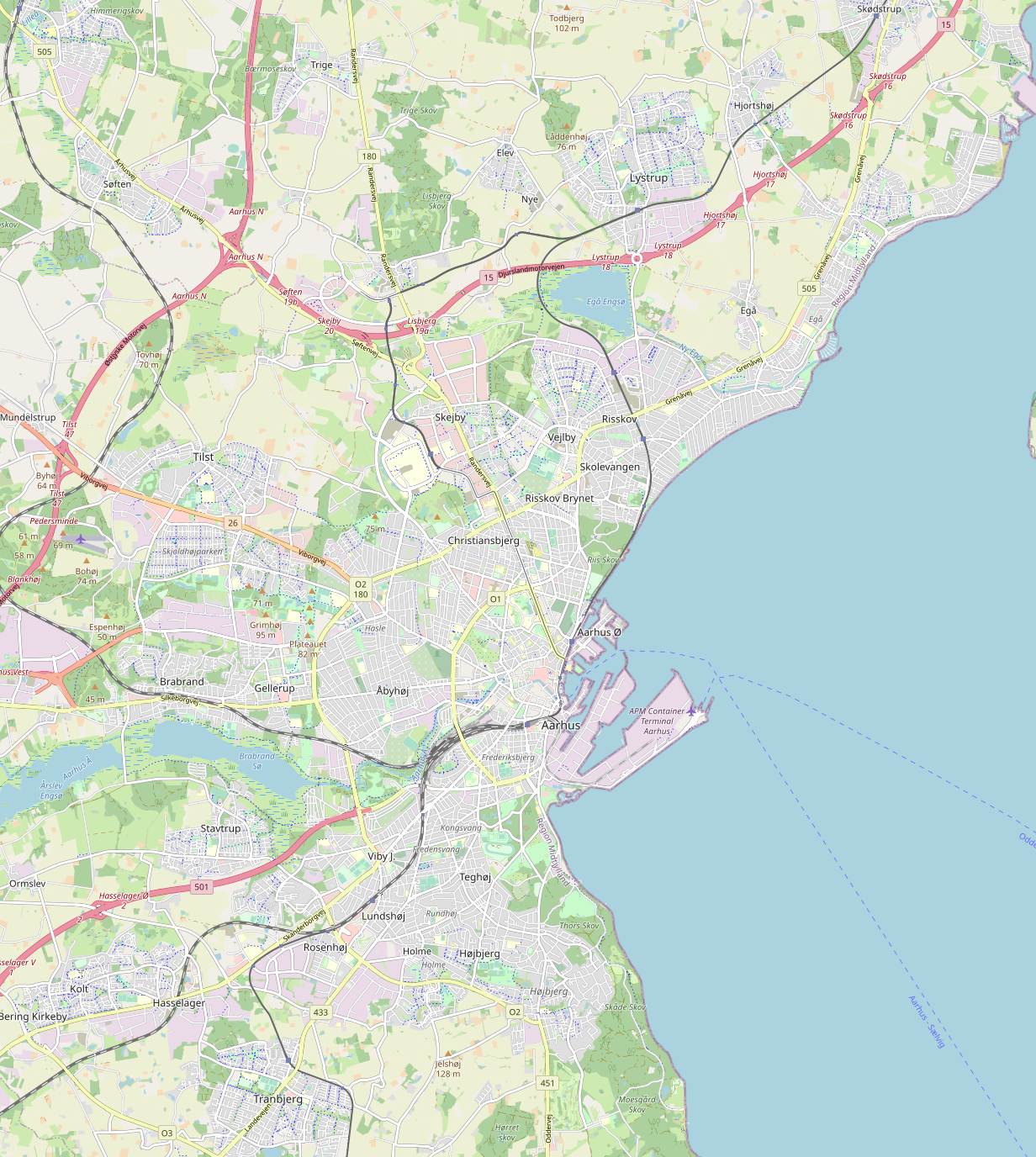
- Location within Aarhus
- Coordinates: 56.190680°N 10.178177°E
- Country: Kingdom of Denmark
- Regions of Denmark: Central Denmark Region
- Municipality: Aarhus Municipality
- District: Aarhus N
- Postal code: 8200

Skejby is a neighbourhood and former village in Aarhus, Denmark. The neighbourhood is part of the city district Aarhus N.

The Skejby village was originally situated in the countryside north of Aarhus, overlooking the broad flat Egå Valley, but urban development has engulfed it, creating a new suburban neighbourhood by the same name. The old village is still distinctly visible, surrounding the old white village church. Archaeological excavations have revealed, that Skejby has been settled since the early Iron Ages (c. 500 BC), but finds from the Stone Age has also been unearthed. Søften and Lisbjerg north of Skejby, are important archaeological sites.

== The neighbourhood ==
The Skejby neighbourhood comprise a large business park, an industrial park, a regional hospital, and several major institutions for education and business. Residential areas forms a large part of Skejby east of the expressway of Randersvej, while the old village is the only residential area west of the expressway, with the exception of a few new apartment blocks near nature site Vestereng.

Business Park Skejby stretches south from the old village of Skejby towards Aarhus and continues into the neighbourhood of Christiansbjerg. In Skejby, it contains the Agro Food Park, with a focus on agriculture and foodstuff, and offices and business headquarters for companies such as Vestas, Rambøll, IBM, TDC Hosting, and NRGi. The headquarters of INCUBA Science Park, the educational institution of Professionshøjskolen VIA University College is also located here.

The New University Hospital (DNU) was built in Skejby in the years 2012-2018 and is absorbing all other hospital departments across Aarhus, to be fully functional in 2020. The new hospital complex includes a psychiatric department and the only emergency and trauma center in Aarhus.

East of the expressway of Randersvej, in a low-rise residential area, is the mall of Skejby Centret and the headquarters of the television company department TV 2/Østjylland. North of here is a lightweight industrial park stretching eastward into the neighbourhood of Vejlby. The industrial park comprise large store departments of ILVA, IKEA and Silvan Byggemarked, and a number of mixed industries, offices and warehouse facilities. The woodland of Mollerup Skov in the east, connects with the nature site of Egå Engsø.

== Aarhus light rail ==
The first leg of Aarhus light rail was inaugurated in December 2017 and connects the inner city to Skejby, continuing north to Lisbjerg. There is a station at the new AU Hospital.

== Gallery ==
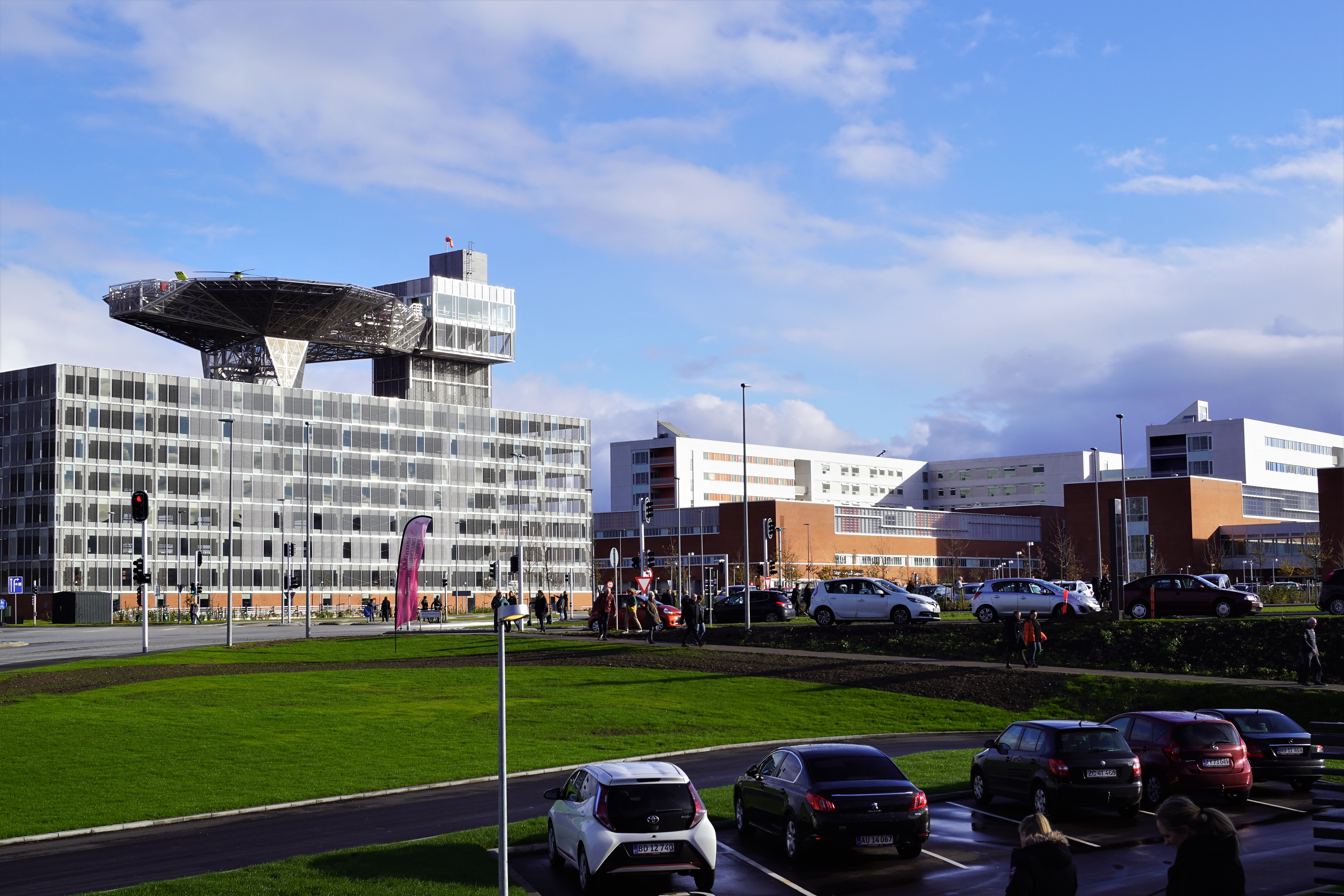
Aarhus University Hospital (DNU)

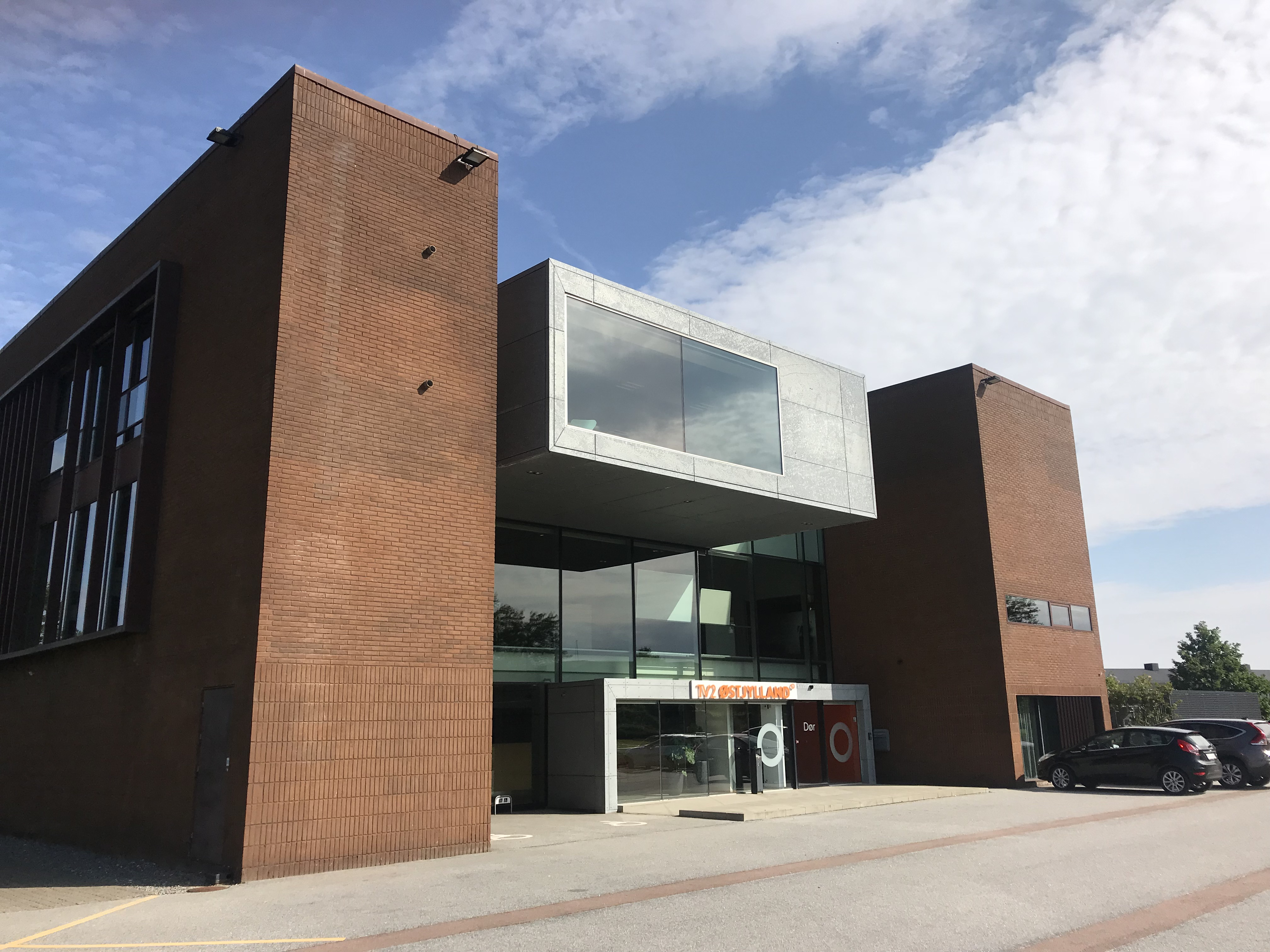
TV2 Østjylland headquarters

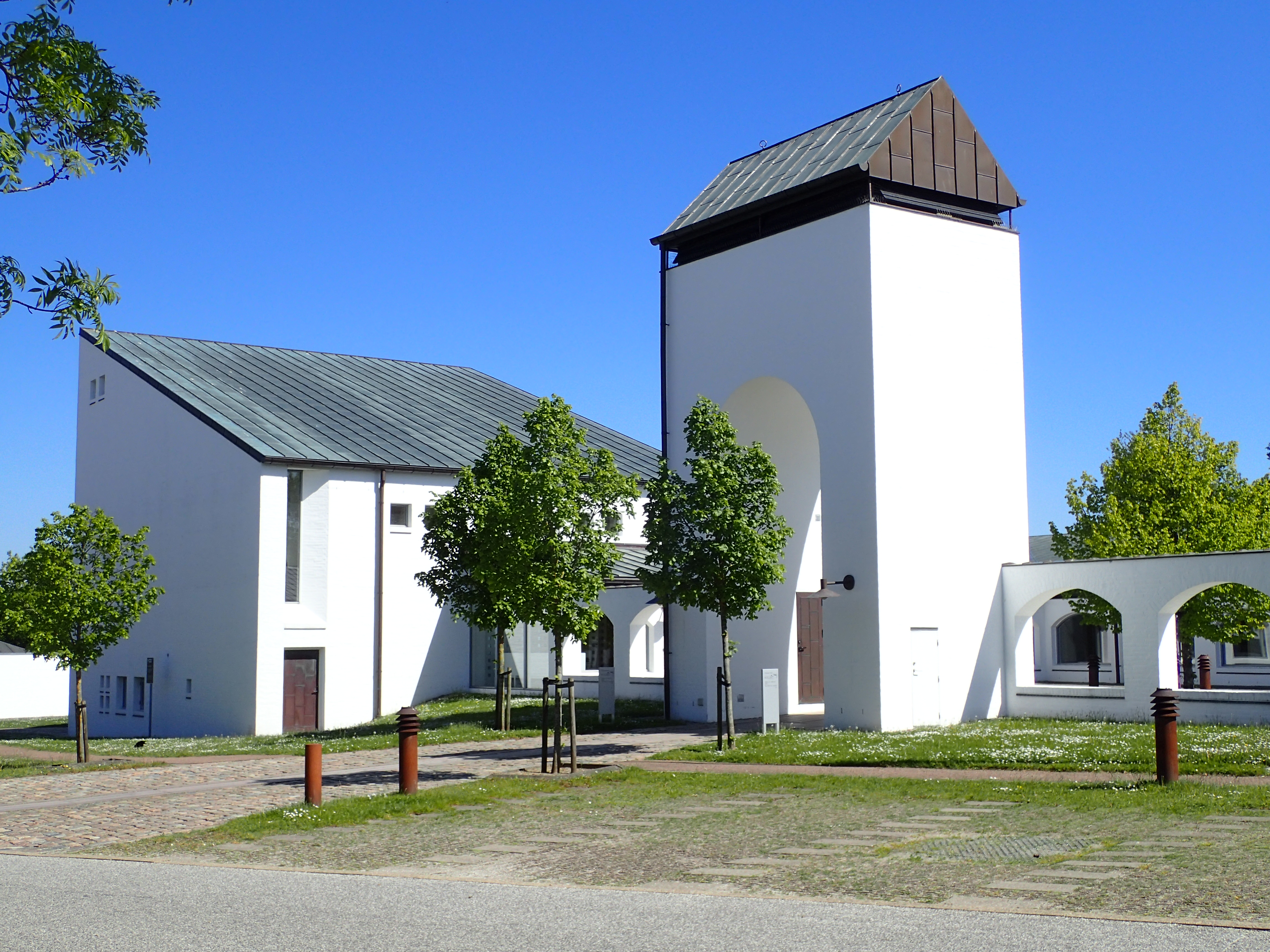
The modern-style Skelager church

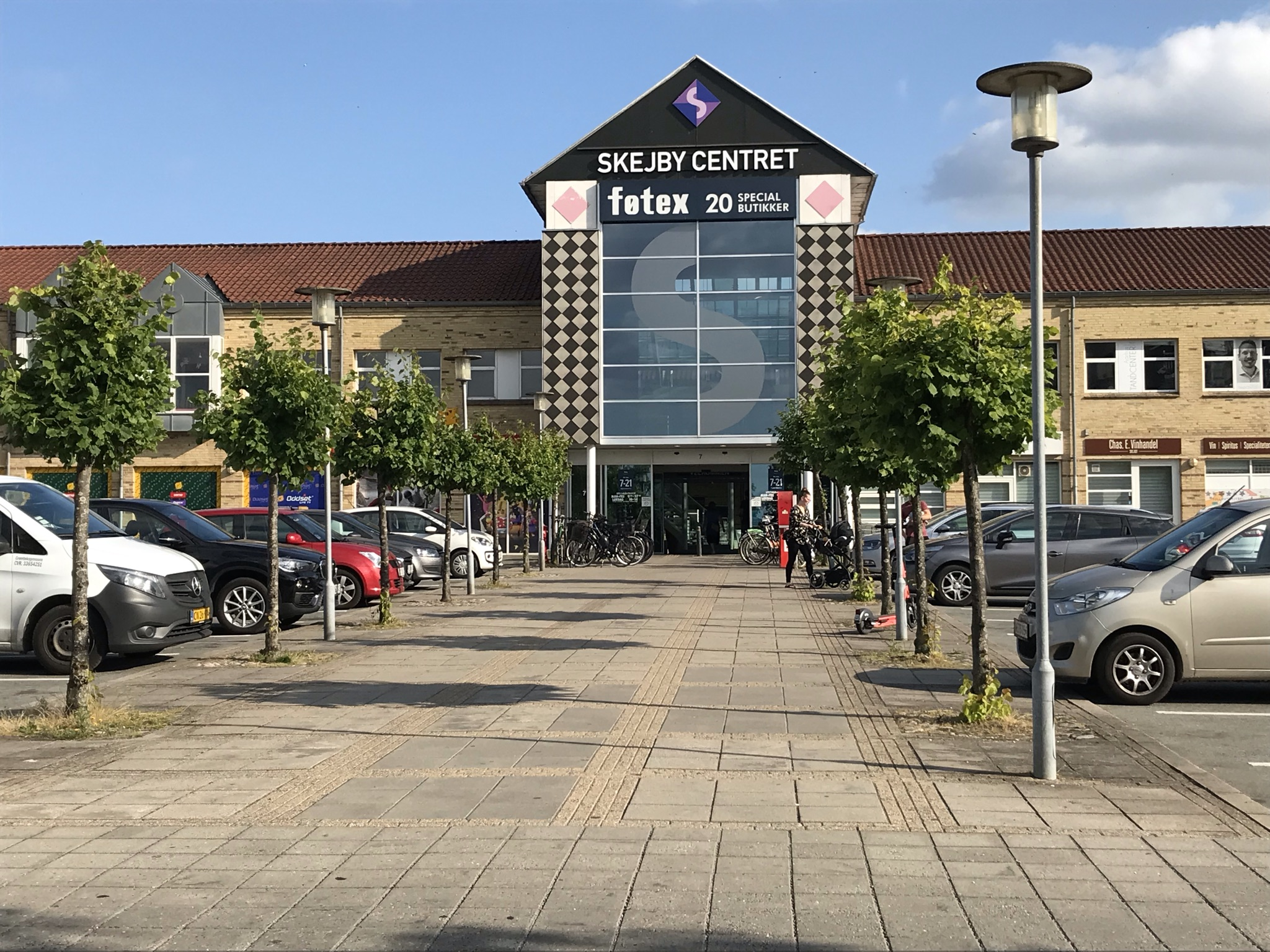
Skejby Centret

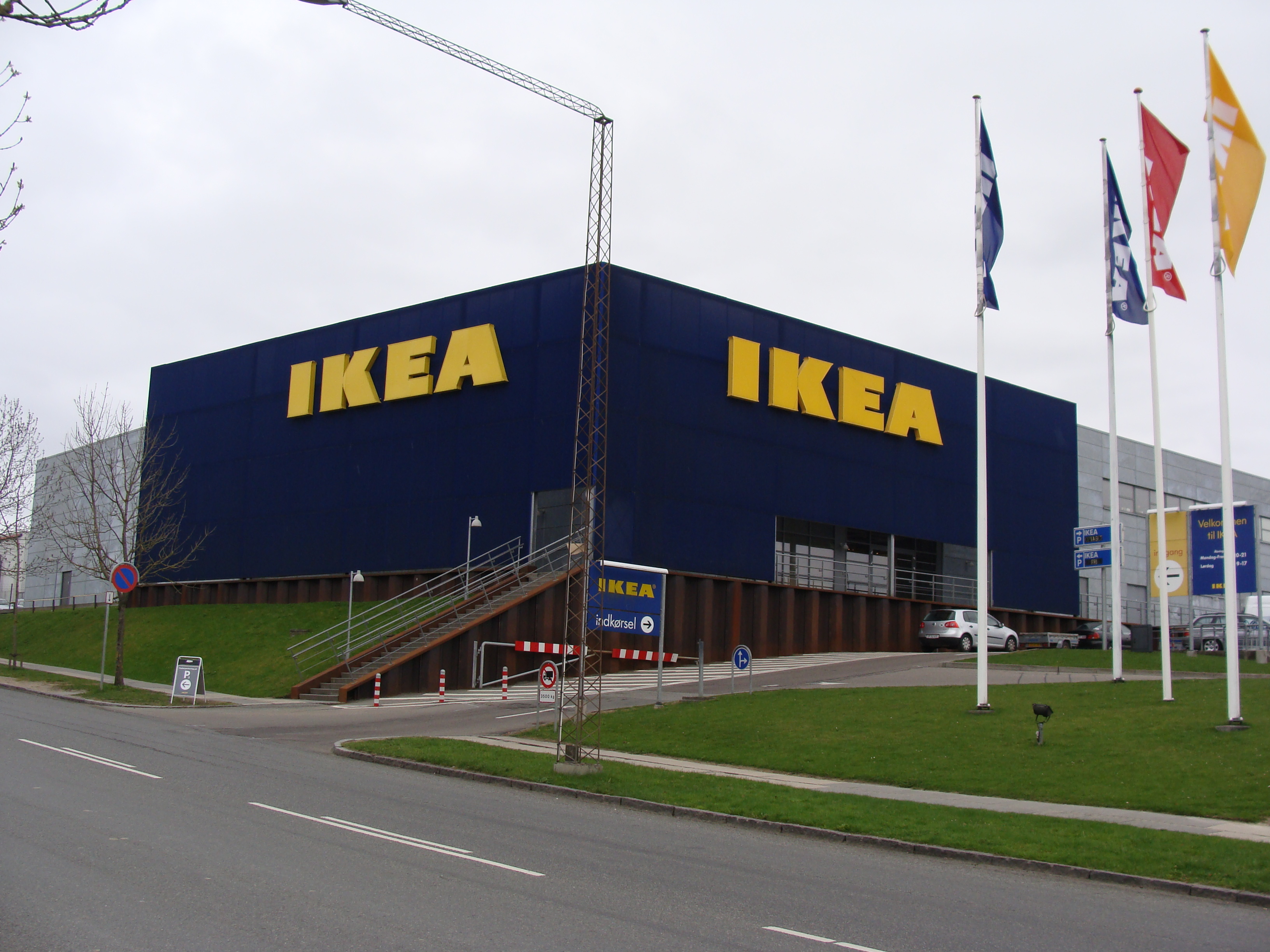
IKEA

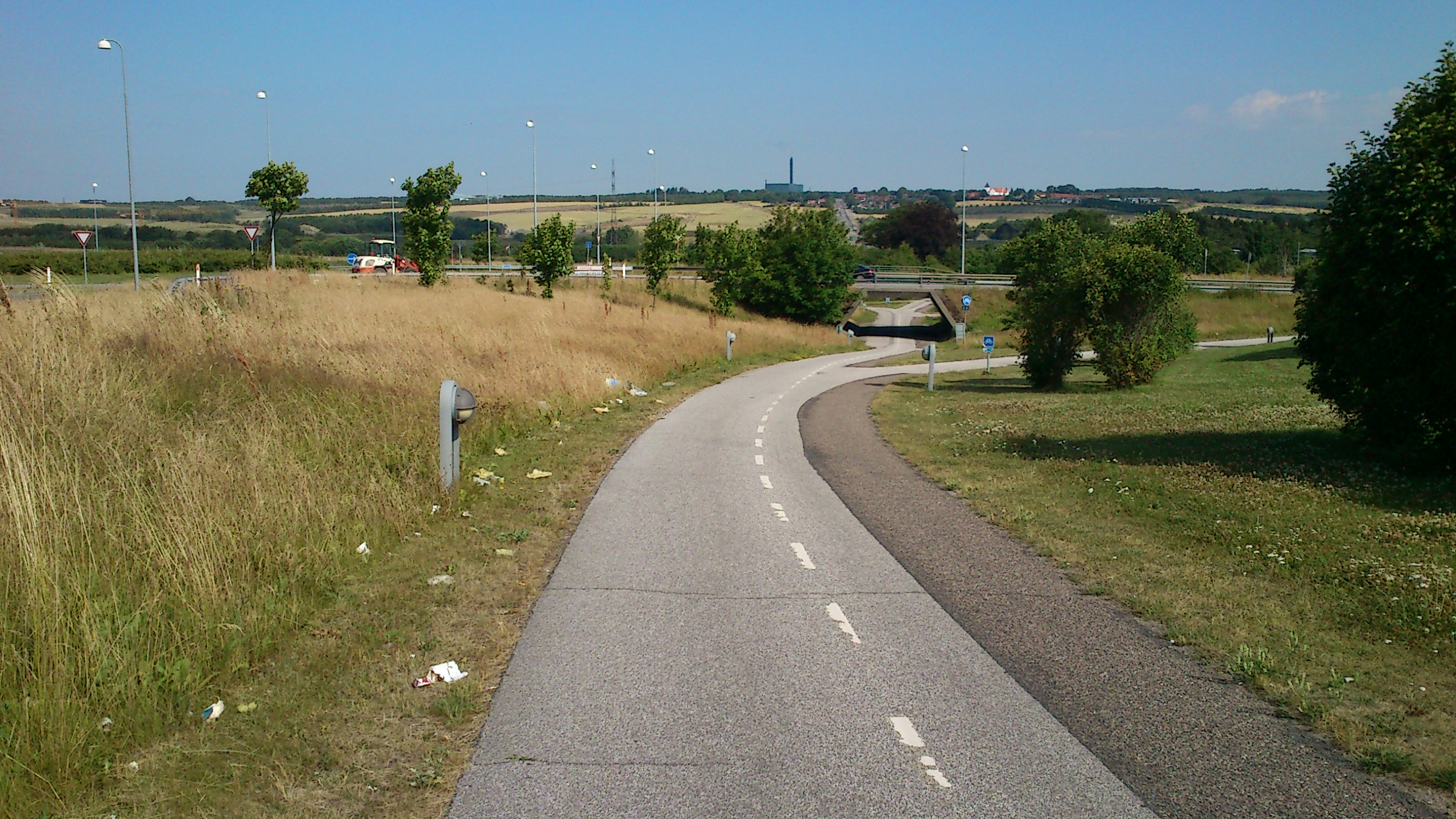
The Egå Valley

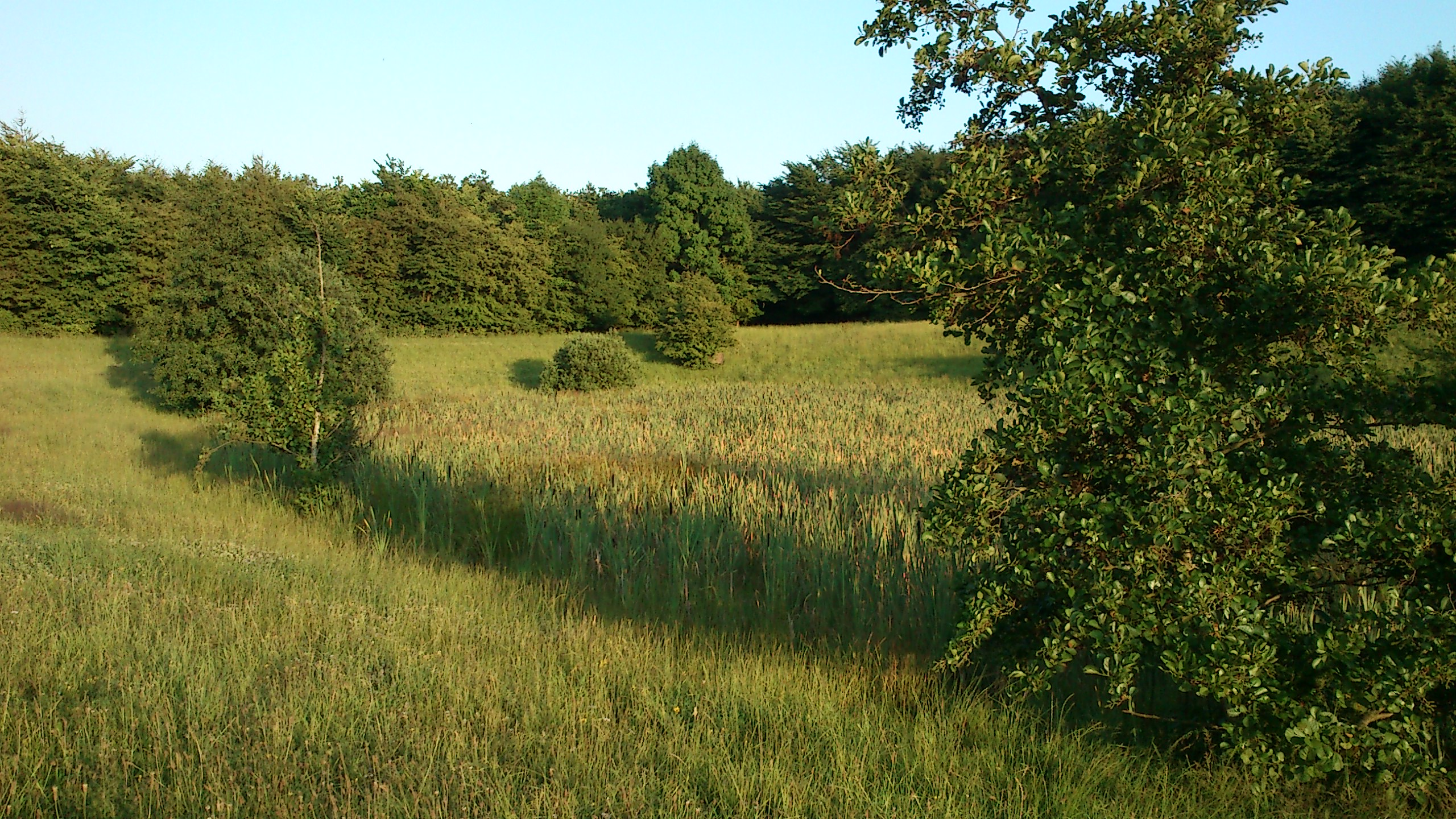
From Mollerup Skov.
