= Vestereng =

Nature site in Denmark

Coordinates: 56°11′12″N 10°10′47″E

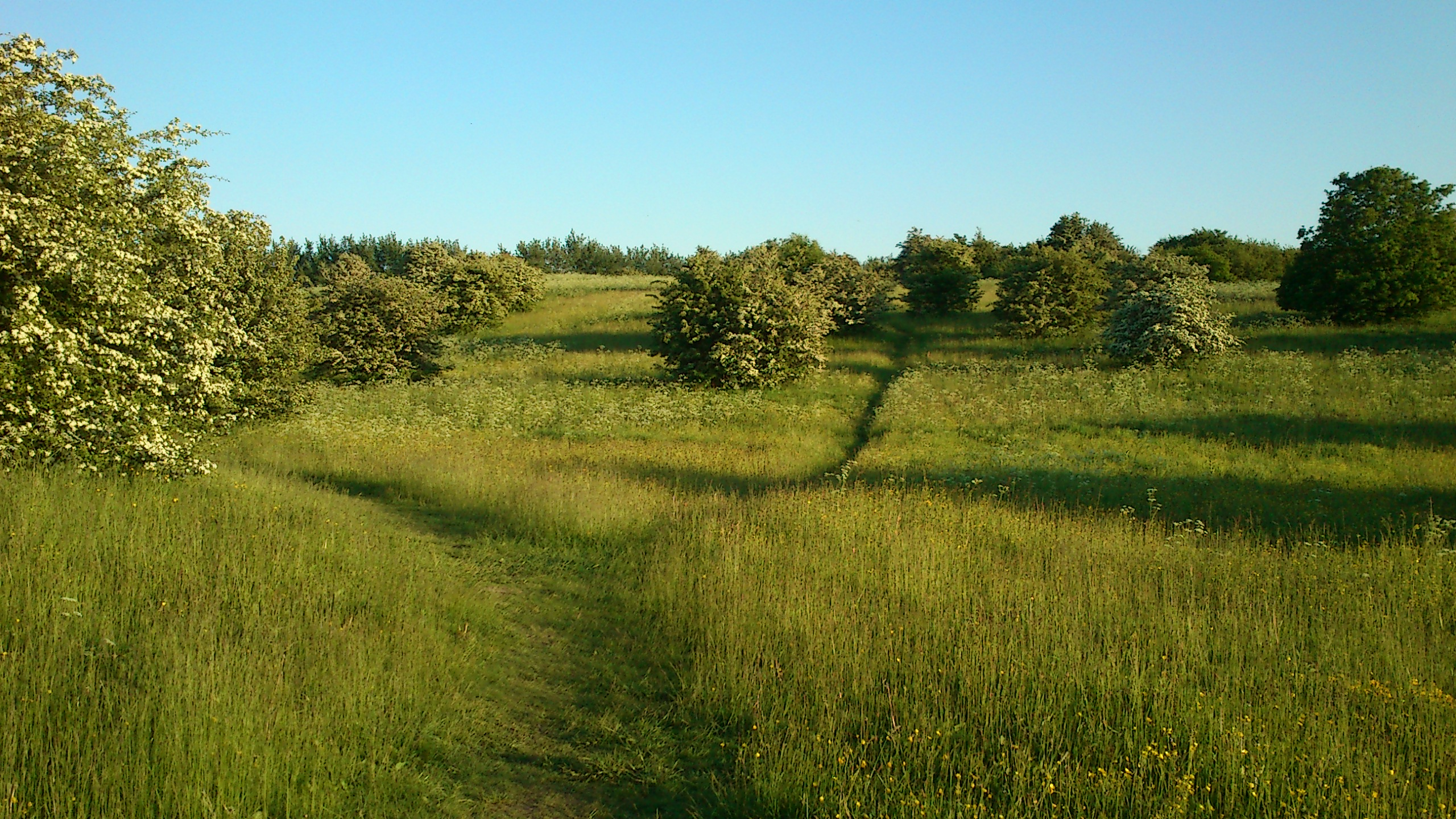
From the meadows at Vestereng. Hawthorn is the most common tree here.

Vestereng is a nature site in the environs of northern Aarhus and the suburb of Skejby. The name literally translates as 'westward meadow'. The Municipality of Aarhus took ownership in 1939.

The area has a lively history of recent times and is now used extensively by several civil groups and organizations. The most prevalent groups as of 2013, being Aarhus Beach Volley Club, the roleplaying club Einherjerne, Aarhus Dirt Jump Park and Aarhus civil dog handling Association.

== History ==
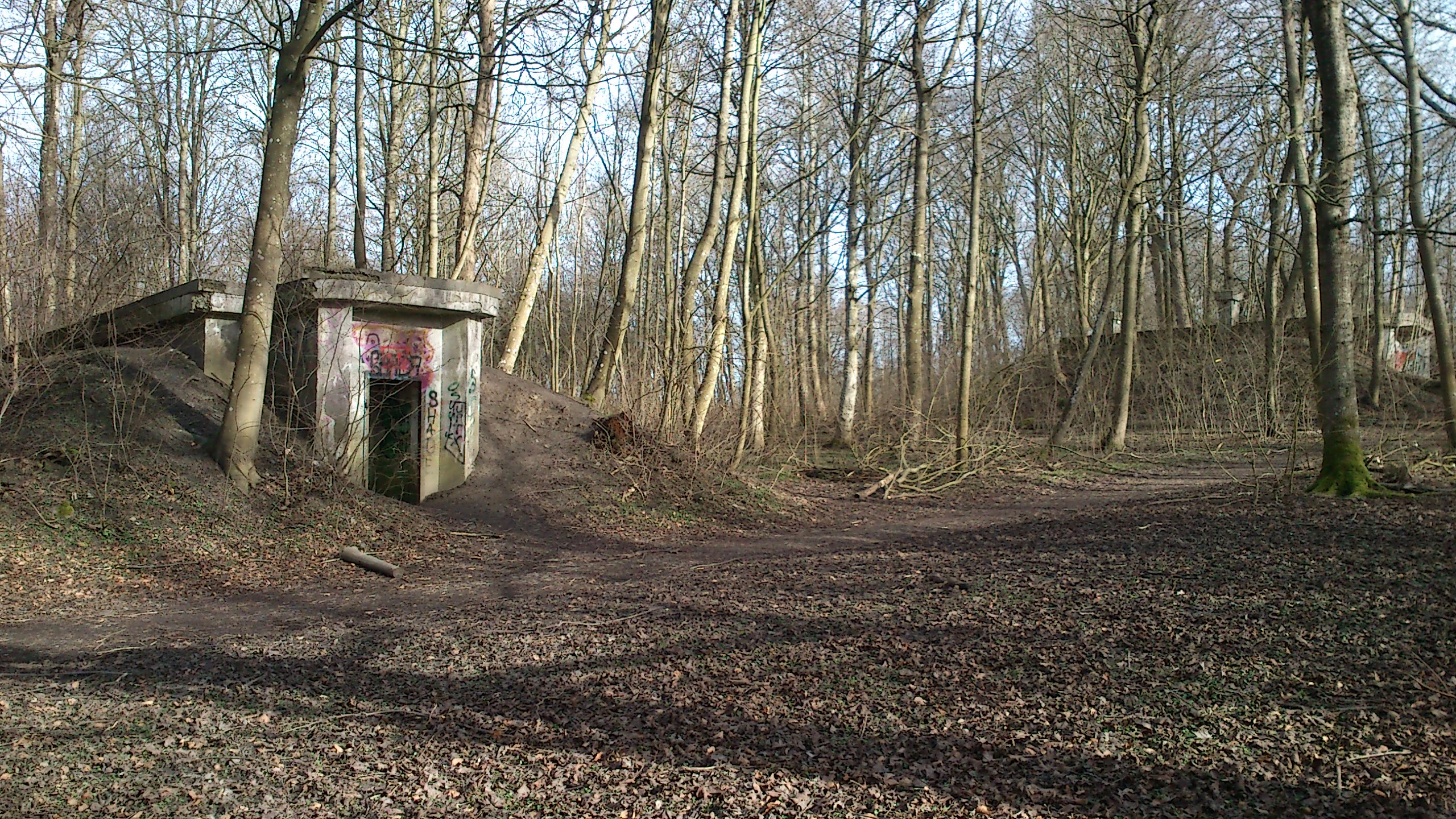
Two of the many WW II bunkers in the woodlands on Vestereng.

Vestereng was used by the German occupational forces as ammunition storage for the Kriegsmarine during the Second World War. They constructed a total of 14 concrete bunkers; 10 as storage facilities and 4 for machinegun defence and the bunkers are still here today, as a historical testimony to the occupation. After the liberation in 1945, the Danish military forces took over and Vestereng was used as a shooting range and training ground for several decades. From 1978-87 the Danish Home Guard took over the military practice on Vestereng.

=== Music ===
Up until 2013, Vestereng was used as a venue for large outdoor concerts, but this activity has been discontinued due to the newly expanded Aarhus University Hospital in Skejby close by and inaccessibility to emergency and firefighting units.

The Aarhus leg of the annual Danish Muscular Dystrophy Association benefit concert tour, Grøn Koncert (Green Concert), was held in Vestereng since 1987 along with other large popular music concerts. Over the years, Vestereng has hosted big outdoor concerts with many popular Danish and several internationally acclaimed bands such as Medina, Kashmir, Nephew, Magtens Korridorer and Simple Minds, The Police, D-A-D, Metallica, etc. to name a few.

== Nature ==
The nature of Vestereng comprise meadows, scattered vegetation and a woodland area. There are a number of smaller ponds here and a stream is running through the area to join the larger Egå, a few kilometres north of here. The meadows are very popular with moles apparently, as evidenced by the many molehills. Hawthorns is the most common tree at Vestereng and they also forms a peculiar habitat of hawthorn-forest.

Despite the relatively high level of activity, Vestereng supports a rich flora and fauna, with some species rare or almost rare to Denmark even. These are primarily insects and organisms depending on a wet environment. Roe deer can sometimes be seen here, as they roam the area of Vestereng and Brendstrup Skov further east. They are to be protected.

== Gallery ==
Hawthorn

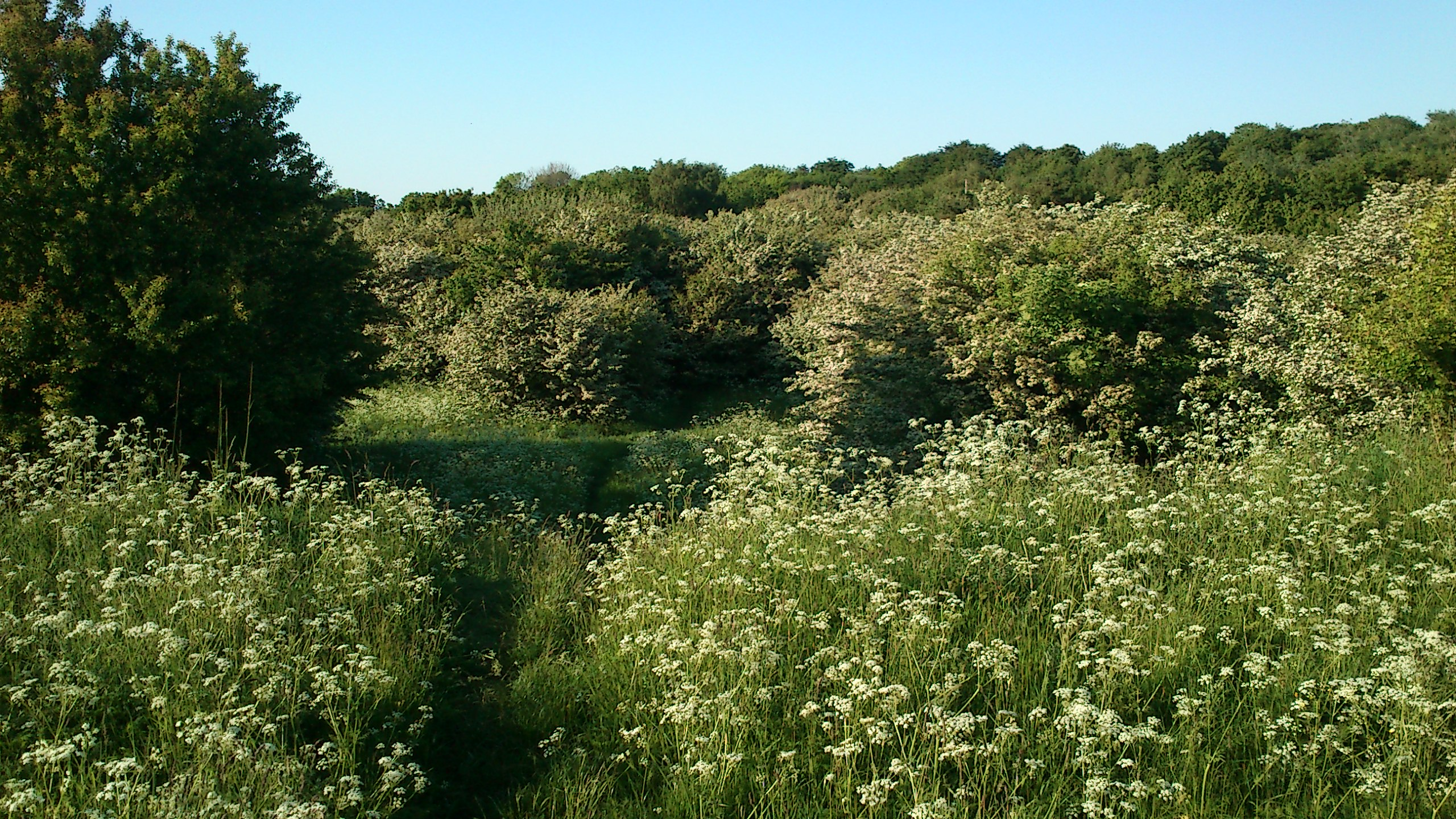
View across Vestereng and the Hawthorn-forest in May.

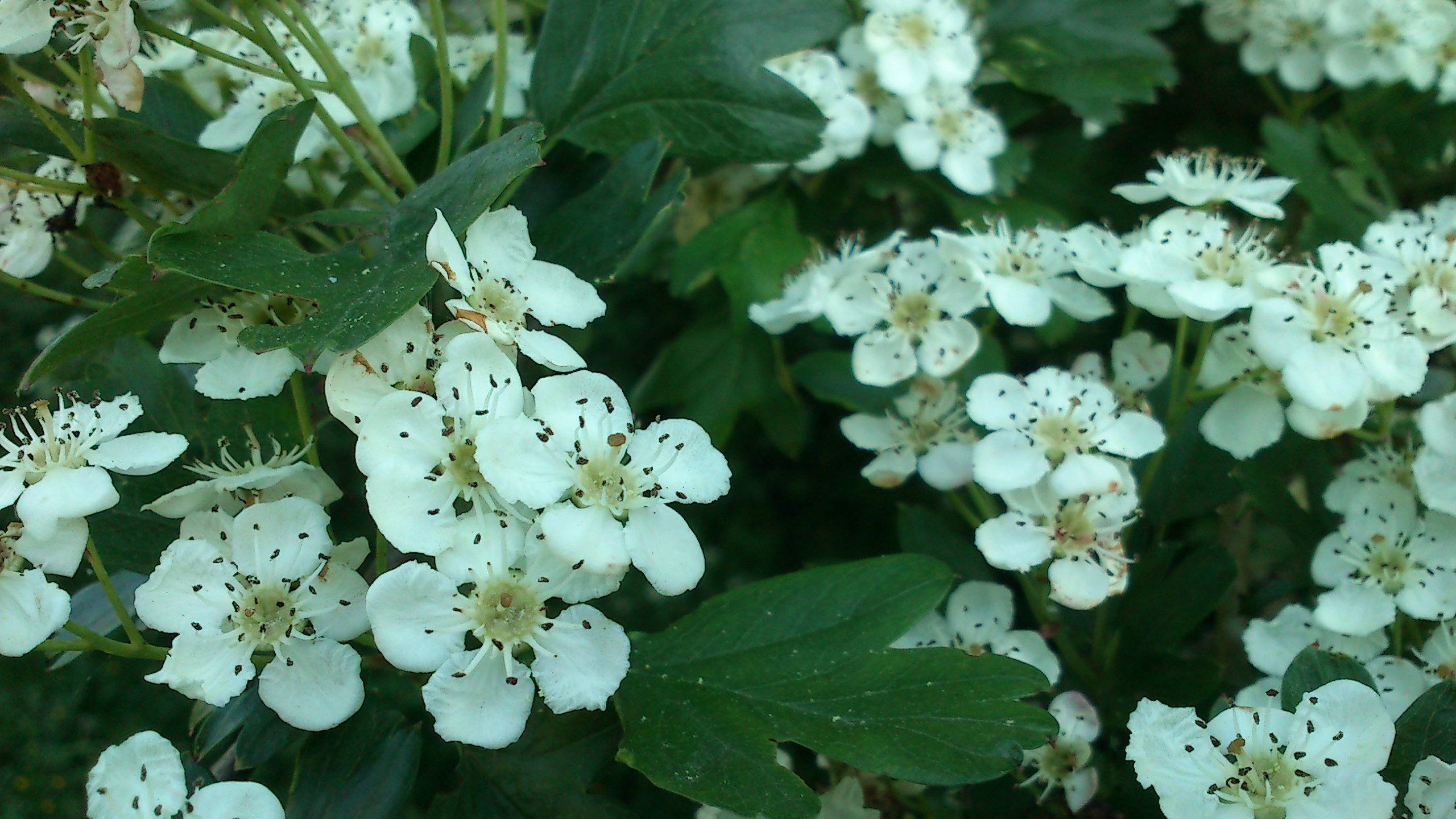
Single-seeded hawthorn (crataegus monogyna)

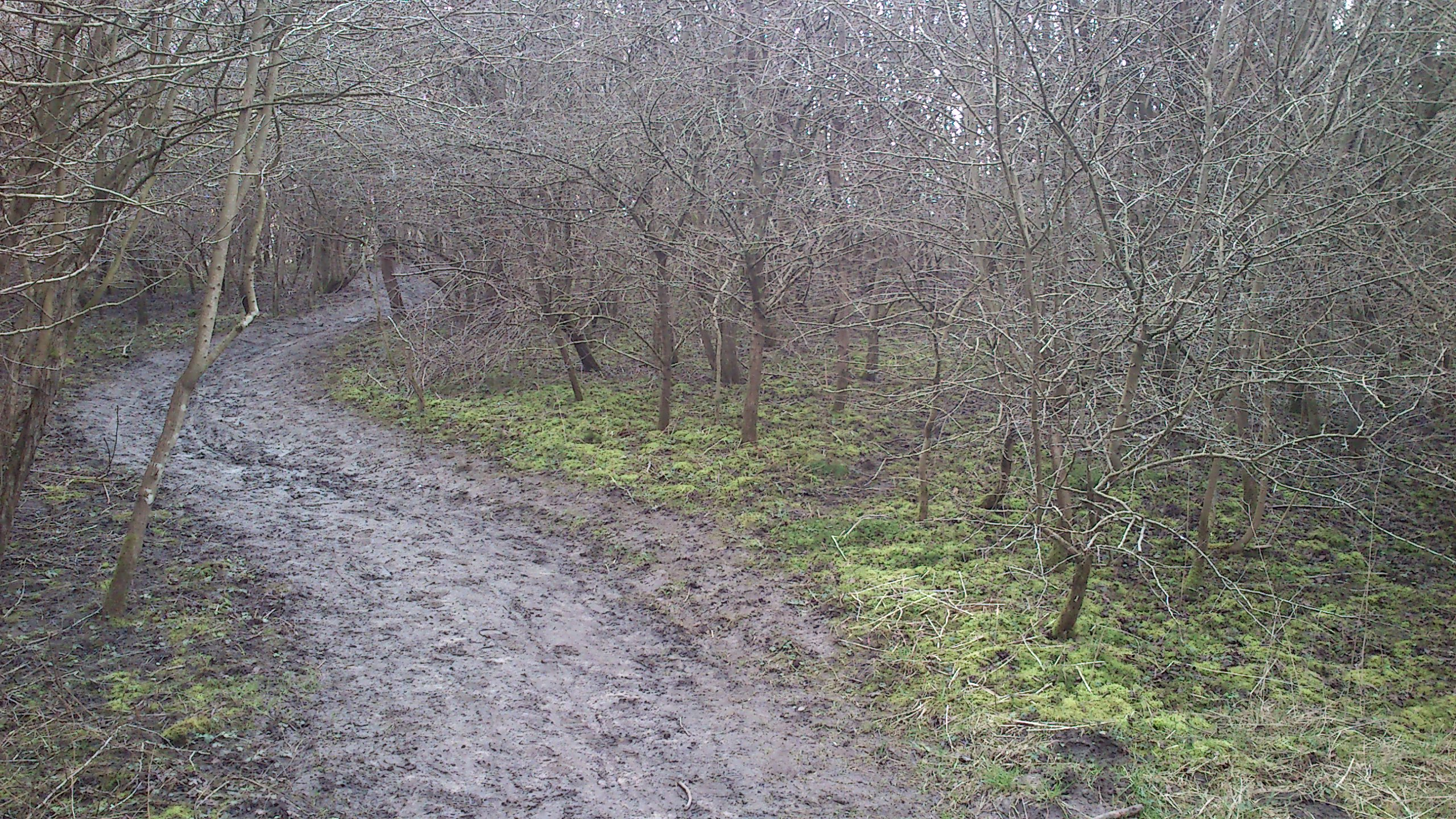
Inside the Hawthorn-forest (March)

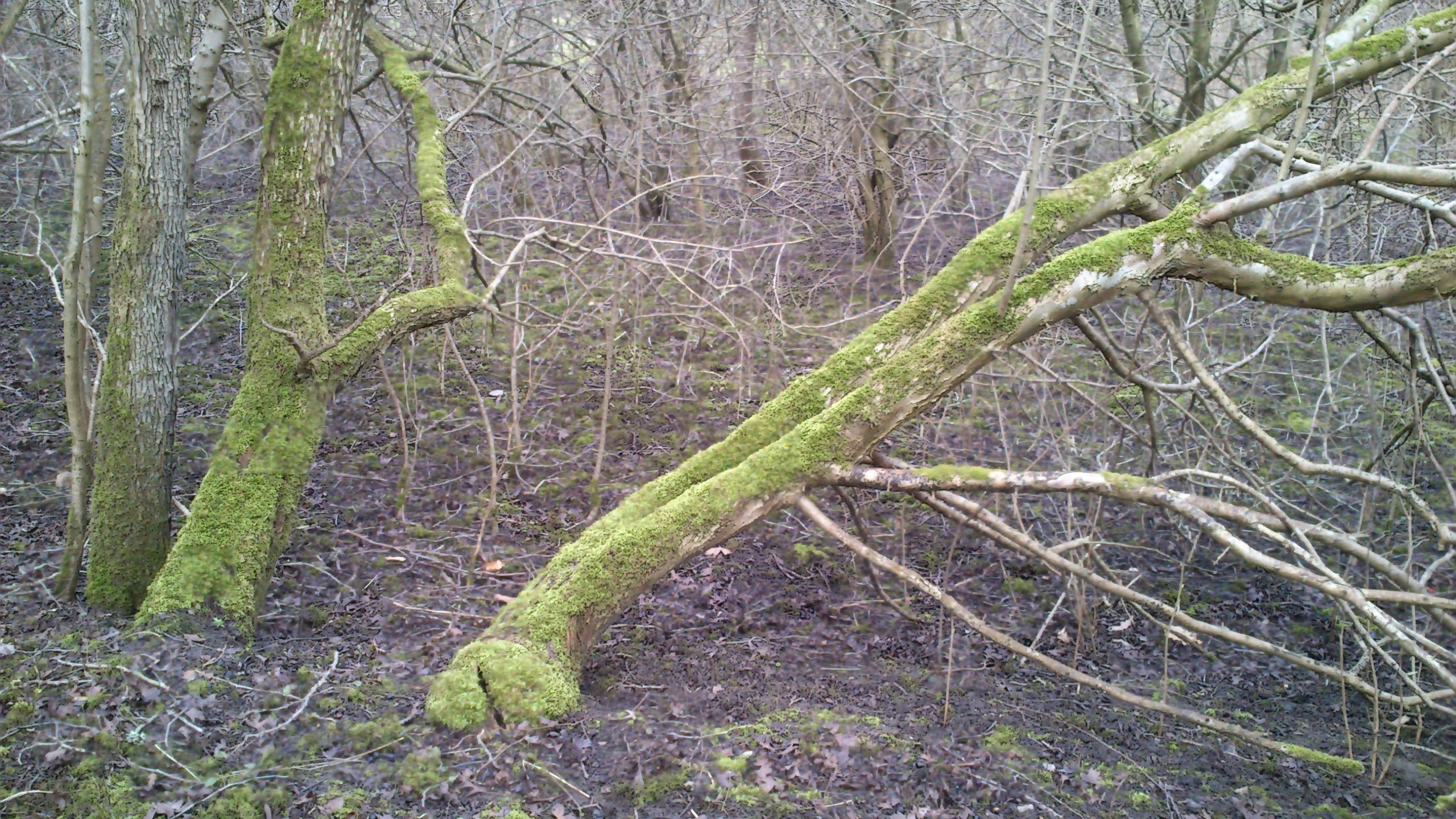
Hawthorn trees (March)

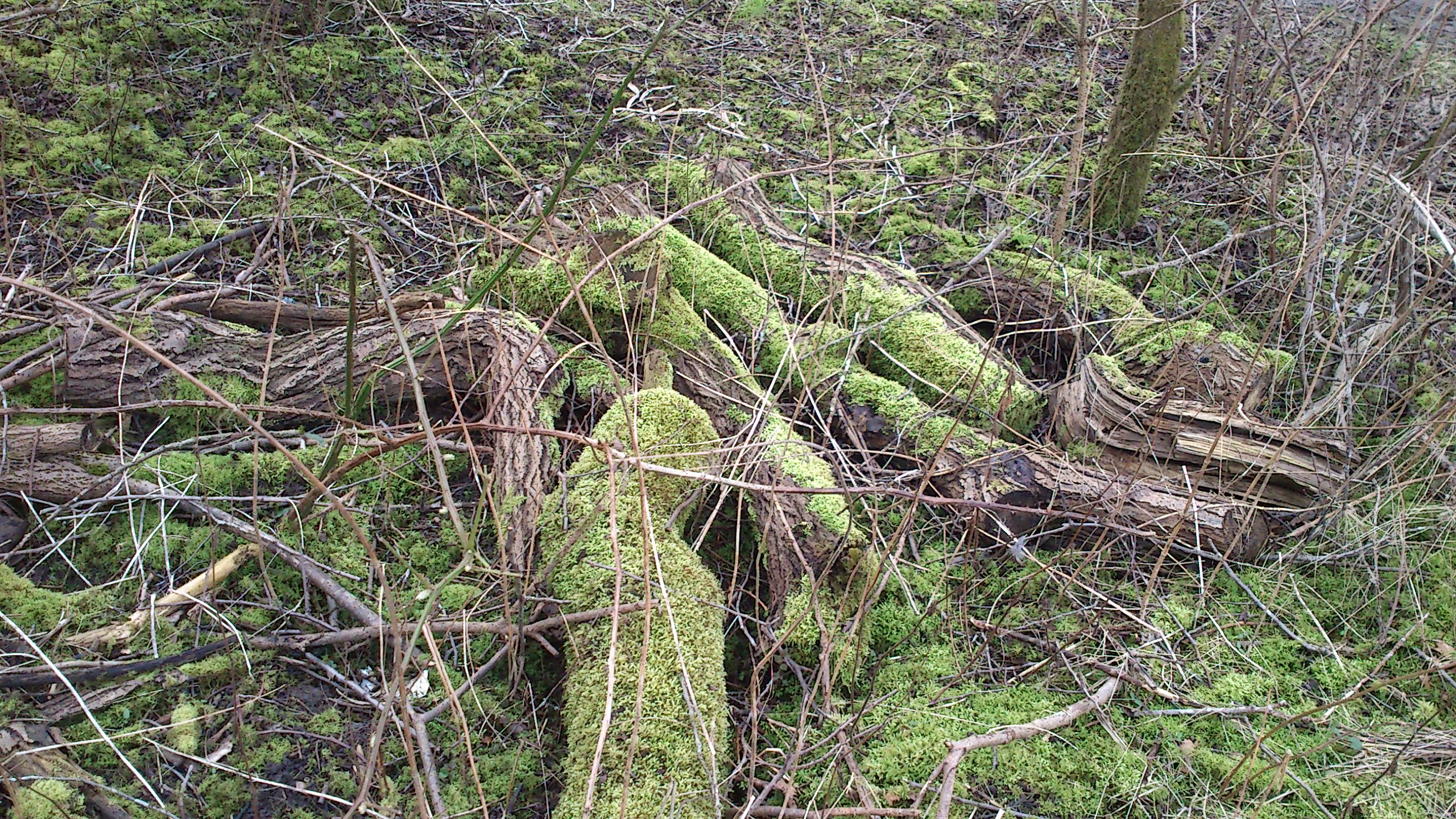
Forest floor in the Hawthorn-forest. Hawthorn outcompetes other plant-life.

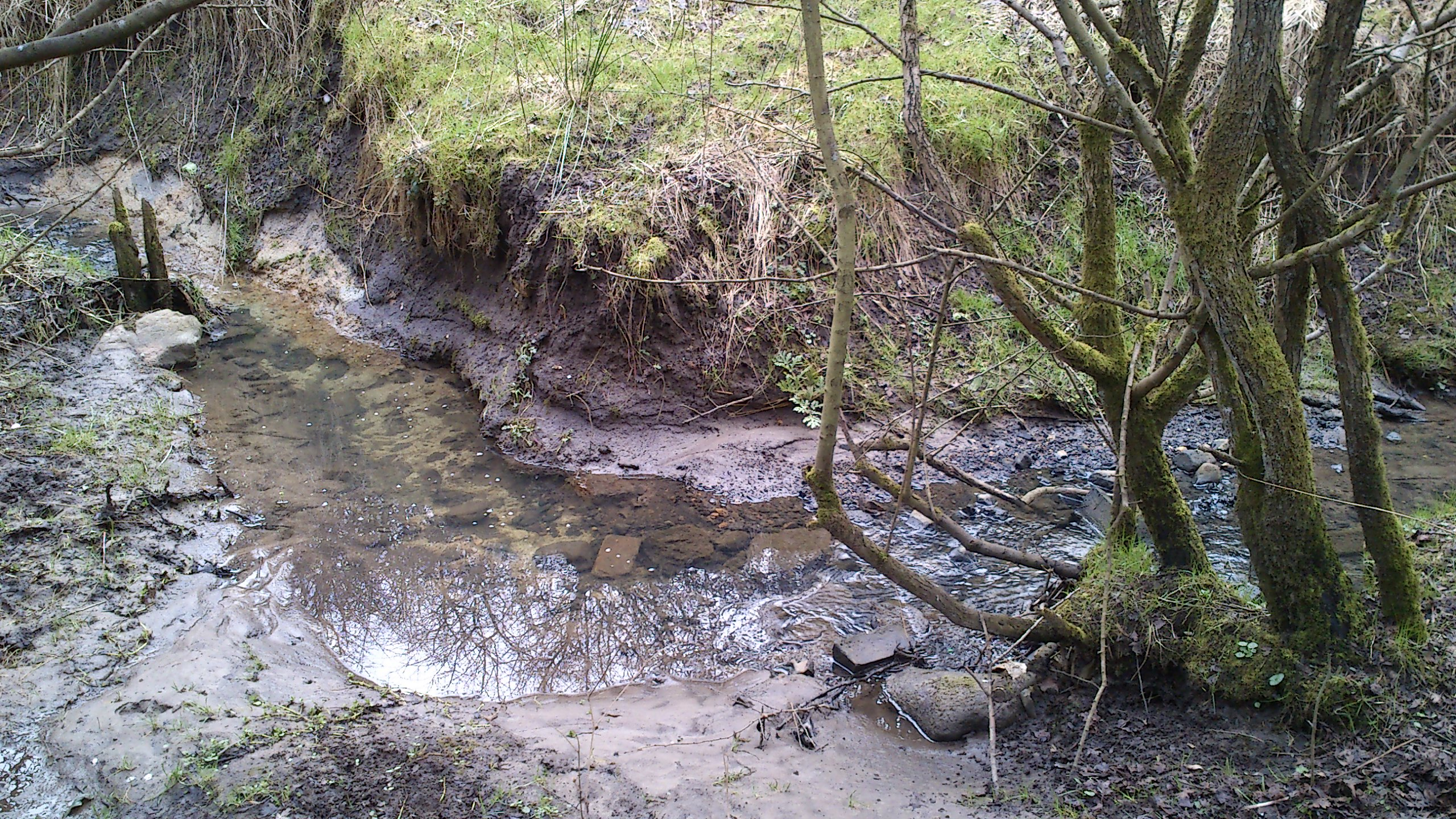
The stream of Vestereng Bæk (March)

Nature and landscape

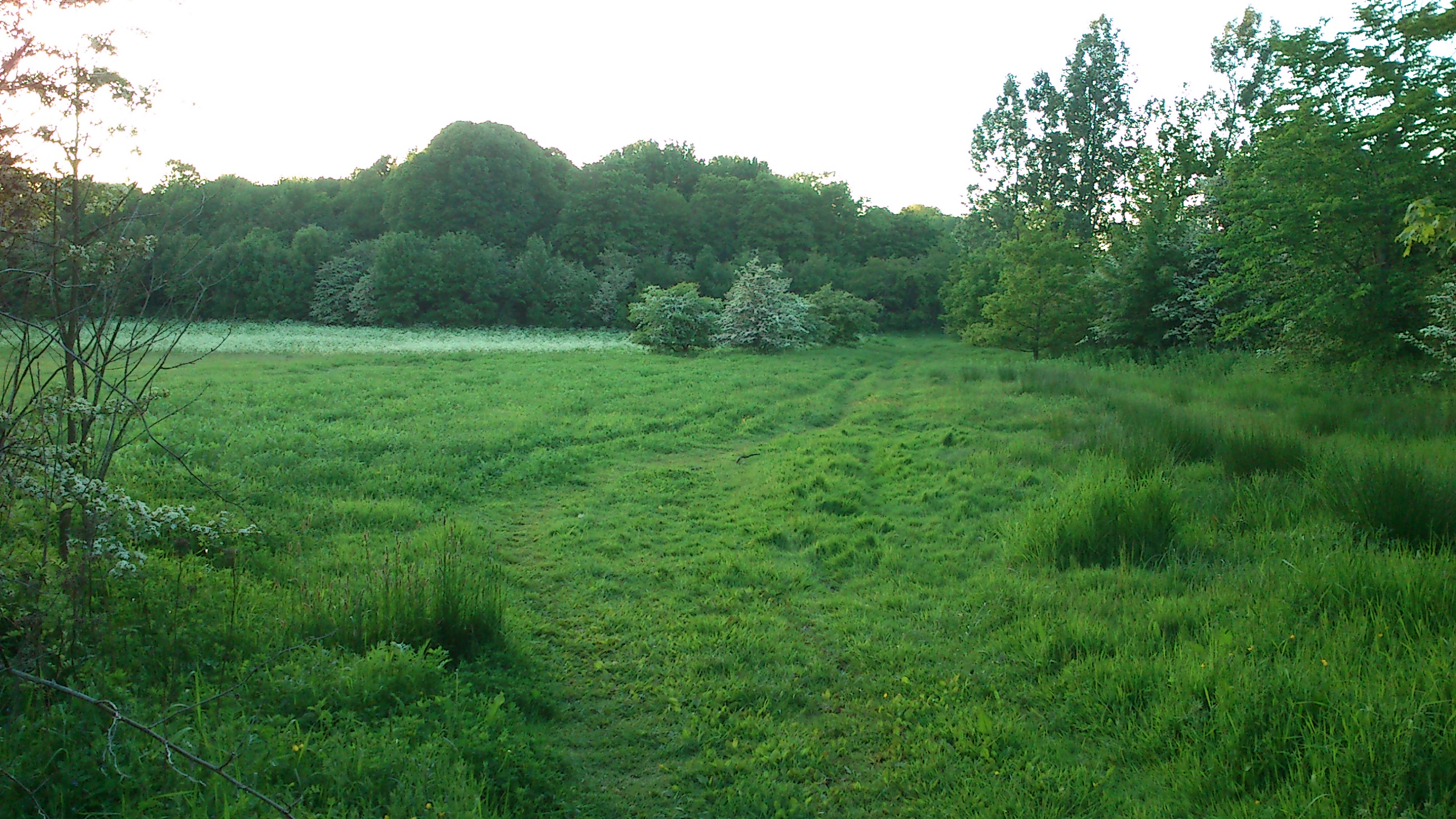
View across the meadows in May

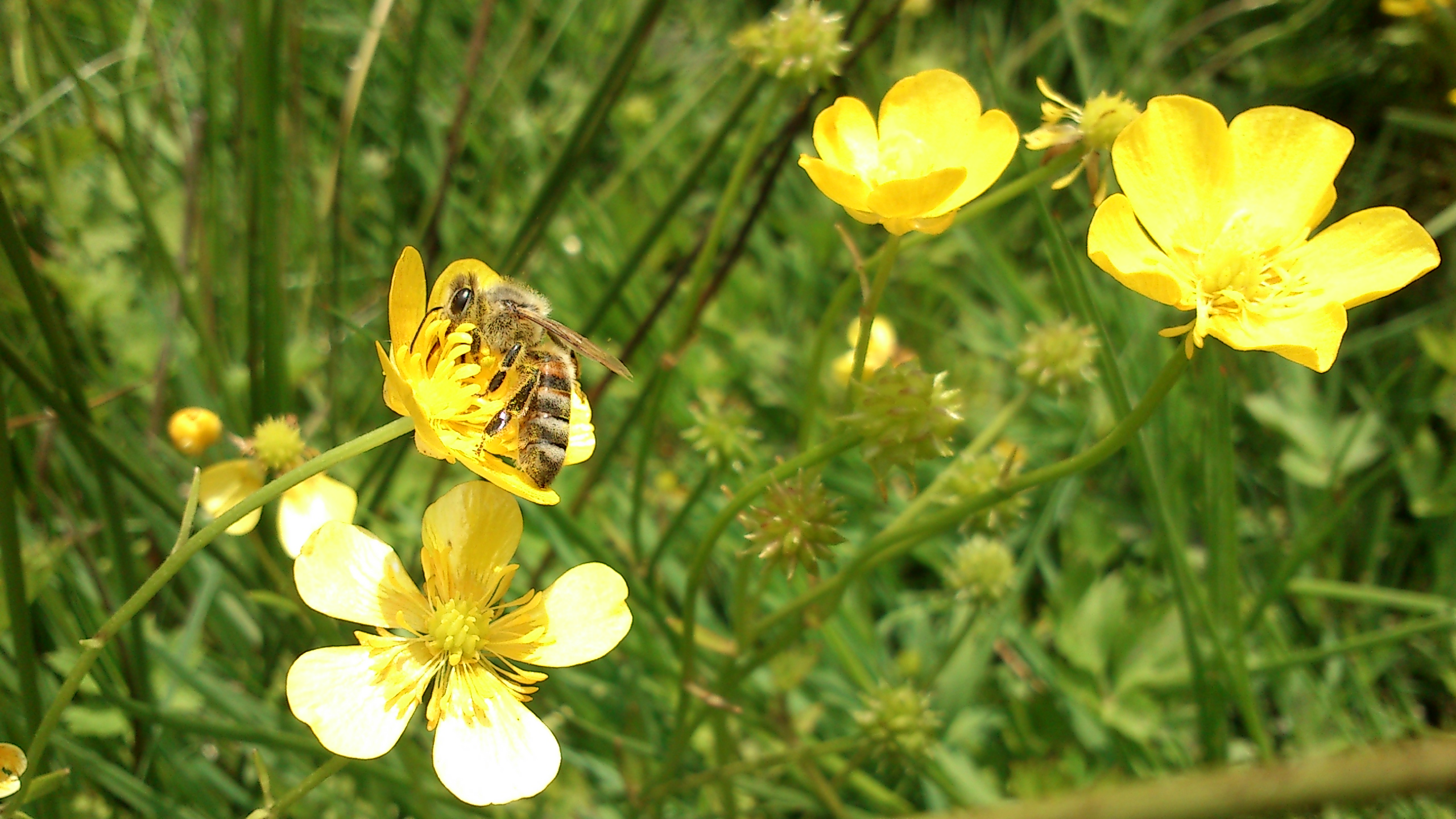
Flowers and insects in the meadows (June)

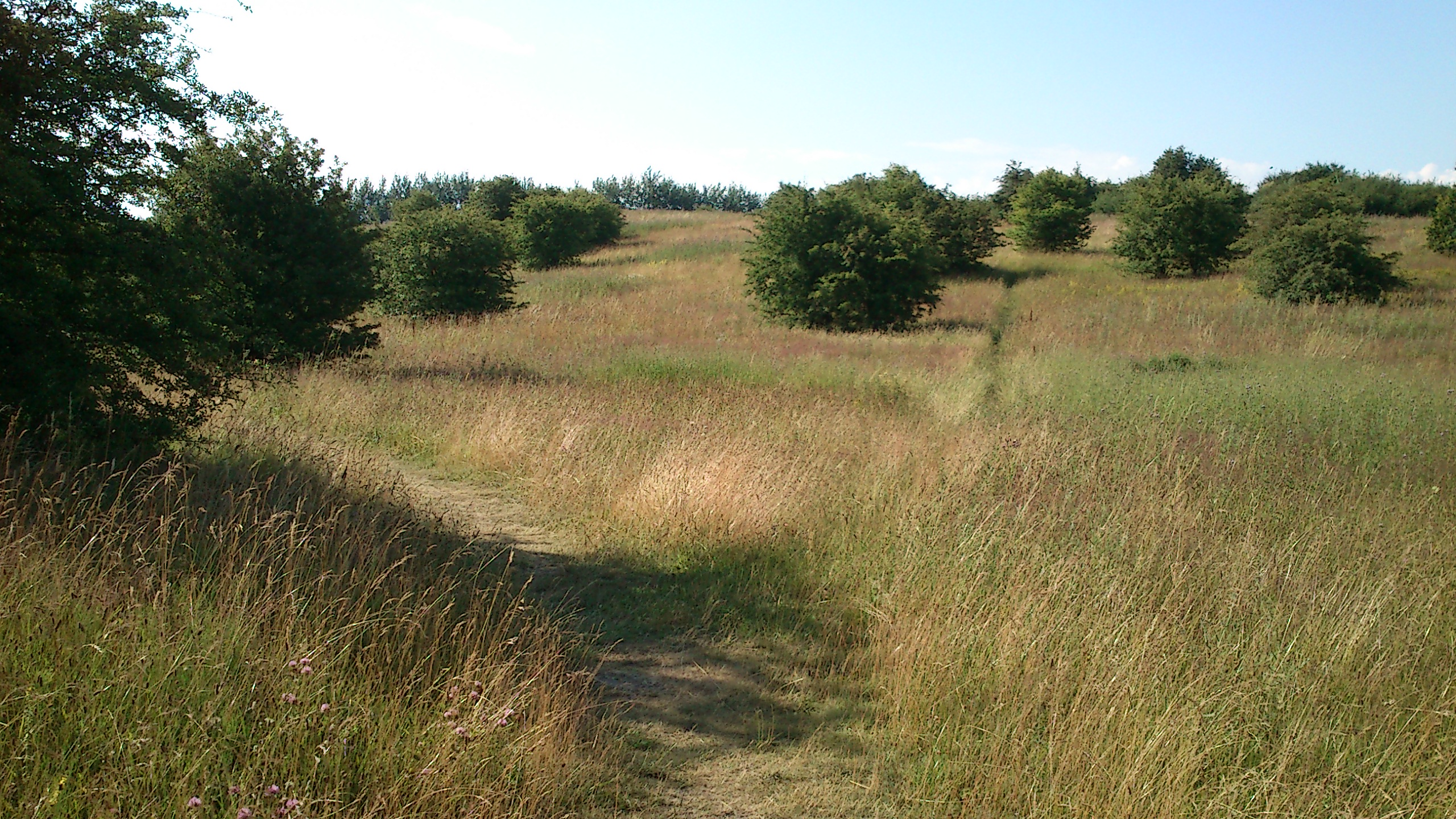
Vestereng in July. The meadows change character throughout the year.

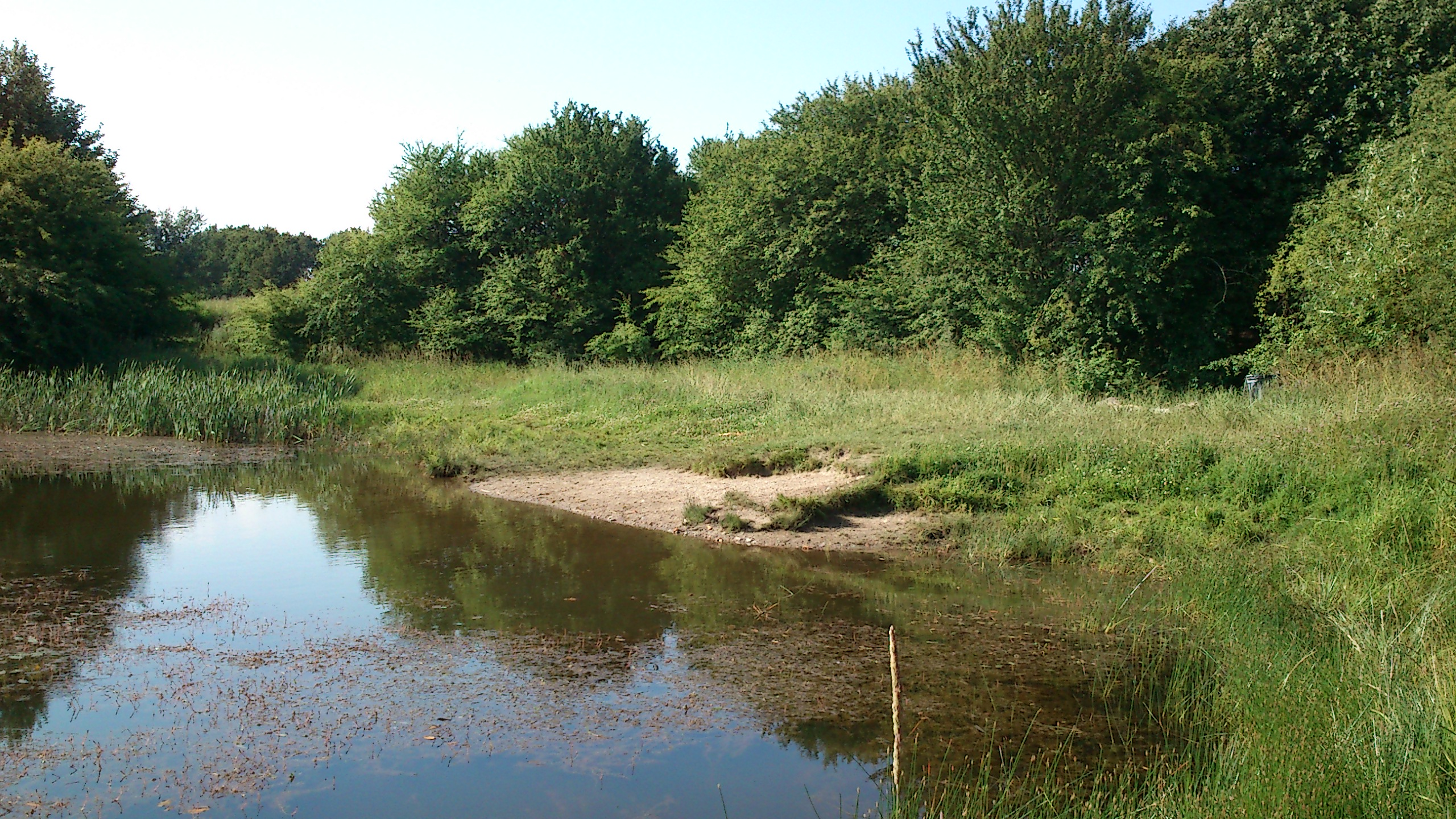
An abandoned marl pit has turned into a small pond (July)

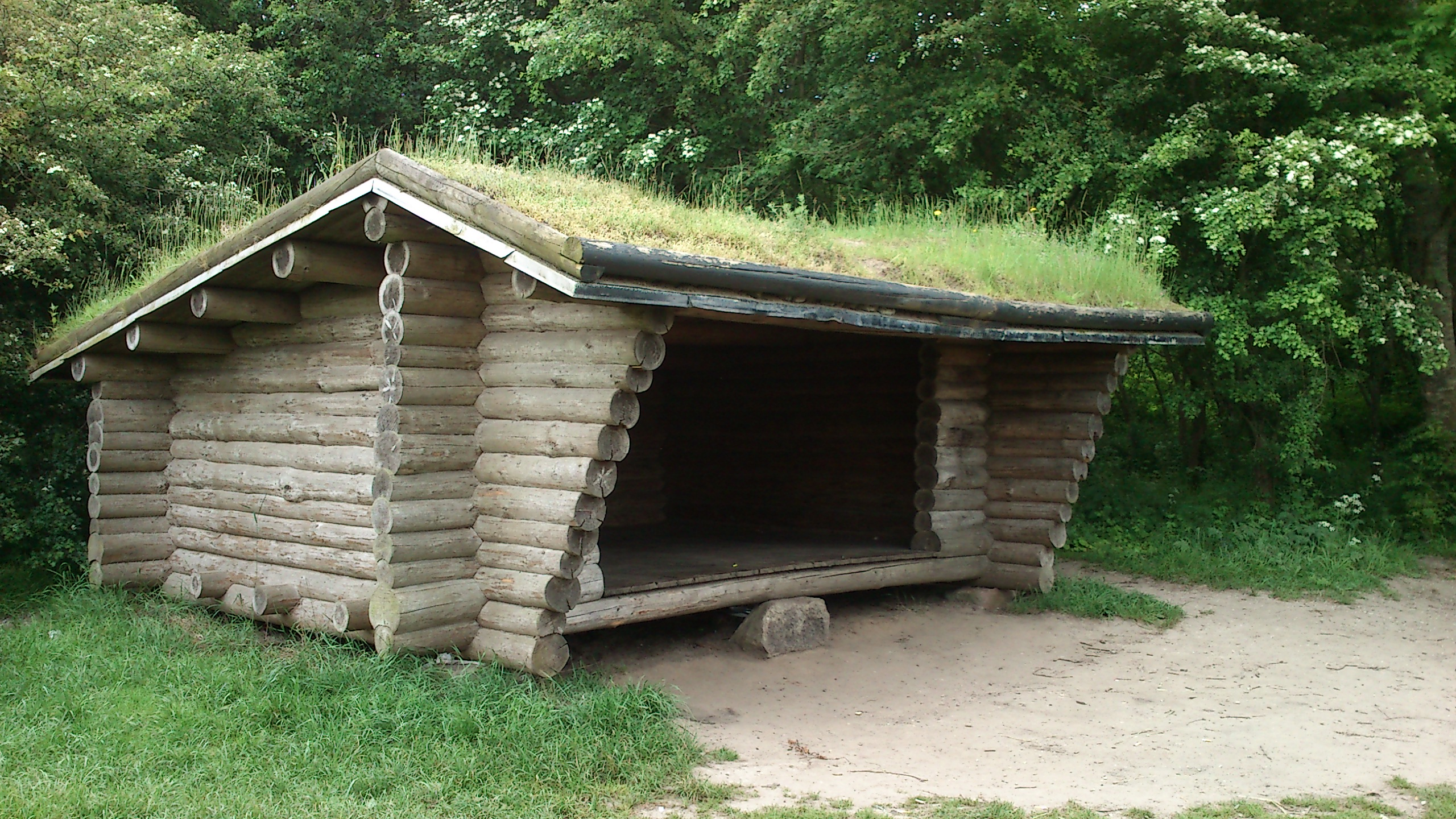
Shelter

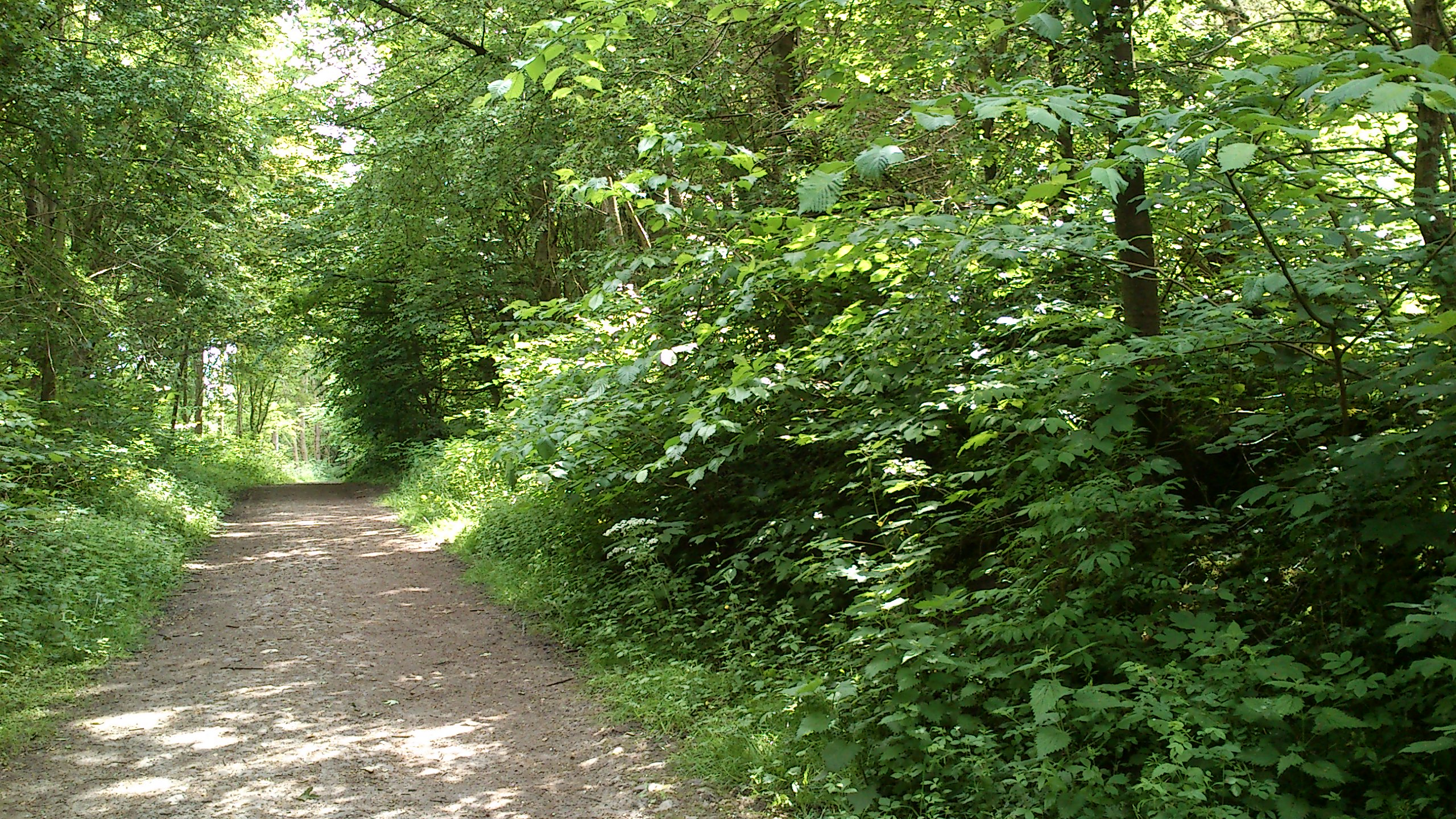
Forest path in June

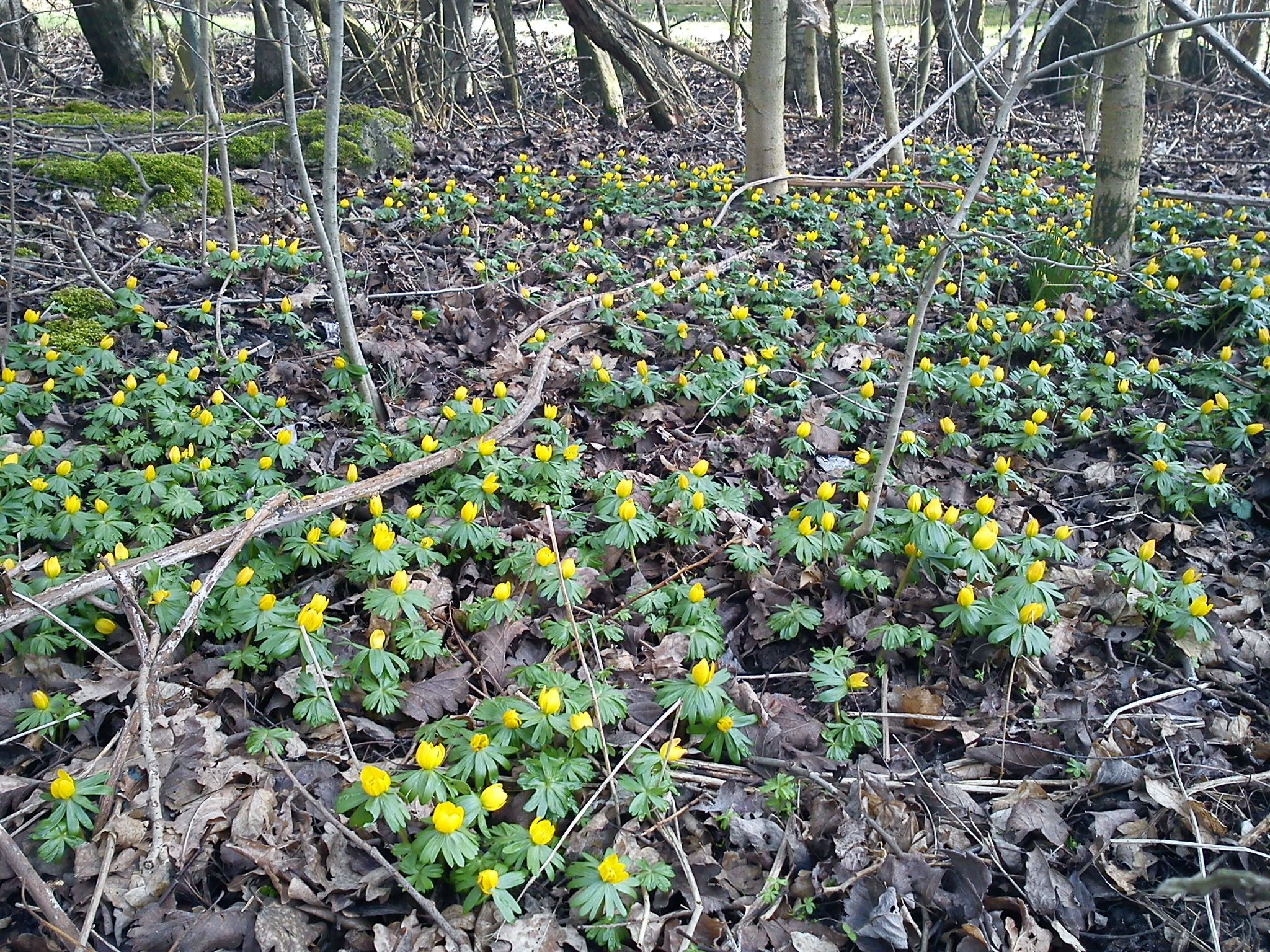
Winter Aconite (eranthis hyemalis) in the forest floor, one of the earliest flowers to appear (March).

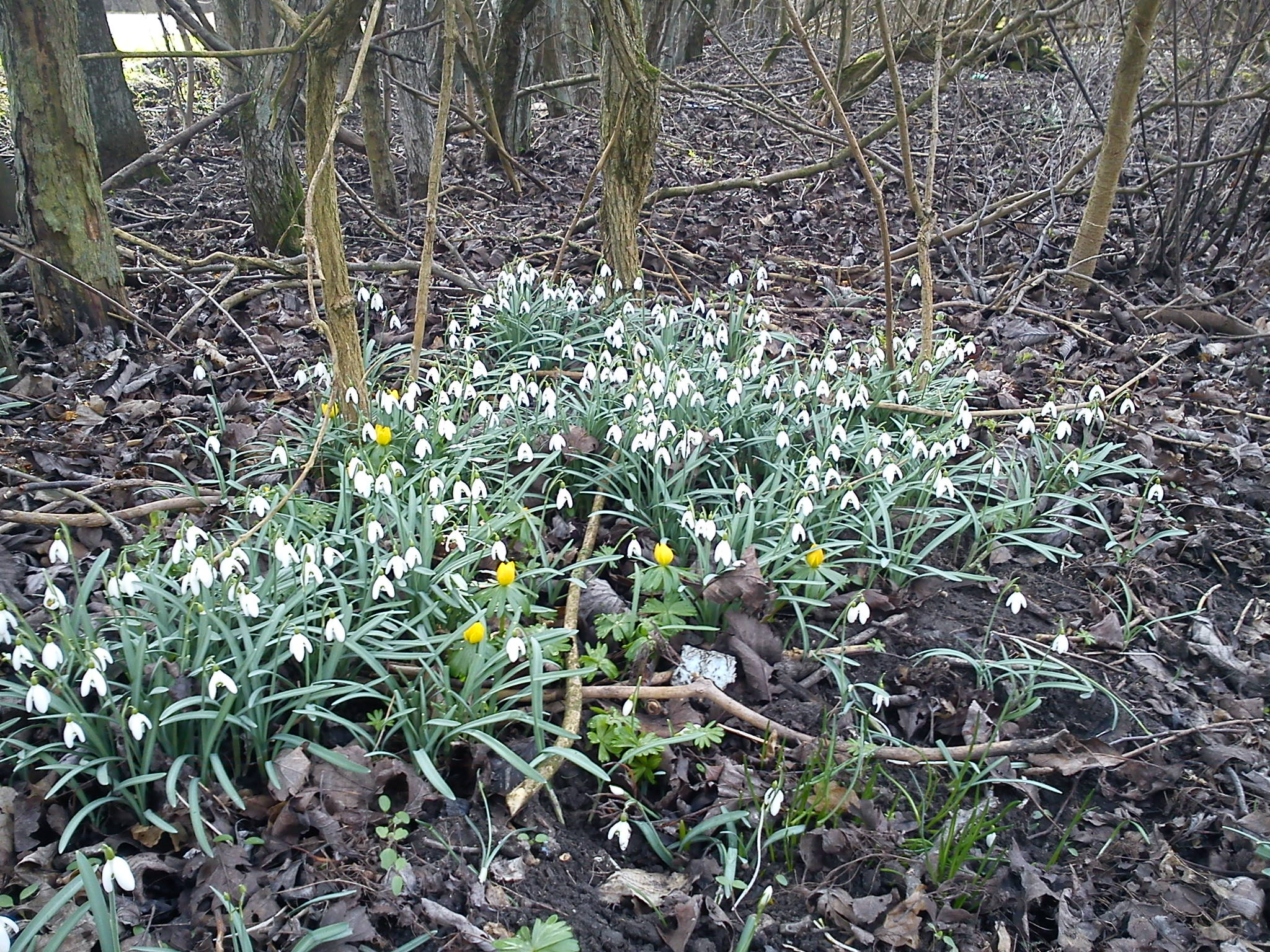
Snowdrop (galanthus nivalis), another early flower in the forest floor (March).

== Sources ==
- Vestereng ULF i Aarhus, Aarhus Municipality (in Danish)
- Vestereng Arrangør i Aarhus, Aarhus Municipality (in Danish)
- Vestereng Aarhus Akademi (in Danish)
- Thorkild Steenberg: Vestereng educational pamphlet (biology), Aarhus Akademi (in Danish)
