= TV 2 Østjylland =

TV2 Østjylland
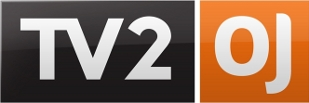
- Country: Denmark
- Broadcast area: Østjylland
- Headquarters: Skejby, Aarhus

Programming
- Language(s): Danish

Ownership
- Owner: TV 2

History
- Launched: 1990

TV2 Østjylland is one of eight regional TV-stations in the TV 2 network in Denmark. The station was founded in 1990, and the first news broadcast was made on 1 April the same year. The station covers the eastern part of Jutland, which includes ten municipalities: Aarhus, Randers, Silkeborg, Horsens, Syddjurs, Norddjurs, Favrskov, Skanderborg, Odder and Samsø.

== History ==
TV2 Østjylland originally started out in an old warehouse in the city of Randers, the second largest city in the station's broadcast area. This was a political decision, meant to force the station to produce news that did not entirely focus on the area's largest city, Aarhus.

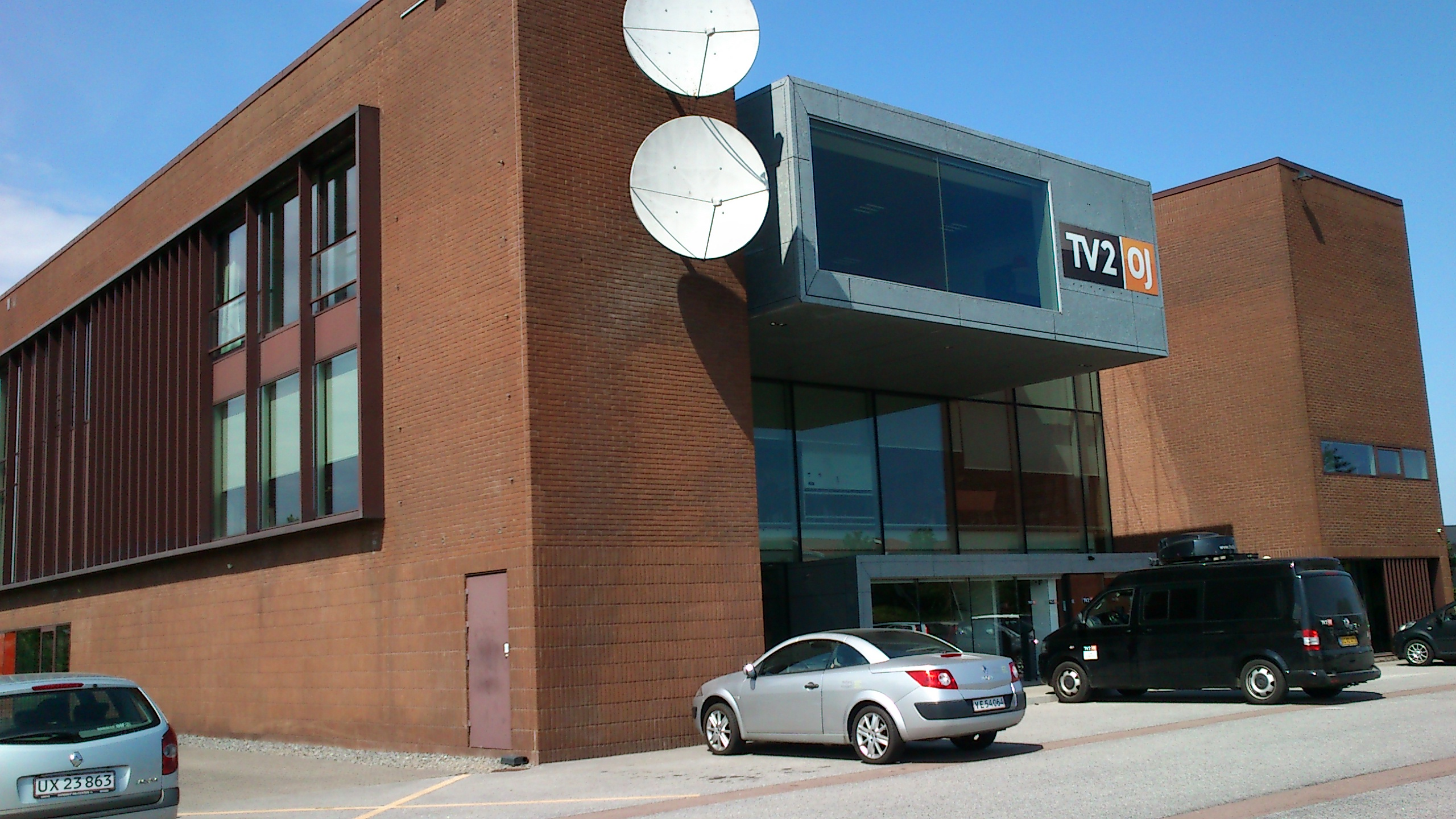
The headquarters of TV2 Østjylland in Skejby.

In 1999 TV 2/Østjylland moved from Randers to a purpose-built TV-station in the northern part of Aarhus, Skejby. The new building was - contrary to the old warehouse in Randers - designed to house a modern TV-station. The new building was packed with new technology. Based on the Sony DNE-2000 news editing system, the new station was completely digital and thereby it was - at the time - the most technologically advanced TV station in Europe.

== Broadcasting ==
The station's motto is "Near and necessary" (Nær og nødvendig, in Danish), a motto the station tries to fulfill by spreading out reporting to even the smallest town in the area of coverage. TV2 Østjylland has the ambition to bring the best coverage and the coverage that is closest to the station's viewers. Therefore, TV 2/Østjylland prioritises the experiences and problems of ordinary people in contrast to "expert sources" in the stations news coverage.

A typical day's broadcast on TV 2/Østjylland starts at 11 a.m. (11.00 o'clock) with a 30-minute program which features the stations most popular reporters such as Kurt Leth, Michael Nørgaard and Anne Louise Tranæs Didriksen. These programs are followed by an inter-regional program called Danmark Rundt. 12.10 a.m. the station broadcasts its most popular talkshow Go' Aften Østjylland a program that embrasses every story rooted in the eastern part of Jutland in a warm atmosphere. This show nearly always includes three interesting guests, their pets, their tricks, their beliefs or simply just their story.

At 4.05 p.m. (16.05 o'clock) TV 2/Østjylland returns with a brief newsbulletin with the day's headlines. This bulletin is preceded by a TV 2-Denmark news update on national and international news.

Another, slightly longer, news update is sent at 6.10 p.m. (18.10 o'clock). This broadcast is also preceded by 10 minutes of national and international news from TV 2-Denmark.

At 7.30 p.m. (19.30 o'clock) TV 2/Østjylland's main news broadcast of the day is aired. 30 minutes of local and regional news, features, and other programs. This program is extremely popular and usually around 2/3 of all TV-sets in the area are tuned in.

From 8-9 p.m. TV 2/Østjylland broadcast an hour on the new regional digital channel Kanal Østjylland. It is here Go' Aften Østjylland has premiere together with many of those longer features that are broadcast in the morning.

At 10.20 p.m. a later and shorter version (8 minutes) of the 19.30-show is aired with new and updated stories.
