= Randlev and Hesselbjerg =

Archaeological sites

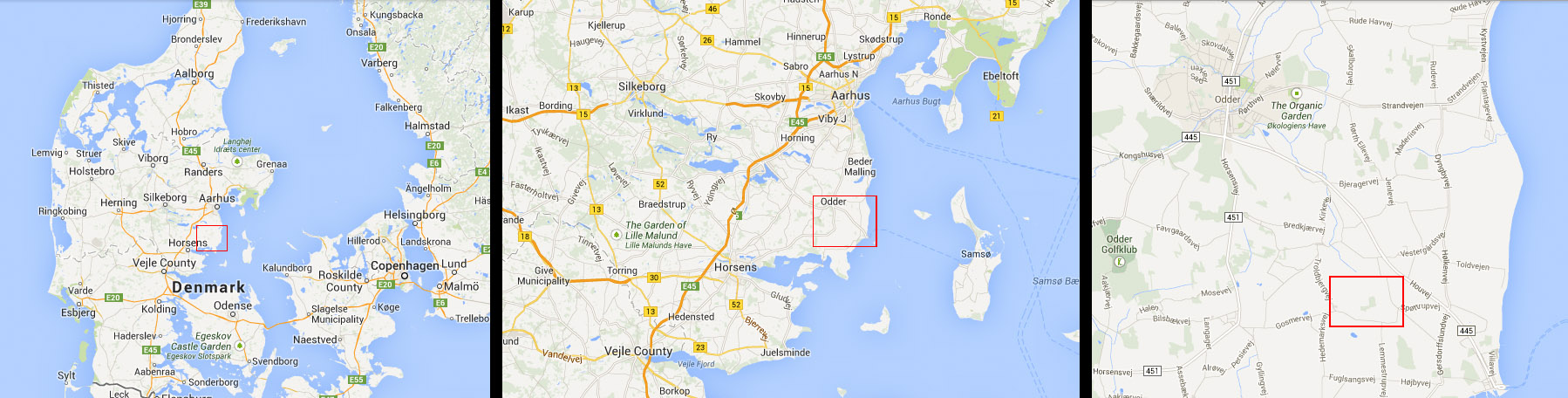
The location of the archaeological sites Randlev and Hesselbjerg in Denmark

The archaeological sites Randlev and Hesselbjerg are two closely related excavations done throughout the 20th century near the village of Randlev in the Odder Municipality of Denmark, three kilometers southeast of the town of Odder. Randlev is known primarily for its Romanesque church constructed sometime around 1100 A.D. Hesselbjerg is the large Viking-Age cemetery discovered on the Hesselbjerg family farm, and the site Randlev is the nearby settlement from the same period. Although both Randlev and Hesselbjerg were contemporaneous and encompass a similar area, Hesselbjerg is more specifically the 104 graves discovered prior to the later excavation at the site Randlev, which pertains to the Viking Age (c. 850 A.D – c. 1050 A.D.) settlement. The settlement consisted of a farm complex that was likely active during the ninth and tenth centuries; finds from the site such as silver hoards and elaborate jewelry indicate that the farm was likely prosperous, a conjecture supported by the extremely fertile land surrounding the area. Artifacts were found in the vicinity of the Hesselbjerg and Randlev sites as early as 1932 when a local farmer discovered a silver hoard, but serious excavations were not conducted until 1963. These excavations ended in 1970; Moesgård Museum later returned to the site in 1997 and continued analysis until 2010.

== Hesselbjerg cemetery ==
The Hesselbjerg family farm came into the archaeological spotlight in 1962 when Viking-Age bronze jewelry was found in the field by metal detector hobbyists. The Moesgård Museum, an archaeological and ethnographic museum from the city of Aarhus, took over and managed an extensive excavation between 1963 and 1970. This yielded more finds including three small iron amulets gathered in a ring: Thor's hammer, sickle, and a fire striker. Beyond the finds of these objects, a large Viking-Age cemetery, now called Hesselbjerg, was discovered on the farm. At that time, 48 Viking graves were uncovered, some of which contained extremely well-preserved skeletons. The cemetery itself is located on a narrow, sandy, and flat landscape approximately 300–400 meters long. These finds were taken to Mosegård Museum and the excavation ceased in 1970 due to a lack of funding.

With renewed financial support, excavation resumed in 1997 and by 1999 approximately 2300 square meters were uncovered; the number of graves onsite reached 104. Of the 104 graves, 79 were inhumation burials and 25 were cremation burials. This variation in burial styles is not unusual—Viking burial practices were quite diverse, though cremation was slightly more common than inhumation in Northern Jutland. Cremation graves usually consist of pits in which the burnt skeletal remains are found amidst the remainder of the funeral pyre. The inhumation graves at Hesselbjerg cemetery contained, in general, fairly well-preserved skeletons along with grave goods that varied in value and type according to the age, gender, and status of the deceased. In a few instances, traces of decayed coffins were found outlining the skeletons in the graves.

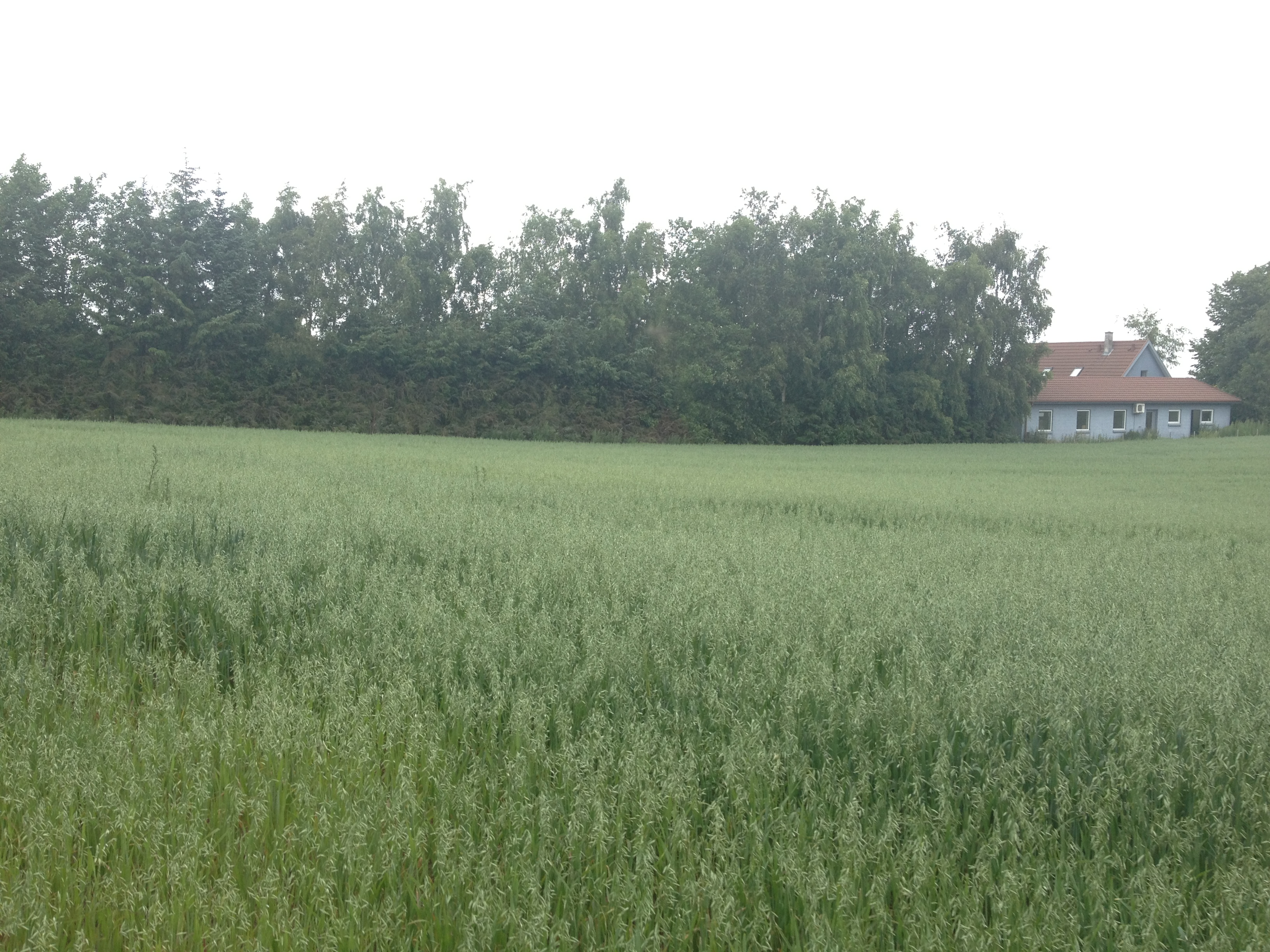
The former burial site at Hesselbjerg, - post-excavation.

The burial site is now considered the largest one of the time period, stretching from the year 800 A.D. until the middle of the 10th century. The finds from the excavation in the nineties included knives, iron belt buckles, whetstones, pottery, a key, another small Thor's hammer made of iron, and a piece of an Arabic coin. A single pit contained numerous glass and amber beads and an elaborately decorated bronze gilt belt buckle.

The cemetery exhibits several characteristics that are slightly unusual for Viking Age burial locations. Over 80% of those interred in the cemetery were women—although it is common for more women than men to be buried in cemeteries, such a majority is rarely seen. Potential explanations for this phenomenon include the idea that many men from Randlev may have died while raiding or trading with other countries, or perhaps simply emigrated to other areas. In addition, only one child's burial was found; although children in the Viking Age were rarely buried in cemeteries, this particular child was treated as though it were fully grown and received grave goods similar to those found in adult graves. The average life-expectancy in the Viking Age was 39 years for men and 42 years for women. Most of those buried at Hesselbjerg cemetery were of the age group 35–55. The bones show signs that these people were hard-working laborers. Generally the dental health was poor; many skeletons were missing teeth or had multiple cavities. In 2009 and 2010, strontium analysis was applied to 18 skeletons from the cemetery. This process compares background radiation an individual was exposed to over the course of their lifetime stored in their bones and teeth to the known background radiation of specific areas. Based on this analysis, 11 of this sample were born and raised in Denmark. The others were clearly foreigners with at least three of them showing Swedish and Polish heritage.

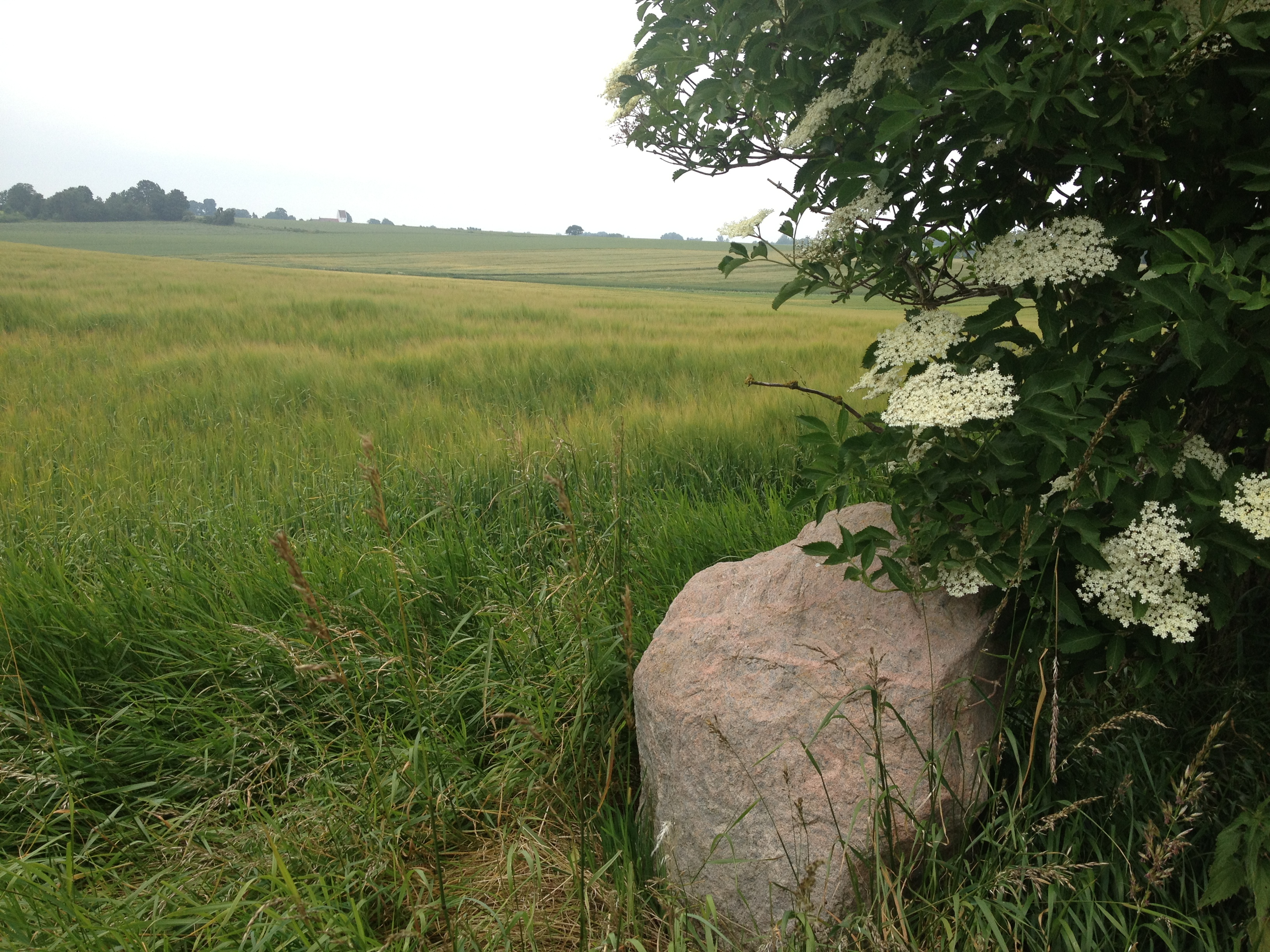
A former grave marker, moved from its original location in Hesselbjerg cemetery.

One skeleton in particular was selected to be extensively scientifically analyzed and facially reconstructed for an exhibit at the Moesgård Museum. The woman was determined to have died in the 10th century at approximately 42 years of age. Though the average height for Viking women was 1.58 meters, this woman measured only 1.5 meters tall. She showed signs of hard work and disease, which was not uncommon either in the Viking Age or in the skeletons excavated at Hesselbjerg. Signs of anemia in her skull were indicative of poor nutrition as a child. Damage to her spine was likely linked to her relatively advanced age, and, like most of the women in the cemetery, she had lost several of her lower molars. In her grave, several artifacts were found: an iron knife (a common grave good) and a bronze pendant inlaid with gold foil and 21 glass beads. Strontium isotope analyses of her bones revealed that, unlike several other women buried in the cemetery, she spent her entire life in Randlev, never traveling outside the immediate area.

=== Notable finds at Hesselbjerg ===
Significant finds from the settlement include crescent and ship shaped jewelry decorated with the motif of a clutching beast with four paws. There was also a sword-amulet and a Thor's hammer.

== Randlev settlement ==
The discovery of the Viking Age settlement near the town of Randlev was prompted in part by the extensive excavations at Hesselbjerg in the preceding years. Viking settlements are difficult to locate, as the sites did not leave many traces in the form of potsherds, waste, or the organic material that was used to construct houses and outbuildings. Therefore, scanning the area near burial sites for metal finds is often an efficient way to pinpoint the locations of settlements. In 1999, support from the Best Eiler Foundation funded a larger excavation that lead to the discovery of the settlement a few hundred meters from the burial. Starting with the approximate location of the silver hoard that was found in 1932, the archaeologists from Moesgård were able to survey the surrounding area with metal detectors to search for indications of Viking occupation. The detectors located jewelry, coins, and other silver, iron, and bronze artifacts from the Merovingian Period.

Though Viking Age burial sites and settlements are found all around Scandinavia, rarely are they next to each other, as they are in this site. Separating the settlement and the cemetery is a ditch which may have at one time contained a small river acting as a boundary-marker. Significant to note is the fact that the burial site would not have been visible from the settlement, despite their close proximity the graves are positioned on the far side of the ridge, hiding them from sight.

=== Excavation and findings at Randlev ===
The Randlev settlement contained hundreds of metal objects, many of which were located with metal detectors prior to breaking ground on the site. Once these finds were documented and recovered, half of the topsoil was removed and the soil was scanned again with detectors. Removal of the remainder of the topsoil revealed traces of features that confirmed human settlement at the site. A total area of 1000 square meters of soil was cleared in the initial excavation of the settlement. Besides the aforementioned metal finds, features included three pit-houses and postholes, which are indicative of larger buildings such as longhouses. Some of the features date to the Early Iron Age, around 1000 years before Vikings inhabited the area.

The discovery of rivets and foundry waste indicated that there had been some craft specialization at the site, with production taking place perhaps in the pithouses. In August 1999, expanded exploration with metal detectors led to the discovery of two house sites. The houses were typical of the Early Viking Age, exhibiting features that were common at the time: slightly curved walls, sturdy roof-bearing posts, and supportive wall-bracing posts. The post holes marking where the walls once stood show that the longhouses were both approximately 15 meters in length. These structures seem to have been constructed around the year 700. Given the proximity to the Romanesque church built in 1100, it is tempting to call these buildings a precursor to the surrounding present-day village of Randlev.

=== Silver hoards and other notable finds at Randlev ===
In 1932, the first of Randlev settlement's three silver hoards was discovered by a local farmer as he plowed his fields. Though the precise location of the find was not documented, the hoard is clearly connected to the settlement. It consists of 237 silver Arab coins, which had been wrapped in birch bark and buried in a clay vessel. Similar caches of Arabic coins, which provide compelling evidence for contact between Vikings and the Arabic world, have been found throughout Denmark at other sites. The coins found in the Randlev hoard were determined based on design to have originated specifically from modern-day Uzbekistan, Caucasus, Iraq, Afghanistan, and Iran. Other coins seem to have been imitations of these Arabic coins that were produced in Russia, likely because Arabic and Viking traders often met on Russia's Volga River. The youngest coin from the hoard dates from 910 B.C.E./11 A.D., during which time the Vikings traded often with the eastern Arab empire. Silver was valued by weight, and therefore many imported coins such as the ones discovered in the hoard would have been melted down or cut to alter their value. Cut coins and plate are considered hacksilver. The dates supplied by the coins aided in precise dating of both the site and cemetery. The subsequent discovery of six additional Arab coins in a recently excavated pithouse has led to speculation that the two coin finds are somehow connected.

A second silver cache, considered to be unassociated with the first, was found approximately 25 meters to the west during the 1990s excavations. It contained jewelry, silver bars, hack silver, and approximately 20 coins, although the objects were somewhat scattered due to soil disturbance from farming activity. Nearby, a silver cup with a sturdy handle was discovered. It dates definitively to the Early Roman Iron Age; it was likely produced in the first or second century A.D. Goblets such as this were a luxury good in Denmark; they were among the first extravagant items to be imported to the north from the Roman Empire. The cup discovered at Randlev is unique, one of only a few ever discovered in Scandinavia.

The third and final silver hoard was discovered with the use of a metal detector near the edge of a large pit. The silver was not found in the form of intact coins, but rather as “hacksilver”—coins that were cut in order to decrease their value and make exchange transactions more precise. In addition, the cache contained four cuttings of silver plate. Though likely used as a form of currency, the silver found in this pit could also have been intended for melting down and reworking.

Though the silver hoards are the most highly concentrated collections of metal artifacts found at Randlev, many other jewelry, silver, and bronze objects were excavated. The scattered nature of the artifacts is attributed partially to repeated plowing of the topsoil. Over seventy jewelry fragments were found around the settlement; some whole articles of jewelry were pieced together with fragments found at different locations in the settlement.

These silver hoards and jewelry finds are indicative of prosperity at Randlev. Contact with outside cultures is apparent, not only because of the Arabic coins, but also because of more mundane materials that were clearly imported. Soapstone and slate whetstones and vessels from Norway were found on the farm, along with quern-stones from the Rhineland. Randlev was clearly well-connected with the world outside Denmark, exhibiting remarkable prosperity and diversity of trade.

== Association with Hesselbjerg ==
Though Randlev and Hesselbjerg stand only a few hundred meters apart from one another and date to the same time period, the definitive evidence of their association came from the discovery of a man's iron brooch found as a grave good in Hesselbjerg cemetery. The pin had been decorated with bronze balls, but one of the ornaments had been broken off along with part of the iron ring that constituted the main part of the pin. The owner continued to use the brooch until it was buried with him. The later excavations at the western edge of the Randlev settlement, approximately 400 meters from the grave, turned up a fragment that proved to be the missing iron ring from the pin. The pin is thought to be approximately 1000 years old. This find clearly demonstrated the linkage between the Randlev settlement where the pin originated and the graveyard where its owner was buried. This is the only known occurrence of a burial site and settlement being linked in such a way.

== Significance of Radlev and Hesselbjerg ==
Randlev and Hesselbjerg are both special sites in the context of Viking Age archaeology. It is rare that two such sites—a settlement and a cemetery—can be so definitively linked. The quality of the grave goods and the finds in the settlement, such as the elaborate jewelry and silver coin hoards, indicates that the area was likely one of some wealth. This affluence could have been due in part to the rich and fertile fields that were ideal for Viking Age agriculture.

== Related literature ==
- Andersen, H. H., & Klindt Jensen, O. (1970): Hesselbjerg. En gravplads fra vikingetid. KUML.
- Klæsøe, Iben Skibsted (2010). Viking Trade and Settlement in Continental Western Europe. Museum Tusculanum Press. ISBN 978-87-635-0531-4.
- Liebgott, Niels-Knud (1978). Danske fund af møntdateret keramik ca. 950-1450. Nationalmuseet. ISBN 978-87-480-0156-5.
