= Torrild =

- Village
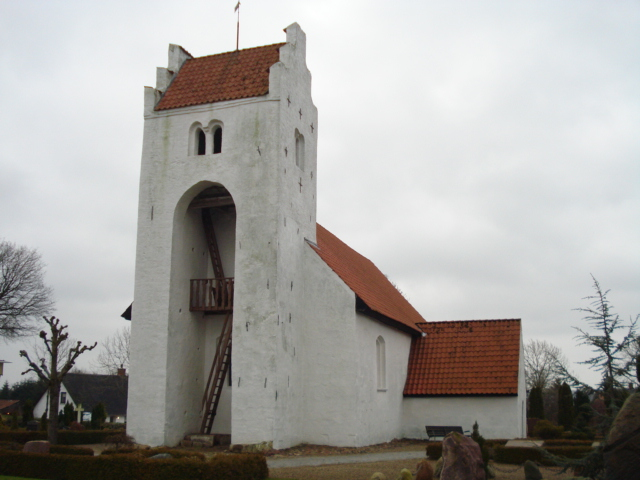
- Torrild Church

- Location in the Central Denmark Region
- Coordinates: 55°58′49″N 10°3′1″E
- Country: Denmark
- Region: Central Denmark
- Municipality: Odder

Population (2026)
  - Total: 214
- Time zone: UTC+1 (CET)
  - Summer (DST): UTC+2 (CEST)

Torrild is a village in Jutland, Denmark located in Odder Municipality.

== Torrild Church ==
Torrild Church is located in Torrild and was built around 1200. The altarpiece is in oak and from 1610 by Oluf Olufsen and Lauritz Andersen Riber. It was restored in 1950 and likely also in 1845. The pulpit is from 1616 and also made by Oluf Olufsen, as well as a painter from Odense. The church bell is from 1756 and made in Viborg.

== Notable residents ==
- Elvin J. Hansen (born 1950), politician and former mayor of Odder Municipality
