= List of public art in Aarhus =

This is a list of public art in the city of Aarhus, in the Central Denmark Region, Denmark. This list applies only to works of public art accessible in an outdoor public space. For example, this does not include artwork visible inside a museum.

== Aarhus ==
=== Midtbyen ===
==== Frederiksbjerg ====
| Image | Title / subject | Location and coordinates | Date | Artist / designer | Type | Material | Dimensions | Designation | Owner / administrator | Notes |
|---|---|---|---|---|---|---|---|---|---|---|
| | Fontænen på St. Paul's Church Square | St. Paul's Church Square 56.146393°N 10.203859°E | 1963 | | Fountain | Granite | | | Aarhus Municipality | |
| | Statue of Enrico Mylius Dalgas | Dalgas Avenue 56.142676°N 10.202094°E | 1901 | Rasmus Andersen | Statue | Bronze | | | Aarhus Municipality | |
| | Statue of Hendrik Pontoppidan | Skanseparken 56.145397°N 10.207466°E | 1903 | Rasmus Andersen, Vilhelm Bissen | Statue | Bronze | | | Aarhus Municipality | |
| | Statue of Hans Broge | Tietgens Plads 56.144567°N 56.144567°E | 1910 | Aksel Hansen | Statue | Bronze | | | Aarhus Municipality | |

==== Vesterbro ====
| Image | Title / subject | Location and coordinates | Date | Artist / designer | Type | Material | Dimensions | Designation | Owner / administrator | Notes |
|---|---|---|---|---|---|---|---|---|---|---|
| | Statue of Steen Steensen Blicher | Aarhus Botanical Gardens 56.159971°N 10.194681°E | | Just Nielsen Sondrup | Statue | Bronze | | | Aarhus Municipality | |

==== Indre by ====
| Image | Title / subject | Location and coordinates | Date | Artist / designer | Type | Material | Dimensions | Designation | Owner / administrator | Notes |
|---|---|---|---|---|---|---|---|---|---|---|
| | Agnethe og Havmanden | Park Allé 56.151450°N 10.202912°E | 1941 | Johannes Bjerg | Fountain Sculpture | Bronze | | | Aarhus | |
| | Fugl med guldæble | Søndergade 56.153073°N 10.205208°E | 1973 | Erik Heide | Fountain, Sculpture | Iron | | | Aarhus | |
| | Fontænen på Frue Kirkeplads | Frue Kirkeplads 56.157765°N 10.204692°E | 1977 | Jens-Flemming Sørensen | Fountain, Sculpture | Granite, bronze | | | Aarhus | |
| | Konen med Hønen | Frederiksgade 56.154655°N 10.204365°E | 1984 | Aage Bruun Jespersen | Fountain, Sculpture | bronze | | | Aarhus | |
| | Flodhesteungen | Frederiksgade 56.155526°N 10.205590°E | 1976 | Aage Bruun Jespersen | Fountain, Sculpture | Granite | | | Aarhus | |
| | Den Svangre | City Hall Park 56.151565°N 10.202039°E | 1955 | Johannes Bjerg | Sculpture | Bronze | | | Aarhus | |
| | Vaagnende kvinde | City Hall Park 56.152607°N 10.202353°E | 1920 | Kai Nielsen | Sculpture | Bronze | | | Aarhus | |
| | Pigen af 1940 | City Hall Park 56.152298°N 10.202468°E | 1941 | Svend Rathsack | Statue | Bronze | | | Aarhus Municipality | |
| | Torvenes Brøndsløjfe, Vanddragen | Store Torv 56.157216°N 10.209439°E | 2003 | Elisabeth Toubro | Sculpture | Steel, diabas | | | Aarhus Municipality | |
| | Equestrian statue of Christian X | Bispetorv 56.156808°N 10.209706°E | 1955 | Helen Schou | Equestrian statue | Bronze | | , | Aarhus Municipality | |
| | Etude | Concert Hall Park 56.152706°N 10.201182°E | 1974 | Anker Hoffmann | Sculpture | Bronze | | | Aarhus Municipality | |

==== Trøjborg ====
| Image | Title / subject | Location and coordinates | Date | Artist / designer | Type | Material | Dimensions | Designation | Owner / administrator | Notes |
|---|---|---|---|---|---|---|---|---|---|---|
| | Statue of Peter Sabroe | Østbanetorvet 56.163413°N 10.215754°E | 1914 | Elias Ølsgaard | Statue | Granite | | | Aarhus | |
| | Dog relief | Skovvejen 56.169193°N 10.219314°E | 1952 | Elias Ølsgaard | Relief | Cement | | | Aarhus | |

==== Nørre Stenbro ====
| Image | Title / subject | Location and coordinates | Date | Artist / designer | Type | Material | Dimensions | Designation | Owner / administrator | Notes |
|---|---|---|---|---|---|---|---|---|---|---|
| | Ålefangeren | Kystvejen 56.162462°N 10.215577°E | 1939 | Jens Jacob Bregnø | Sculpture | Bronze | | | Aarhus | |

=== Viby ===
| Image | Title / subject | Location and coordinates | Date | Artist / designer | Type | Material | Dimensions | Designation | Owner / administrator | Notes |
|---|---|---|---|---|---|---|---|---|---|---|
| | Liggende Pige | Skanderborgvej, Viby 56.130591°N 10.164742°E | 1996 | Gerhard Henning | Sculpture | Bronze | | | Aarhus | |

=== Højbjerg ===
| Image | Title / subject | Location and coordinates | Date | Artist / designer | Type | Material | Dimensions | Designation | Owner / administrator | Notes |
|---|---|---|---|---|---|---|---|---|---|---|
| | Solhesten | Rømerhaven, Mindeparken, Aarhus 56.131167°N 10.206099°E | 1970 | Valdemar Foersom Hegndal | Sculpture | Bronze | | | Aarhus | |
| | Skovguden Pan | Marselisborg Forests, Aarhus 56.125°N 10.215°E | 1938 | Elias Ølsgaard | Sculpture | Bronze | | | Aarhus | |
