= Jens Lind =

Jens Lind may refer to:

- Jens Lind (businessman) (c. 1762 – 1821), sea captain, ship-owner, merchant, landowner, industrialist
- Jens Lind (botanist) (1874–1949), pharmacist and botanist
