= List of churches in Odder Municipality =

This list of churches in Odder Municipality lists church buildings in Odder Municipality, Denmark.

== National Churches ==
=== Alrø Church ===
Alrø Church
- Alrø Kirke
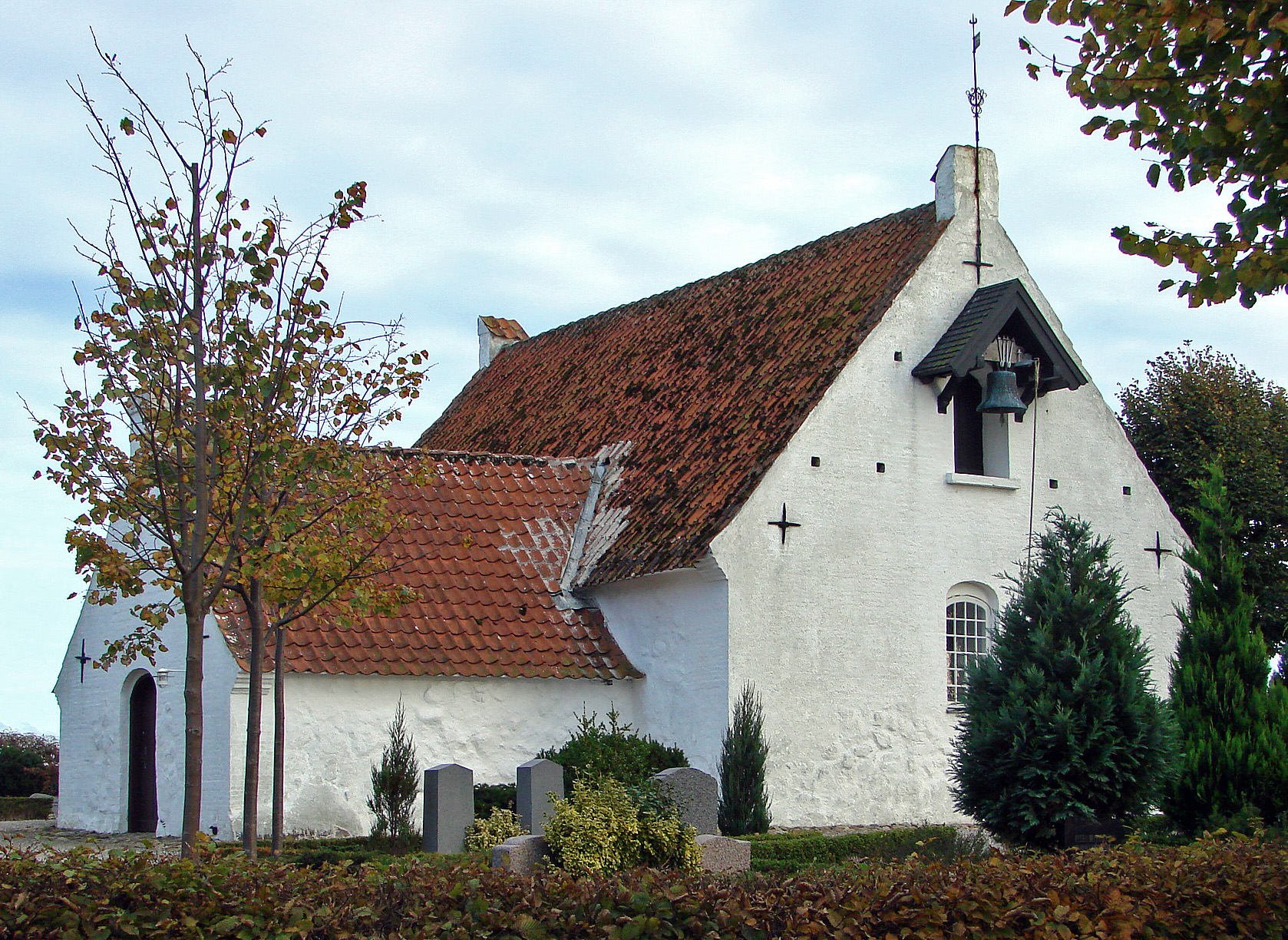
- Alrø Church
- 55°51′23.88″N 10°4′30.23″E
- Location: Alrø By, Denmark
- Denomination: Church of Denmark

Administration
- Diocese: Diocese of Aarhus
- Deanery: Odder Provsti
- Parish: Alrø Parish

Alrø Church is located in Alrø By on the island of Alrø. It is the only national church in Alrø Parish. The church has a churchyard with a cemetery.

Alrø Church was established late in the Middle Ages, possibly not until the 1400s.

The altarpiece is from 1619. The baptismal font is from the 1200s-1300s, and without connection to other baptismal font, making it possible that it was constructed locally.

=== Bjerager Church ===
Bjerager Church
- Bjerager Kirke
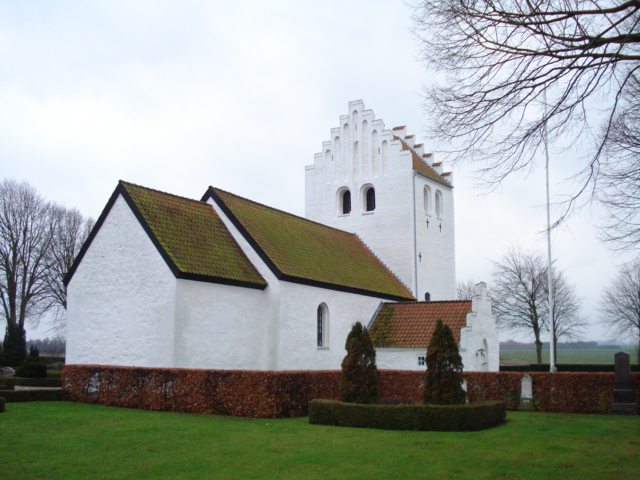
- Bjerager Church
- 55°57′9.9″N 10°12′57.42″E
- Denomination: Church of Denmark

Administration
- Diocese: Diocese of Aarhus
- Deanery: Odder Provsti
- Parish: Bjerager Parish

Bjerager Church is located approximately 500 meters south of Bjerager. It is the only national church in Bjerager Parish. The church has a churchyard with a cemetery.

The altarpiece is from 1617. The pulpit is from 1613 and the sounding board from 1619. The church bell is from 1895.

=== Falling Church ===
Falling Church
- Falling Kirke
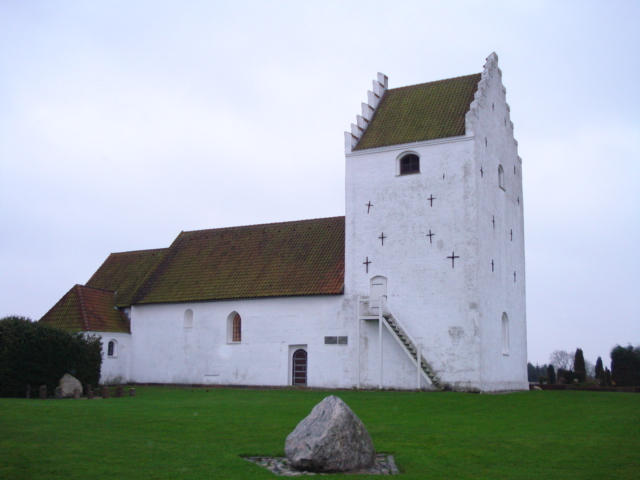
- Falling Church
- 55°54′36.84″N 10°8′10.94″E
- Location: Falling, Denmark
- Denomination: Church of Denmark

History
- Founded: 1100s

Administration
- Diocese: Diocese of Aarhus
- Deanery: Odder Provsti
- Parish: Falling Parish

Falling Church is located in Falling. It is the only national church in Falling Parish. The church has a churchyard with a cemetery.

Falling Church was built in the later half of the 1100s. A funeral chapel was built on the choir's north side in 1748 by the owner of Aakær and the church, Hedevig Margrete Bornemann. She is also buried on the church's cemetery, in a highly decorated coffin in a burial vault from 1750.

The church's altarpiece is from 1635 to 1640 and made by carver Peder Jensen Kolding. The pulpit is in oak and from 1585. The church bell is from the later half of the 1200s.

=== Gosmer Church ===
Gosmer Church
- Gosmer Kirke
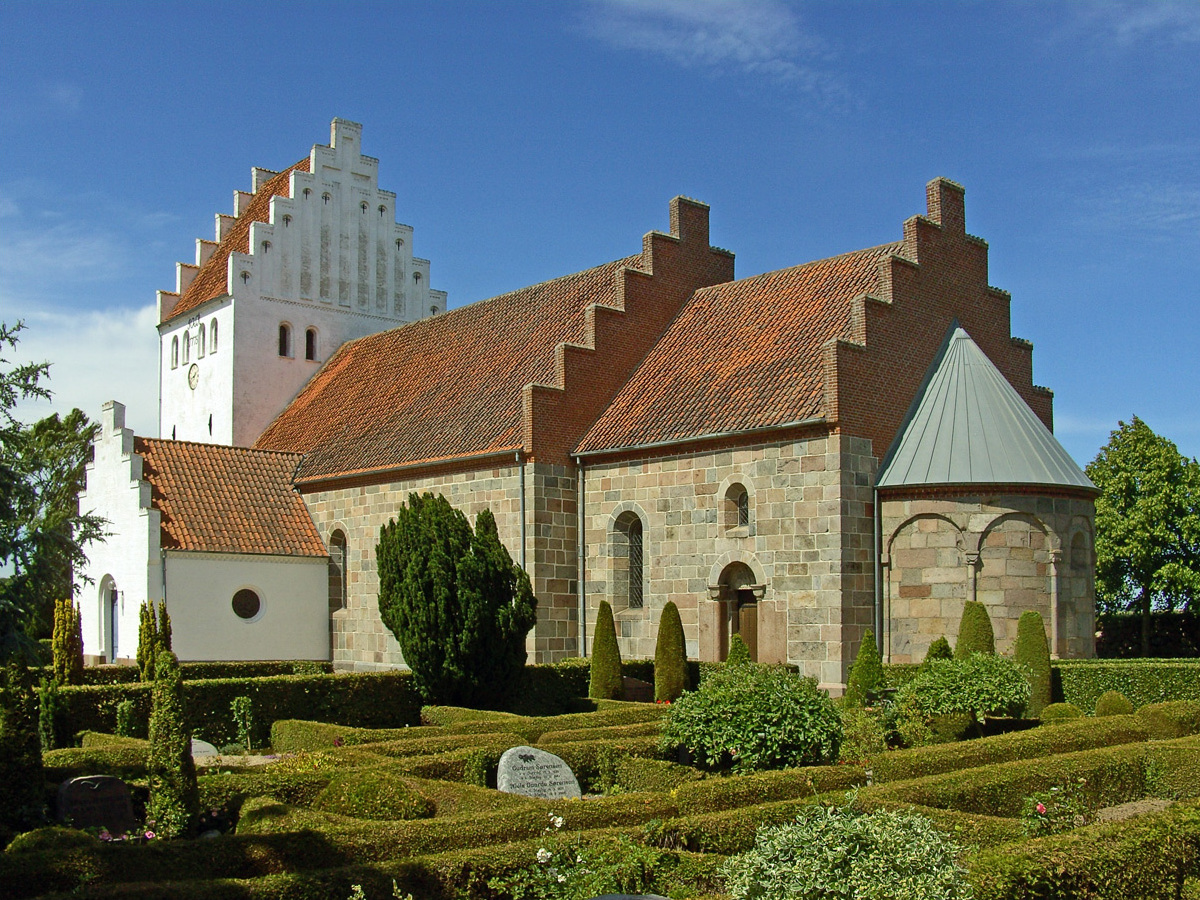
- Gosmer Church
- 55°55′48.5″N 10°11′32.49″E
- Location: Gosmer, Denmark
- Denomination: Church of Denmark

History
- Founded: Ca. 1200

Administration
- Diocese: Diocese of Aarhus
- Deanery: Odder Provsti
- Parish: Gosmer Parish

Gosmer Church is located in Gosmer. It is the only national church in Gosmer Parish. The church has a churchyard with a cemetery.

Gosmer Church was built around year 1200, likely before.

The pulpit is from 1637, and carved by Peder Jensen Kolding. The turret clock is from 1871. A previous turret clock is mentioned from 1661 and until 1863, where the desire for acquiring a new clock was stated.

=== Gylling Church ===
Gylling Church
- Gylling Kirke
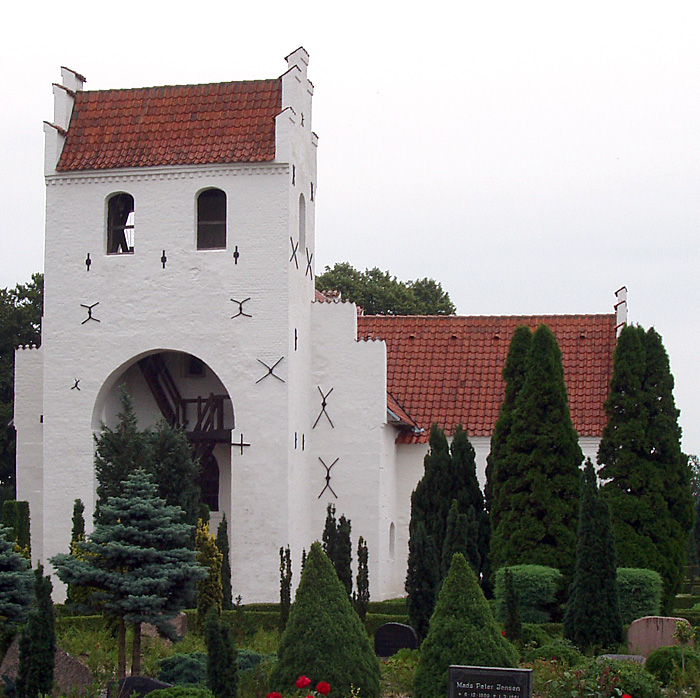
- Gylling Church
- 55°53′25.25″N 10°9′52.68″E
- Location: Gylling, Denmark
- Denomination: Church of Denmark

History
- Founded: 1100s

Administration
- Diocese: Diocese of Aarhus
- Deanery: Odder Provsti
- Parish: Gylling Parish

Gylling Church is located in Gylling. It is the only national church in Gylling Parish. The church has a churchyard with a cemetery.

Gylling Church was built in the later half of the 1100s.

The pulpit is from 1911. The church bell is from around year 1350. Several tombstones are preserved in the church, including a runestone from the Viking Age.

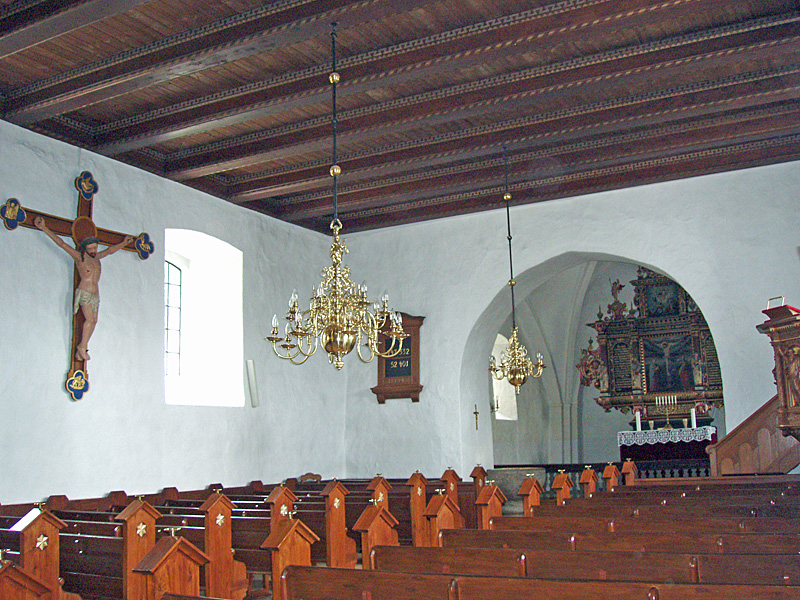
Church interior

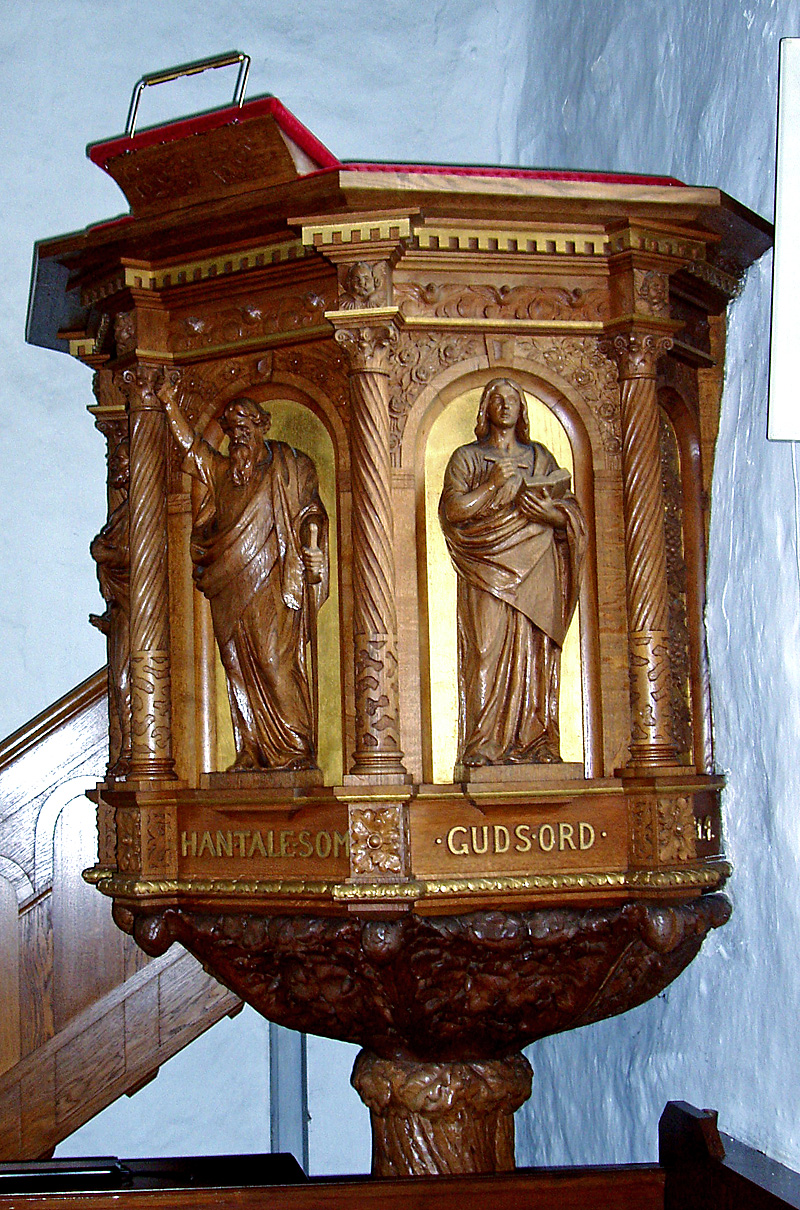
Pulpit

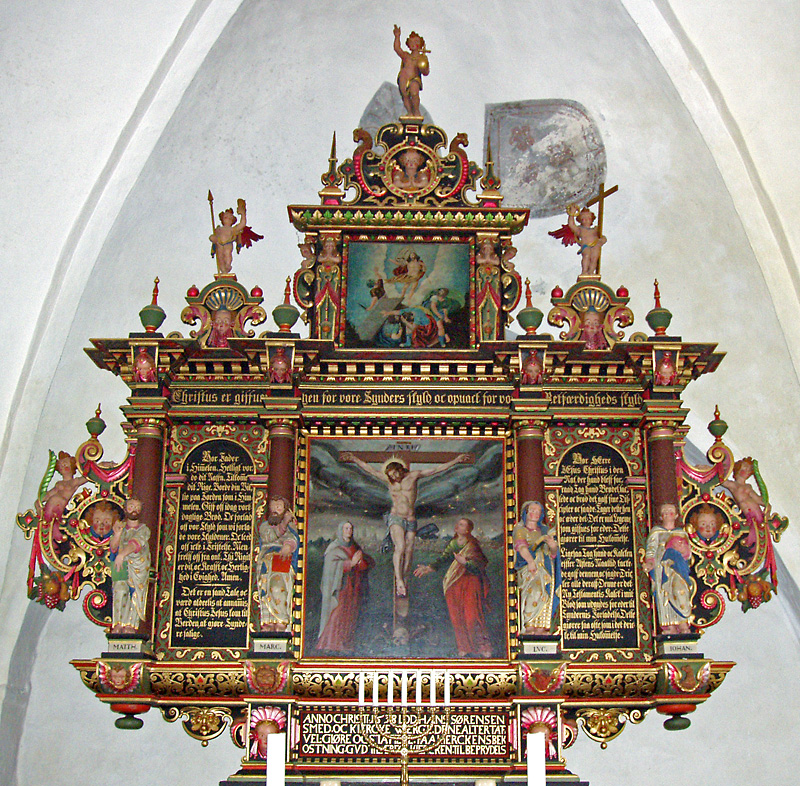
Altarpiece

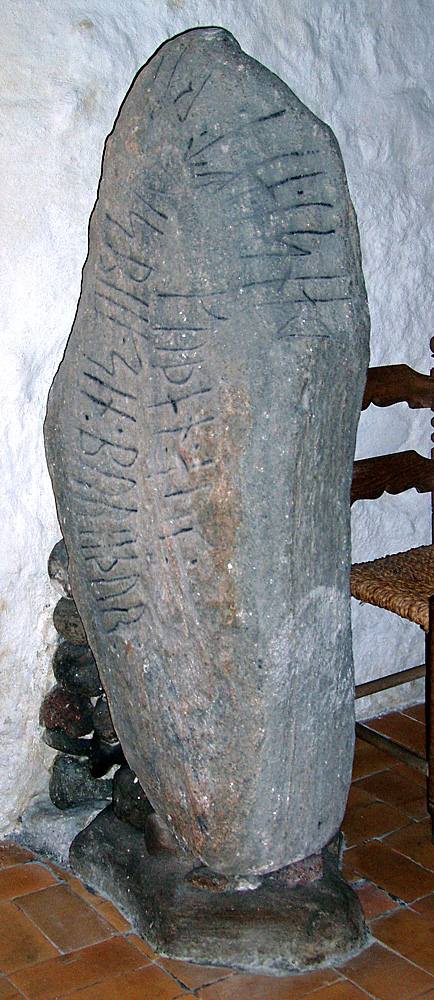
Runestone

=== Halling Church ===
Halling Church
- Halling Kirke
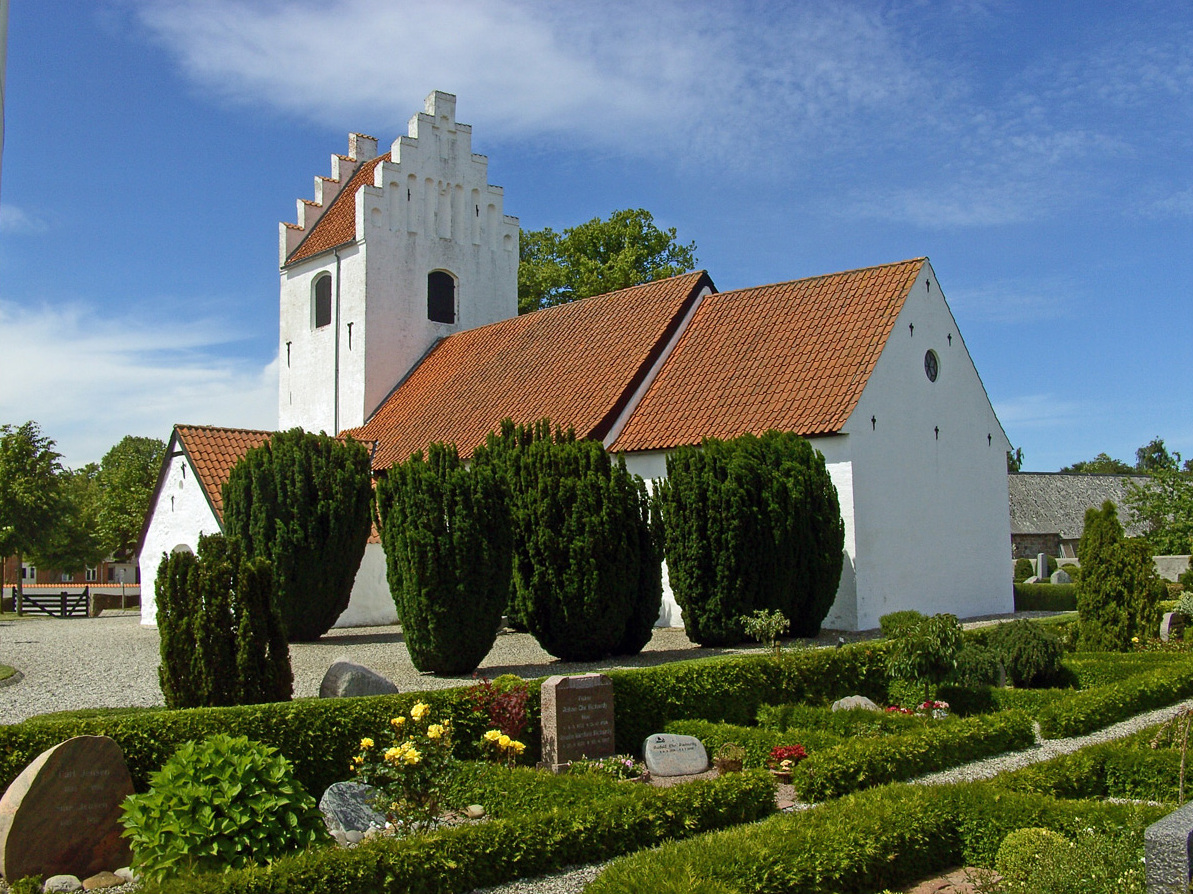
- Halling Church
- 55°55′46.1″N 10°13′22.04″E
- Location: Halling, Denmark
- Denomination: Church of Denmark

History
- Founded: Ca. 1200

Administration
- Diocese: Diocese of Aarhus
- Deanery: Odder Provsti
- Parish: Halling Parish

Halling Church is located in Halling. It is the only national church in Halling Parish. The church has a churchyard with a cemetery.

Halling Church was built around year 1200.

=== Hundslund Church ===
Hundslund Church
- Hundslund Kirke
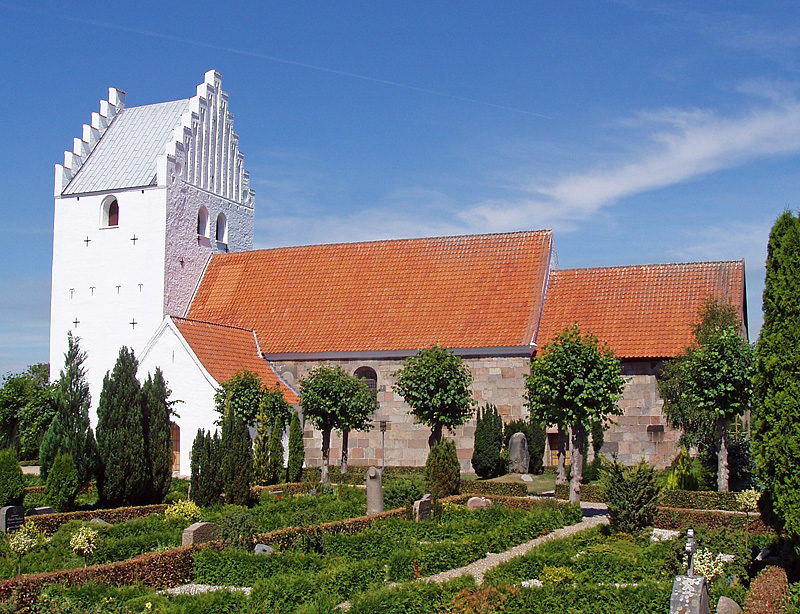
- Hundslund Church
- 55°54′55.06″N 10°2′56.87″E
- Location: Hundslund, Denmark
- Denomination: Church of Denmark

History
- Founded: 1100s

Administration
- Diocese: Diocese of Aarhus
- Deanery: Odder Provsti
- Parish: Hundslund Parish

Hundslund Church is located in Hundslund. It is the only national church in Hundslund Parish. The church has a churchyard with a cemetery.

The nave and choir were built in the 1100s, with the church porch built late in the 1400s.

The altarpiece was made in 1613 in the former village of Vrold, which has today merged with Skanderborg. The pulpit is from around 1600 and the sounding board from around 1700.

=== Nølev Church ===
Nølev Church
- Nølev Kirke
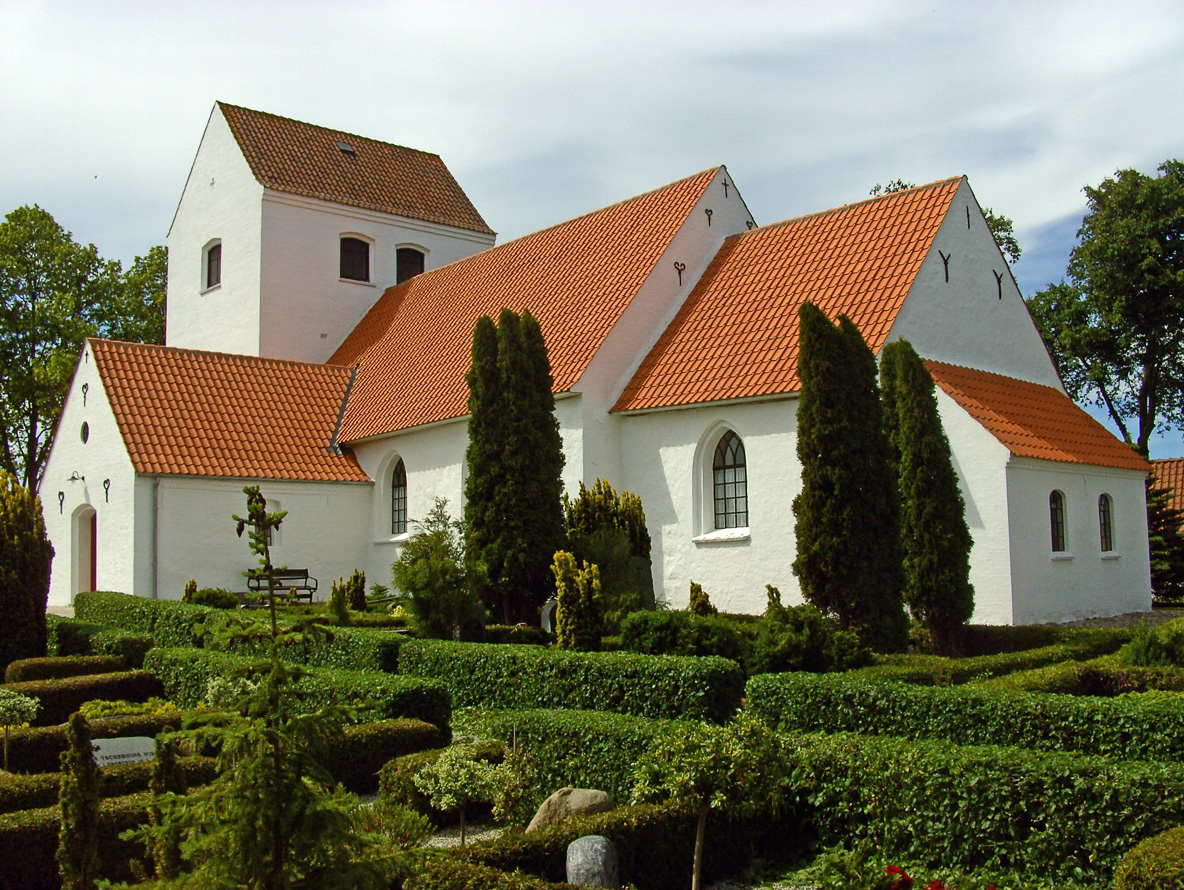
- Nølev Church
- 55°59′43.79″N 10°11′22.07″E
- Location: Nølev, Denmark
- Denomination: Church of Denmark

History
- Founded: 1200s

Administration
- Diocese: Diocese of Aarhus
- Deanery: Odder Provsti
- Parish: Nølev Parish

Nølev Church is located in Nølev. It is the only national church in Nølev Parish. The church has a churchyard with a cemetery.

Nølev Church was built in the 1200s. The tower was built in 1952.

The pulpit and sounding board are from around 1625–1640. An organ from 1890 to 1903 was in 1941 donated to Lild Church. The current organ was built in 1937 by A. C. Zachariasen from Aarhus, and was donated by Ane Albech.

=== Odder Parish Church ===
Odder Parish Church
- Odder Sognekirke
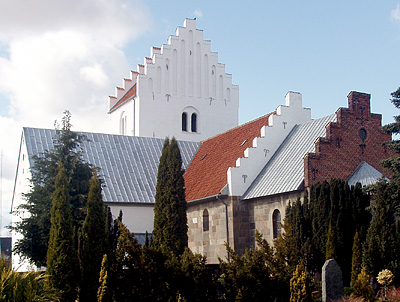
- Odder Parish Church
- 55°58′22.81″N 10°9′8.75″E
- Location: Odder, Denmark
- Denomination: Church of Denmark

History
- Founded: 1100s

Administration
- Diocese: Diocese of Aarhus
- Deanery: Odder Provsti
- Parish: Odder Parish

Odder Parish Church is located in Odder. It is the only national church in Odder Parish. The church has a churchyard with a cemetery.

Odder Parish Church was built in the later half of the 1100s.

The altarpiece is from 1640 and made by Peder Jensen Kolding. It portrays the Last Supper and in front of the two pillars are figures of the evangelists of Luke and John. Models of Matthew and Mark sit on top of the altarpiece. On top of the altarpiece is also a model of the Crucifixion of Jesus. The church's pulpit is from 1590 to 1600 and the sounding board from 1703. The two church bells are from 1847 and 1854 respectively, and both from Copenhagen. The church once had a turret clock from 1656, but when the clock was unable to be repaired in 1856, the clock was removed and despite the church's desire for a new, a new clock was never acquired.

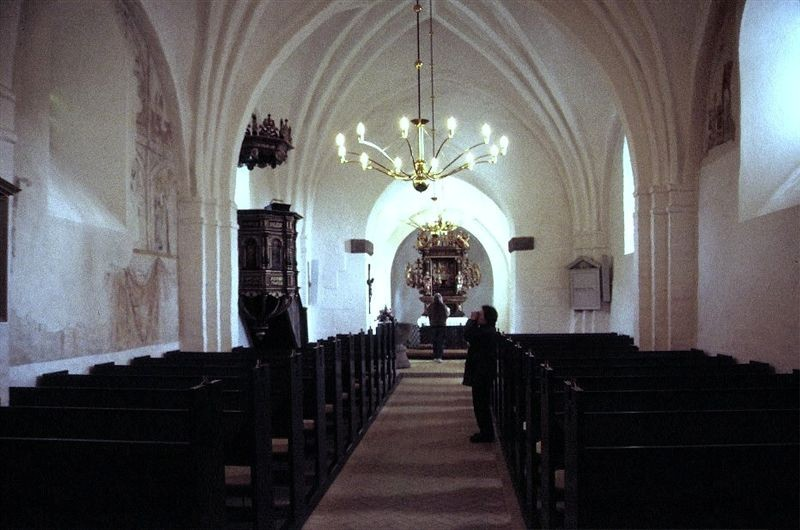
Church interior

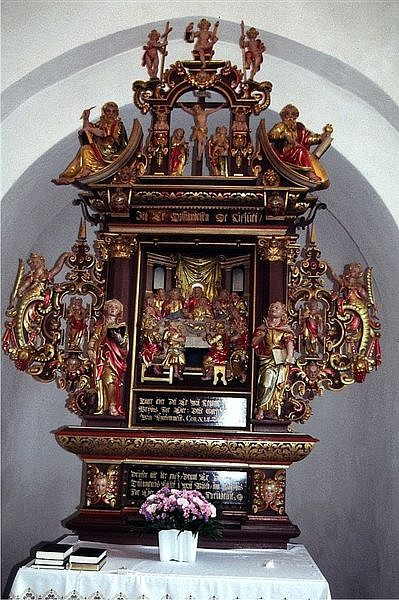
Altarpiece

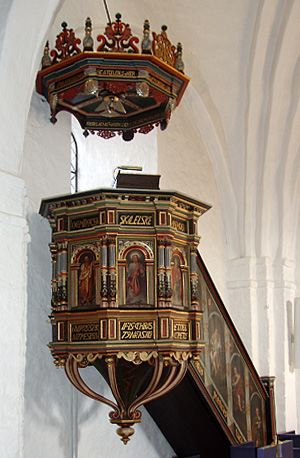
Pulpit

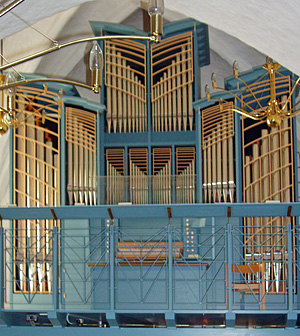
Organ

=== Randlev Church ===
Randlev Church
- Randlev Kirke
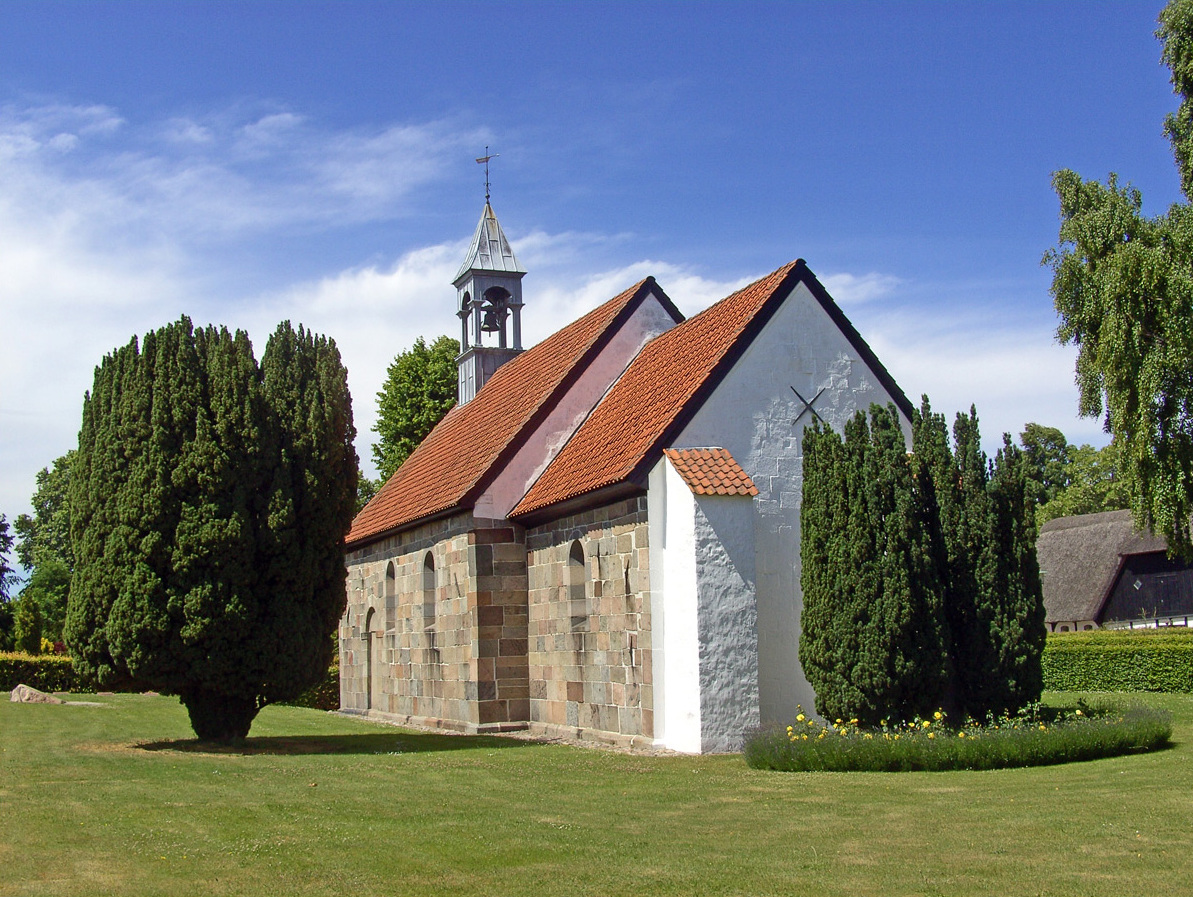
- Randlev Church
- 55°56′38.26″N 10°11′10.42″E
- Location: Over Randlev, Denmark
- Denomination: Church of Denmark

History
- Founded: Ca. 1125

Administration
- Diocese: Diocese of Aarhus
- Deanery: Odder Provsti
- Parish: Randlev Parish

Randlev Church is located in Over Randlev. It is the only national church in Randlev Parish. The church has a churchyard with a cemetery.

The choir and nave were built around 1125. The church porch is from 1894.

The pulpit is from around 1625–40.

=== Saksild Church ===
Saksild Church
- Saksild Kirke
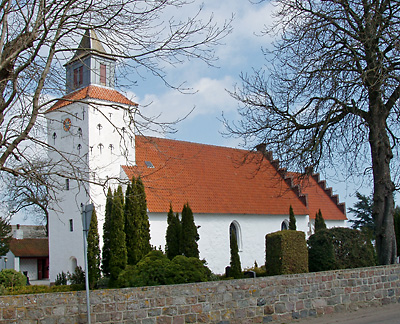
- Saksild Church
- 55°58′25.75″N 10°14′5.02″E
- Location: Saksild, Denmark
- Denomination: Church of Denmark

History
- Founded: Ca. 1200

Administration
- Diocese: Diocese of Aarhus
- Deanery: Odder Provsti
- Parish: Saksild Parish

Saksild Church is located in Saksild. It is the only national church in Saksild Parish. The church has a churchyard with a cemetery.

Saksild Church is from around 1200. The church porch is from the 1500s.

The altarpiece is from 1650 to 1660 and made by Peder Jensen Kolding.

=== Torrild Church ===
Torrild Church
- Torrild Kirke
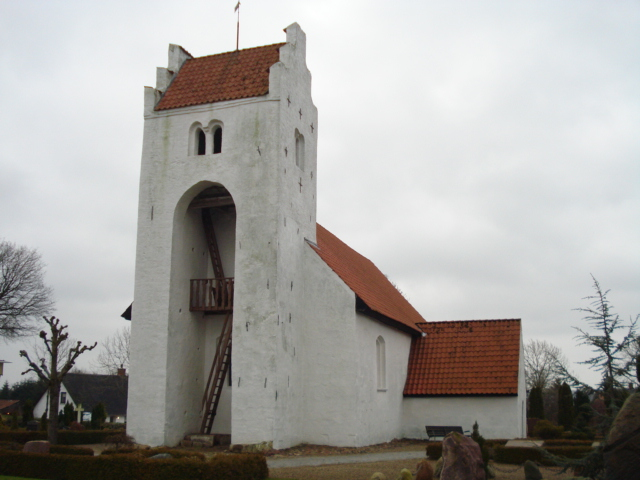
- Torrild Church
- 55°58′48.94″N 10°3′1.34″E
- Location: Torrild, Denmark
- Denomination: Church of Denmark

History
- Founded: Ca. 1200

Administration
- Diocese: Diocese of Aarhus
- Deanery: Odder Provsti
- Parish: Torrild Parish

Torrild Church is located in Torrild. It is the only national church in Torrild Parish. The church has a churchyard with a cemetery.

Torrild Church was built around 1200.

The altarpiece is in oak and from 1610 by Oluf Olufsen and Lauritz Andersen Riber. It was restored in 1950 and likely also in 1845. The pulpit is from 1616 and also made by Oluf Olufsen, as well as a painter from Odense. The church bell is from 1756 and made in Viborg.

=== Tunø Church ===
Tunø Church
- Tunø Kirke
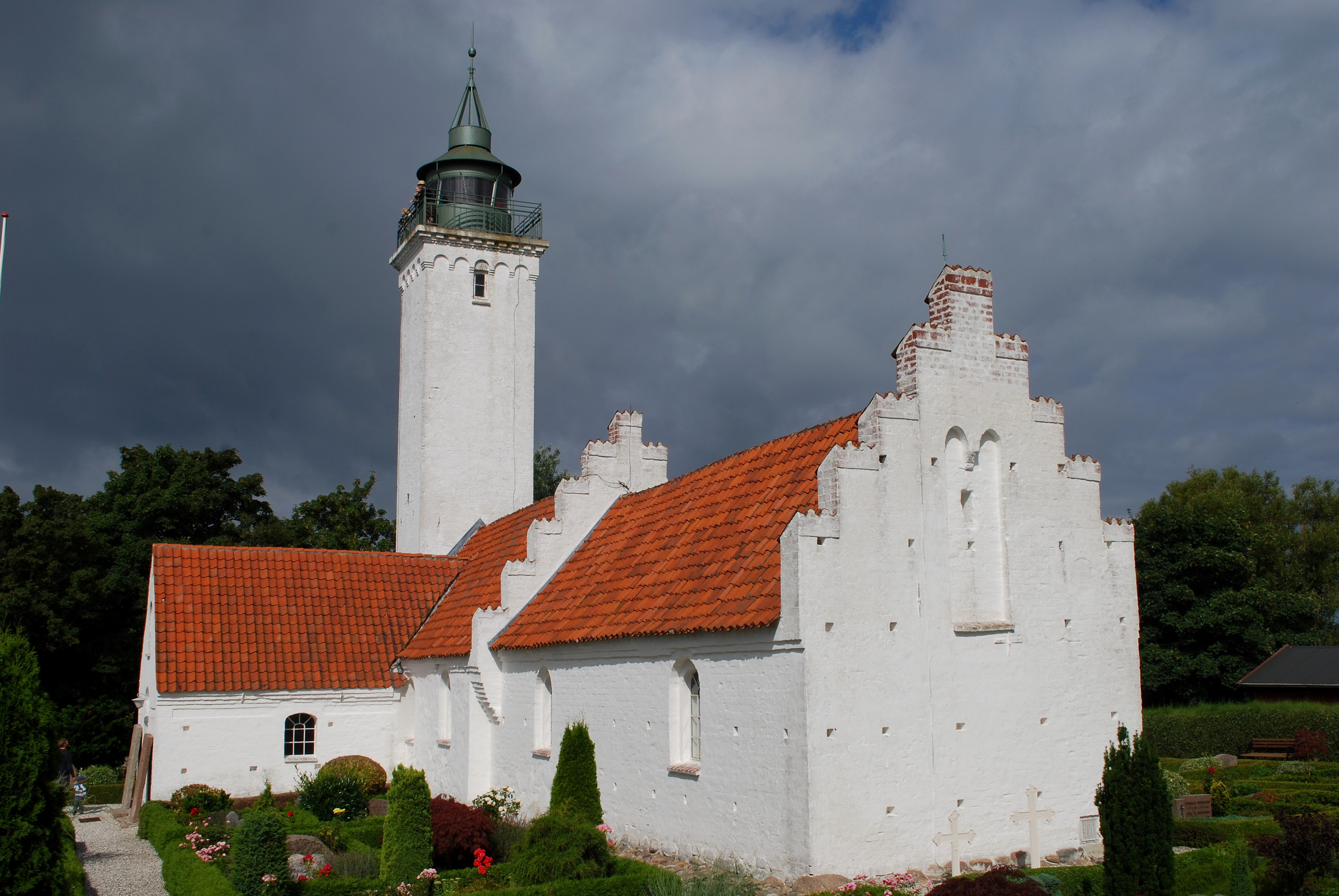
- Tunø Church
- 55°56′58.2″N 10°26′37.91″E
- Location: Tunø By, Denmark
- Denomination: Church of Denmark

History
- Founded: 1300s

Administration
- Diocese: Diocese of Aarhus
- Deanery: Odder Provsti
- Parish: Tunø Parish

Tunø Church and lighthouse is located in Tunø By on the island of Tunø. It is the only national church in Tunø Parish. The church has a churchyard with a cemetery.

The nave and choir were built in the 1300s. Before the construction of the church, the citizens of Tunø had to travel to Samsø and use Nordby Church. The church tower needed repairs in the 1770s, and due to the large expenses it was argued that the tower should be torn down. It was an important landmark for the maritime traffic around the island, however, and the repairs went through. In 1796 talks about construction of a lighthouse on the island began, and the lighthouse was constructed in the church's tower in 1800, and began use in 1801. From then on the priest of Tunø Church acted as both priest and lighthouse keeper. The tower was expanded in 1906.

The altarpiece is from the late 1400s, with paintings of the four evangelists painted on around 1731. It features a model of Virgin Mary, with Saint Clement to one side and Saint Alexius to the other side. The altarpiece was restored in Aarhus in 1869. The pulpit and sounding board are from the earlier half of the 1600s. The church ship was donated to the church in 1842 by I.P. Rasmussen. It is a model of the Danish ship of the line Louise Augusta from 1783. The church ship was repaired in 1930. The church bell is from 1817.

Altarpiece

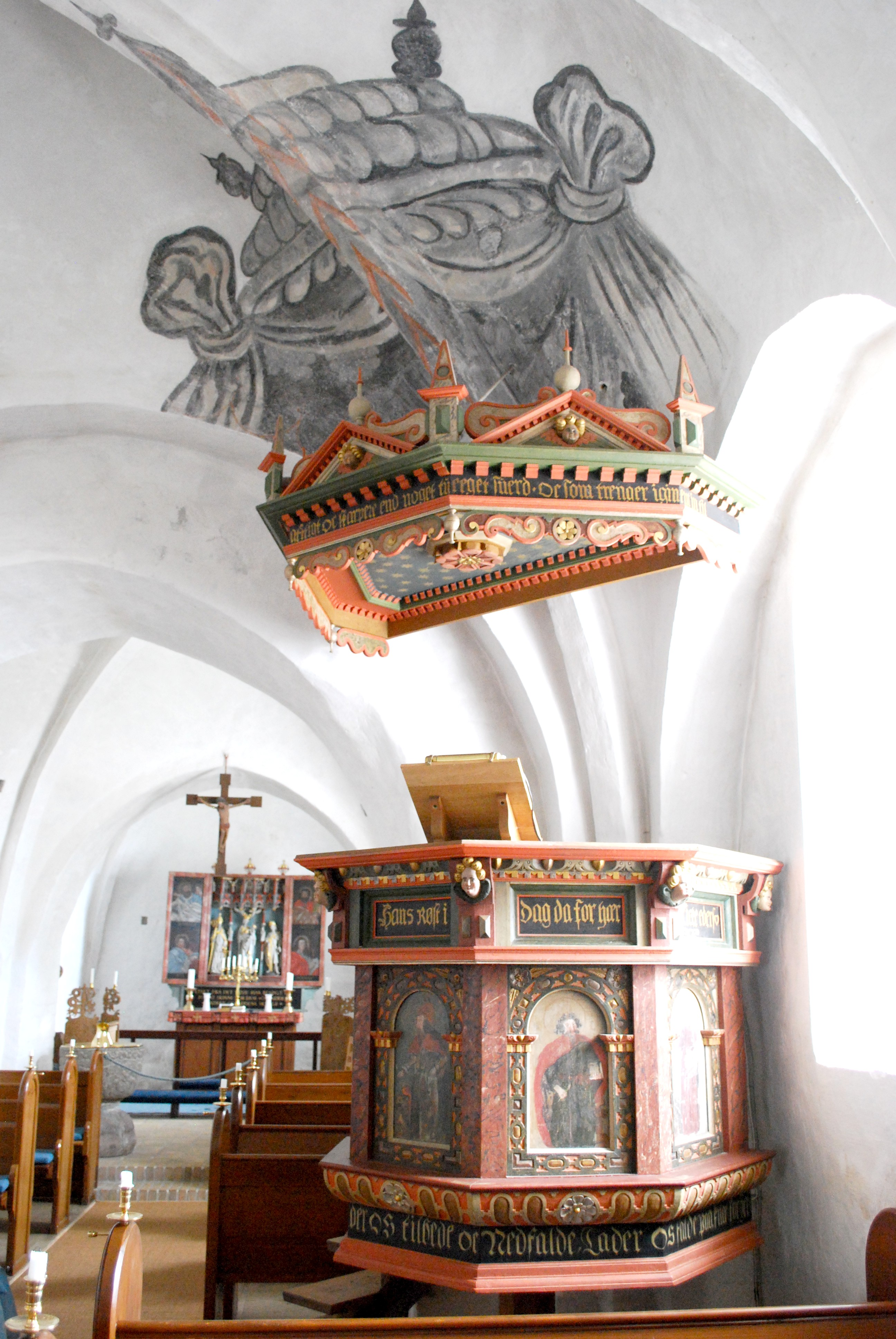
Pulpit

Votive ship Louise Augusta

=== Ørting Church ===
Ørting Church
- Ørting Kirke
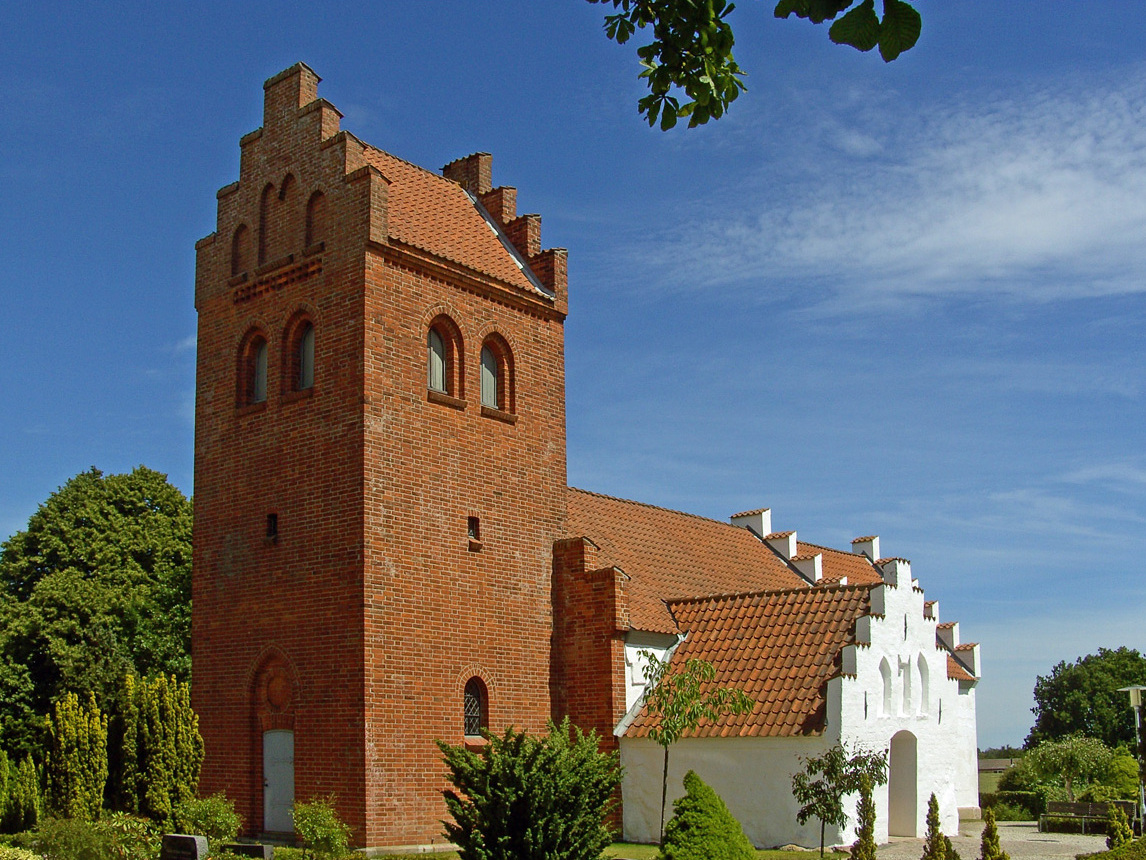
- Ørting Church
- 55°55′40.29″N 10°8′37.94″E
- Location: Ørting, Denmark
- Denomination: Church of Denmark

History
- Founded: Ca. 1200

Administration
- Diocese: Diocese of Aarhus
- Deanery: Odder Provsti
- Parish: Ørting Parish

Ørting Church is located in Ørting. It is the only national church in Ørting Parish. The church has a churchyard with a cemetery.

Ørting Church was built around 1200.

== Independent churches ==
=== Odder Grundtvigian Independent Church ===
Odder Grundtvigian Independent Church
- Odder Grundtvigske Valgmenighedskirke
- 55°58′26.8″N 10°9′33.03″E
- Location: Odder, Denmark
- Denomination: Grundtvigianism

Architecture
- Completed: 1886

Odder Grundtvigian Independent Church is located in Odder. It is one of two churches in Odder Parish, though being an independent church it isn't affiliated with the parish. The church has a churchyard with a cemetery.

It is a church, independent from the Church of Denmark, though largely with the same beliefs. The congregation was founded in 1884 and the church built in 1885 and opened in 1886.

The drawings for the church were made by Christen Jensen. The altarpiece displays a young Jesus, and is made by Troels Trier. The organ is from 1899, made by Frederik Nielsen from Aarhus.
