= Rasmus Andersen =

Danish sculptor (1861–1930)

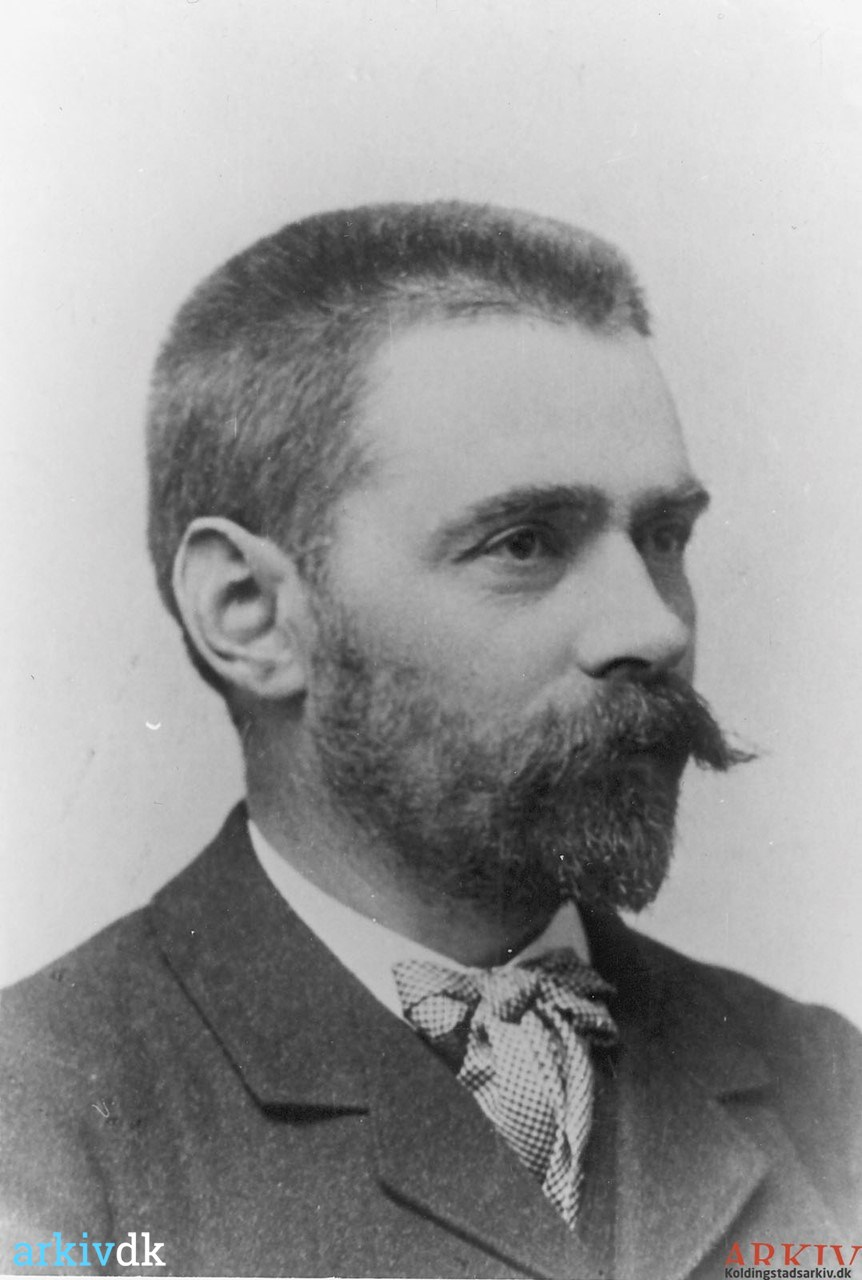
- Rasmus Morten Andersen (c. 1900)
- Born: Rasmus Morten Andersen; 25 September 1861; Ørting, Denmark
- Died: 28 February 1930 (aged 68); Frederiksberg, Denmark
- Resting place: Solbjerg Park Cemetery
- Awards: Eckersberg Medal (1900); Order of the Dannebrog (1917) Danish Medal of Merit (1918)

Rasmus Morten Andersen (25 September 1861 – 28 February 1930) was a Danish portrait sculptor, primarily of busts, statues, and cast reliefs. He is best known for his naturalistic portraits of famous Danish men of his time.

Andersen attended the Royal Danish Academy of Fine Arts from 1877 to 1884 and trained to become a sculptor at Wilhelm Bissen's studio, who influenced his style. Following his debut as an independent artist in 1882, Andersen's work was consistently exhibited in Denmark during his lifetime. He was awarded the Eckersberg Medal, the Danish Medal of Merit, and made a member of the Order of the Dannebrog.

== Career ==
Andersen initially trained as a wood carver, and was an apprentice to C.A. Blichfeldt and A. Nielsen. He also trained with the illustrator and still life artist Oluf August Hermansen. He was first recorded at the Royal Danish Academy of Fine Arts in 1877, from which he graduated on 24 March 1884. While at the academy, he worked in Vilhelm Bissen's workshop where he carved marble and sculpted. Andersen's artistic commitment to realistically representing his subjects is attributed to Bissen's influence. He also was employed in the workshops of artists Theobald Stein and Christian Carl Peters.

Andersen had his debut at the Charlottenborg Spring Exhibition in 1882. He won the Academy's small gold medal for the relief Eumaios in 1884. In 1886, he traveled in Germany. Over the winter of 1889–1890 he traveled through Southern Europe, spending particular time in France and Italy.

He participated in the World's Columbian Exposition in 1893 as well as a number of major Danish exhibitions. Throughout his career, he specialized in portraits, both in the form of statues, busts and medallions. His statue of Enrico Dalgas was awarded the Eckersberg Medal in 1900 and a bronze cast of it was erected in Aarhus in 1901.

Andersen worked as a conservator at the Art Academy's cast collection until 1905 and at Thorvaldsens Museum from 1893 until his death. He was also a member of the Charlottenborg Spring Exhibition's committee from 1914–1917.

== Personal life ==
Rasmus Andersen was born in Ørting, Denmark on 25 September 1861. His parents were Johanne Mortensen and carpenter Niels Andersen.

Andersen married Karen Sofie Nielsen (1864–1929) on 2 November 1888 in Mygind. The couple had three daughters: Gerda Andersen, Valborg Andersen, and Karen Margrethe Andersen. He died at Frederiksberg and was buried in Solbjerg Park Cemetery.

== Selected works ==
During his lifetime, his works were exhibited at the Charlottenborg Spring Exhibition, the Nordisk Kunstudstilling, the World's Columbian Exposition, the 1901 Exhibition at Copenhagen City Hall, and the Danish National Exhibition of 1909. His work was posthumously shown shortly after his death at the Kunstnerforeningen of 18 November. Andersen's notable works include:

=== Busts ===
- Hans Krüger (1884, Ribe)
- Theobald Stein (1890, bronze for Frederiksborg Museum, marble 1903 for Ny Carlsberg Glyptotek)
- H. A. Brendekilde (plaster 1901, Fyns Kunstmuseum)
- Frederik VIII (marble 1908, Frederiksborg Museum)
- Wilhelm Wiehe (marble 1924, Royal Danish Theatre; original model at the Theatre Museum in the Court Theatre)
- Christian X (DFDS.)
- Hendrik Pontoppidan (1903, Aarhus)
- Christen Thomsen Barfoed (Landbohøjskole)
- Harald Viggo Stockfleth (Landbohøjskole)
- Emil Rostrup (Landbohøjskole)
- Anton Marius Theodor Westermann (Landbohøjskole)
- Otto Vaupell (Kolding Slotsbanke)
- Wilhelm Johannsen (Botanisk Laboratorium)
- Christen Berg (Bogø)
- Ludvig Schrøder

=== Reliefs ===
- Otto Vaupell (Kolding, 1900)
- J.P. Michelsen (Herning)
- Sigurd Berg (Skjern, 1923)

=== Statues ===
- Hans Christian Andersen, Chicago (1889)
- E.V. Dalgas, Aarhus (1901, executed 1900)
- J.C. la Cour, Lyngby (1903)
- L. Brockenhuus-Schack, Svendborg (1904)
- Carl Frederik Tietgen, Sankt Annæ Plads, Copenhagen (1905 at Børsen)
- Chresten Berg, Kolding (1906)
- Christian IX, Nykøbing Mors, (1909)
- Lensbaron Zytphen-Adeler, Faarevejle (1928)

== Gallery ==
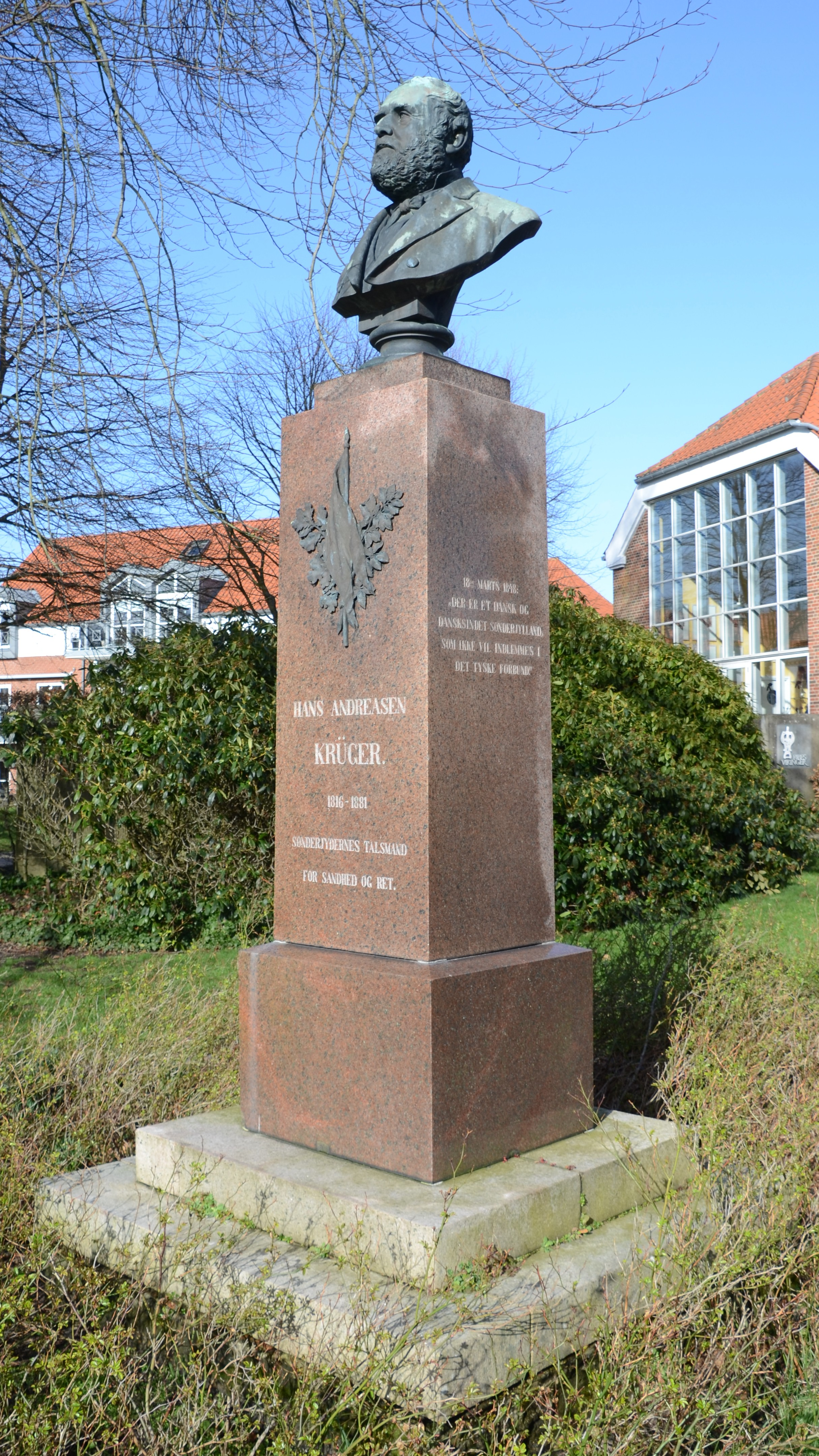
Bust of Hans Andreasen Krüger (1884) in Ribe

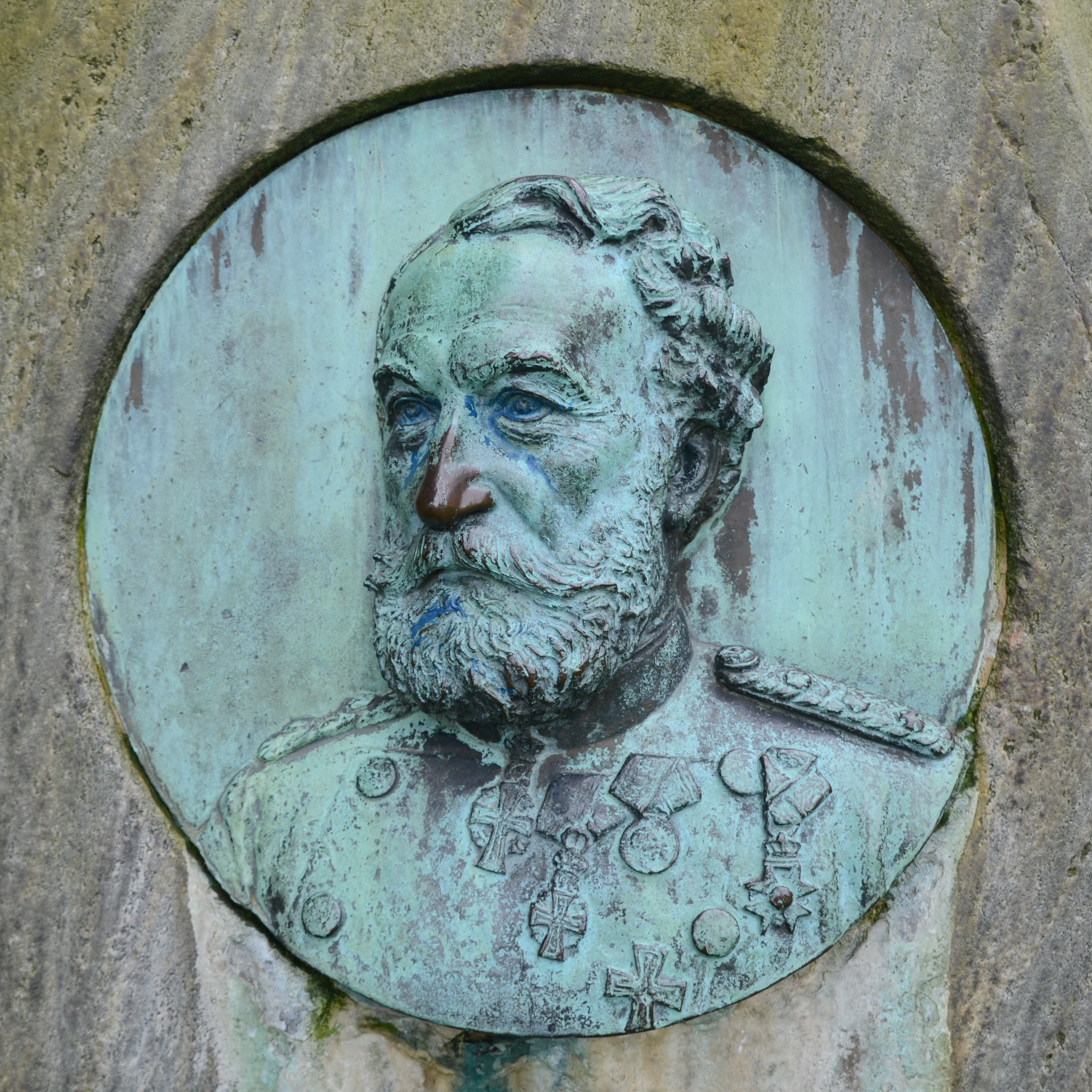
Relief of Otto Vaupell (1900) near Koldinghus

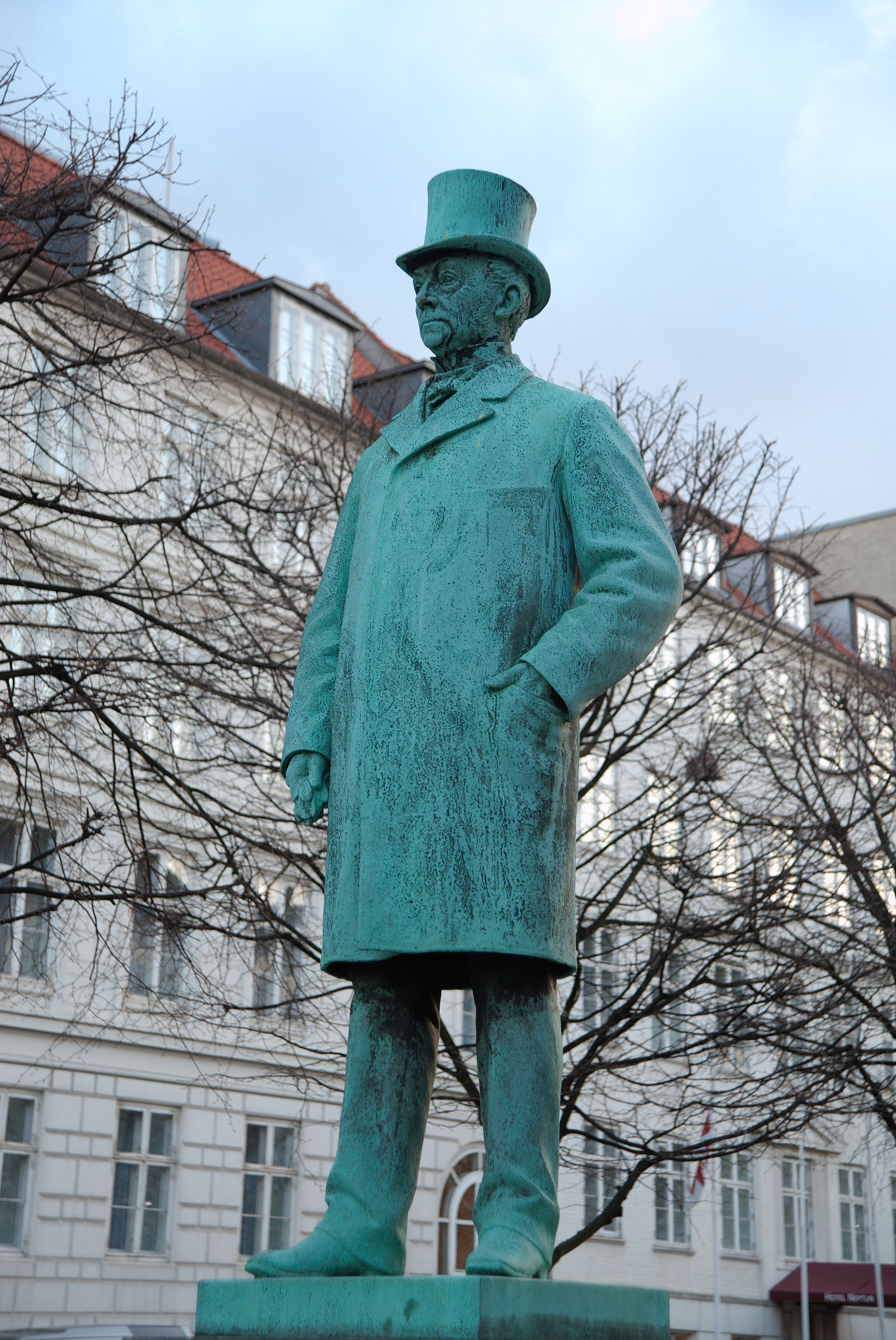
Statue of Carl Frederik Tietgen (1905) at Sankt Annæ Plads in Copenhagen

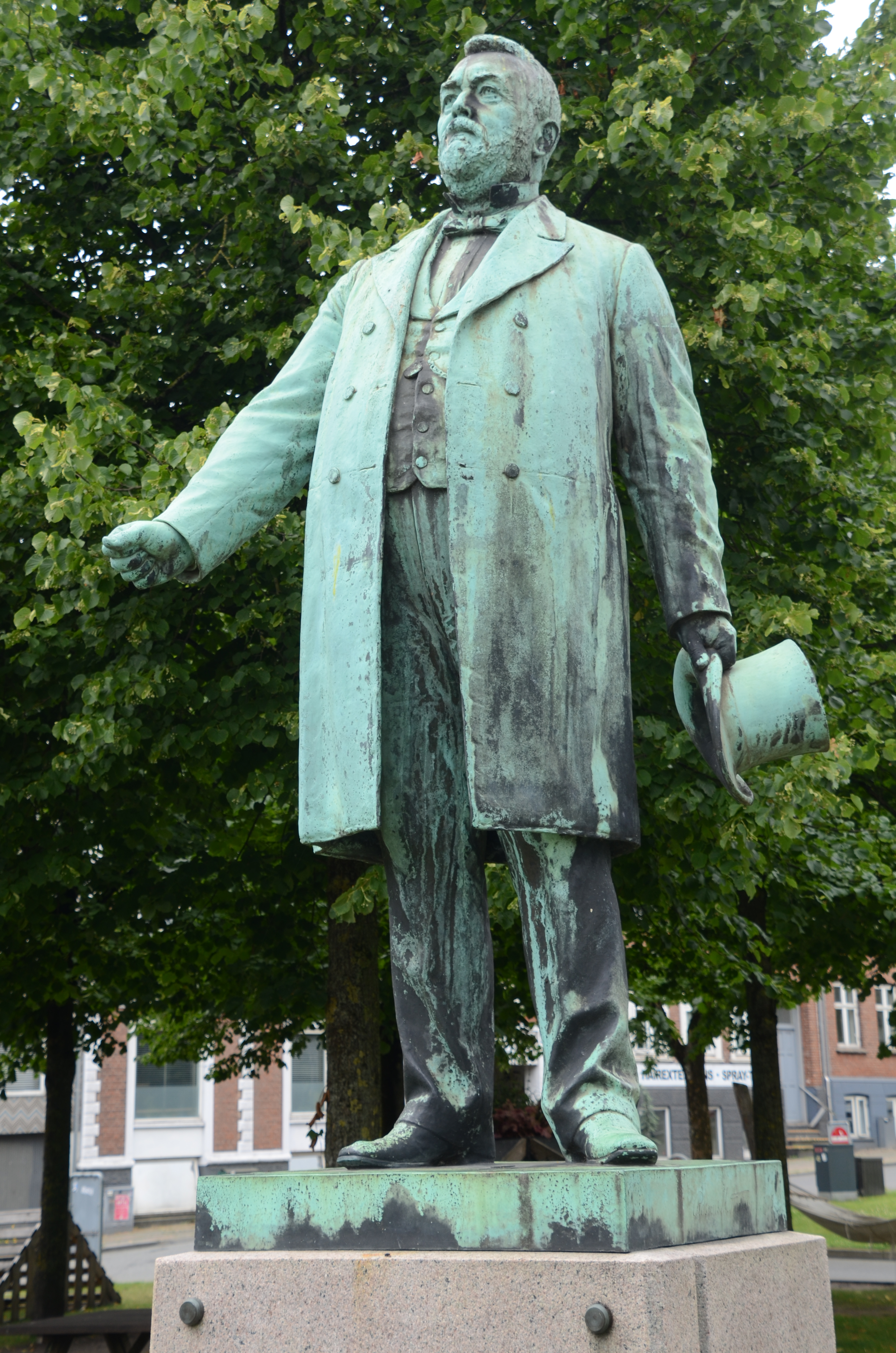
Statue of Christen Berg (1906) in Kolding
