= Jens Lind (botanist) =

Danish botanist (1874–1939)

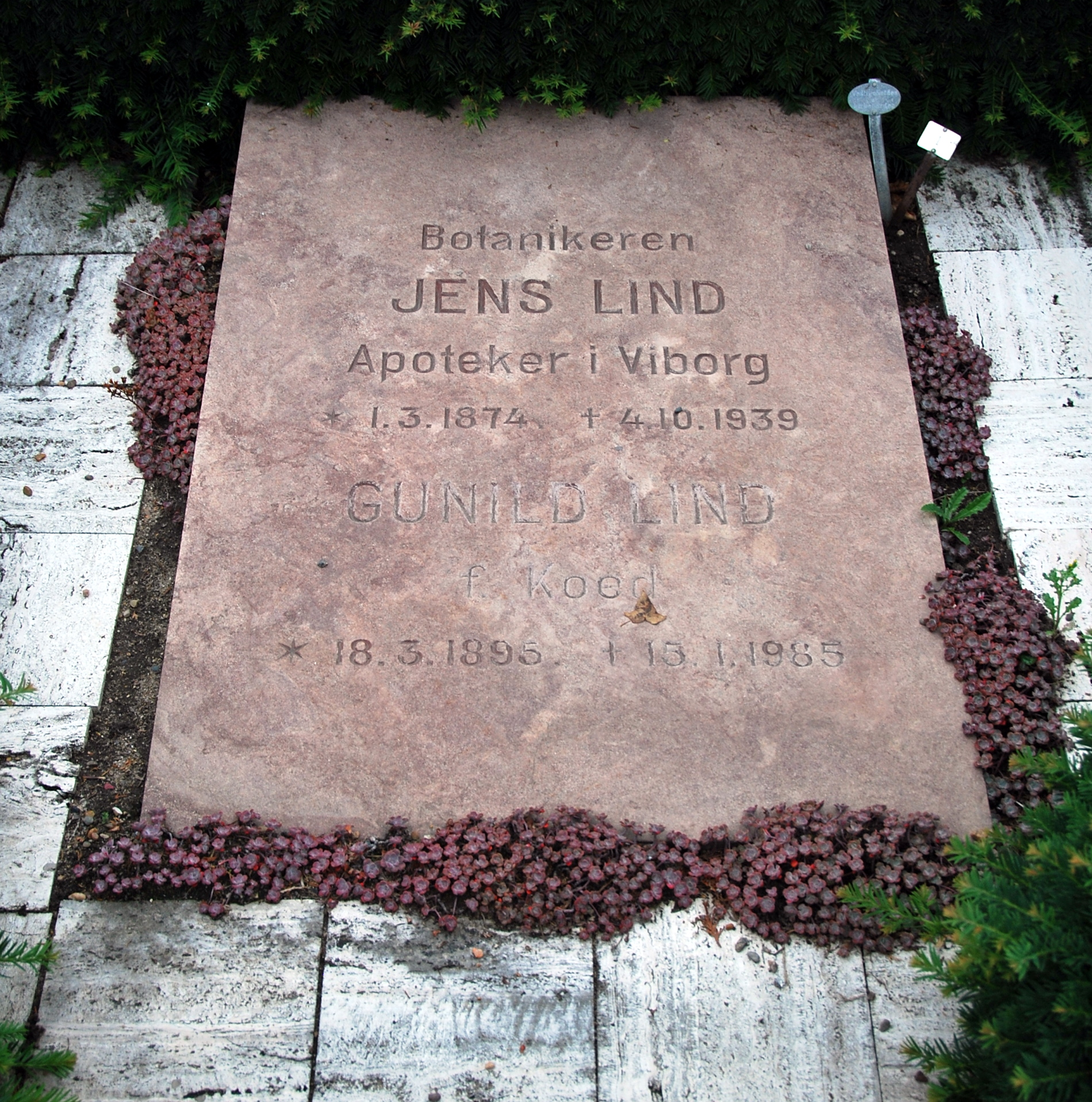
Gravestone of Jens Lind and wife Gunild, placed at Viborg Cemetery (Photo: Lars Schmidt).

Jens Wilhelm August Lind (1 March 1874 in Nykøbing Mors – 4 October 1939 in Viborg) was a Danish apothecary, botanist and mycologist. He was a pupil of Emil Rostrup and published a full account of all fungi collected in Denmark by Rostrup. These were mainly microfungi, such as plant pathogens. He also wrote accounts on microfungi from Greenland and elsewhere, mainly based on collections made by other persons on expeditions, e.g. Gjøa expedition and the Second Thule Expedition. Combining his pharmaceutical and mycological knowledge, he was early in experimenting on chemical control of plant pathogens and recommending it to other practitioners. He also - together with Knud Jessen - wrote an account on the immigration history of weeds to Denmark.

Example of a species named by Lind: Triposporium myrti, now known as Tripospermum myrti (Capnodiaceae).

== See also ==
- Knud Jessen
- Knud Rasmussen
