= Knud Jessen =

Danish botanist and quaternary geologist

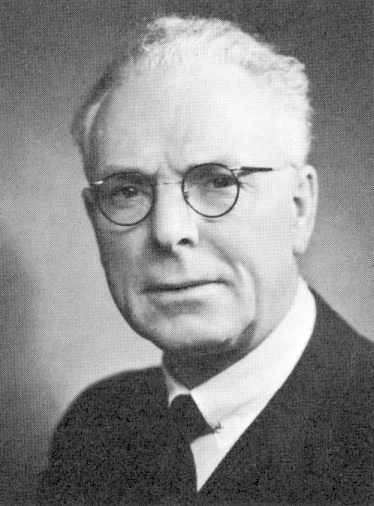
Knud Jessen

Knud Jessen (29 November 1884 – 14 April 1971) was a Danish botanist and quaternary geologist.

== Biography ==
Jessen was born at Frederiksberg, Denmark. He was a student at the University of Copenhagen and was awarded cand.mag. in natural history and geography with botany as a major in 1911.

He was state geologist 1917–1931. In 1931, he succeeded C.H. Ostenfeld as professor of botany at the University of Copenhagen and director of the Copenhagen Botanical Garden, a position he held until his retirement in 1955. His scientific works mainly concern vegetation history during the Eemian interglacial, the late glacial period of the Wisconsin glaciation and in the Holocene investigated using pollen analysis.

Jessen had come into contact with the Irish naturalist Robert Lloyd Praeger and made field-work on the quaternary geology of Ireland during 1934-1935. Together with his assistant, Frank Mitchell, he was able to describe both the post-glacial vegetation development of Ireland and that of the Eemian interglacial, with the presence in Ireland of such plants as Rhododendron ponticum, Abies alba, Erica scoparia and Buxus sempervirens.

Jessen was acknowledged by honorary doctorates at the University of Cambridge and University of Dublin. He was a member of the Royal Danish Academy of Sciences and Letters and served on the board of directors of the Carlsberg Foundation. Jessen also lived in the Botanical Gardens in his later life. He became a Knight in the Order of the Dannebrog in 1936 and Commander 2nd degree in 1949.

== Personal life ==
Jessen married Ingrid Holm (1884-1984) and had four children, including Poul Holm Jessen, a chemist who founded and ran the plastics company Scandiflex.

== Selected scientific works ==
- Jessen, K. (1920) Moseundersøgelser i det nordøstlige Sjælland. Med Bemærkninger om Træers og Buskes Indvandring og Vegetationens Historie (Bog investigations in Northeast Zealand with notes on the immigration of trees and shrubs and the development of the vegetation). Doctoral dissertation. Danmarks Geologiske Undersøgelse, II.række, 34, 1-243.
- Jessen, Knud; Lind, Jens (1922). Det danske Markukrudts Historie [History of Danish Arable Weeds]. Kongelige Danske Videnskabernes Selskabs Skrifter - Naturvidenskabelig og Mathematisk Afdeling, 8.Rk. (in Danish). Vol. 8. p. 496.
- Jessen, K. & V. Milthers (1928) Stratigraphical and palaeontological studies of interglacial fresh-water deposits in Jutland and northwest Germany. Danmarks Geologiske Undersøgelser II rk. Vol. 48: 1-379.
- Jessen, K. with the assistance of H. Jonassen (1935) The composition of the forests in northern Europe in Epipalaeolithic time. Biologiske Meddelelser, Kongelige Danske Videnskabernes Selskab 12 (1): 1-64.
- Jessen, K. (1949) Studies in Late Quaternary deposits and flora-history of Ireland. Proceedings of the Royal Irish Academy 52, sect. B, no. 6: 85-290.
