= Hendrik Pontoppidan =

Danish merchant, consul and philanthropist

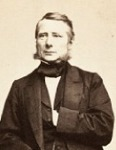
- Hendrik Pontoppidan
- Born: 21 March 1814; Thisted, Denmark
- Died: 22 February 1901 (aged 86); Hamburg, Germany

Hendrik Pontoppidan (21 March 1814 in Thisted – 22 February 1901) was a Danish merchant, consul and philanthropist. His parents were priest Børge P. Glahn and Mette Magdalene (née Glahn) but when he was three his father died and he was moved to Thisted to live with family there. Through his life Hendrik Pontoppidan worked extensively with agriculture advocacy and reform. He co-founded several organizations that helped farmers get organized.

He completed his youth studies and then moved abroad to study trade. He studied in Copenhagen, Altona and Manchester and settled in Hamburg. Here he built a large and respected trade and loan business which was connected to many Danish merchants. During the Panic of 1857 Pontoppidan received much help from his Danish connections and emerged from the crisis unscathed. Already in the 1840s the National Bank of Denmark started using him as a commissioner and in 1851 he was made Danish Consul in Hamburg. He proved an effective and impassioned proponent of Danish farmers of Danes living in Hamburg and he founded the Scandinavian Association and was the chairman of it for many years.

Pontoppidan was also very active in agriculture in Denmark where he owned several estates. He was also friends with Enrico Dalgas and active in the work of Hedeselskabet. He owned the manor Høgildgård at Herning and there he turned 1100 hectares of heath into farmland. He also owned the manor Constantinsborg at Aarhus which he turned into a well-run operation. Through various charitable donations and foundations he donated some 50.000 Danish Crowns to the Organisation of Farmer's Associations in Jutland. He also donated large sums to Hedeselskabet, Jyske Landboforeninger and Foreningen for Danmarks Fjerkræavl, which he also co-founded. In 1875, he was made commander of the Order of the Dannebrog, in 1880 he was made commander first class and in 1891, at his 50th business anniversary, he got the Medal of Merit.

Hendrik Pontoppidan died on 22 February 1901 and was buried at Ormslev Cemetery. Skanseparken in Aarhus contains a bust of Hendrik Pontoppidan by the sculptors Vilhelm Bissen and Rasmus Andersen.
