= Skanseparken =

Public park in Aarhus, Denmark

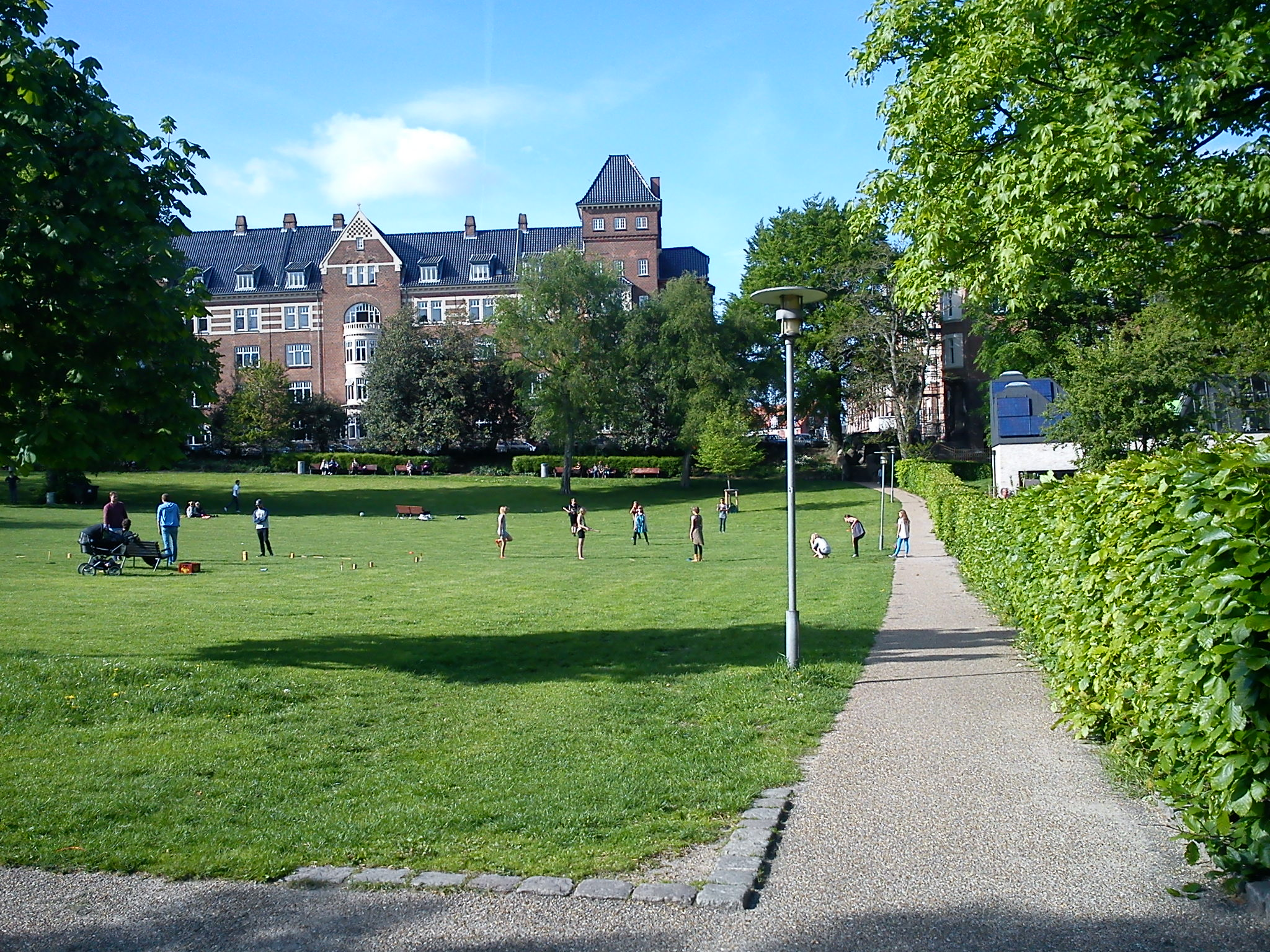
- Skanseparken with Skansepalæet (the sconce-mansion) in the background
- Interactive map of Skanseparken
- Type: Urban park
- Location: Aarhus, Denmark
- Coordinates: 56°08′44″N 10°12′25″E
- Created: 1902
- Owner: Aarhus Municipality

Skanseparken (lit. The Sconce Park) is one of the oldest parks in the city of Aarhus. It is situated in the neighborhood of Frederiksbjerg in Midtbyen. Skanseparken was constructed in the years 1901 to 1902 between the streets Strandvejen, Marselisborg Allé and Heibergsgade. The park is typical of the parks in the city with large, open areas bounded by beech trees, raised flower beds and playgrounds. It is a popular area for festivals, concerts and other cultural events.

The name of the park refers to the sconce erected by Albrecht von Wallenstein on the site when he occupied the city and used it as a base for raids throughout Jutland in 1627 during the Thirty Years' War. In 1898 the area was bought by a developer in Marselisborg and subsequently annexed by the city. Two large residential complexes known as Skansen (The Sconce) and Skansepalæet (The Sconce-mansion) overlooking the small park in the north, both refers to the former sconce here.

Skanseparken contains a bust of Hendrik Pontoppidan by the sculptors Vilhelm Bissen and Rasmus Andersen.

== Gallery ==
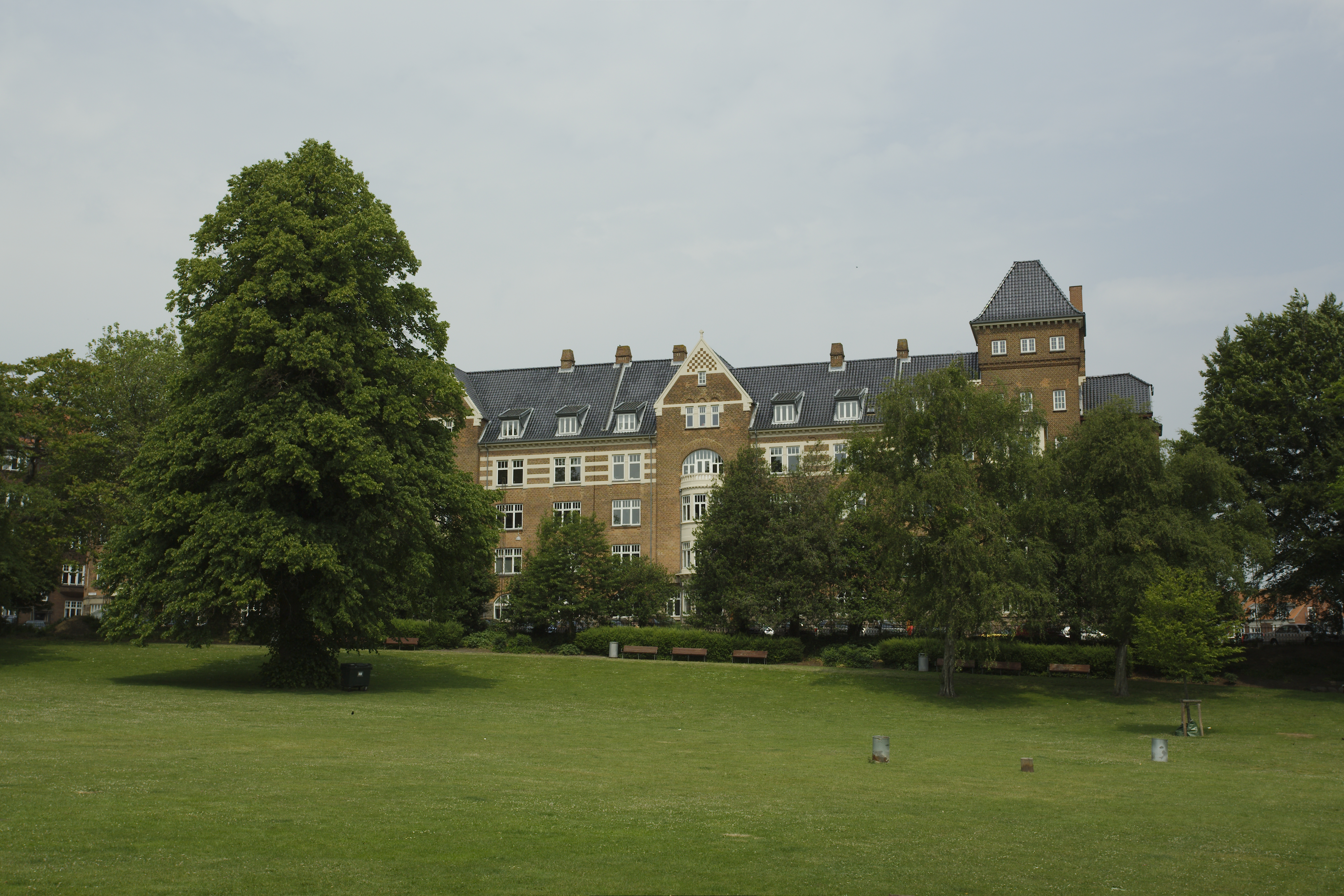

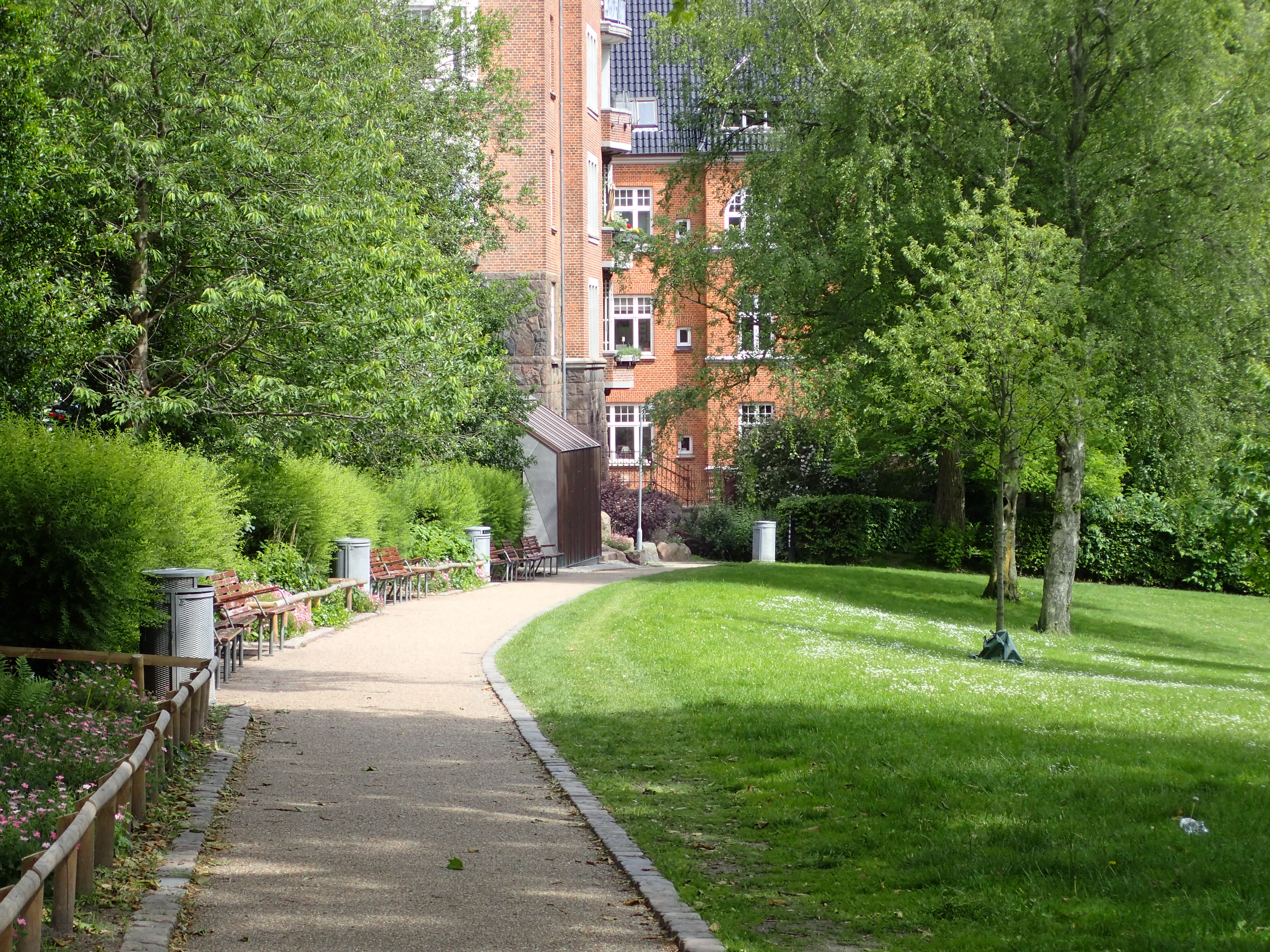

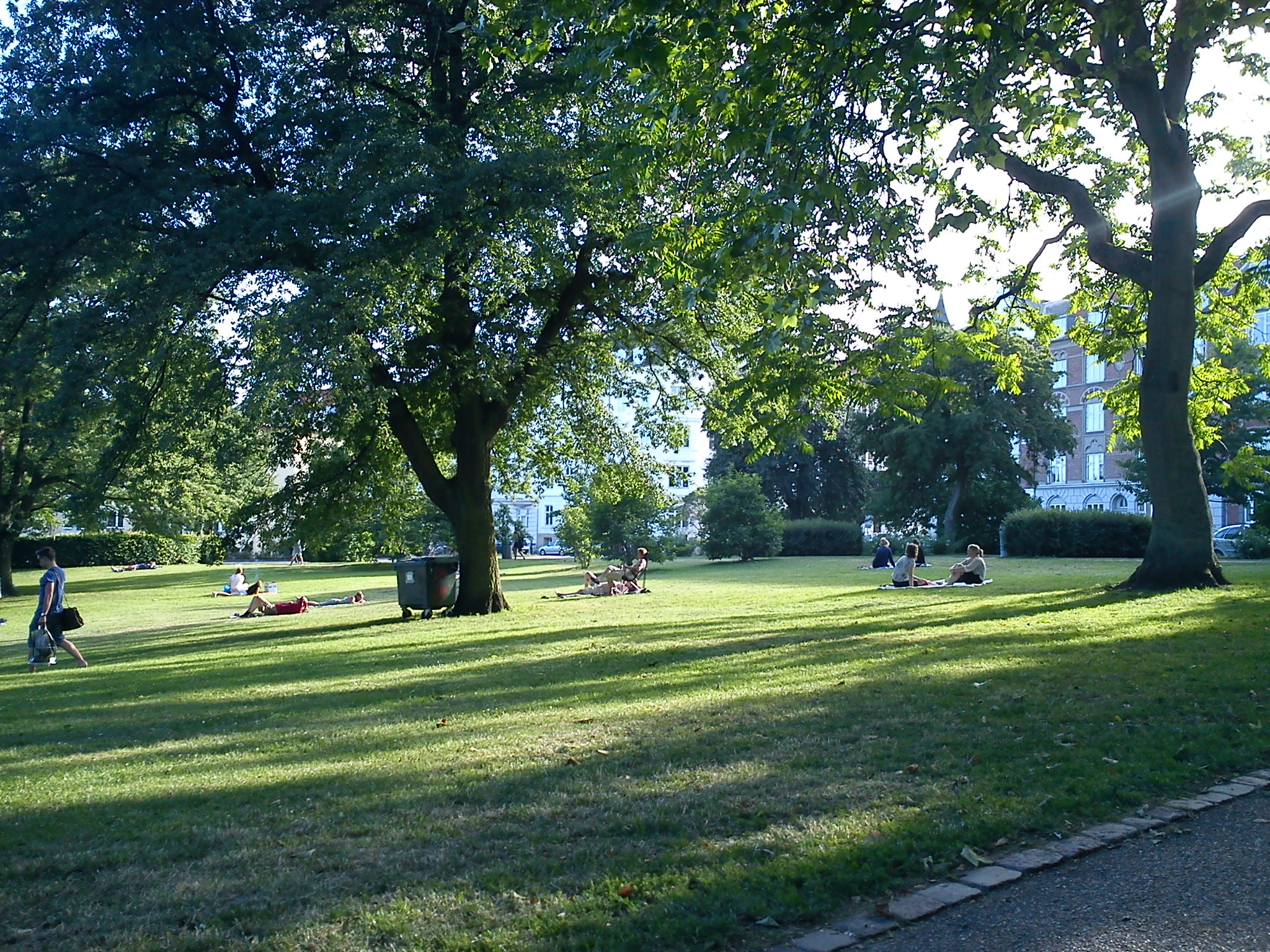

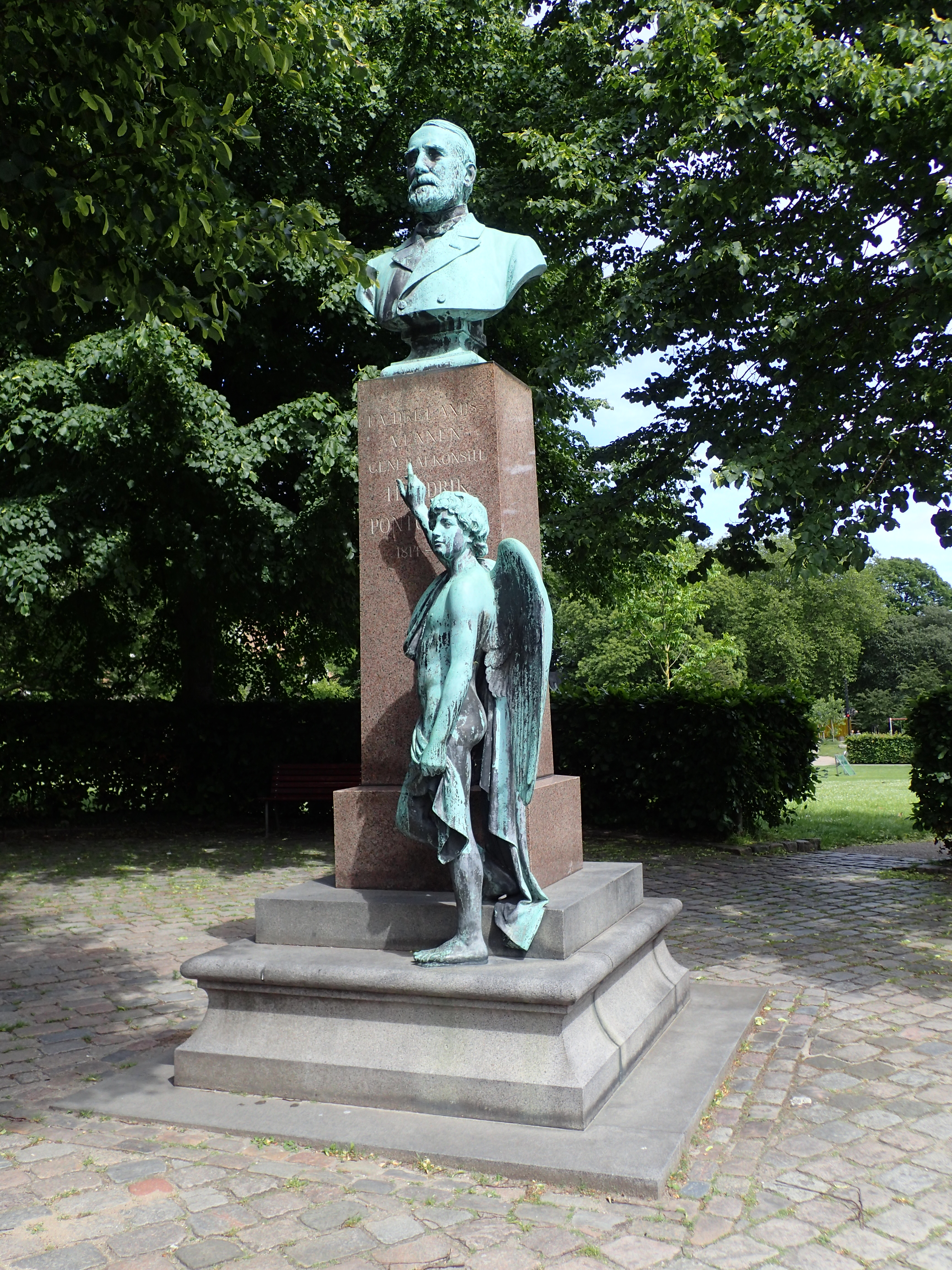
