= Hagbard Jonassen =

Danish scientist (1903–1977)

Hagbard Jonassen (24 May 1903 – 1 March 1977) was a Danish botanist, quaternary geologist, war resister and nuclear disarmament proponent. He made a lasting impact on the interpretation of pollen diagrams, including the use of modern pollen deposition in moss polsters to aid interpretation and the consideration of pollen productivity in different types of vegetation.

== Career ==
He studied natural history at the University of Copenhagen and obtained his M.Sc. (cand. mag.) in 1931. He then became an assistant to Knud Jessen, who was the professor of botany at the University of Copenhagen and director of the Copenhagen Botanical Garden and one of the pioneers of pollen analysis in quaternary geology. He assisted Jessen in his work on Irish vegetation history.

Jonassen’s list of papers is short. Nevertheless, his doctoral dissertation from 1950 had a lasting impact on its field in two respects. Jonassen pioneered the use pollen collected from moss polsters to assess the modern pollen rain and, by comparison with the species composition of surrounding vegetation, he was able to infer past vegetation from fossil pollen spectra much more accurately than before. Hence, he concluded that 1) cultivated crops such as cereals (except rye), beet, clover and lucerne had very low pollen production and the pollen signal from such areas would have a much higher detection limit than more productive types of land. Similarly, the pollen signal from un-wooded terrain like heathland and grassland could be completely swamped in pollen production from wind-pollinated trees. 2) Pollen dispersal in forest very limited local due to restricted wind speed, which was later confirmed by detailed investigations by Henrik Tauber. Jonassen’s work on the Holocene history of heathlands in Jutland showed that forest had preceded heathland. He hypothesized that climate change had led to abandonment of agriculture and heathland expansion. More recent investigations in Denmark and Norway have shown that heathland expansion was metachronous, i.e. occurring at multiple separate locations to different times, suggesting an overriding impact of humans and less of importance for climate change.

== Peace activism ==
As a young student and army conscript, he was a co-founder of the Danish branch of War Resisters' International in 1926. He served as its president 1936-1942 and again from 1964. He also co-founded the humanitarian non-governmental organisation Mellemfolkeligt Samvirke in 1944. In the 1960s, Jonassen engaged himself in the popular struggle against nuclear weapons.

== See also ==
- List of peace activists
