= Emil Rostrup =

Danish botanist, mycologist and plant pathologist

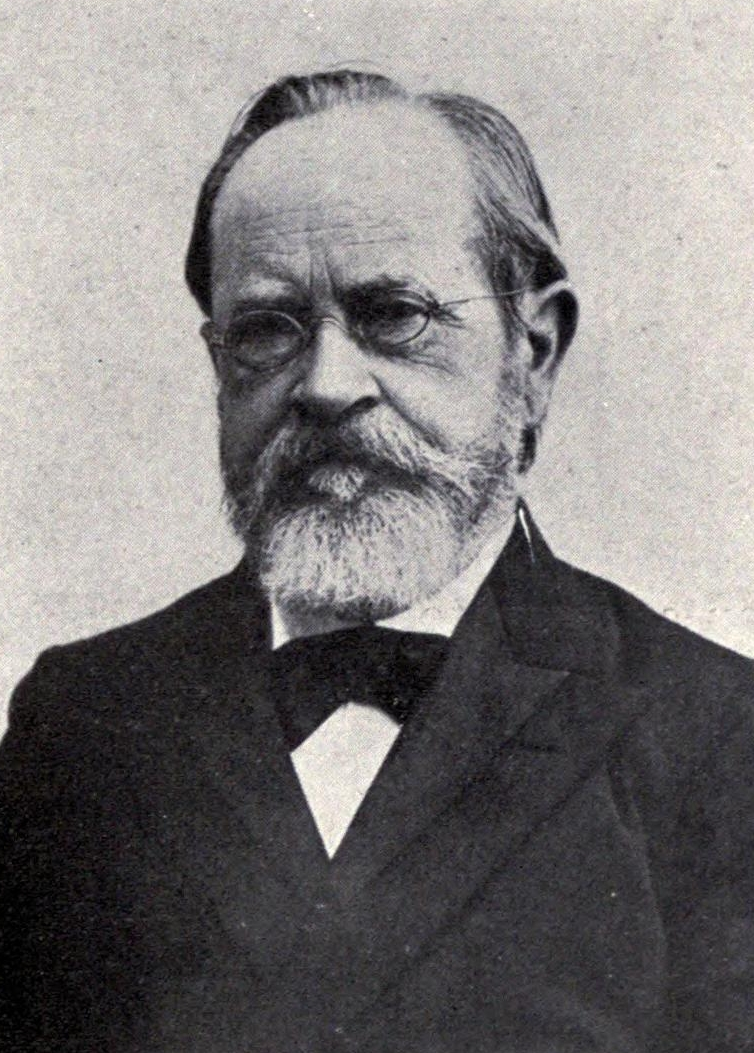

Frederik Georg Emil Rostrup (28 January 1831 – 16 January 1907) was a Danish botanist, mycologist and plant pathologist.

== Biography ==
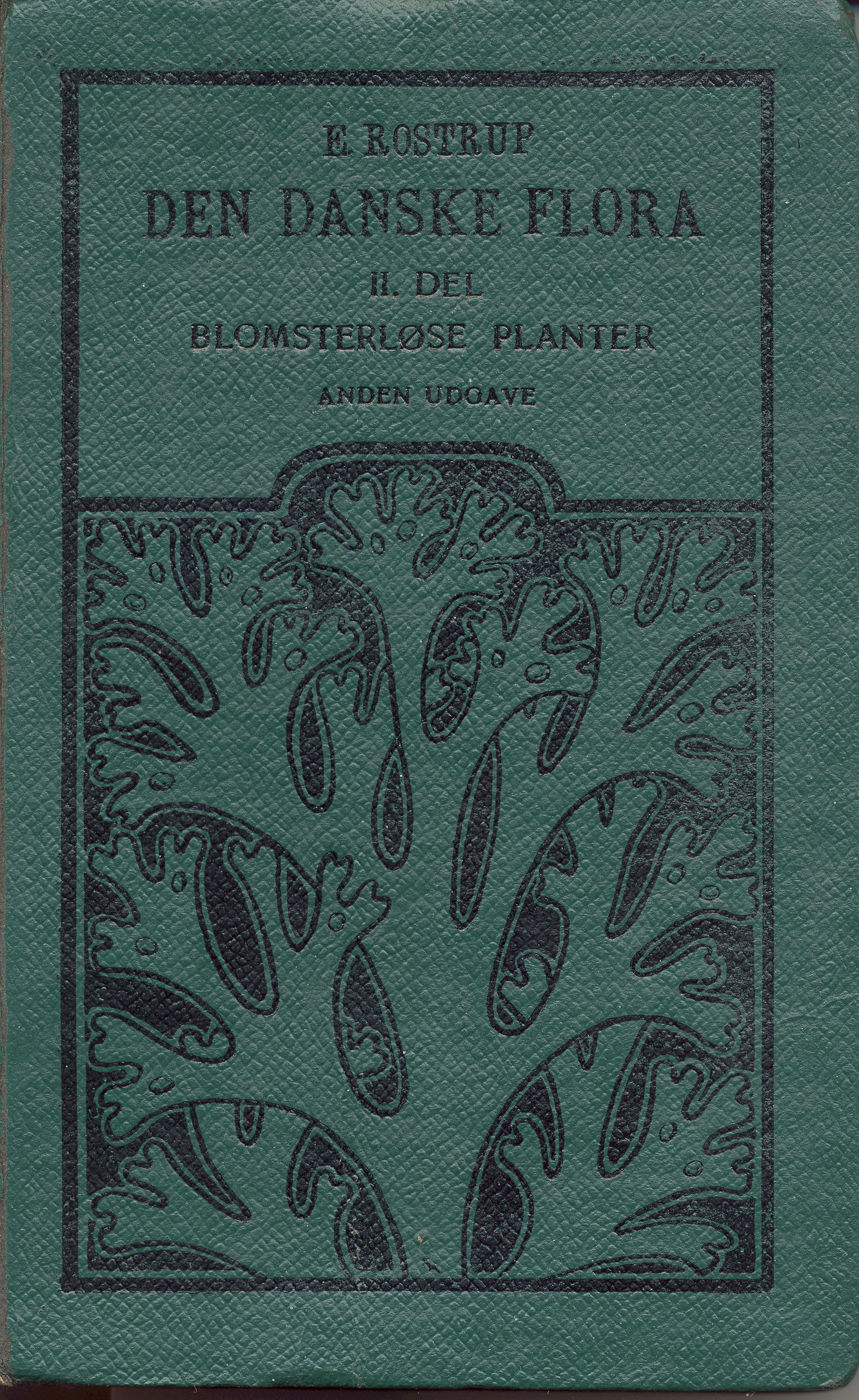
Front cover of Rostrup's Vejledning i den danske Flora II. Blomsterløse planter ("Guide to the Danish Flora - Cryptogams), 2nd edn (1925), which gives determination keys to algae, myxomycetes, fungi, lichens and bryophytes

Emil Rostrup was born at the village of Stokkemarke on the Danish island of Lolland. Rostrup completed his polyteknisk examen in 1857. From 1858, Rostrup was a teacher at the paedagogical college Skårup Seminarium in then new subject natural history. He educated to-be school teachers for 25 years. In the meantime he had become well known for his flora handbooks and his works on plant pathology. He was appointed docent at the Royal Veterinary and Agricultural University in 1883. From 1902, he was professor at the same college. Rostrup was first real plant pathologist in Denmark and probably the greatest ever. He was member of Royal Danish Academy of Sciences and Letters (from 1882), Royal Physiographic Society in Lund (from 1888), Royal Swedish Academy of Agriculture and Forestry (from 1890). In 1894, he was made honorary doctor at the University of Copenhagen.

After his death, his adept Jens Lind published a full account on all fungi collected by him in Denmark - mainly microfungi such as plant pathogens

Numerous fungal species have been named to his honour, e.g. Exobasidium rostrupii, Acanthosphaeria rostrupii, Austroboletus rostrupii and Phoma rostrupii.
