= Johan Dalgas Frisch =

Brazilian engineer and ornithologist (1930–2024)

Johan Dalgas Frisch (12 July 1930 – 22 June 2024) was a Brazilian engineer and ornithologist.

== Biography ==
Frisch was born in São Paulo on 12 July 1930, the son of Danish immigrants Svend Frisch and Ellen Margareth Dalgas Frisch, who came to reside in Brazil in 1927. His maternal grandfather was Enrico Dalgas, a famous Danish forester. From an early age, he observed local birds and their behavior, an interest encouraged by his father. Svend Frisch was an artist who among other things drew Brazilian birds, eventually including some illustrations for books he coauthored with Johan.

In 1950, Frisch enrolled in the Universidade Presbiteriana Mackenzie in São Paulo, graduating with a degree in industrial engineering in 1955. His first job was at a power line factory. In 1958, he travelled to his employer's headquarters in Scotland. He made use of this opportunity to meet European ornithologists, and was introduced to their collections of recordings of bird songs.

On returning to Brazil, Frisch started recording birds, initially using a cardboard funnel. He refined this design as he made recordings, and eventually made a parabolic dish for the same purpose. On a trip to the Pantanal, he made several recordings of the local birds.

In 1962, Johan released some of his recordings as an album on LP vinyl, Canto das Aves do Brasil (Songs of the Birds of Brazil). It was released simultaneously in Brazil, in London and in New York. For 18 consecutive weeks, his recordings of birdsong were the best-selling album in Brazil. The following year he released his second album, entitled Vozes da Amazônia (Voices of Amazonia), which contains the song of the musician wren. In 1974, he released the CD album Sinfonia do Natal with Christmas songs such as Silent Night and Jingle Bells interspersed with sounds of birds.

In 1964, he published the book Aves Brasileiras, coauthored with his father Svend. That year he started a campaign to create a national park in the Tumucumaque Mountains, which succeeded when President Artur da Costa e Silva signed a decree protecting the area (it would become Tumucumaque National Park in 2002).

Also in 1964, his son Christian was born. Frisch had a successful career as an engineer, and in 1976 designed the wastewater treatment station at São Paulo–Guarulhos International Airport. In 1981, he published the second edition of Aves Brasileiras. Around this time he was among the founders of Associação de Preservação da Vida Selvagem, a wildlife conservation organization that marks "National Day of the Bird" every 5 October. In 1992, he received the title of Honorary Citizen of Texas for having rescued and repatriated one peregrine falcon that had been banded in Texas.

In 1994, he published a book on hummingbirds coauthored with his son Christian, Jardim dos Beija-flores. In 2001, he published Os 12 Cantos do Brasil, and in 2002 his fourth book Cantos Harmoniosos da América. In 2005, he published the third edition of Aves Brasileiras, now including a section on plants that attract birds and accordingly entitled Aves Brasileiras e Plantas que as Atraem. Many drawings in the book were those were made by Svend for earlier editions, and some of the rest were by Christian.

Dalgas Frisch died on 22 June 2024, at the age of 93. He had been in poor health for several months.
