= Acanthosphaeria =

Scientific classification
- Kingdom: Fungi
- Division: Ascomycota
- Class: Sordariomycetes
- Order: Trichosphaeriales
- Family: Trichosphaeriaceae
- Genus: Acanthosphaeria; Kirschst. (1939)

Genus of fungi

Acanthosphaeria is a genus of fungi in the family Trichosphaeriaceae. The genus was circumscribed by Wilhelm Kirschstein in 1939.

== Species ==
As accepted by Species Fungorum;

- Acanthosphaeria punctillum (Rehm & Britzelm.) Kirschst. (1939)
- Acanthosphaeria rostrupii rostrupii (Berl. & Voglino) Kirschst. (1939)
