= Tripospermum acerinum =

Scientific classification
- Kingdom: Fungi
- Division: Ascomycota
- Class: Dothideomycetes
- Order: Capnodiales
- Family: Capnodiaceae
- Genus: Tripospermum
- Species: T. acerinum

Binomial name
- Tripospermum acerinum P. Syd. (1918)

Species of fungus

Tripospermum acerinum is a plant pathogen infecting mangoes.
