= Ørting =

- Village
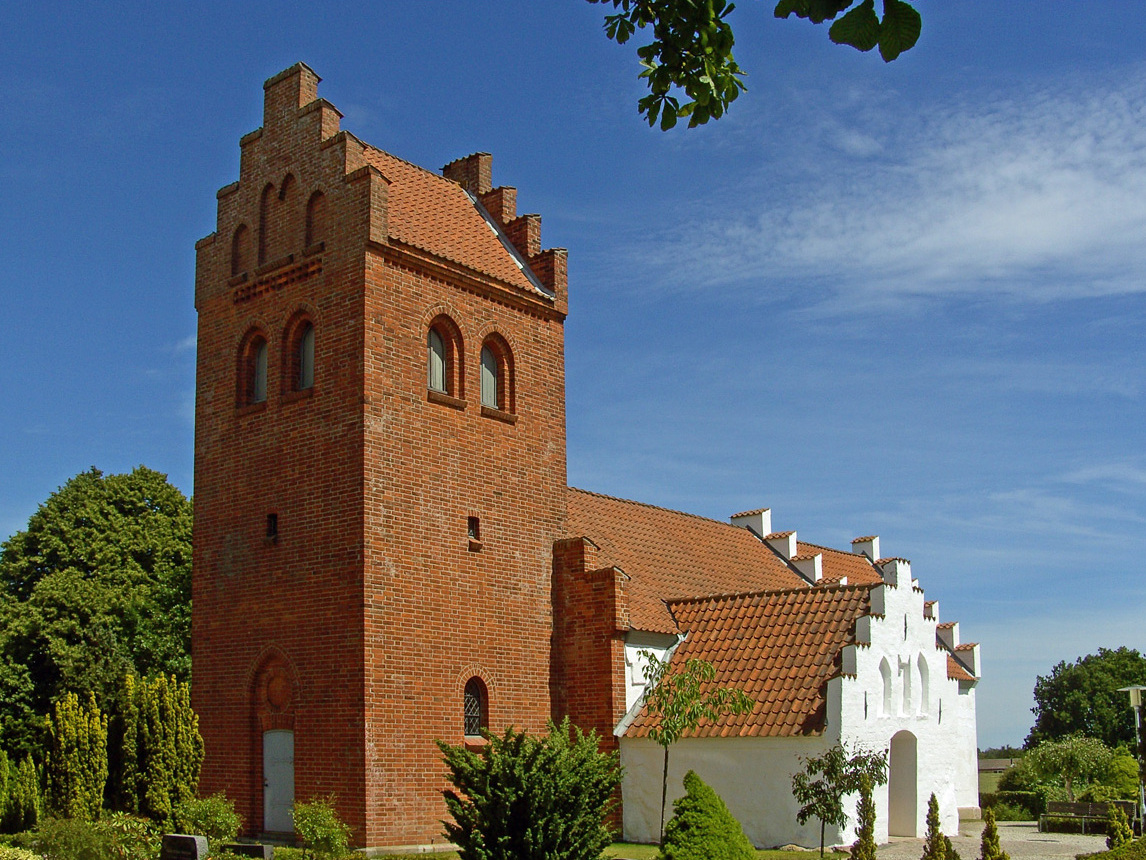
- Ørting Church

- Location in the Central Denmark Region
- Coordinates: 55°55′40″N 10°9′6″E
- Country: Denmark
- Region: Central Denmark
- Municipality: Odder

Population (2026)
  - Total: 654
- Time zone: UTC+1 (CET)
  - Summer (DST): UTC+2 (CEST)

Ørting is a village in Jutland, Denmark. It is located in Odder Municipality.

== History ==
Ørting is first mentioned in 1302 as Yrthinge.

== Notable residents ==
- Rasmus Andersen (1861 — 1930), sculptor
