= Enrico Dalgas =

Danish engineer (1828–1894)

Enrico Mylius Dalgas
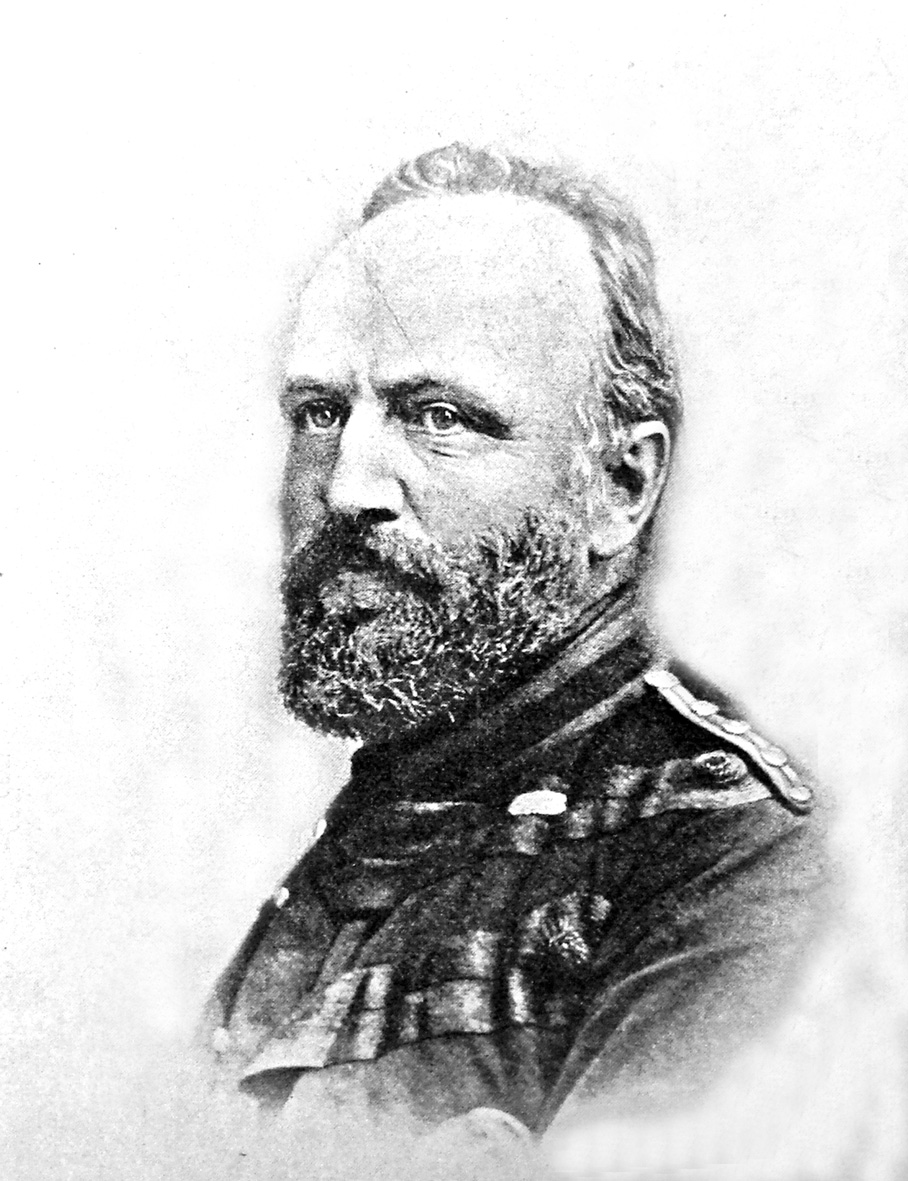
- Born: 16 July 1828 July 1828; Naples
- Died: 16 April 1894 (aged 65)
- Organization: Danish Heath Society (Hedeselskabet)
- Known for: Soil melioration
- Spouse: Marie Magdalene Christiane Købke
- Children: Christian Dalgas Frederick Dalgas Ernesto Dalgas
- Parents: Jean Antoine (father); Johanne Tomine née Stibolt (mother)

Enrico Mylius Dalgas K.^{1} D.M. F.M.I (16 July 1828 – 16 April 1894) was a Danish engineer who pioneered the soil melioration of Jutland.

== Early life and family ==
Dalgas was born on 16 July 1828 in Naples, where his father Jean Antoine was the Danish consul. He was baptised Heinrich D. Dalgas. His mother Johanne Tomine née Stibolt was the daughter of a Danish naval officer from a distinguished family. Jean Antoine was descended from Huguenots who settled in Switzerland after the edict of Fontainebleau, whence his grandfather Antoine settled in Denmark. His brother, Carlo Dalgas, was a noted animal artist. When he was 7, his father died and his mother brought him back to Denmark.

== Career ==
Dalgas joined the Danish Army as an officer of the Engineer Corps (today the Ingeniørregimentet). He mostly served as a highway engineer, reaching the rank of Lieutenant Colonel before he moved to the newly established civilian body of the Highway Authority. He also served as a pioneer officer during the First and Second Schleswig Wars, during which two of his brothers died.

== Soil melioration and related work ==
Dalgas applied the knowledge and skills he gained as a military engineer toward the reclamation and afforestation of western Jutland. After Denmark's defeat in the Schleswig wars and the ensuing loss of territory, the removal of hardpan was considered a national priority. Working on roads across Jutland gave him an intimate knowledge of the different soils present in Denmark, and the organisational skill he gained as a military officer and civil servant helped him manage large planting and forestry projects. As he performed assessments of road damage, he got to know locals and learn about their concerns, gaining knowledge as well as many allies who helped him in his endeavours. Dalgas was among the leading forces behind the planting of heaths, for while they had been cultivated before, their widespread planting was an innovation that required much more organization.

In 1867, Dalgas founded the Danish Heath Society (Hedeselskabet), with jurist Georg Morville and prominent Jutish landowner Ferdinand Mourier-Petersen. It later added a branch in northern Germany, the Haide-Cultur-Verein. Dalgas wrote a number of books on land improvement, forestry, and the natural history of forests and heaths, as well as many pamphlets, and articles published in academic and popular periodicals on a wide range of topics, including agricultural science, mycology, and entomology. Dalgas's work was later used by German soil scientist Carl Emeis (among the founders of the Haide-Cultur-Verein) as the basis for his theory on hardpan and heaths, the first work to explain the role of humic acids in soil.

== Personal life ==
In 1855 Dalgas married Marie Magdalene Christiane Købke, daughter of Lieutenant Colonel Niels Christian Købke. They had three sons: Christian Dalgas, a forester and the director of the Danish Heath Society; Frederik Dalgas, director of the Royal Porcelain Manufactory; and philosopher Ernesto Dalgas. On 16 April 1894, Dalgas died in Aarhus. They had at least one daughter, Ellen Margareth, who emigrated to Brazil and was the mother of engineer and naturalist Johan Dalgas Frisch.

== Honours ==
Enrico Dalgas was made a Knight of the Order of the Dannebrog in 1864, received the Cross of Honour of the Order of the Dannebrog in 1867, received the Medal of Merit in Gold in 1875, and was made Commander 1st Class of the Dannebrog in 1887. Dalgas Avenue in Aarhus, Dalgasgade in Herning and Dalgas Boulevard in Copenhagen are named after him, and a number of Danish cities have erected statues of him.

== Bibliography ==
- Oversigt over hederne i Jylland, 1866
- Geografiske billeder I og II, 1867–68
- Vejledning til træplantning, 1871
- Den dybe reolpløjning, 1872
- En hederejse i Hannover, 1873
- Anvisning til anlæg af småplantninger, 1875–83
- Hedemoser og Kærjorder, 1876
- Om engvandring, 1877
- Om plantning i Jylland, 1877
- Hederne og deres Kultivering, 1878
