= Aarhus N =

Coordinates: 56.183°N 10.204°E

- Postal district
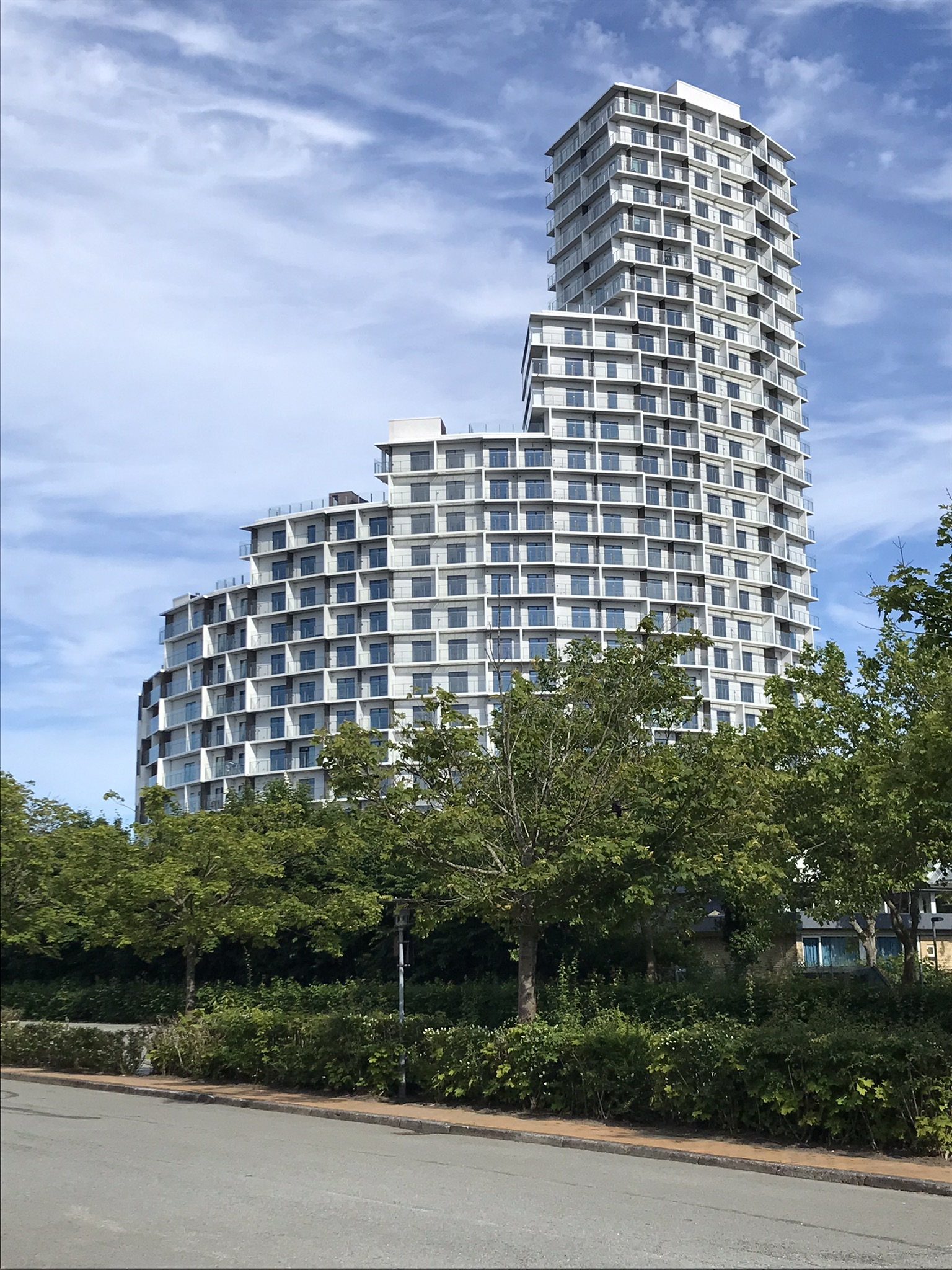
- The Archouse co-living high-rise (2023) is a new landmark for Aarhus N
- Interactive map of Aarhus N
- City: Aarhus

Population
  - Total: 34,512
- Demonyms: Aarhusianer (English: Aarhusian)
- Postal code: 8200

Aarhus N is a postal district in the city of Aarhus, consisting of Trøjborg, Risskov, Vejlby, Skejby, Vorrevangen, and Christiansbjerg; all with postal code 8200. Aarhus N is an abbreviation for Aarhus Nord (lit. "Aarhus North") and is located north of the city centre. It is the highest lying area of Aarhus.

Many of the neighborhoods in the district were once small, separated farms and villages, but developed and grew through the Industrial Revolution and later merged with the rest of Aarhus.

Aarhus N has 34,512 inhabitants (2016 statistics).

== Boroughs and neighbourhoods ==
=== Christiansbjerg ===
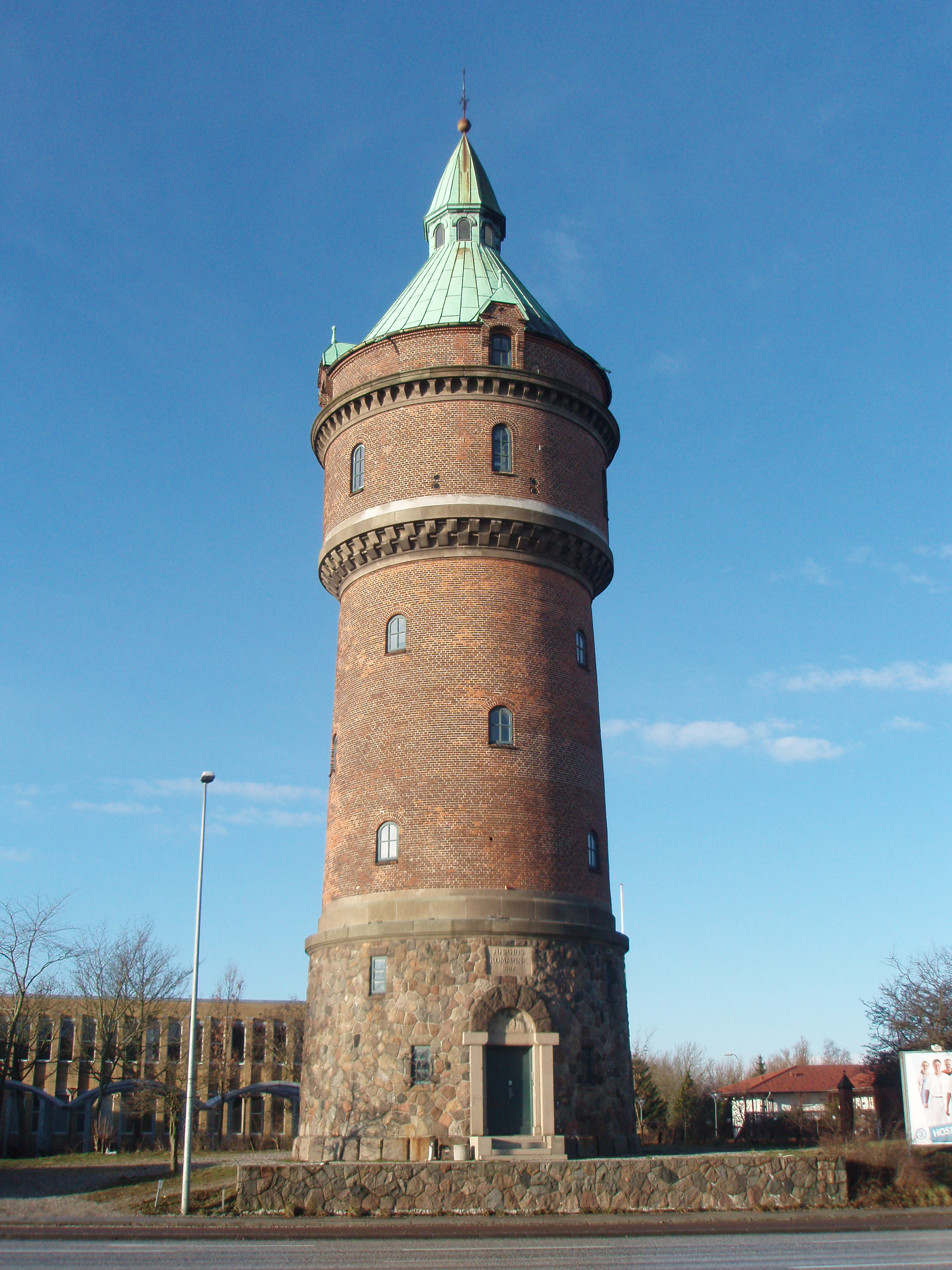
The old Randersvej Water Tower from 1907, is a landmark of Aarhus N. It was essential for supporting new settlements in this high lying region of the city.

Christiansbjerg is one of Aarhus's older boroughs, located beyond the historic city center. In the 1500-1800s, this area was covered by agricultural fields and pastures with grazing livestock. In the 1800s, several larger farms was built here and their names, such as Katrinebjerg, Reginehøj, Højvang and Vorregård, are still in use today. In the beginning of the 1900s, the development of Christianbjerg was initiated as a small independent town, but the urban constructions really first took off in the 1930s and 1940s, when a lot of new houses and apartments were erected. Now several urban squares has given the borough its own structure and identity, with an urban center on Stjernepladsen (lit.: the star square) and many shops and small businesses. In recent decades large institutions and storehouses have also appeared. The area has easy access to and from the harbour and the city centre of Aarhus and comprise large residential areas, educational institutions, many facilities for sports, the large shopping mall of Storcenter Nord (recently expanded), several dormitories and many student residents, just next to the University campus. Today, Christiansbjerg has around 22,000 inhabitants, and has grown to become an important part of Aarhus.

In the northernmost parts of Christiansbjerg, beyond the ring road of Ring 2 and west of Randersvej, there is a large business park comprising many educational institutions, sports facilities and businesses. Only a few residential apartment buildings are here. The business park extends well into the borough of Skejby, all the way to the old village of Skejby itself and is known as Business Park Skejby. Important facilities in the Christiansbjerg part of this area includes the DR headquarters, Aarhus Tech (center for technical VET educations), and the Aarhus Academy. The sports centre comprise Aarhus Skøjtehal (an indoor ice rink), Christiansbjerghallen (a sports hall), Idrætsdaghøjskolen IDA (a folk high school for sports) and full size outdoor association football fields.

==== Katrinebjerg ====
Katrinebjerg is a small neighbourhood within Christiansbjerg and is known for its IT center IT-city Katrinebjerg (IT-byen Katrinebjerg). Begun in 1999, it is now the largest IT centre in Denmark and both IT businesses, administration and education are represented here. Danmarks Medie- og Journalisthøjskole (Danish School of Media and Journalism, or simply DMJX) moved to Katrinebjerg in 2020 in a newly built complex.

==== Riisvangen ====
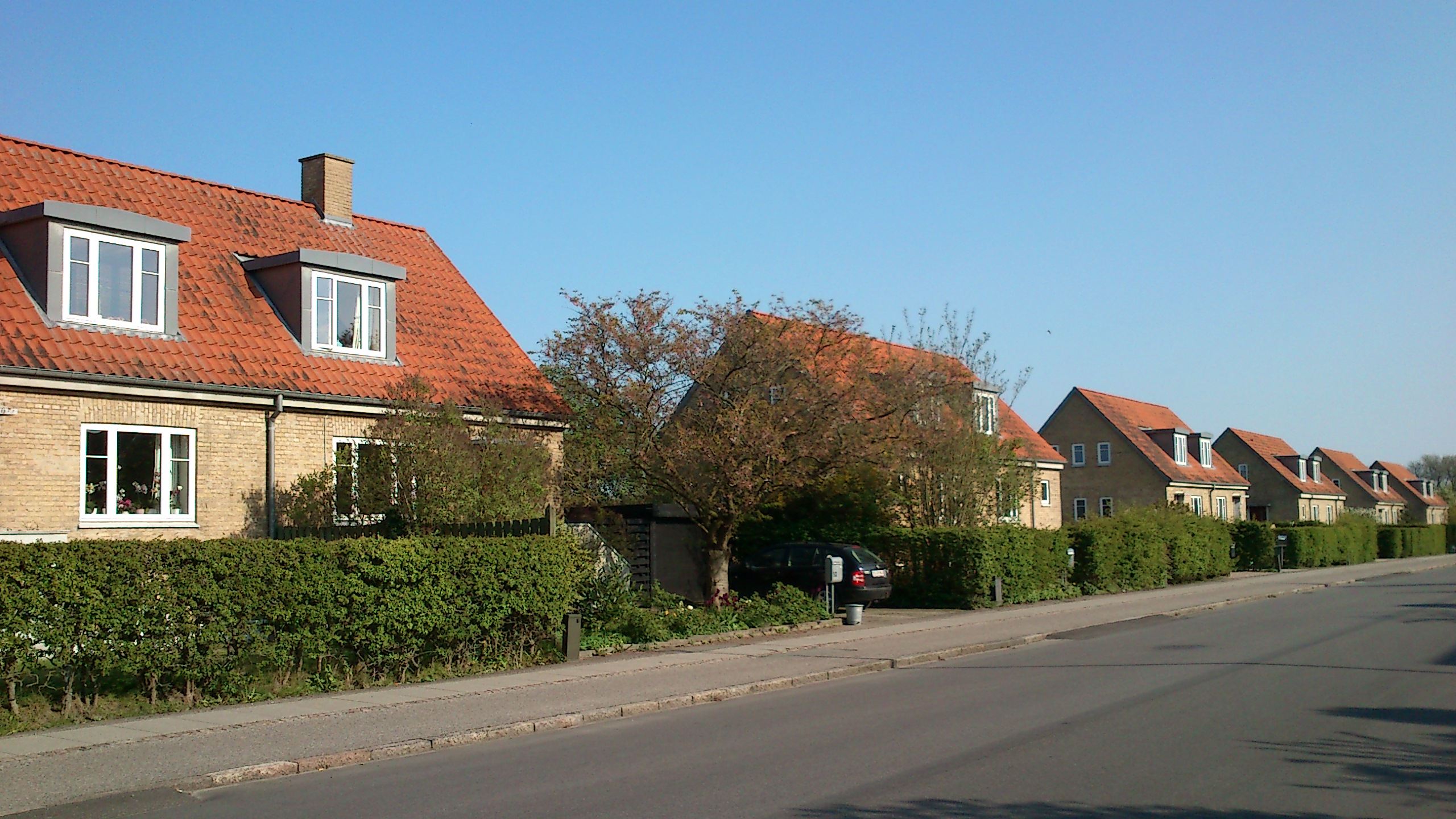
Riisvangen, rows of semi-detached two-family shared houses.

Riisvangen forms a larger residential area, comprised primarily by detached family houses. There are almost no shops, cafés or business, but the neighbourhood houses a sports club, Aarhus Fremad and their home ground, Riisvangen Stadion, next to which there are also facilities for tennis and athletics. There is also an area of allotments in the northern parts and easy access to the nature sites of Riis Skov and Vestereng.

==== Gallery (Christiansbjerg) ====
institutions

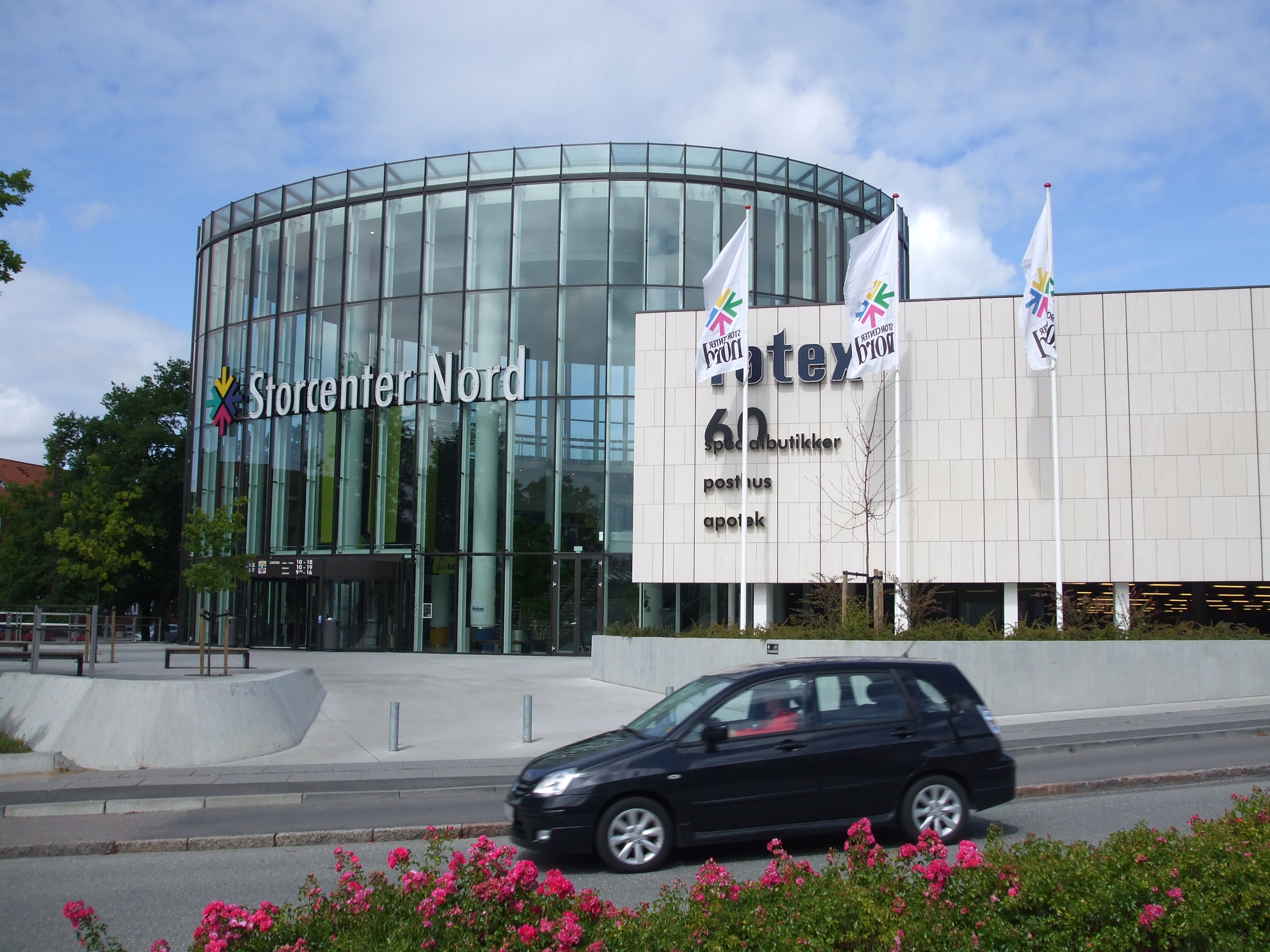
Storcenter Nord shopping mall

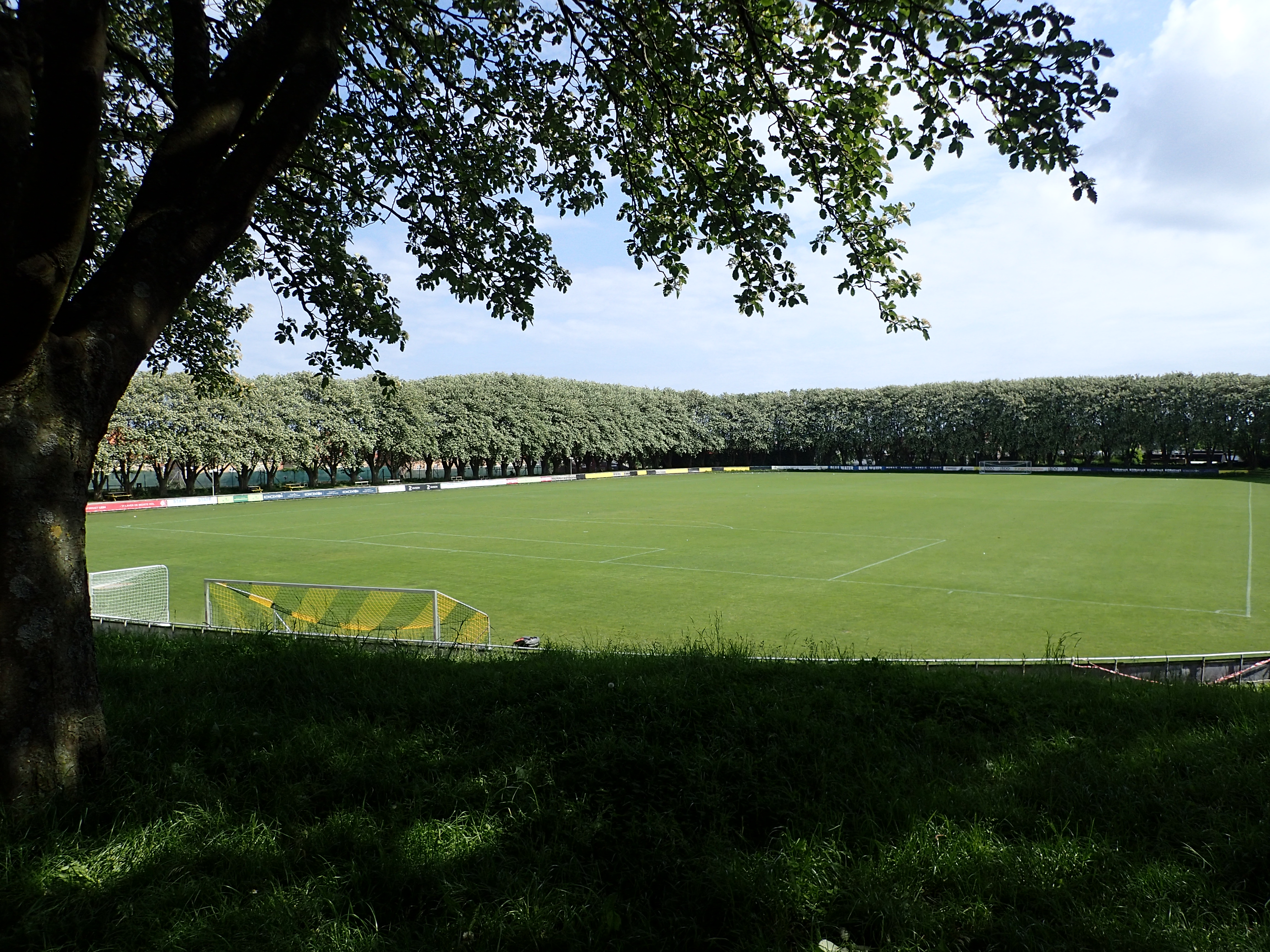
Riisvangen Stadium (1930s)

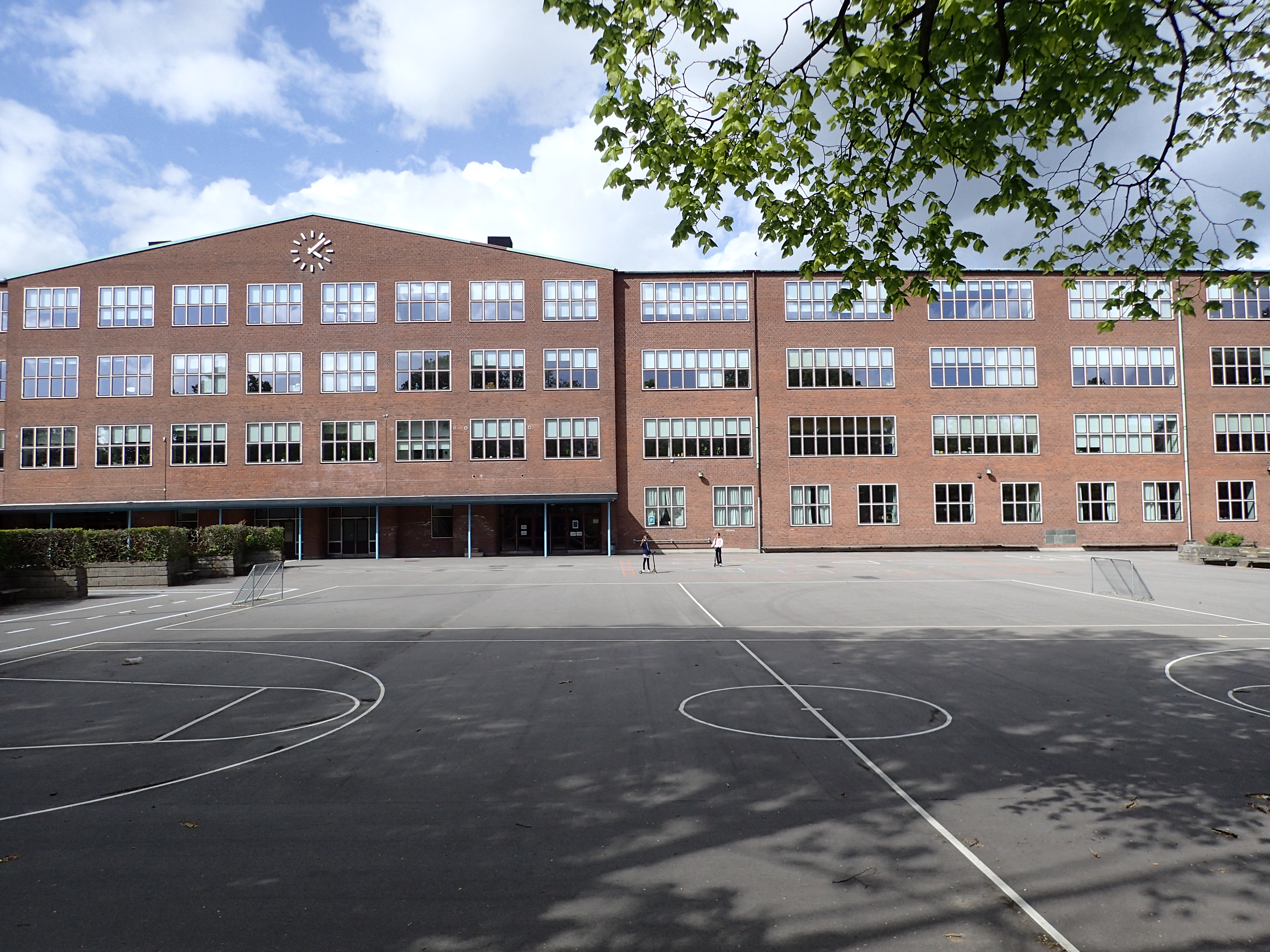
Skovangskolen public school (1937)

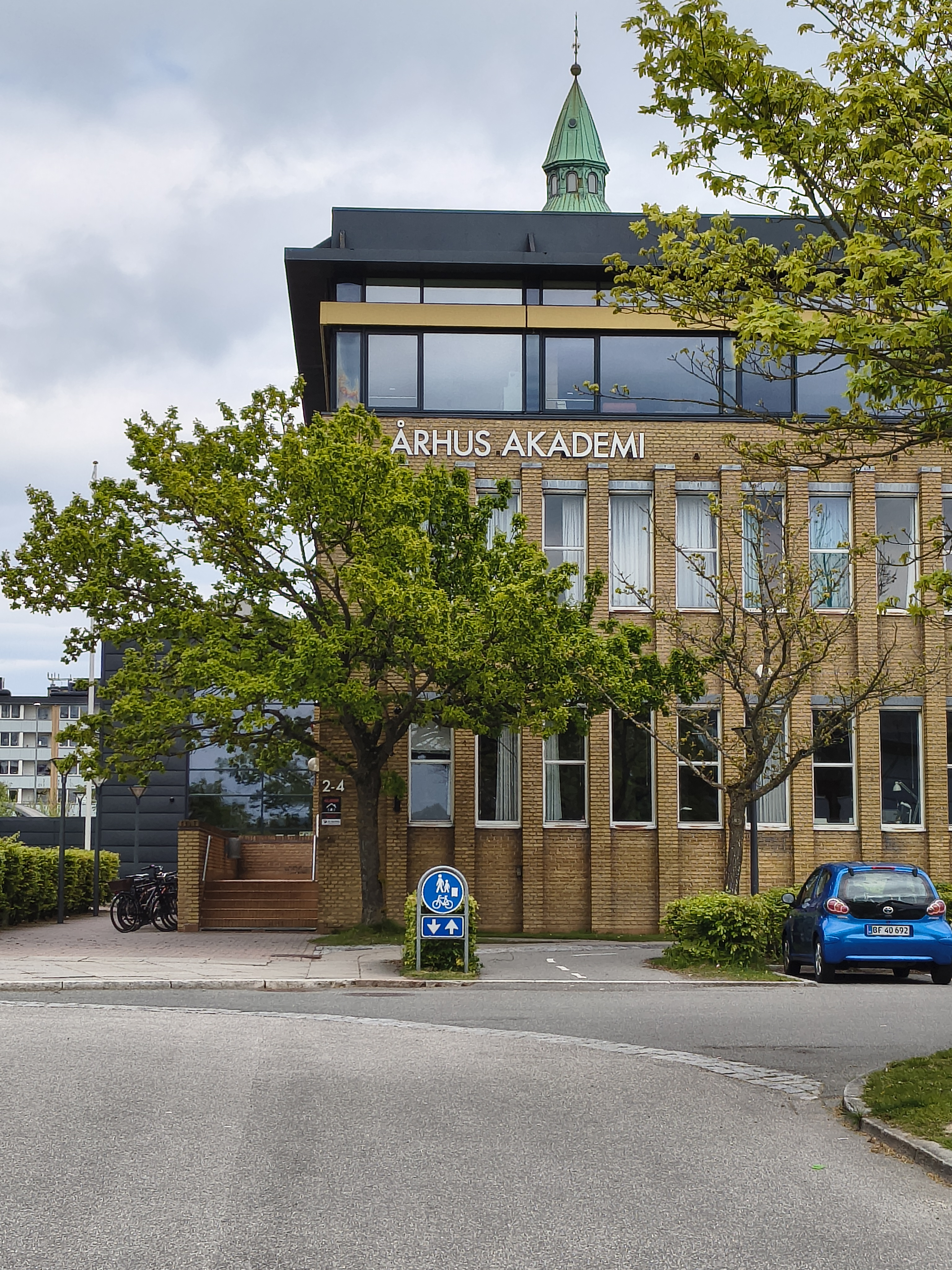
Aarhus Academy (1970)

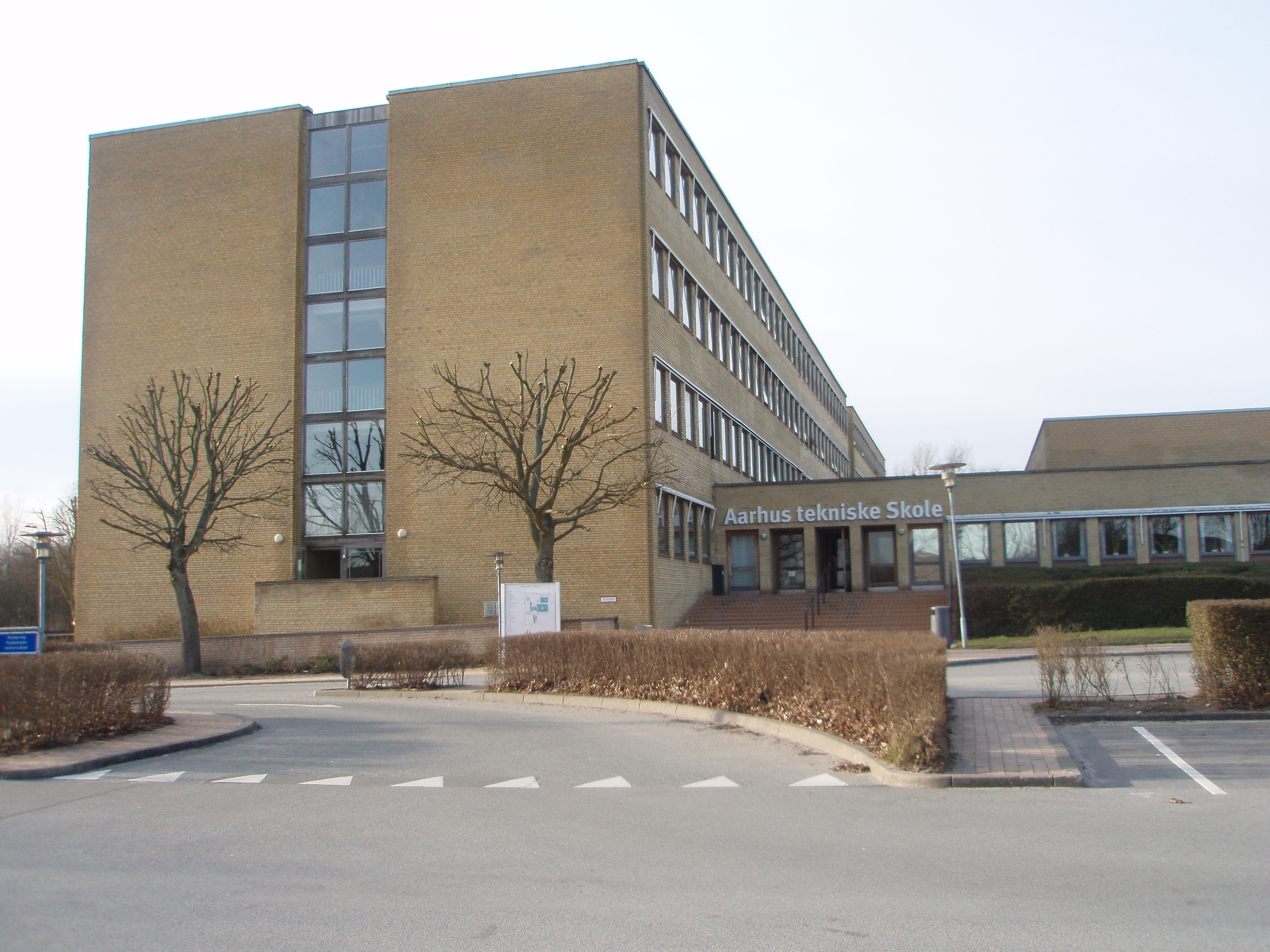
Aarhus Tech

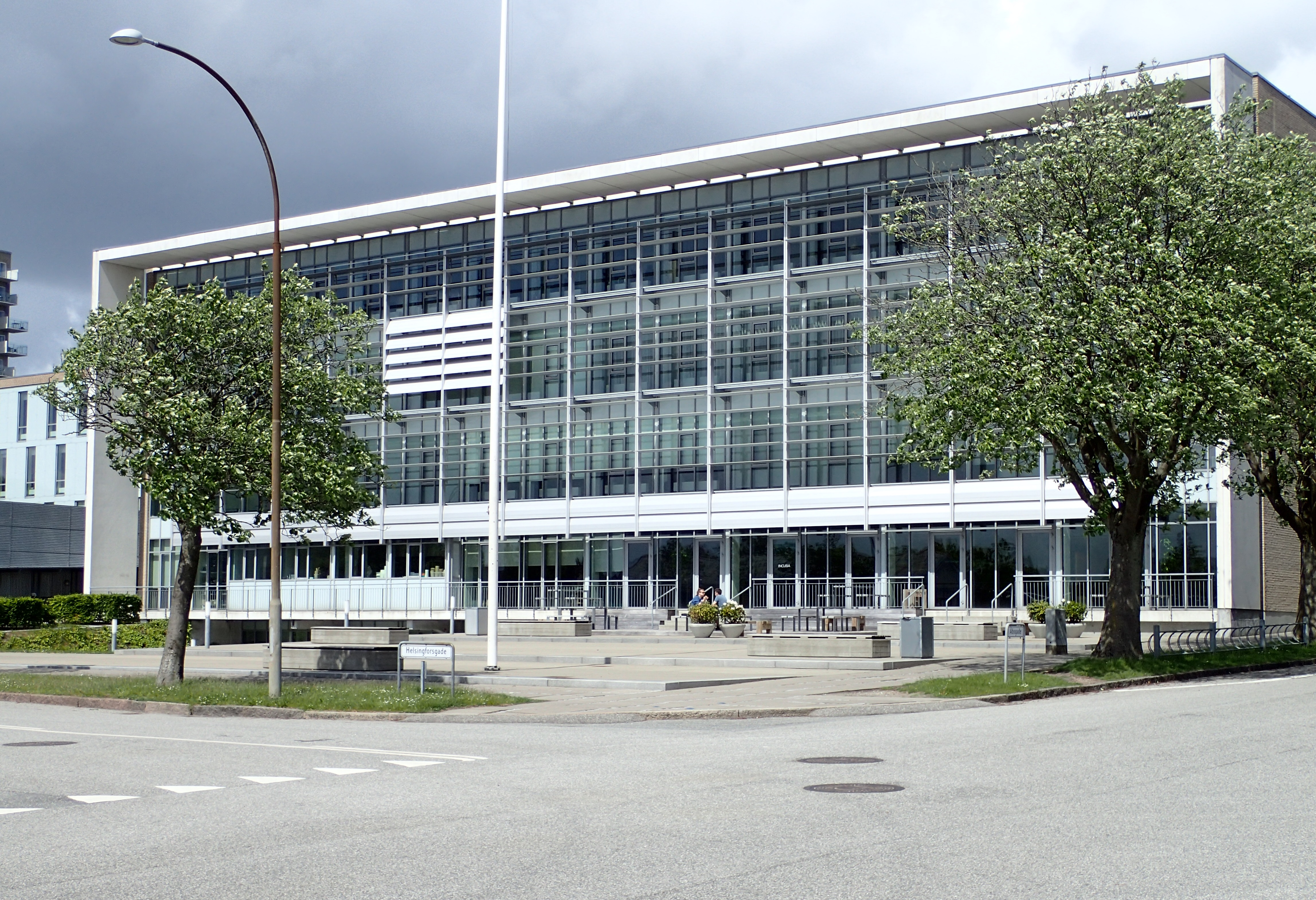
IT-Byen Katrinebjerg (INCUBA center)

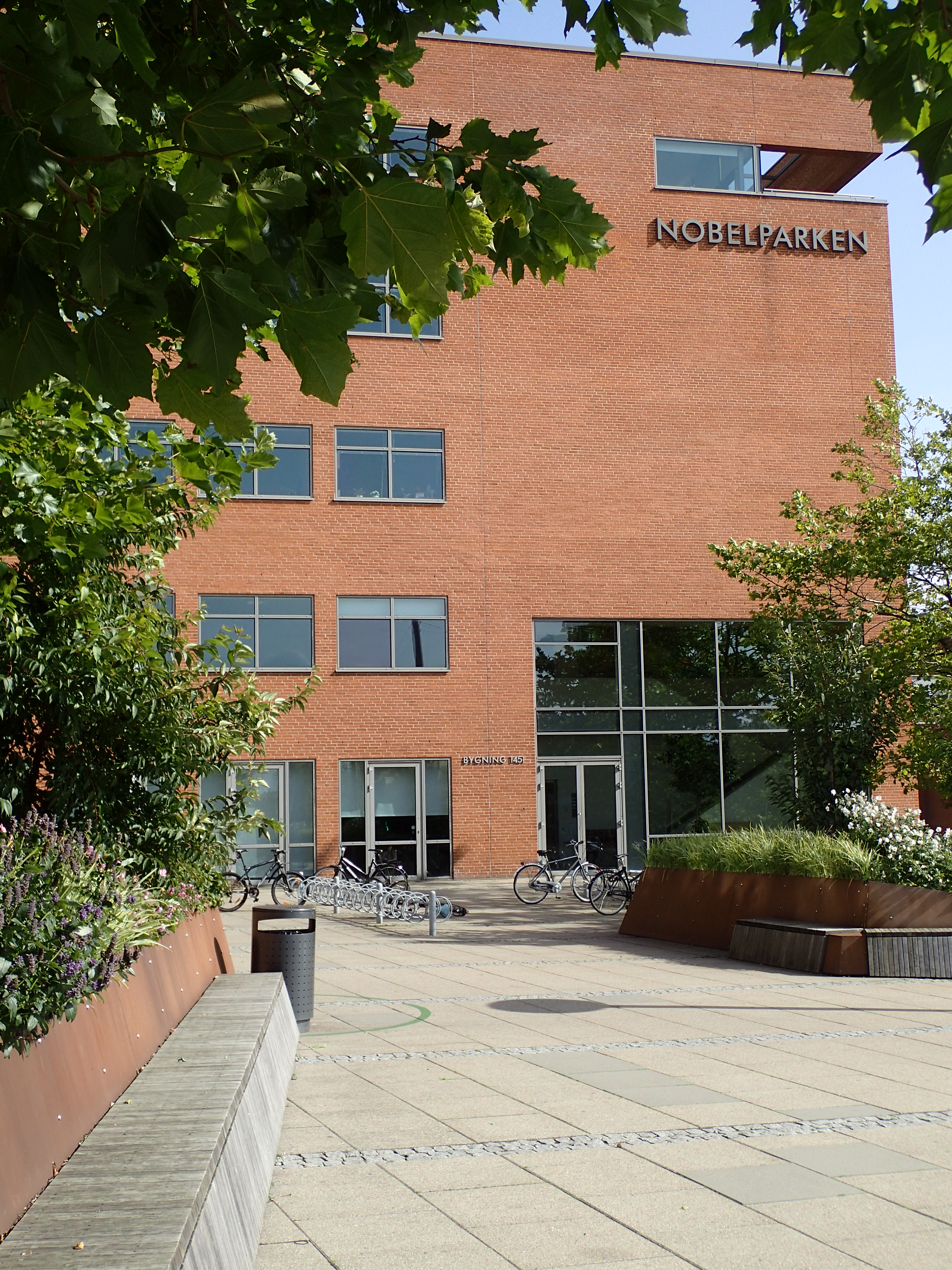
Nobelparken, a relatively new department of Aarhus University from 2004.

=== Lisbjerg ===
Lisbjerg is a former rural village, north of Aarhus by the Randersvej intercity road. It has recently merged with the expanding city, and is now part of the Aarhus N district. The Aarhus Lightrail connects with Lisbjerg, since 2018, and the village is currently expanding with several newly built residential areas, roads, and a public school.

=== Trøjborg ===
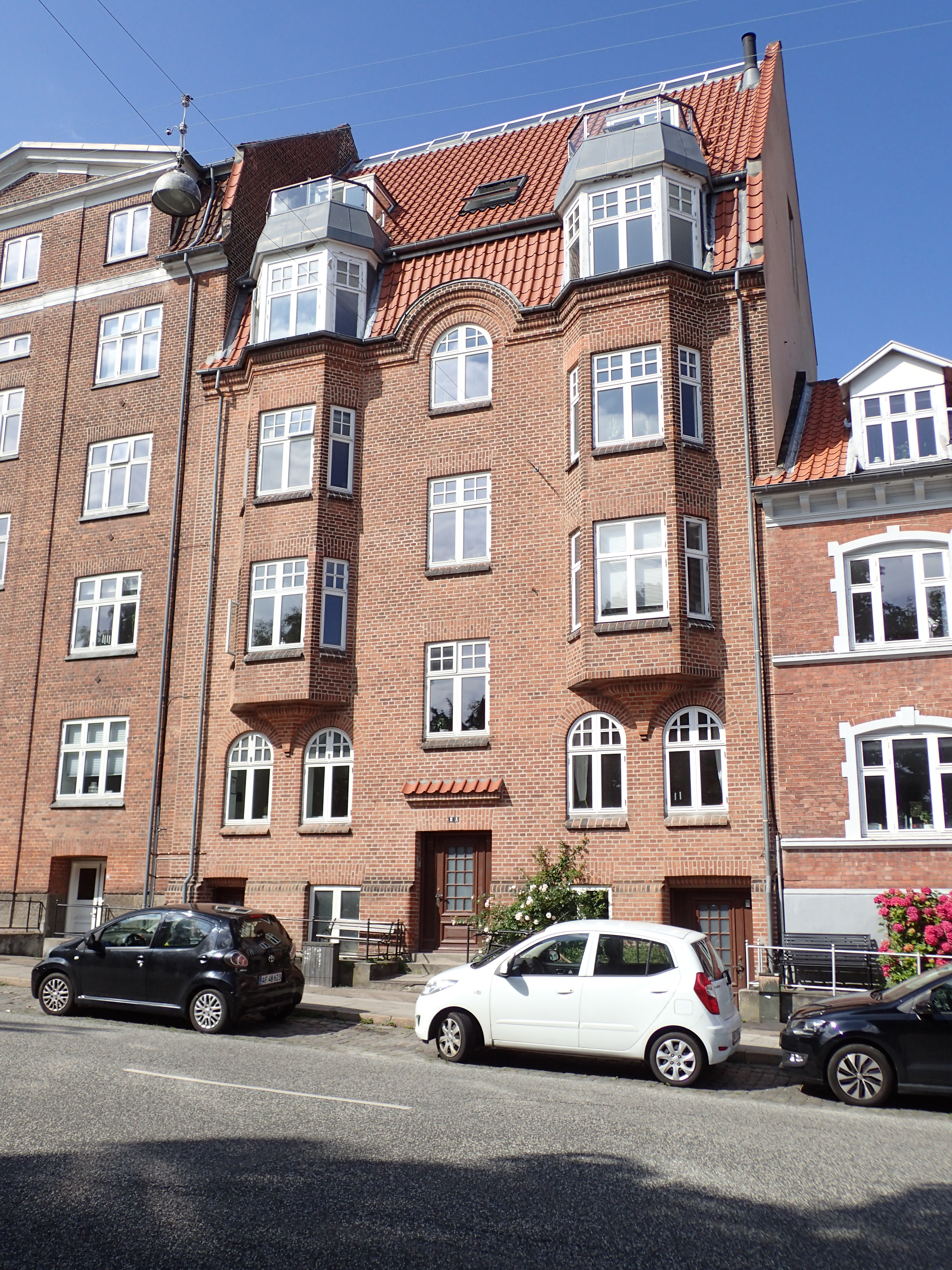
Typical housing block on Trøjborg

Trøjborg is located north of Aarhus C and to the east of Christiansbjerg, along the coast. Around 11,000 people are living here, with many university students. With its short distance to downtown and the nature of Riis Skov and the bay, Trøjborg has also attracted many non-students also. The borough works almost like an independent town-village within the city of Aarhus, having its own distinct architectural charm, shopping district and cultural life. There are about a hundred stores here, a cinema, grocery and fruit markets, plenty cafés, bars and restaurants and the supermarkets Løvbjerg and Rema 1000. The architecture of Trøjborg, presents a typical Danish working-class townscape from the late 1800s to early 1900s. The area underwent a modernisation from 2001 to 2006, with wider sidewalks, reconstructions of the urban space and a few new buildings.

==== Marienlund and Riis Skov ====
Marienlund comprise the northern tip of Trøjborg, near the traffic meeting point of Grenaavej, Nordre Ringgade and Dronning Magrethesvej. It is a residential area of mostly single houses with a distinct architectural design. Marienlund is also the name of a terminus for several bus lines going around and through Aarhus and it is the official gateway to the forest-park of Riis Skov.

Riis Skov stretches along the coast of the bay and is a public forest-park now enclosed by the city. It is one of Aarhus' more significant landmarks and is popular with residents (and tourists) and has been for hundreds of years. Along the coast, there is a small beach and a sea bath, separated from the woods by the regional rail line.

=== Vorrevangen ===
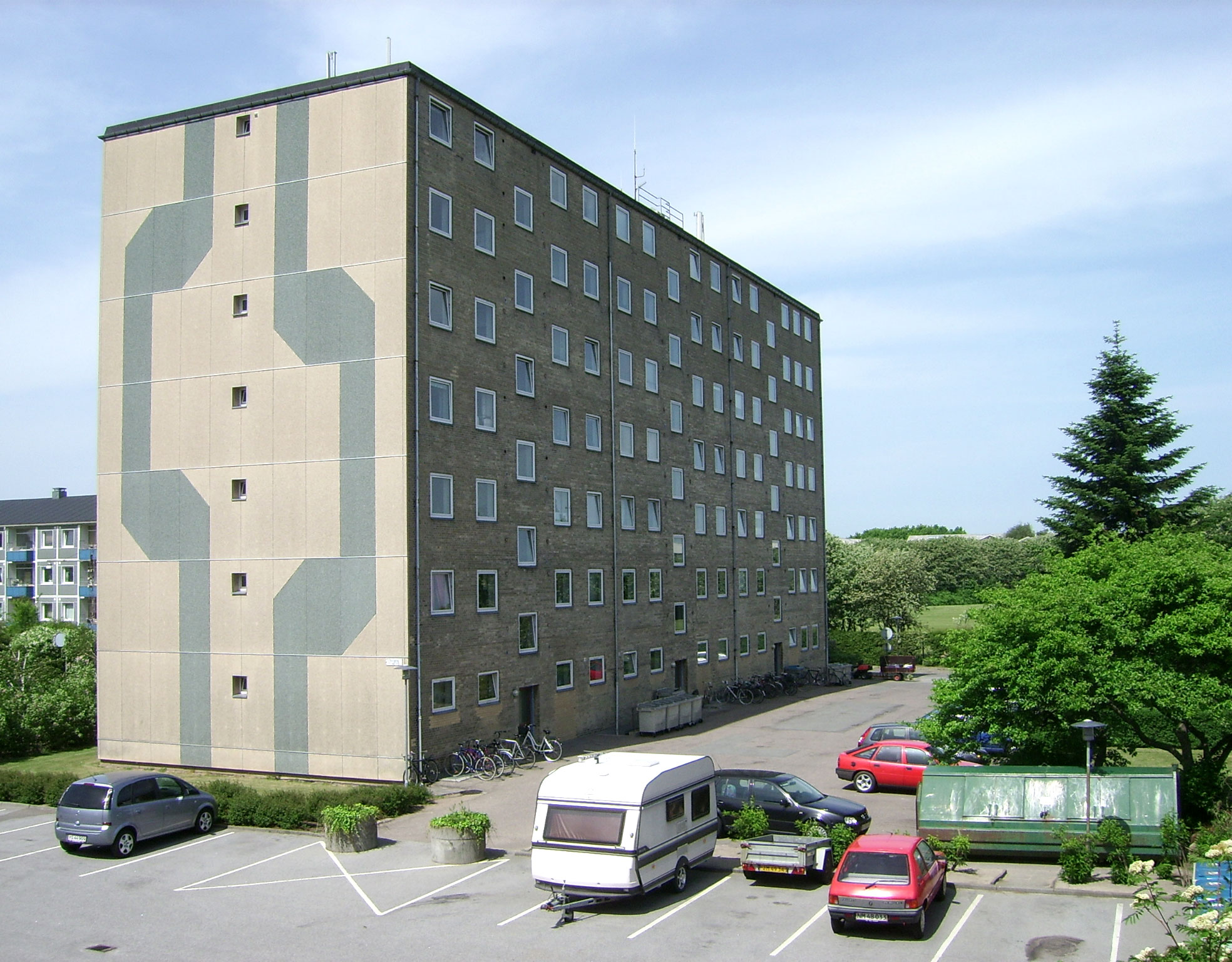
From Vorrevangen. A residential apartment block in yellow brick (1958).

Located just north of Riisvangen, Vorrevangen is also primarily a quiet residential area, but the buildings here are different. They are a mix of apartment buildings and row houses, with a few small detached family houses in between. Vorrevangen is centered on the large school of Vorrevangskolen and there is a small shopping area in the south, at the ring road of Ring 2 close to Riisvangen.

=== Skejby ===
Another former rural village, that has merged with the city of Aarhus. The old village of Skejby, and the typical whitewashed village church, is still present, but the modern Skejby neighborhood extends far beyond this small settlement.

=== Vejlby ===
Vejlby is another former village, that has merged with the expanding city. The whitewashed village church and adjoining grave yard is still present and the surrounding area still has a little bit of the former village charm, even though the local "kro" (Danish inn) closed in the 2000s. In Denmark, village inns traditionally functioned as local centers for larger gatherings and celebrations and an opportunity for visitors and travelers to stay overnight. In the late 20th century the neighbourhood of Vejlby was merged with Risskov, to administratively form the Vejlby-Risskov district, all part of Aarhus N.

=== Risskov ===
A rather large neighborhood on the seaside slopes north of the urban forest of Riis Skov. With a splendid view of the Bay of Aarhus and easy access to the beach, this area comprise many large mansions and detached houses and it has a history as an affluent neighborhood. In the late 20th century, Risskov was administratively merged with Vejlby to form the Vejlby-Risskov district.

== Transportation ==
Both ring roads of Ring 1 and Ring 2 pass through Aarhus N. Two of the city's six intercity motorways - Grenåvej and Randersvej - radiates from the central parts of Aarhus through the district.

=== Bus ===
Aarhus N is served by several bus lines, both intra- and intercity. There are no staffed bus terminals in Aarhus N, but some buses terminate at smaller hubs.

=== Light Rail ===
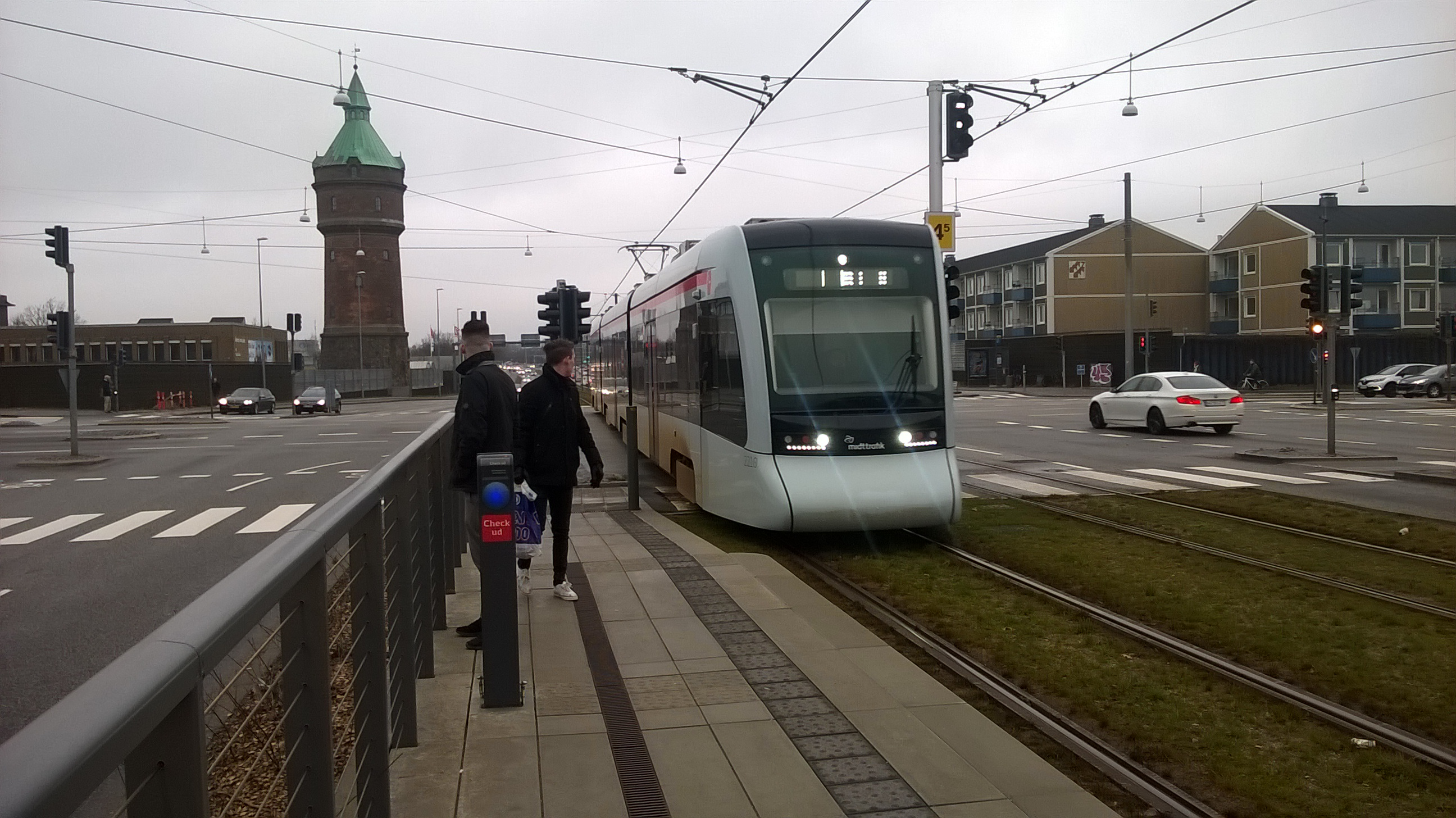
Aarhus light rail at Ring 2 and the Randersvej Water Tower.

In December 2017, the city's first light rail line opened, connecting the Aarhus Central Station with The New University Hospital (DNU) in Skejby. In Aarhus N, most of the line follows the intercity motorway of Randersvej.

== See also ==
Other postal districts in Aarhus includes:

- Aarhus V
- Aarhus C
- Viby J
- Højbjerg
- Brabrand

== Sources ==
- Christiansbjerg: Danish
- Trøjborg: Danish
