= Randersvej Water Tower =

Former water tower on Randersvej in Aarhus, Denmark

- Vandtårnet på Randersvej (Danish)
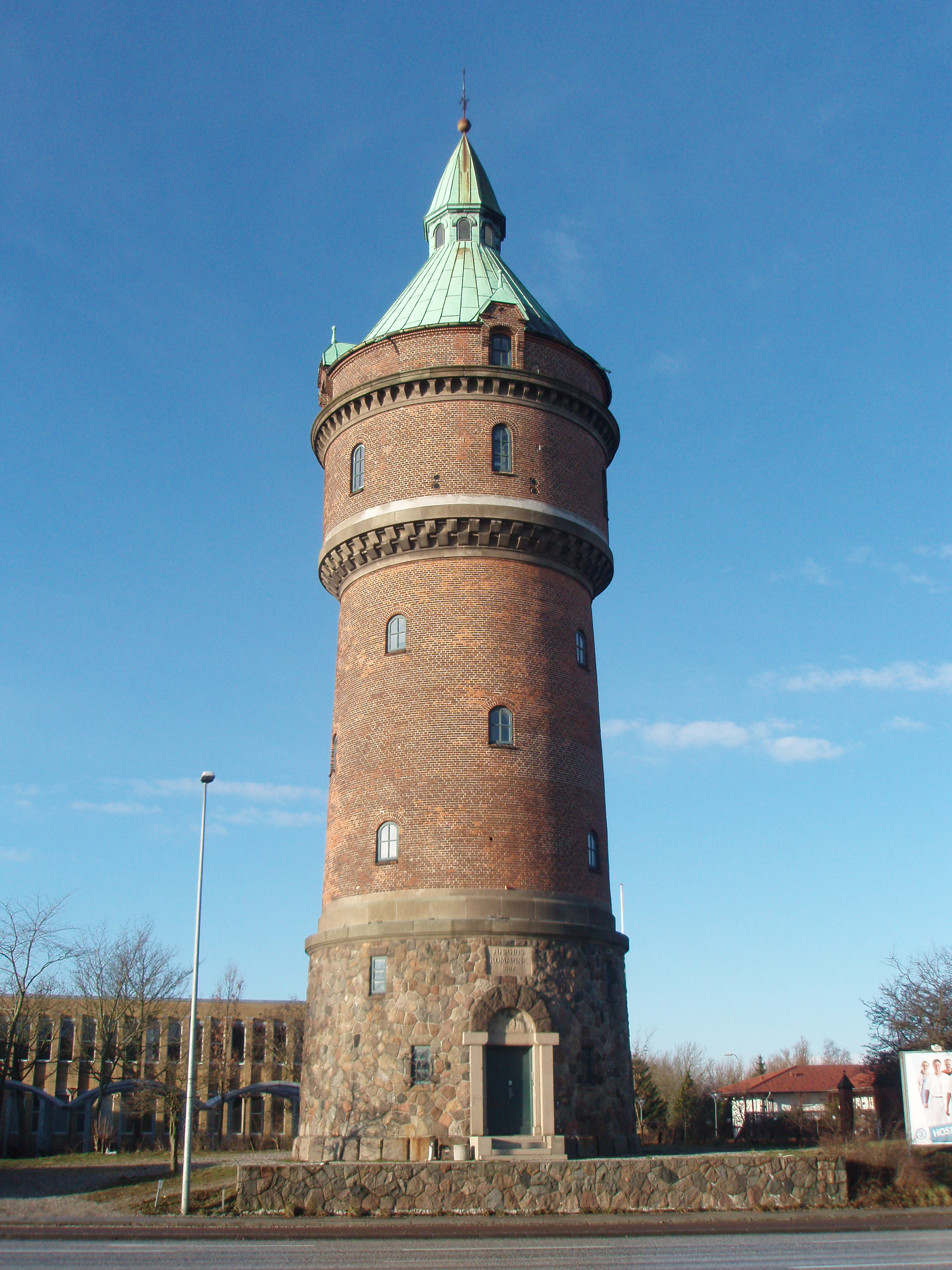
- The tower in January 2009

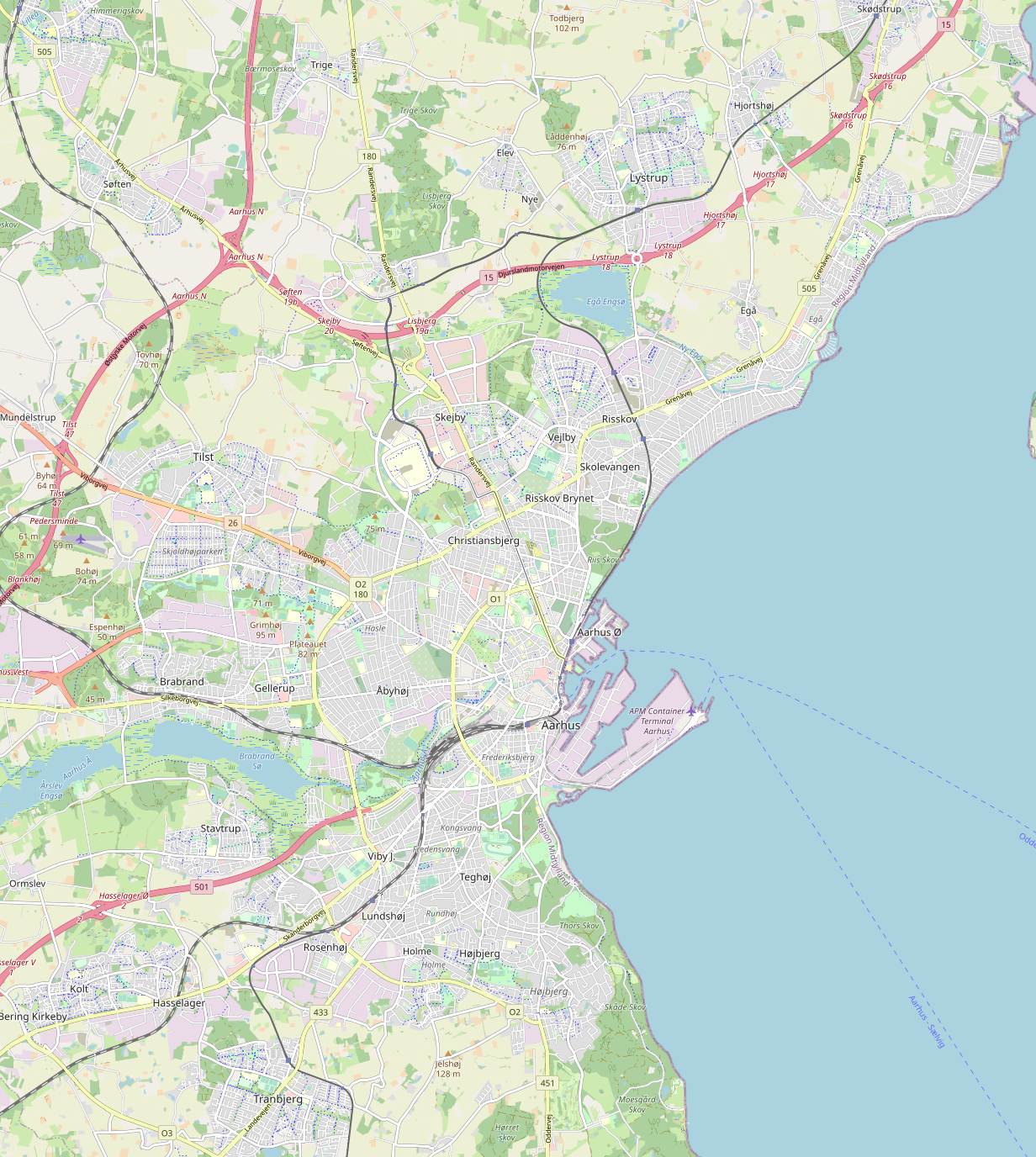
- Location of Randersvej Water Tower within Aarhus, Denmark
- 56°11′0.06″N 10°11′46.75″E
- Location: Aarhus, Denmark

History
- Built: 1907; 119 years ago

Site notes
- Height: 38 metres (125 ft)
- Architect: Charles Wissing

Randersvej Water Tower (Danish: Vandtårnet på Randersvej) is a former water tower on Randersvej in Aarhus, Denmark. The tower is the oldest in the Aarhus area and is listed for preservation.

The water tower was constructed in 1907–1908 and remained on operation until 1980. Today, the tower is owned by Aarhus Municipality and since 2009 has been leased to Aarhus Academy.

== History ==
In the period between 1904 and 1907, the Aarhus area saw rapid population growth and the land of the former Katrinebjerg estate was developed on the city's northern limit. The new development fell within the Christiansbjerg neighborhood of Aarhus, a district with known water supply issues. According to a study from 1901, the well water which residents had access to was hazardous to heath and in such limited supply that people resorted to stealing water from neighboring wells. Several proposals were made at the turn of the 20th century which would alleviate the issue by supplying water from Aarhus Water Works (Aarhus Vandværk). However, these proposals were not given priority, as the neighborhood was primarily inhabited by the lower class, and the city's resources were diverted elsewhere.

The city council eventually agreed that it was their duty to ensure the residents of the Christiansbjerg area were supplied with safe water. As the region's elevation was too high to be supplied with the water pressure at the time, the council agreed in June 1905 to construct a water tower. The tower and its pump house were to be erected on municipal land at Højvang, a site with an elevation of 81.2 meters above sea level. From that elevation, the tower was designed to supply water to "pressure zone III" (Trykzone III), comprising the area of Aarhus which lay north of Ringgaden. Construction began in the spring of 1906 and was completed in 1907. The improvement in hygiene which the tower provided was the catalyst for the transformation of Christiansbjerg into a recognised district in the city which was not reliant on neighboring districts.

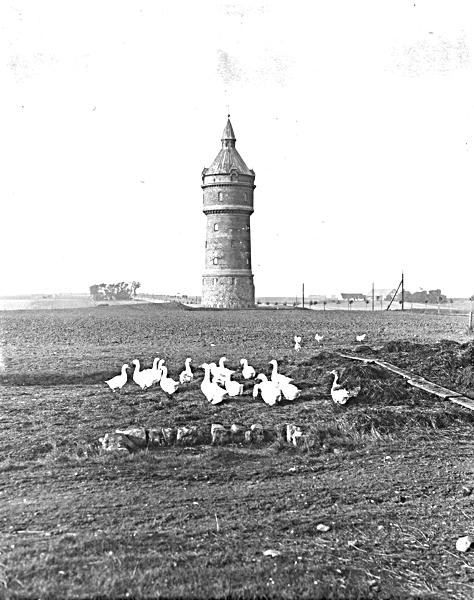
The water tower in 1933, with geese grazing in the foreground.

In the years that immediately followed its construction, the tower stood alone, surrounded by fields. Water was initially pumped to the tower from a station behind Ceres-Bryggeriet (Ceres Brewery). In 1940 a new pumping station at Vestre Ringgade was built. Water was pumped from the new station to the tower beginning on 10 December 1940 via a 10 horsepower diesel-driven pump in the pump house adjacent to the tower. By 1945–1946, the tower required major repairs to its brickwork and the cement covering of the upper ledge, both of which had cracked. At the end of 1947, the tank was also extensively cleaned, repaired, and painted. Following the 1970 Danish Municipal Reform the tower's water supply became redundant and in 1980 its operation was discontinued.

=== Decommissioned use ===
In 1989, Aarhus Municipality leased the tower for free to a private foundation (Fonden Vandtårnet på Randersvej). The lease stipulated that the municipality could demand the tower to be returned to them after 30 years had elapsed. The foundation used the water tower's facilities for its community project Unge i Vandtårnet (English: Youth in the Water Tower) which received financial support from the former Ministry of Integration (Danish: Integrationsministeriet). The project aimed to increase the integration of different ethnic backgrounds in the neighborhood and to activate young people by providing them a common project to work on, namely the repair and maintenance of the water tower.

The most significant work undertaken on the water tower by the foundation was the removal of the water tank from the structure, so that useable floor space could be added. Works began in the early 1990s. Professional craftsmen removed the tank, cast new concrete floors, and added sewage. Work such as installing furnishings, flooring, insulation, and other general renovations were undertaken by the project's youth community under supervision. The major renovation of the tower exceeded the original schedule due to a lack of resources, planning problems, and educational responsibilities of the young people involved. The project was completed by the mid 1990s and consisted of a kitchen, toilets, and a banquet hall.

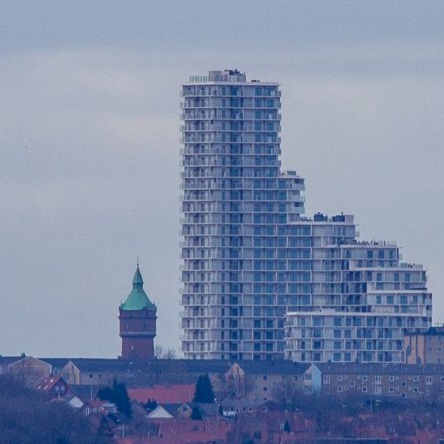
The water tower in its current setting at the Archouse high-rise, 2023.

The foundation was dissolved in the spring of 2005 and the ownership of the tower was returned to the municipality. As the municipality could not find a suitable purpose for the tower, it elected to again lease the structure. In 2009, the tower was leased to Aarhus Academy for 4.8 million DKK.

== Architecture ==
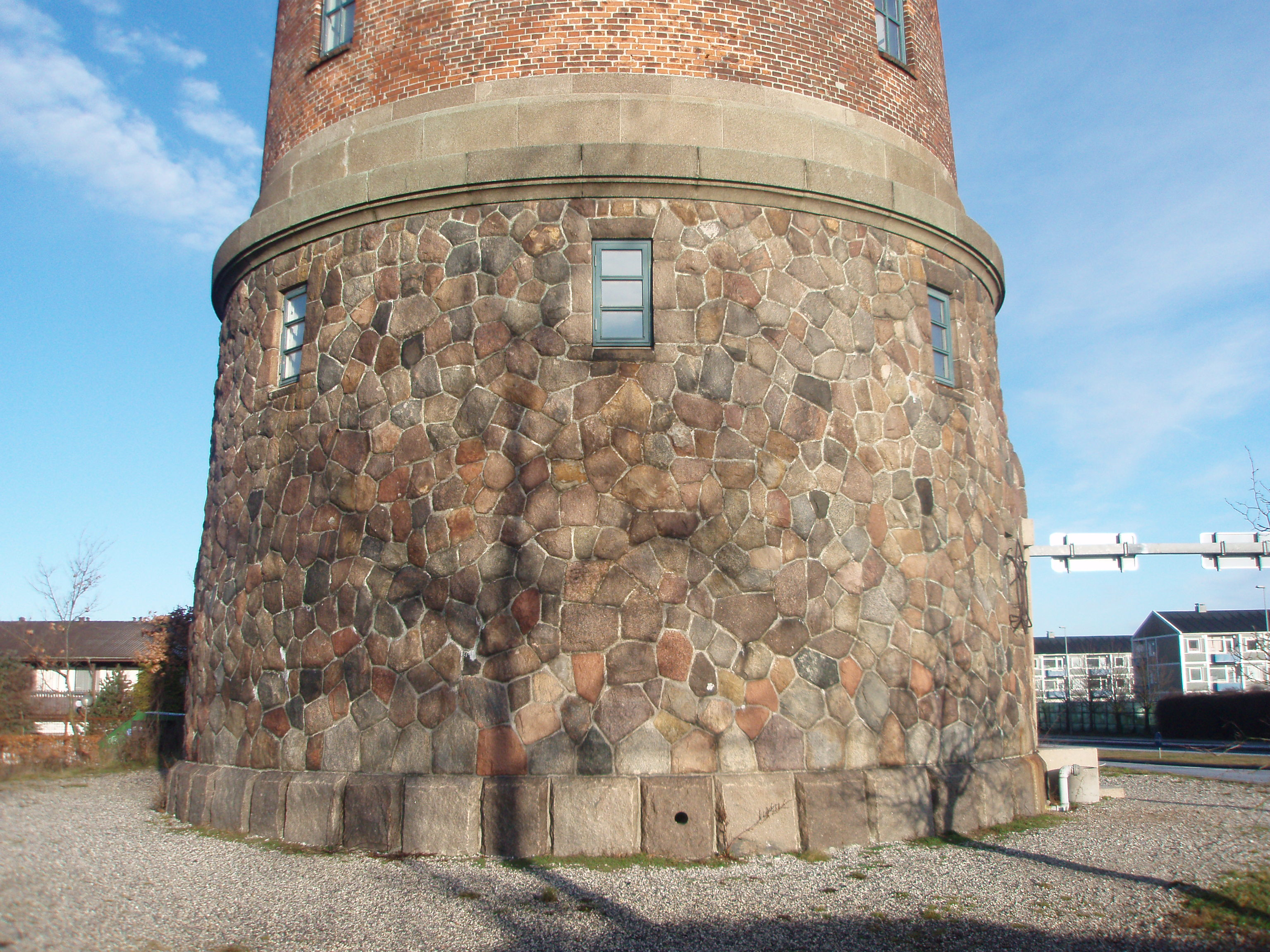
The tower's granite plinth, 2009.

The structure was designed by architect Charles Wissing. Initially, there were discussions about whether to save resources by constructing the tower out of reinforced concrete rather than brick. However, there were no craftsmen in the city who could work with reinforced concrete and there were further fears that the density and durability of the material would not hold up well over time. Ultimately, the tower was built with red bricks supported on a plinth of granite blocks, creating a total height of 38 meters. The roof of the structure is cone-shaped and cladded in copper with a lantern room topped by a weather vane at its peak. Initially, the tower was to be constructed with a cheaper zinc roof, but ultimately copper was chosen for its durability.

The entrance to the structure faces northeast and is accessed via three cement steps. A datestone is embedded above the door along with a carving of the coat of arms of Aarhus. The door is flanked on both sides by barred windows featuring metalwork that resembles the tower. The base of the structure has 6 other rectangular windows without bars. The windows in the brick shaft of the tower have rectangular bases and rounded tops.

The water tank was constructed in iron and was designed to hold 200 cubic meters of water. A control panel was also installed so that the water level could be read. The top floor of the tower included a gallery which surround the cistern. It offered a view of the surrounding city and access so that repairs could be made to the water tank. The cistern was removed in the renovations of the 1990s, and the timber flooring which previously offered access to the gallery have been replaced by concrete floors which span the entire width of the interior. The internal staircase, too was originally constructed in wood, but has since been bricked.

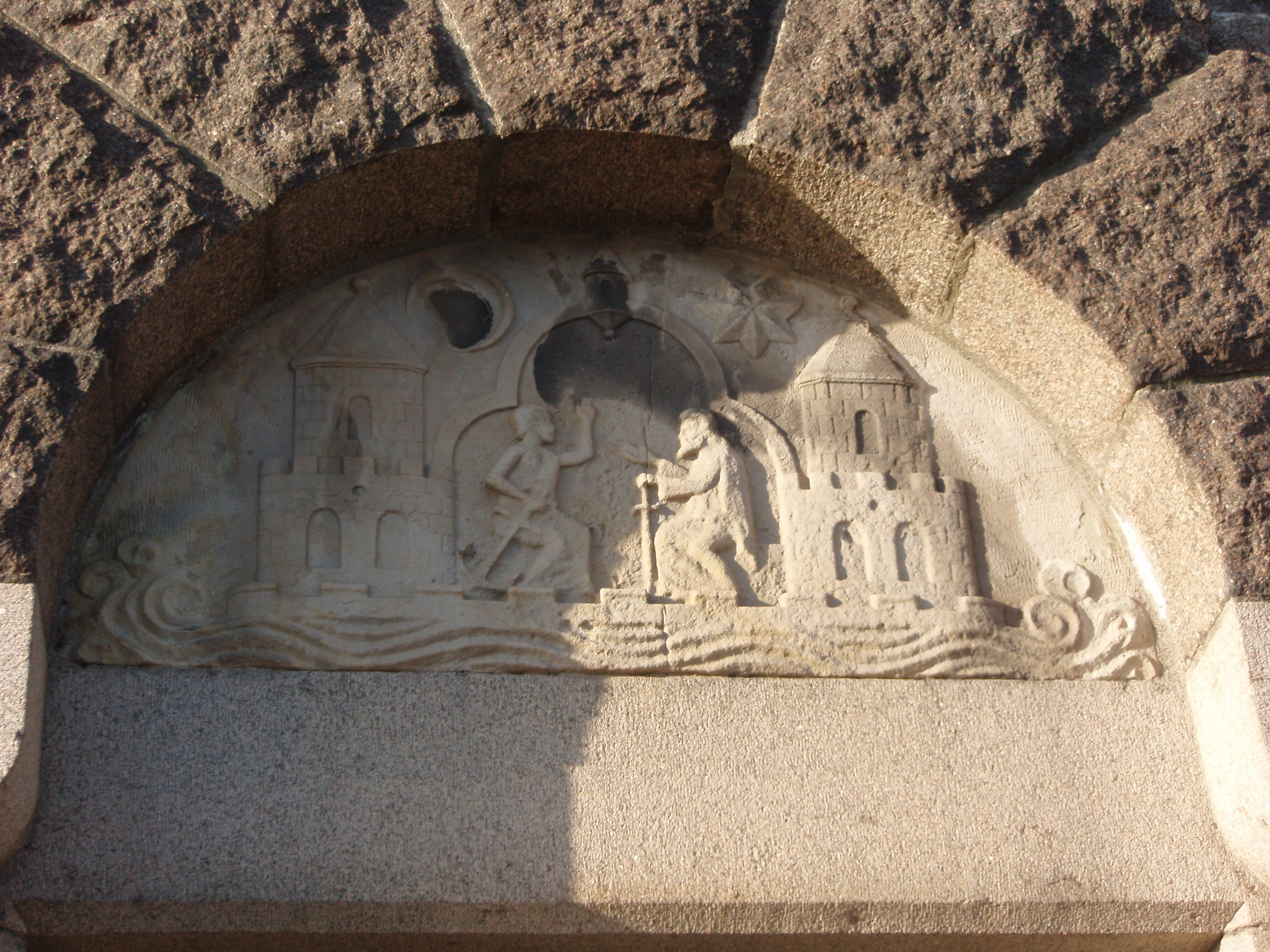
Relief above the entrance door to the tower depicting the Coat of arms of Aarhus.

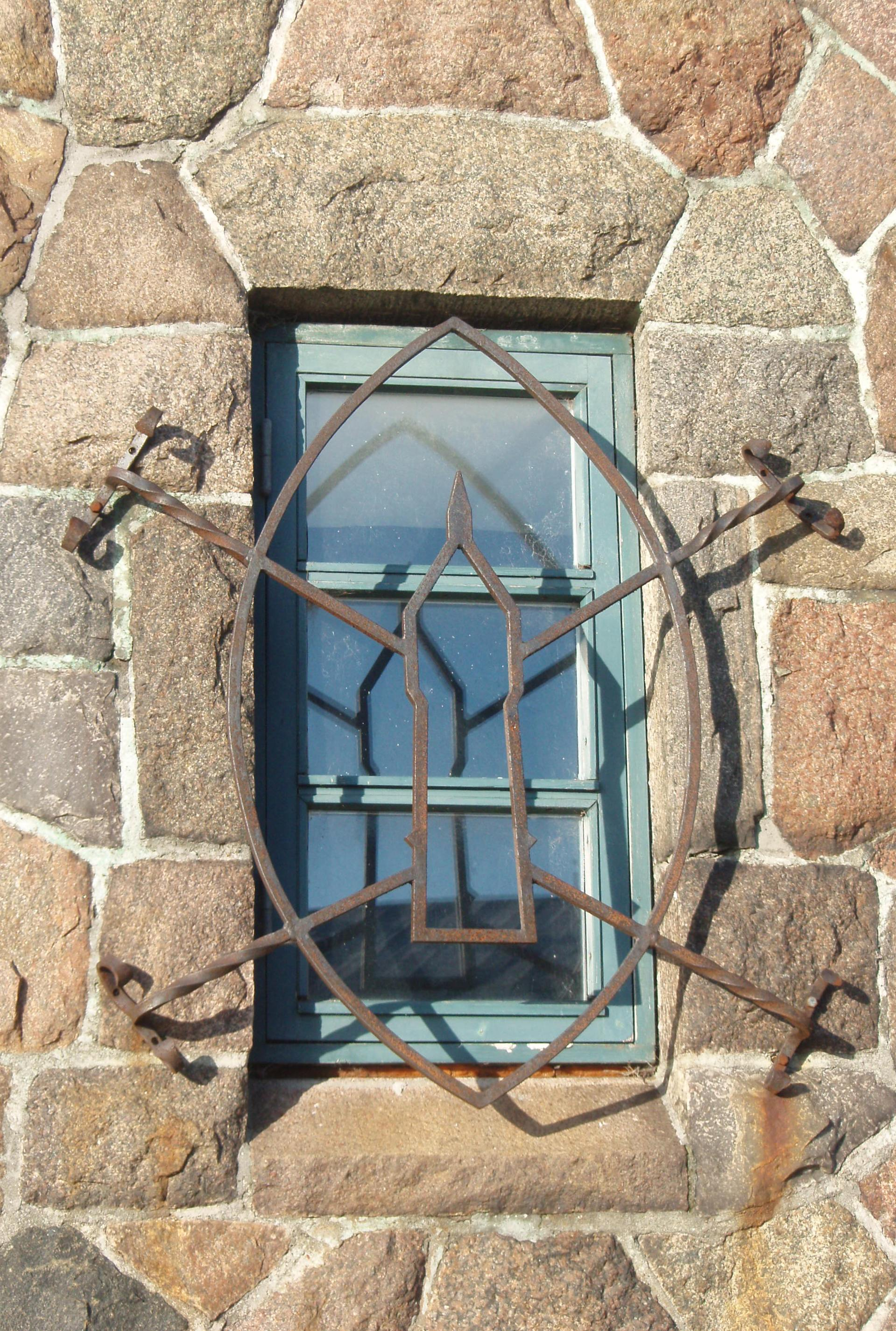
Iron detail on one of the windows adjacent to the entrance door depicting the tower itself.

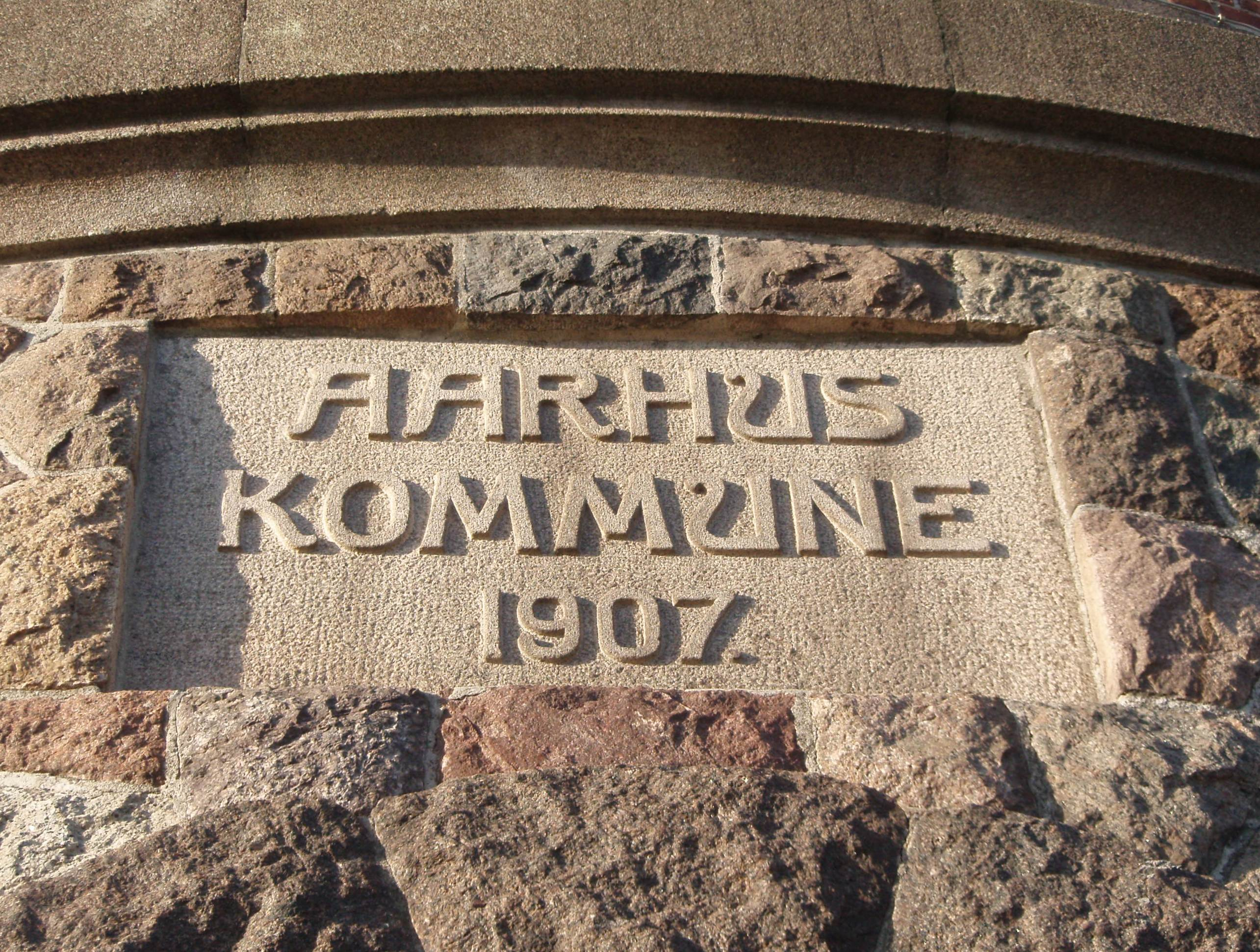
Datestone above the entrance to the tower, 2009.
