= Aarhus Academy =

Secondary school in Aarhus, Denmark

Coordinates: 56.105858°N 10.114617°E

- Århus Akademi
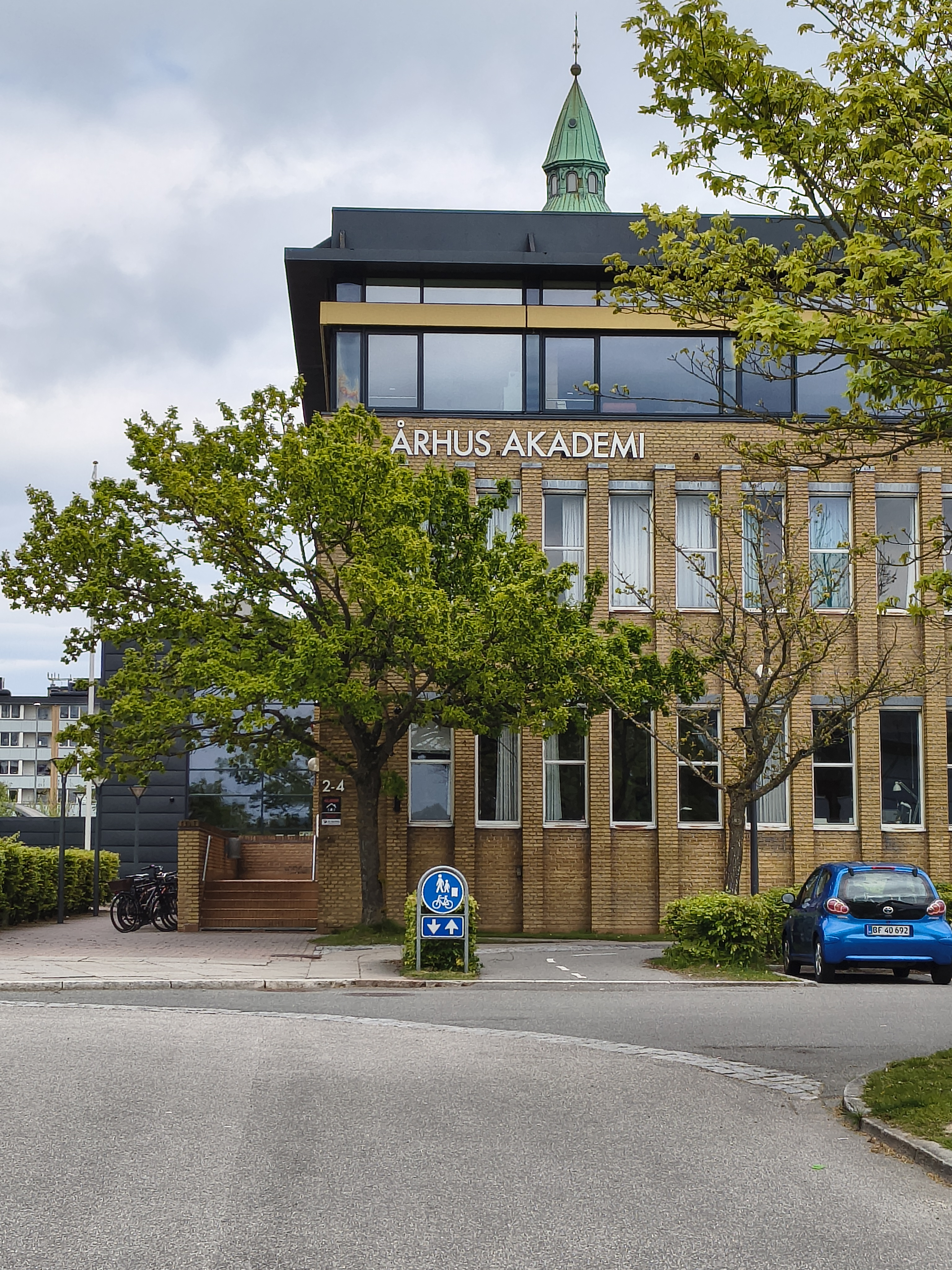
- Aarhus Akademi with Randersvej Water Tower in the background
- Type: Secondary education
- Established: 1933
- Rector: Hans Chr. Risgaard (2015)
- Students: 850 (2012)
- Location: Aarhus, Denmark
- Website: http://www.aarhusakademi.dk/

The Aarhus Academy (Danish: Århus Akademi) is a school of secondary education in Aarhus, Denmark. The school offers the 2 year Higher Preparatory Examination (HF) programme, the 2 year Matriculation examination (STX) programme and supplementary courses in specific disciplines. Aarhus Academy is located in the neighborhood of Christiansbjerg in the city district of Aarhus N.

The academy was founded in 1933 by Svend Orhammer Andersen as a public elementary school which also offered a 2-year Matriculation examination programme for older students. Svend Andersen transferred oversigt of the academy to the Danish state in 1965 and 5 years later, in 1970, the Academy started a 2-year HF programme. The most popular programme through the 1970s was the 2-year STX programme which expanded greatly but in the late 1970s it gradually reversed. The three HF programmes from Risskov Gymnasium was transferred to the academy in August 1980 and the HF programme became dominant. The academy is today the largest institution of secondary education offering the 2-year HF programme and the only 2-year STX school in the area. The academy had 800 to 900 students between 2005 and 2015, divided across about twentyfive HF classes and four STX classes.
