= Riisvangen Stadium =

Football stadium in Denmark

Coordinates: 56.1788°N 10.2110°E

Riisvangen
- "Vangen"
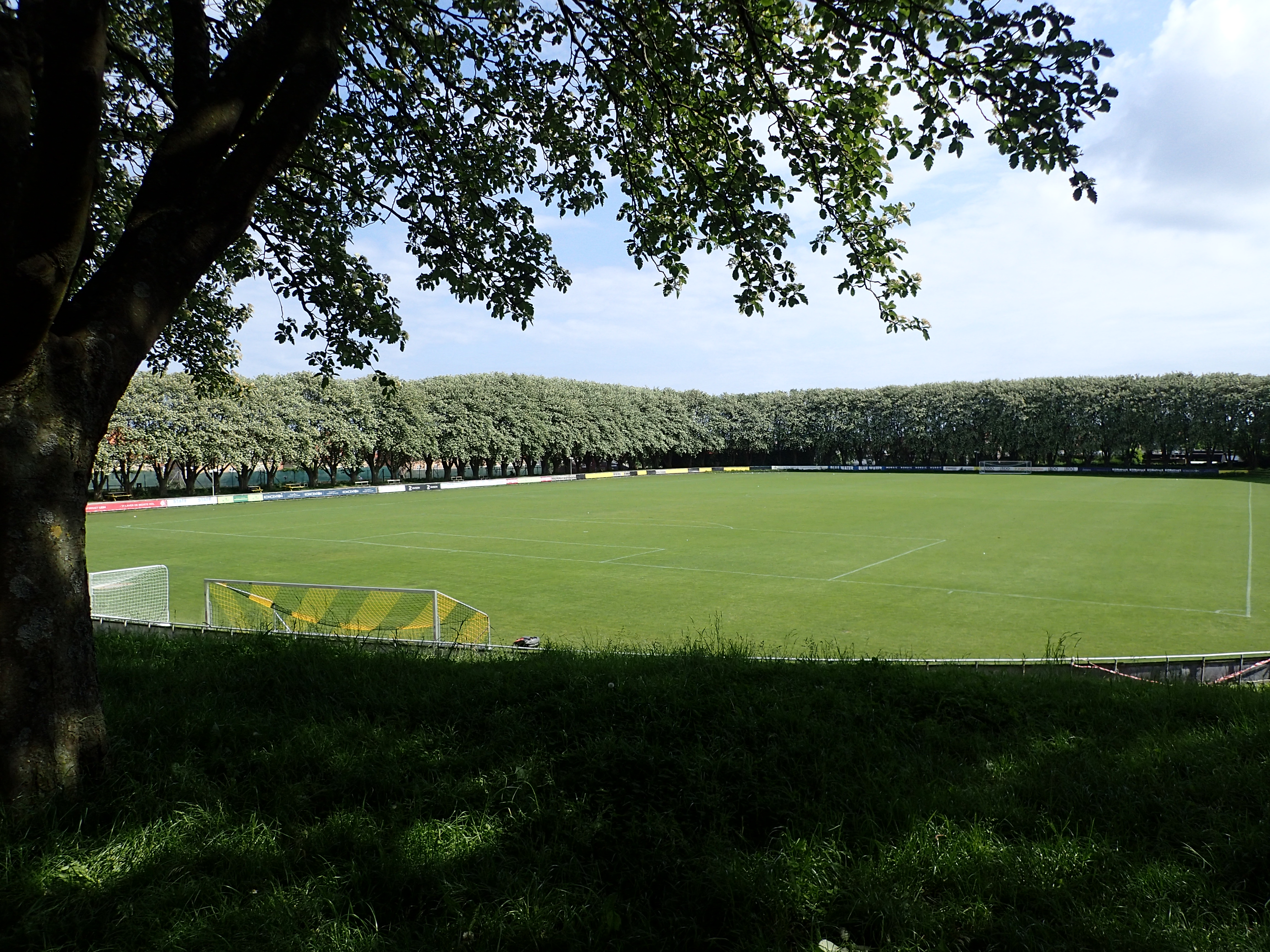
- Riisvangen Stadium, football club Aarhus Fremad's hometurf.
- Interactive map of Riisvangen
- Full name: Riisvangen Stadion
- Location: 8200 Aarhus N, Aarhus Municipality, Denmark
- Capacity: 5,000
- Surface: Grass
- Record attendance: 3,200 (Aarhus Fremad vs Ikast fS, 2 November 1996)
- Field size: 105 by 68 metres (114.8 yd × 74.4 yd)

Construction
- Built: 1936
- Opened: 1939
- Expanded: 2018

Tenants
- Aarhus Fremad (1969–); IK Skovbakken (1939–1969)

Riisvangen Stadion (Danish: [ˈʁisˌvɑŋˀn̩], "Riis Meadow") is an association football stadium in Aarhus N. It is the home stadium of Danish 2nd Division club Aarhus Fremad. Stadium capacity is 5,000, but the attendance record is 3,200 which occurred when the club competed in the Danish Superliga, in a matchup against Ikast fS on 2 November 1997.

Riisvangen Stadion was constructed in the 1936 on the initiative of Aarhus Municipality. During this period, the population of Aarhus had experienced a large population growth concentrated around northern Aarhus, known as Aarhus N, and the construction of a sports facility would facilitate needs to nurture sports in the area. The stadium was built in an area which, at that time, was devoid of buildings.

Initially, IK Skovbakken used the stadium as their home ground before the club moved to the later established sports complex Vejlby-Risskov Idrætscenter.

In April 2018, a new wooden stand was initiated against Brønshøj Boldklub. On 4 October 2019, Fremad announced a sponsorship deal with Royal Unibrew, which meant that the stand was named "Faxe Kondi Tribunen", after the soft drink produced by the company.
