= Ring 2 (Aarhus) =

Ring road around Aarhus, Denmark

Coordinates: 56°6′9″N 10°12′23″E

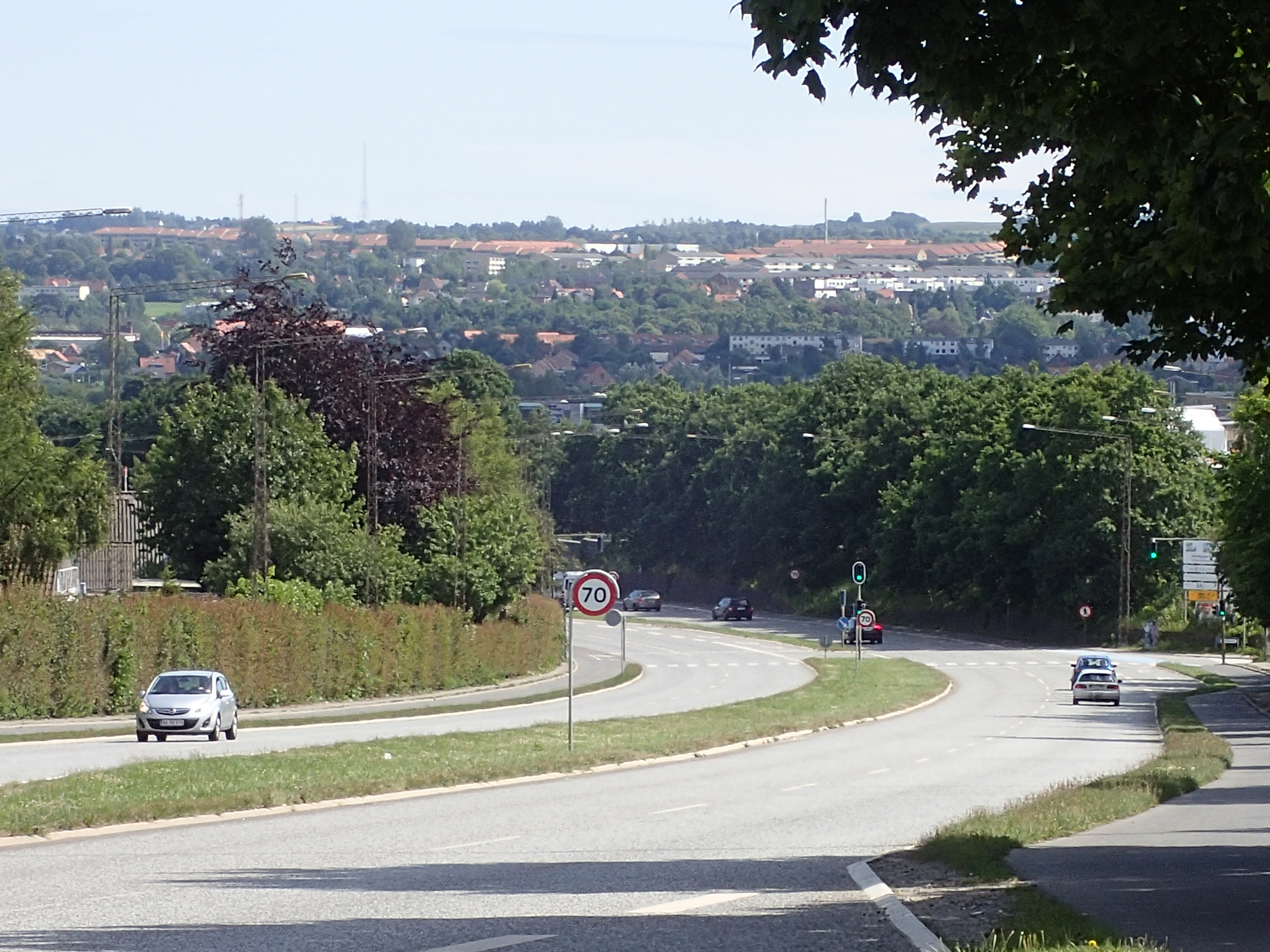
Ring 2 (Ringvejen). This particular stretch is from Viby Ringvej in Åbyhøj

Ring 2, or Ringvejen, is the outermost ring road surrounding the city of Aarhus in Denmark.

== Geography ==
Ring 2 bounds the outer neighborhoods of the central urban area. It is part of the Danish national road network and is numbered O2, the letter 'O' denoting it is a ring road. The total length of the road is about 14.5 km.

Ring 2 is composed of 6 stretches of road, from Ringvej Syd in the South in Viby to Vejlby Ringvej in the North in Vejlby and Risskov. Ringvej Syd, the southernmost section of the ring road, is connected to the rest of Ring 2 via a small 1.4 km stretch of Skanderborgvej. Other than the small connecting stretch, the long intercity motorway of Skanderborgvej is not a part of Ring 2.

Road name
Ringvej Syd
Skanderborgvej (small connecting stretch)
Viby Ringvej
Åby Ringvej
Hasle Ringvej
Vejlby Ringvej

== History ==
Ideas and plans for construction of another ring road around Aarhus began in the 1930s, before the first ring road of Ring 1 was even finished. Construction of Ring 2 commenced in the 1950s but was then put on hold for decades, due to uncertainty of other nearby traffic projects, until it was finally finished in 1987.

As in many other cities of Denmark, the residential areas around Ring 2 in Aarhus, has been under urban renewal since the beginning of the new millennium.

== See also ==
- Ring 1 (Aarhus)
