= Ring 1 (Aarhus) =

Ring road in Aarhus, Denmark

Coordinates: 56°10′38″N 10°13′4″E

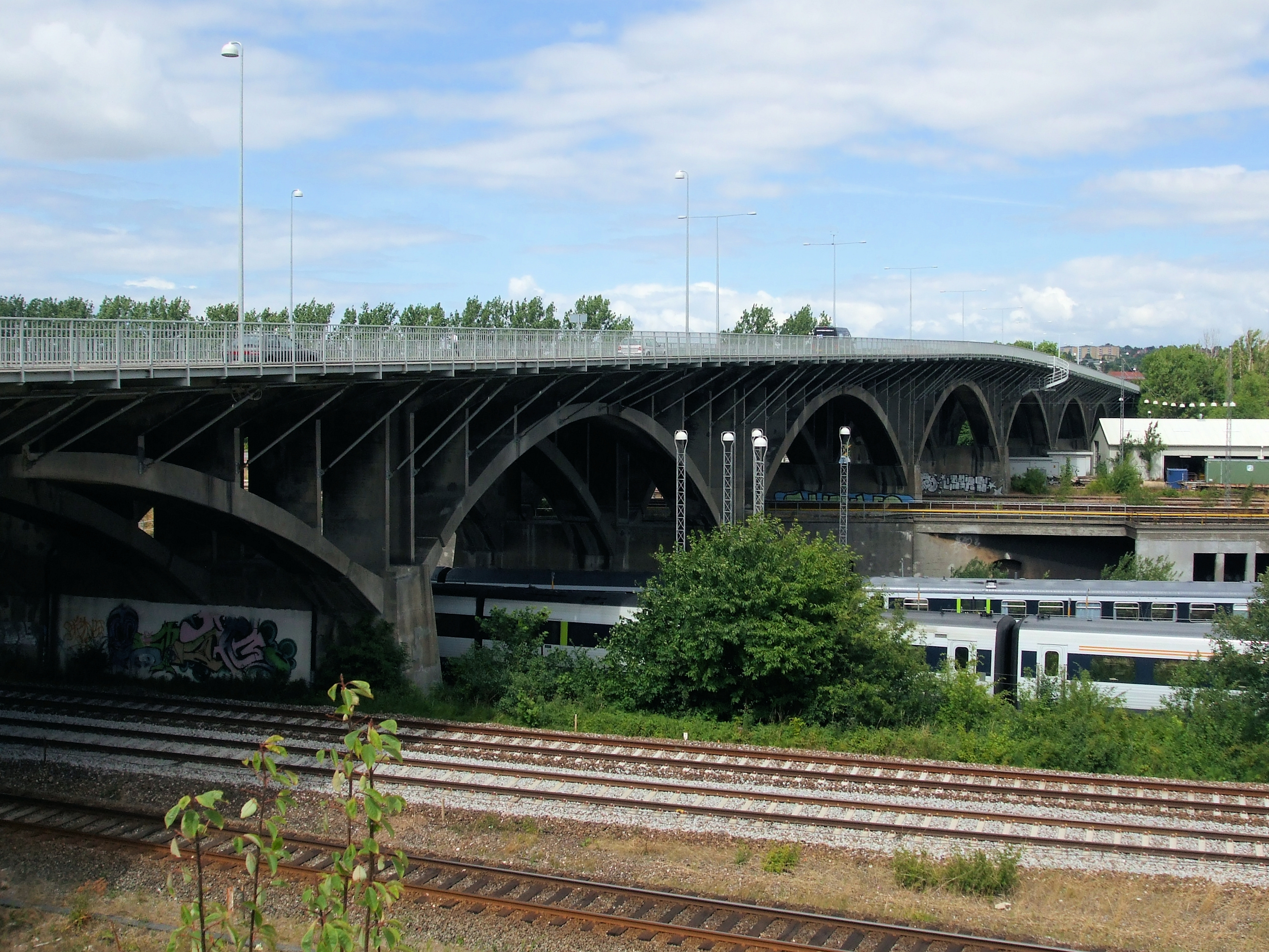
Ring 1 (Ringgaden). The bridge of Ringgadebroen, crossing the railway yard.

Ring 1, or Ringgaden, is a ring road that surrounds the most central part of Aarhus, Denmark, roughly bounding the neighborhood of Midtbyen. It is part of the Danish national road network and is numbered O1, denoting a ring road. The total length of the road is about 8.8 km.

== Geography ==
Ring 1 connects the major road Marselis Boulevard in the south with Grenåvej in the north at Marienlund. Ringgaden is subdivided according to the geographical location and is named like this (south to north):

Road name
Sønder Ringgade
Ringgadebroen
Vestre Ringgade
Nordre Ringgade

== History ==
Ideas for a ring road around Aarhus materialised politically in 1919, and it was subsequently constructed in several stages, beginning in 1923 and finishing in 1938.

== See also ==
- Ring 2 (Aarhus)

== Sources ==
- Aarhus Municipality: Nordre Ringgade, Kommuneatlas (in Danish)
