= Coat of arms of Aarhus =

- Blue shield two sitting men wearing blue robes, flanked by two red towers above a fort and the sea.
- Armiger: Aarhus
- Adopted: 1938 (Originally c. 1250)
- Shield: Azure

The coat of arms of Aarhus is an official symbol of Aarhus based on one of the oldest surviving seals of the medieval Danish market towns. The coat of arms can be traced back to a seal used in Aarhus around 1250. The oldest known preserved seal was in a document from 24 June 1356 which was lost in destruction during the Second World War. The seal has had a number of different forms during its 750 year long existence.

== Overview ==
The original seal depicts two figures in robes, holding an anchor and a sword respectively, in a portal flanked by two towers. The towers are thought to symbolize the original Romanesque Aarhus Cathedral which had two prominent west towers. The two figures are not known but the one holding the anchor is thought to be St. Clement, the patron saint of sailors and whom the cathedral is named for. The figure holding the sword is thought to be the Apostle Paul. The oldest seals feature the name of the city written as "Arusiensis", adjective of Arusia, originally interpreted as "Åre hus" or "city by the mouth of the river". Later seals looked very different. In 1581 it was three oars and in 1672 it was three oars inside a building above waves and two fish.

In 1938 Aarhus Municipality had the present coat of arms designed by the artist and engraver Fr. Fritze. The new coat of arms is based on the original seal from the 1250s. The concept of city seal was at the same retired. The official announcement in Statstidende on 23 June 1938 described the new coat of arms as: "A blue shield, with a red portal, flanked by two red tower and a spire, with depiction of St. Clement and St. Paul, dressed in blue robes. Above the portal is a golden moon and a seven-spiked golden star and underneath it and above 4 silver waves a red painted wall."

In 2004 Aarhus Municipality had a new stylized logo designed based on the 1250 seal.

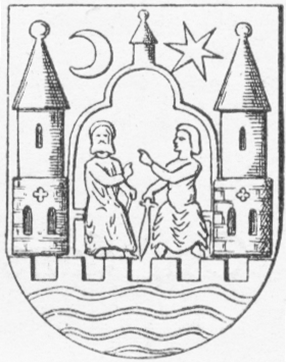
Seal from 1423

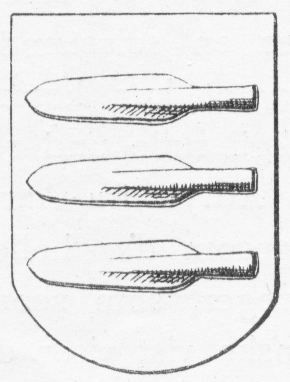
Seal from 1581

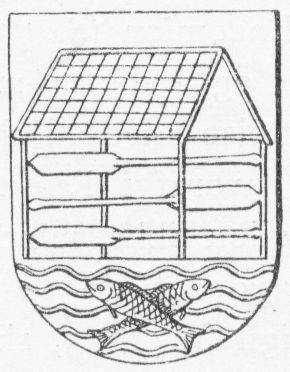
Seal from 1672

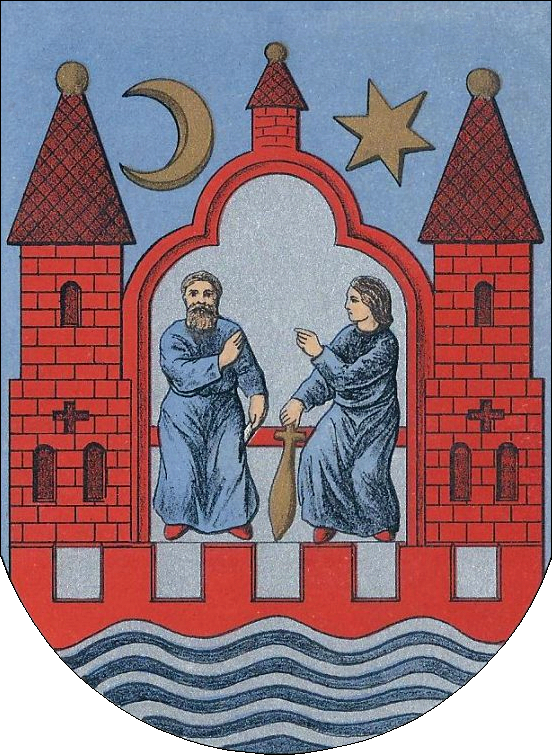
Interpretation of Aarhus coat of arms by Fritz Benzen c. 1945

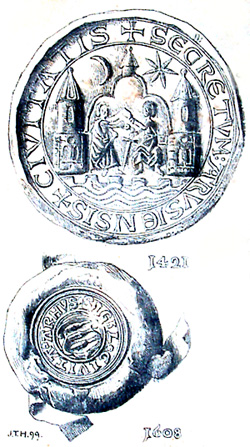
Seals from 1421 (top) and from 1608 (bottom)

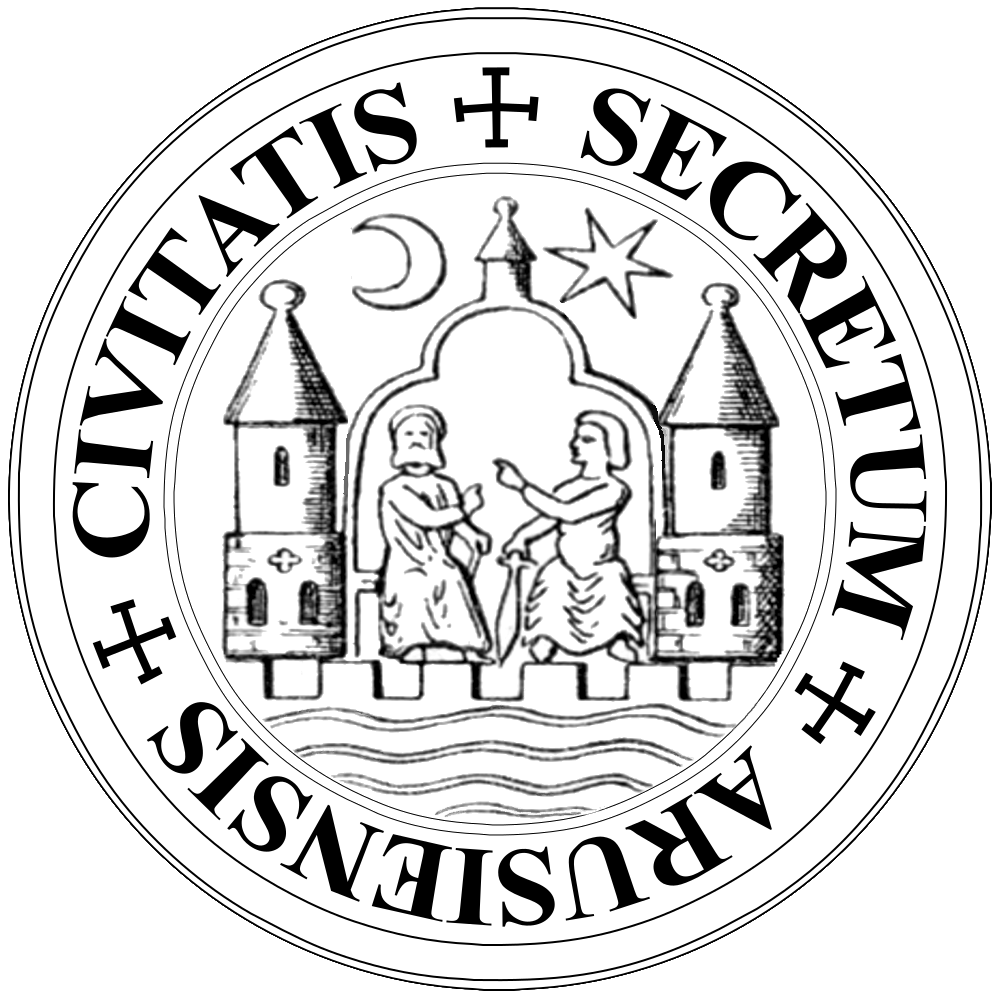
Stylized version of the seal from 1421

== See also ==
- Coat of arms of Denmark
